= Susan Hudson =

Susan Hudson may refer to:

- Susan Hudson (artist) (born 1941), Canadian visual artist
- Susan Hudson (quilter) (born 1957 or 1958), American and Navajo Nation quilter
