= Center for Traditional Music and Dance =

Folk and traditional arts organization in New York City

The Center for Traditional Music and Dance (CTMD) is a leading folk/traditional arts organization based in New York City. Originally established as the Balkan Arts Center in 1968, CTMD assists the city's ethnic and immigrant communities in maintaining their traditions and cultural heritage. CTMD has developed a range of programs that emphasize research, documentation, collaboration, presentation, and education to help advance its mission of cultural equity. Over the past five decades, CTMD's programs have led to the creation of nationally renowned ensembles, folk arts festivals, and community-based cultural organizations. CTMD provides the public with a full calendar of events designed to showcase and promote the diversity of New York City's performing arts traditions.

== History ==
In 1968, towards the end of the North American Folk Music Revival and shortly after the Immigration and Nationality Act of 1965 was passed to replace the U.S. immigration quota system, Martin Koenig established the Balkan Arts Center in New York City to promote and foster an appreciation of Balkan dance traditions. Over the next few years Koenig, along with fellow New Yorker and folk music enthusiast Ethel Raim, also conducted fieldwork for Ralph Rinzler in an effort to scout artists and performers for the annual Smithsonian Festival of American Folklife (now known as the Smithsonian Folklife Festival). Raim eventually joined Koenig as co-director of the Balkan Arts Center in the mid-Seventies, around the same time as the establishment of the Folk Arts Program within the National Endowment for the Arts and the enactment of the American Folklife Preservation Act. With the financial support of the NEA, Koenig and Raim proceeded to build an organization that would focus exclusively on the music and dance traditions of New York City's immigrant and ethnic populations.

Originally promoting the arts of Albanian, Macedonian, and Greek cultures, the Balkan Arts Center expanded its operations into other communities as New York's demographic makeup shifted with each new influx of immigrants. Over the course of five decades and two name changes (the Ethnic Arts Center in 1981 and the Center for Traditional Music and Dance in 1997), CTMD has worked with dozens of ethnic and immigrant communities throughout the five boroughs.

According to its current mission statement CTMD is a nonprofit organization "dedicated to preserving and presenting the performing arts traditions of New York’s immigrant and ethnic communities through research-based educational programming, public performance, and community partnerships." Towards this end, CTMD has established and collaborated on a number of projects, including Community Cultural Initiatives (CCI), Sharing Traditions youth education programs, Touring Artist series, an extensive archive of audio and visual documents from over forty years of performances and events, the production of major festivals, the publication of printed materials, and the release of audio and visual recordings. These programs and projects are designed to advance the mission of cultural equity, a concept advanced by Alan Lomax in his appeal for the recognition of the right of every culture to promote and preserve its unique heritage and traditions.

== Programs ==
Community Cultural Initiatives

According to the CTMD website, the Community Cultural Initiative (CCI) program is "the Center’s most effective tool for advancing its mission of cultural equity – the right of every cultural group to express and sustain its distinctive cultural heritage." The multi-year CCI model places a strong emphasis on ethnographic fieldwork in New York City's ethnic and immigrant communities, collaboration with community members, documentation of events and artists, presentation of performing arts traditions to the wider public, and education in traditional music and dance for the youth. CCI programs are also designed to promote sustained interest in and financial support for the performing arts traditions of New York's diverse communities.

CCI programs are generally structured in three phases occurring over the course of five years. The first phase, lasting approximately one year, consists of initial contacts with musicians and teachers, investigation and documentation of local performing arts traditions, the establishment of working relationships between CTMD and community members, and an assessment of available resources and pressing needs in the community. The middle phase of the CCI model, generally lasting three years, involves program development through ongoing collaboration between CTMD and local artists, teachers, and organizations. CCI programs conclude with a transition to ongoing and self-sustaining cultural activities within immigrant and ethnic communities, sometimes with the development of new or strengthened autonomous cultural organizations.

Current CCI programs include work in the Chinese, Ukrainian, and Colombian communities, as well as the An-Sky Institute for Jewish Culture. Previous CCI programs have taken place in the Greek, Jewish, Italian, Irish, Puerto Rican, Albanian, Arab, Dominican, Asian-Indian, Indo-Caribbean, West African, Soviet Jewish, Filipino, Mexican, and Peruvian communities.

Sharing Traditions

The Sharing Traditions program began in the late 1990s as part of an effort to help foster awareness and appreciation among the youth of New York City's immigrant and ethnic communities for the traditional performing arts of their respective cultures. This program provides support for education in traditional music and dance, and has incorporated intensive classes and workshops for children in the Mountain Jewish, Bukharan Jewish, Indo-Caribbean, Mexican, Peruvian, Chinese, and Ukrainian communities. The Mariachi Academy of New York and Pachamama Peruvian Arts are two recent examples of successful organizations that evolved from Sharing Traditions programs.

Touring Artists

CTMD Touring Artists Program showcases performing arts ensembles from a variety of cultural traditions. Touring Artists works to bring these performers to stages across the United States in an effort to celebrate and cultivate awareness for the traditional performing arts.

Masters on Stage: Major Concerts and Festivals

CTMD presents both local and international artists each year through a variety of concerts, festivals, and workshops in New York City. These events include the Heritage Sunday Festival, produced in partnership with Lincoln Center Out of Doors, and the New York World Festival, produced in partnership with Central Park SummerStage, World Music Institute, and Lotus Music and Dance. The fourth New York World Festival planned for Fall of 2010 will feature musical performers from countries surrounding the Black Sea.

Past events include:
Queens Ethnic Music and Dance Festival (various communities, 1976–1991)
Greek Festival (1976, 1982)
Dave Tarras Concert Series (Ashkenazic Jewish, 1978–1979)
Greek Music Tour (1982–1983)
Music Around the Mediterranean Concert Series (1982)
Musica Popolare Tour (Italian, 1983–1985)
Cherish the Ladies Concerts (1985) and Tour (1987–1989)
Jewish Music Tour (1980–1981)
Statue of Liberty Centennial Salute to Immigrant Cultures (various, 1986)
Fiesta Navideña (Puerto Rican, 1987)
Festival Shqiptar (Albanian, 1990-ongoing)
Rhythms of New York Festival (various, 1990–1993)
Folk Parks (various communities, 1993–2000)
Shashmaqam Tour (Central Asian Jewish, 1993–1994)
Maharajan al Fan Festival of Arab World Culture (1994–1998)
Dance India Festival (1996)
Badenya Festival of Manden Culture in New York (West African, 1996–2000)
Quisqueya en el Hudson Festival (Dominican, 1996-ongoing)
Kitchrie Festival (Indo-Caribbean with Rajkumari Cultural Center, 1997-Ongoing)
Nashii Traditsii Concerts (Former Soviet Jewish, 1998–2002)
Filipino Music and Dance Festivals (1999–2003)
Smithsonian Folklife Festival (curated for New York music, 2001)
New York World Festival (Mediterranean, 2002)
Global Beat of the Boroughs Concert Series (various, 2004)
New York World Festival (Gulf Coast, 2004)
Cultural Villages (various, with Riverside Theater, 2006–2007)
Sizhu Silk and Bamboo Music Concert Series (Chinese, 2007)
New York World Festival (Mediterranean, 2007)
Latin Fiesta! (various Latino, 2008)
Sizhu Silk and Bamboo Family Concert Series (Chinese, 2009)
An-Sky Institute for Jewish Culture Series (Jewish, 2009)

Archives

The Center for Traditional Music and Dance has partnered with City Lore and World Music Institute to create the New York World Arts and Culture Archive (NYWACA). This consortium of archival collections is designed to provide a research network of printed materials, audio and visual recordings, and related information on New York City's immigrant and ethnic communities, as well as the history of the performance of world music in New York.

The Archive of the Center for Traditional Music and Dance houses an extensive collection of audio and visual recordings, photographs, and printed materials documenting the center's research and programming over the past four decades. The Archive contains recordings and printed materials from over five hundred events and nearly one thousand performing artists. The bulk of the collection has been digitized and will soon be accessible online to the public. Currently, access to the archive is available by special request.

Recordings and Publications

Over the years CTMD has published numerous audio recordings, films, concert videos, liner notes, and other print publications. Major recordings include the Ethnic Heritage Recording Series and the Global Beat of the Boroughs series, produced in collaboration with Smithsonian Folkways. A full list of recordings and publications is available on CTMD's website.

Global Beat of the Boroughs

Global Beat of the Boroughs is an electronic newsletter that provides information about CTMD-related events, artist profiles, and news from New York City's traditional music scene. The newsletter began in May 2007 and is currently published several times per year.

Fiscal Sponsorship/Technical Assistance

CTMD provides a variety of services and training opportunities for artists, ensembles, and newly formed cultural organizations. These services include: accounting and book keeping services; artist management services; banking / financial support services; budgeting assistance; development/fund-raising; fiscal sponsorship for tax-deductible contributions; letters of support; mail and fax correspondence; tax form administration; project planning; promotion campaigns; stage production; strategic planning; website development.

Center for Art, Tradition, and Cultural Heritage (CATCH)

The Center for Art, Tradition, and Cultural Heritage is a joint project of CTMD, City Lore, World Music Institute, and Society for the Educational Arts. Still in its planning stages, CATCH is being designed as a major cultural center in New York for the presentation and preservation of the city's living cultural heritage. The facilities will include a theatre, gallery, library, music school, study center, cafe, gift shop, and an archive of historic images and recordings. CATCH will present concerts, theatrical productions, exhibitions, storytelling, and poetry presentations. In addition, the facility will also be able to host conferences and provide music classes.

NEA National Heritage Fellowship Award Winners assisted by CTMD

- Adam Popovich, Serbian tamburitza musician
- Dave Tarras, Jewish klezmer clarinetist
- Martin Mulvihill, Irish fiddler
- Pericles Halkias, Epirot Greek clarinetist
- Ilias Kementzides, Pontic Greek lyra player
- Giuseppe and Raffaela DeFranco, traditional Calabrian musicians
- Jack Coen, Irish flute player
- Fatima Kuinova, Bukharan (Central Asian) Jewish singer
- Simon Shaheen, Palestinian violinist and oud player
- Liz Carroll, Irish fiddler
- Donny Golden, Irish stepdancer
- Juan Gutierrez, Puerto Rican bomba and plena musician
- Mick Moloney, Irish musician
- Beyle Schaechter-Gottesman, Yiddish poet, songwriter and folk singer
- Sidiki Conde, Guinean dancer and musician
- Sue Yeon Park, Korean dancer
