= Roen Hufford =

Native Hawaiian Kapa Artist

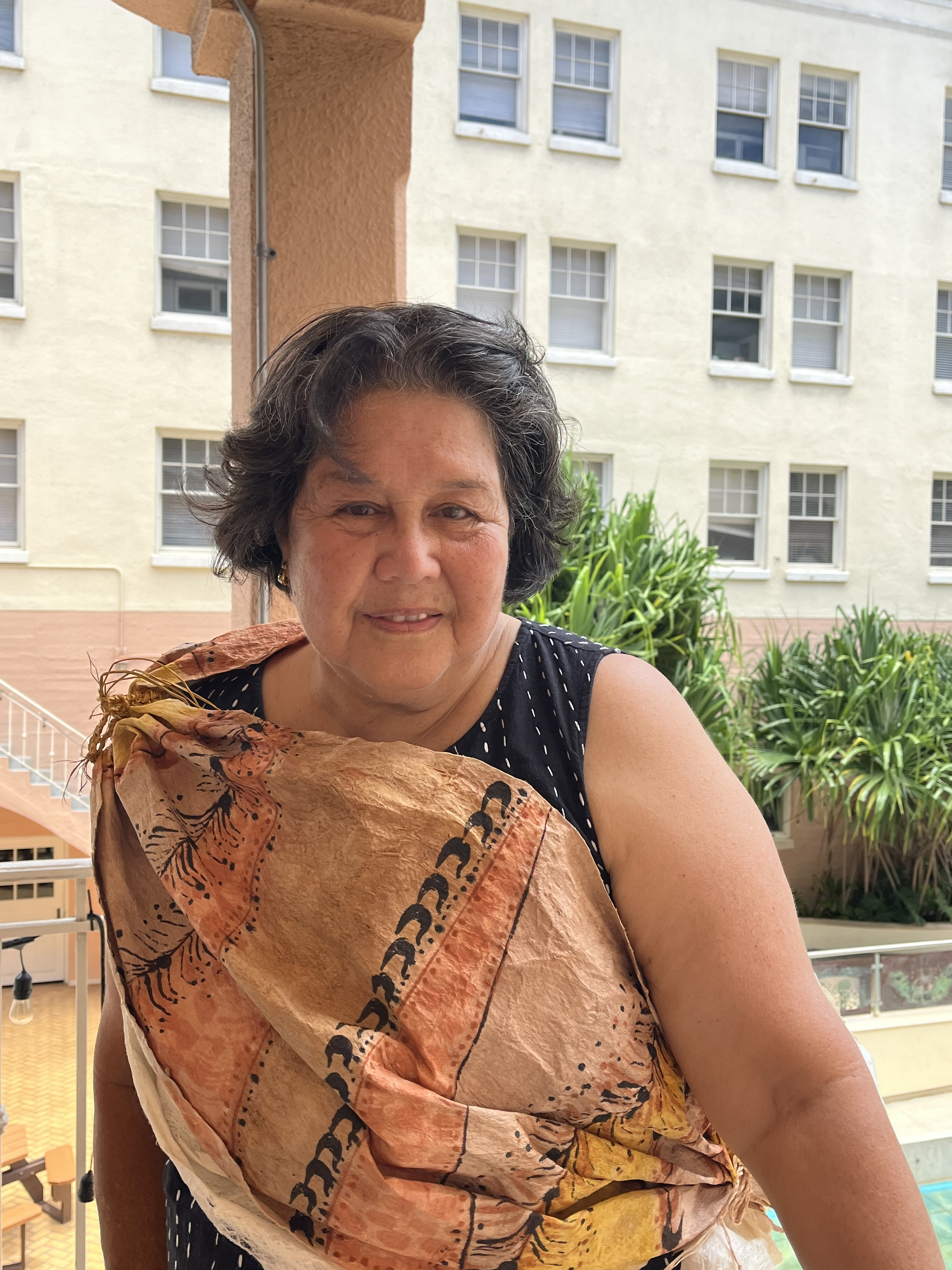
- Born: 1950; Molokaʻi
- Education: University of Hawaiʻi at Mānoa, Pratt Institute
- Awards: National Heritage Fellowship (2023)
- Website: www.roenhufford.com

Roen Halley Kahalewai McDonald Hufford (née Roen Halley Kahalewai McDonald; born 1950) is an American Native Hawaiian kapa artist. In 2023, she was named as one of nine National Heritage Fellows by the National Endowment for the Arts (NEA). Her work has been displayed in the Bishop Museum, and the Hawaii State Art Museum (now Capitol Modern).

== Early life and family ==
Hufford was born in Molokaʻi, 1950. Her mother is Marie Leilehua McDonald, a notable lei maker, who was also named a National Heritage Fellow in 1990.

Hufford has said she originally started learning how to create Kapa with her mother. Hufford's grandmother is Etelka Mahoe Adams. She also grows her own Wauke (Broussonetia papyrifera) to make kapa in addition to other crops on Honopua Farm, the farm her mother and father started in Waimea.

She married Ken Hufford.

== Career ==
From 1968 to 1970, Hufford attended the Pratt Institute. Hufford went on to attend the University of Hawaiʻi at Mānoa, and graduated in 1973 with a Bachelor of Fine Arts degree in art concentrating in ceramics.

On June 10, 2012, a piece of kapa Hufford had made out of wauke and dye from the Jaboticaba was auctioned at a Summer solstice auction to benefit Mala'ai, the culinary garden of Waimea Middle School.

In 2014, Hufford's work was exhibited in the Schaefer International Gallery by the Maui Arts & Cultural Center for the Mōhala Hou Ke Kapa: Kapa Blossoms Anew exhibit. Additionally, she was featured in the documentary film Ka hana kapa (2014).

In 2016, Hufford - alongside her mother, Dalani Tanahy, Bernice Akamine, and others - was featured by the Kahilu Theater's in its exhibit Kapa Kahilu.

In 2018, Hufford led a demonstration on kapa making at Mauna Kea Beach Hotel for the homecoming of several kapa pieces created by Malia Solomon and restored by the Bishop museum. Her work was also featured at the East Hawaii Cultural Center for the “Loli‘ana: A Native Hawaiian Exhibition” in honor of the Merrie Monarch Festival that year.

In 2020, she won second place in the juried exhibition Call + Response. In 2021, Hufford's kapa pieces were on display in the American Savings Bank Lo‘i Gallery.

In February 2023, she was named as one of nine National Heritage Fellowships by the National Endowment for the Arts (NEA) in 2023 alongside R.L. Boyce, Elizabeth James-Perry, Luis Tapia, Wu Man, and others. As a National Heritage Fellow, Hufford was awarded $25,000. Also starting in February 2023 and going throughout the year, her work was displayed by the Hawaii State Art Museum (now Capitol Modern) in the exhibit Accession: recent additions to the Art in Public Places Collection. From March 31, 2023, through May 5, 2023, Hufford's work, alongside Solomon Robert Nui Enos and others, was on display at the Windward Community College in the exhibit ‘Ai Pōhaku, Stone Eaters. From March 11, 2023, to October 15, 2023, her work is on display in the exhibit Ola Ka Noʻeau: Excellence in Hawaiian Artistry at the Bishop Museum.
