= Bua Xou Mua =

Hmong spiritual leader and musician (1915–2013)

- Born: 1915; Bah Whoi Na, Laos
- Died: 2013
- Genres: Hmong traditional music
- Occupation(s): Musician, spiritual leader
- Instrument(s): Gaeng, voice

Bua Xou Mua (1915–2013), also known as Boua Xou Mua, was a Hmong spiritual leader, village chief, and musician. He was known for his recitation of the Hmong oral epic and playing of the gaeng (bamboo mouth organ).

He was born in Ban Whoi Na, a village in northeastern Laos, in 1915. His extended family had lived in this village for generations, following a Hmong uprising in Yunnan. At age 15, under the tutelage of his uncle, he began studying the oral texts of the Hmong including the history of his people's migration from China to Vietnam to Laos. Because the Hmong had no written language until the 1950s, history was transmitted orally. As an adult, Bua raised a family and became the chief of his clan of approximately 400 people in 1960.

In the 1960s, Bua and two of his sons were recruited as mercenaries by the United States Central Intelligence Agency as part of the agency's secret war against the communist Pathet Lao. Bua was wounded twice during these activities. After the United States withdrew in 1973 and fearing communist reprisals, Bua, his wife, and two of their children fled Laos, walking across the mountains in 1976 to Thailand, where they spent two years in a refugee camp.

The family immigrated to the United States in 1978, after which he lived in Portland, Oregon. Despite hardships and discrimination in their new home, Bua remained committed to maintaining his cultural traditions. In 1980 he began working with Hmong youth in Portland in an apprentice program, as well as teaching Hmong culture and customs to Portland school children.

He was a recipient of a 1985 National Heritage Fellowship awarded by the National Endowment for the Arts, which is the United States government's highest honor in the folk and traditional arts.

In 1991 Bua performed his traditional Hmong music at the Dallas Folk Festival, as well as presenting a program at a local multicultural community center where he was reunited with a relative that he had not seen since 1976. While in Dallas, Bua was recorded by a folklorist with the company Documentary Arts. The repertoire included traditional songs that commemorated New Year's celebrations, weddings, and funerals. The recording was released in 1995 on Arhoolie Records, a label dedicated to preserving folk music traditions.

== Discography ==
- Boua Xou Mua, The Music of the Hmong People of Laos, Arhoolie Records CD 446 (1995).

== Filmography ==
- Masters of Traditional Music, Documentary Arts (1991, VHS): includes a segment on Bua
