= I'd Like to Be in Texas for the Roundup in the Spring =

"I'd Like to Be in Texas for the Roundup in the Spring" (sometimes seen as "...in Texas When They Roundup...") is a traditional American cowboy song. Like many traditional works, its authorship is not clearly documented. Sheet music for the song was first appeared in 1927, with Lou Fishback, Carl Copeland and Jack Williams listed as co-writers. The following year, the Texas Folklore Society printed an article by J. Frank Dobie, who claimed it was "an old song he had obtained from Andy Adams".

The song has been sung by many of the great cowboy singers, including Buck Ramsey, Don Edwards, and Red Steagall. It tells of cowboys sitting in the lobby of a New York hotel, reminiscing about Chicago, New Orleans, and other exciting places they have been. When they ask a grizzled older cowboy for his opinion, he recalls the sights and sounds of roundups when he was "...foreman on a cowranch—that's the calling of a king".

Members of the Western Writers of America chose it as one of the Top 100 Western songs of all time.
