= Maupin =

Maupin may refer to:

- Maupin (surname)
- Maupin, Missouri, an unincorporated community
- Maupin, Oregon, a city in United States
- La Maupin or Julie d'Aubigny (1670–1707), French swordswoman and opera singer
