= Birmingham Sunlights =

American gospel group

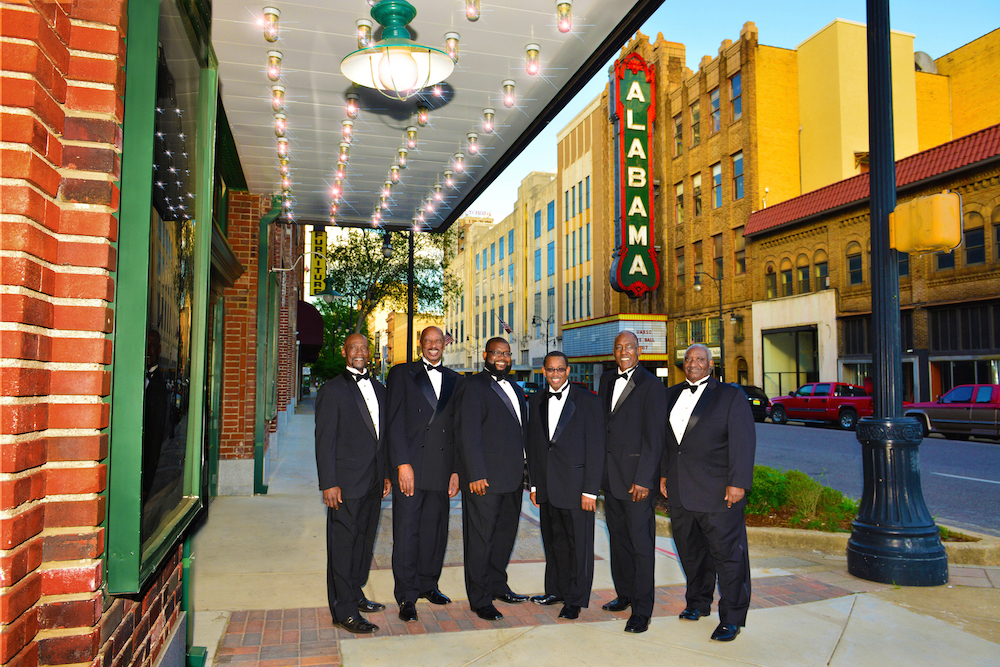
Birmingham Sunlights in 2017

The Birmingham Sunlights is an American a cappella gospel singing group from the Birmingham, Alabama area.

This group developed their style within the Church of Christ, a Christian denominational group in which no instruments are used for performing church music. Brothers James, Barry, and Steve Taylor founded the group in 1978, originally consisting of them and Reginald Speights and Wayne Williams. The group has appeared at numerous music festivals in the United States, including the National Folk Festival. They were designated as Cultural Ambassadors by the United States Department of State and in that role performed in Canada, Italy, France, five African countries, the Caribbean, and Australia.

Their song "All Night" appears on the 2008 album Carry On: Celebrating Twenty Years of the Alabama Folk Arts Apprenticeship Program.

The group was named as a recipient of a 2009 National Heritage Fellowship awarded by the National Endowment for the Arts, which is the United States government's highest honor in the folk and traditional arts.

== Discography ==
=== Solo albums ===
- For Old Time's Sake (1992, Flying Fish)
- In the Garden (2002, Cracker Barrel Old Country Store)

=== Various artist compilation albums ===
- The Deep South Musical Roots Tour (1992, Global Village Music): includes seven songs from The Birmingham Sunlights
- Folk Masters (1993, Smithsonian Folkways): "It's Gonna Rain"
- Blues to Bop & Worldmusic Festival Blues + Gospel Selection (1997, Altrisuoni, Switzerland): "Somewhere to Lay my Head"
- The Alabama Sampler: 10 Years of the Roots of American Music at City Stages (1998, Nextel): "I'm Going to View that Holy City"
- Gospel Relaxation Aquarius (1999, P-Vine, Japan): "Today"
- Carry On: Celebrating Twenty Years of the Alabama Folk Arts Apprenticeship Program (2008, Alabama State Council on the Arts): "All Night"
