= National Heritage Fellowship =

American folk arts award

- Awarded for: Lifetime achievement in folk or traditional arts
- Location: Washington, D.C.
- Country: United States
- Presented by: National Endowment for the Arts
- Reward: $25,000
- First award: 1982
- Final award: present
- Website: https://www.arts.gov/honors/heritage

The National Heritage Fellowship is a lifetime honor presented to master folk and traditional artists by the National Endowment for the Arts. Similar to Japan's Living National Treasure award, the Fellowship is the United States government's highest honor in the folk and traditional arts. It is a one-time only award and fellows must be living citizens or permanent residents of the United States. Each year, fellowships are presented to between seven and fifteen artists or groups at a ceremony in Washington, D.C.

The Fellows are nominated by individual citizens, with an average of over 200 nominations per year. From that pool of candidates, recommendations are made by a rotating panel of specialists, including one layperson, as well as folklorists and others with a variety of forms of cultural expertise. The recommendations are then reviewed by the National Council on the Arts, with the final decisions made by the chairperson of the National Endowment for the Arts. As of 2024, 487 artists in a wide variety of fields have received Fellowships.

== History ==
The program was officially founded in 1982 by Bess Lomax Hawes, the first director of the Folk and Traditional Arts Program at the NEA, following a five-year period of development. In 1982, the monetary award associated with the Fellowship was $5,000; in 1993, it was increased to $10,000 and since 2009, the award amount is $25,000, which is considered "enough to make a difference, but not enough to go to anyone's head". Each recipient receives a certificate of honor, the monetary award, and a congratulatory letter from the President of the United States.

The annual recognition events are held in the Fall and consist of an awards ceremony, a banquet, and a concert that is open to the public. Over the years, the awards ceremony has been held at different locations in the US capital city, including the NEA headquarters, Ford's Theatre, George Washington University, the Library of Congress, and for the first time at the White House in 1995. Since 2000, the banquet has been held in the Great Hall of the Library of Congress. The concert features musical performances, craft demonstrations, and interviews with the honorees. Masters of ceremonies at the concerts have included folksinger Pete Seeger, actress Ruby Dee, author Studs Terkel, journalist Charles Kuralt, and since 1997 Nick Spitzer, the host of public radio program American Routes. Beginning in 2010, the Fellowship concerts have been streamed live on the NEA website and archived on YouTube.

In 2000, the NEA instituted the Bess Lomax Hawes Award in conjunction with the Fellowships, "given to an individual for achievements in fostering excellence, ensuring vitality, and promoting public appreciation of the folk and traditional arts". The Hawes Award has been given annually since 2000 to recognize "artists whose contributions, primarily through teaching, advocacy, and organizing and preserving important repertoires, have greatly benefited their artistic tradition. It also recognizes individuals, such as producers and activists, who have comprehensively increased opportunities for and public visibility of traditional artists."

== Publications ==
- A companion volume titled American Folk Masters: The National Heritage Fellows was published in 1992 to accompany a traveling exhibition (1991–1994) called "America's Living Folk Traditions" that featured the artistry of 36 Fellowship recipients.
- A two-volume biographical dictionary of the award winners from the first 20 years was published in 2001, titled Masters of Traditional Arts.
- A young readers book featuring five of the National Heritage Fellows entitled Extraordinary Ordinary People: Five American Masters of Traditional Arts was published in 2006.

== Winners ==
Awardees have included Native American basket weavers, African American blues musicians, traditional fiddlers, Mexican American accordionists, and all manner of traditional artisans and performers of numerous ethnic backgrounds.

1982 | 1983 | 1984 | 1985 | 1986 | 1987 | 1988 | 1989 | 1990

1991 | 1992 | 1993 | 1994 | 1995 | 1996 | 1997 | 1998 | 1999 | 2000

2001 | 2002 | 2003 | 2004 | 2005 | 2006 | 2007 | 2008 | 2009 | 2010

2011 | 2012 | 2013 | 2014 | 2015 | 2016 | 2017 | 2018 | 2019 | 2020

2021 | 2022 | 2023 | 2024 | 2025 | 2026

National Heritage Fellowship winners are:

=== 1982 ===
- Dewey Balfa, Cajun fiddler
- Joe Heaney, Irish sean-nós singer
- Tommy Jarrell, Appalachian fiddler
- Bessie Jones, singer, member of the Georgia Sea Island Singers
- George López, Santos woodcarver
- Brownie McGhee, blues guitarist
- Hugh McGraw, shape note singer
- Lydia Mendoza, Mexican American singer
- Bill Monroe, bluegrass musician
- Elijah Pierce, carver and painter
- Adam Popovich, Tamburitza musician
- Georgeann Robinson, Osage ribbonworker
- Duff Severe, saddlemaker
- Philip Simmons, ornamental ironworker and blacksmith
- Sanders "Sonny" Terry, blues musician

=== 1983 ===
- Sister Mildred Barker, Shaker singer
- Rafael Cepeda, bomba dancer and musician
- Ray Hicks, Appalachian storyteller
- Stanley Hicks, Appalachian musician and storyteller
- John Lee Hooker, blues guitarist and singer
- Mike Manteo, Sicilian marionettist (Marionette maker)
- Narciso Martínez, accordionist and composer
- Lanier Meaders, potter from Georgia
- Almeda Riddle, ballad singer
- Simon St. Pierre, French American fiddler from Maine
- Joe Shannon (piper), Irish piper
- Alex Stewart, copper and woodworker
- Ada Thomas, Chitimacha basketmaker
- Lucinda Toomer, African American quilter
- Lem Ward, duck decoy maker and painter
- Dewey Williams, shape note singer

=== 1984 ===
- Clifton Chenier, zydeco accordionist
- Bertha Cook, knotted bedspread maker
- Joseph Cormier, violinist
- Elizabeth Cotten, guitarist and songwriter
- Burlon Craig, potter
- Albert Fahlbusch, hammered dulcimer maker and player
- Janie Hunter, singer and storyteller
- Mary Jane Manigault, seagrass basket maker
- Genevieve Mougin, lace maker
- Martin Mulvihill, fiddler
- Howard "Sandman" Sims, tap dancer
- Ralph Stanley, Appalachian banjo player and singer
- Margaret Tafoya, potter
- Dave Tarras, klezmer clarinetist
- Paul Tiulana, Eskimo maskmaker, dancer, and singer
- Cleofes Vigil, storyteller and singer
- Emily Kau'i Zuttermeister, hula master

=== 1985 ===
- Eppie Archuleta, weaver
- Alice New Holy Blue Legs, Oglala Lakota quillwork artist
- Periklis Halkias, clarinetist
- Jimmy Jausoro, accordionist
- Meali'i Kalama, quilter
- Lily May Ledford, Appalachian musician and singer
- Leif Melgaard, woodcarver
- Bua Xou Mua, Hmong musician
- Julio Negrón-Rivera, instrument maker
- Glenn Ohrlin, cowboy singer, storyteller, and illustrator
- Henry Townsend, blues musician and songwriter
- Horace "Spoons" Williams, spoons and bones player and poet

=== 1986 ===
- Alphonse "Bois Sec" Ardoin, Creole accordionist
- Earnest Bennett, whittler
- Helen Cordero, potter
- Sonia Domsch, bobbin lace maker
- Canray Fontenot, Creole fiddler
- John Jackson, songster and guitarist
- Peou Khatna, Cambodian court dancer and choreographer
- Valerio Longoria, accordionist
- Doc Tate Nevaquaya, Comanche flutist
- Luis Ortega, rawhide worker
- Ola Belle Reed, Appalachian banjo picker/singer
- Jennie Thlunaut, Chilkat blanket weaver
- Nimrod Workman, Appalachian ballad singer

=== 1987 ===
- Juan Alindato, Carnival maskmaker
- Louis Bashell, polka musician
- Genoveva Castellanoz, corona maker
- Thomas Edison Ford, cowboy singer and storyteller
- Fujima Kansuma, Japanese classical dancer
- Claude Joseph Johnson, religious singer and orator
- Raymond Kane, slack key guitarist and singer
- Wade Mainer, bluegrass banjoist
- Sylvester McIntosh, singer and bandleader
- Allison "Tootie" Montana, Mardi Gras Indian chief and costume maker
- Alex Moore, Sr., blues pianist
- Emilio and Senaida Romero, tin embroiderers
- Newton Washburn, split ash basketmaker

=== 1988 ===
- Pedro Ayala, accordionist
- Kepka Belton, egg painter
- Amber Densmore, quilter and needleworker
- Michael Flatley, Irish step dancer
- Sister Rosalia Haberl, bobbin lacemaker
- John Dee Holeman, dancer, musician, and singer
- Albert "Sunnyland Slim" Luandrew, blues pianist and singer
- Yang Fang Nhu, weaver and embroiderer
- Kenny Sidle, fiddler
- Willie Mae Ford Smith, gospel singer
- Clyde "Kindy" Sproat, cowboy singer and ukulele player
- Arthel "Doc" Watson, guitarist and singer

=== 1989 ===
- John Cephas, Piedmont blues guitarist and singer
- The Fairfield Four, a capella gospel singers
- José Gutiérrez, Jarocho musician and singer
- Richard Avedis Hagopian, oud player
- Christy Hengel, concertina maker
- Ilias Kementzides, lyra player
- Ethel Kvalheim, rosemaler
- Vanessa Paukeigope Morgan, Kiowa regalia maker
- Mabel E. Murphy, quilter
- LaVaughn Robinson, tap dancer and choreographer
- Earl Scruggs, banjo player
- Harry V. Shourds, wildlife decoy carver
- Chesley Goseyun Wilson, Apache fiddle maker

=== 1990 ===
- Howard Armstrong, string band musician
- Em Bun, silk weaver
- Nati Cano, Mariachi musician, leader of Mariachi los Camperos
- Giuseppe and Raffaela DeFranco, Southern Italian musicians and dancers
- Maude Kegg, Ojibwe storyteller and craftswoman
- Kevin Locke, Lakota flute player, singer, and dancer
- Marie McDonald, lei maker
- Wally McRae, cowboy poet
- Art Moilanen, accordionist
- Emilio Rosado, woodcarver
- Robert Spicer, flatfoot dancer
- Douglas Wallin, Appalachian ballad singer

=== 1991 ===
- Etta Baker, guitarist
- George Blake, Hupa-Yurok craftsman
- Jack Coen, flautist
- Rose Frank, cornhusk weaver
- Eduardo "Lalo" Guerrero, singer, guitarist, and composer
- Khamvong Insixiengmai, singer
- Don King, western saddlemaker
- Riley "B.B." King, bluesman
- Esther Littlefield, Tlingit regalia maker
- Seisho "Harry" Nakasone, musician
- Irvan Perez, Isleño décima singer and woodcarver
- Morgan Sexton, Appalachian banjo player and singer
- Nikitas Tsimouris, bagpipe player
- Gussie Wells, quilter
- Arbie Williams, quilter
- Melvin Wine, Appalachian fiddler

=== 1992 ===
- Francisco Aguabella, drummer
- Jerry Brown, stoneware potter
- Walker Calhoun, Cherokee musician, dancer and teacher
- Clyde Davenport, Appalachian fiddler
- Belle Deacon, basketmaker
- Nora Ezell, quilter
- Gerald R. Hawpetoss, Menominee/Potawatomi regalia maker
- Fatima Kuinova, Bukharan Jewish singer
- John Naka, bonsai sculptor
- Marc Savoy, accordion maker/musician
- Ng Sheung-Chi, muk'yu folk singer
- Othar Turner, fife player
- T. Viswanathan, flutist and vocalist

=== 1993 ===
- Santiago Almeida, conjunto musician
- Kenny Baker, bluegrass fiddler
- Inez Catalon, French Creole singer
- Nicholas and Elena Charles, Yupik woodcarvers, mask makers, and skin sewers
- Charles Hankins, boatbuilder
- Nālani Kanakaʻole and Pualani Kanaka'ole Kanahel, hula masters
- Everett Kapayou, Meskwaki singer
- McIntosh County Shouters, spiritual/shout performers
- Elmer Miller, bit and spur maker, and silversmith
- Jack Owens, blues singer and guitarist
- Mone and Vanxay Saenphimmachak, weavers, needleworkers, and loom makers
- Liang-xing Tang, pipa player

=== 1994 ===
- Clarence Fountain and The Blind Boys, gospel singers
- Liz Carroll, fiddler
- Mary Mitchell Gabriel, Passamaquoddy basketmaker
- Johnny Gimble, Western swing fiddler
- Frances Varos Graves, colcha embroiderer
- Violet Hilbert, Skagit storyteller
- Sosei Shizuye Matsumoto, Chado tea ceremony master
- D. L. Menard, Cajun songwriter and musician
- Simon Shaheen, oud player
- Lily Vorperian, Marash-style embroiderer
- Elder Roma Wilson, gospel blues harmonica player

=== 1995 ===
- Mary Holiday Black, Navajo basketweaver
- Lyman Enloe, fiddler
- Donny Golden, Irish step dancer
- Wayne Henderson, luthier
- Bea Ellis Hensley, blacksmith
- Nathan Jackson, Tlingit woodcarver, metalsmith, dancer
- Danongan Kalanduyan, kulintang musician
- Robert Jr. Lockwood, Delta blues guitarist
- Israel López, bassist, composer, and bandleader
- Nellie Star Boy Menard, Sicangu Lakota quiltmaker
- Bao Mo-Li, jing erhu player
- Buck Ramsey, cowboy poet and singer

=== 1996 ===
- Obo Addy, drummer
- Betty Pisio Christenson, egg decorator
- Paul Dahlin, fiddler
- Juan Gutiérrez, drummer
- Solomon and Richard Ho'opi'i, Hawaiian singers
- Will Keys, banjo player
- Joaquin Flores Lujan, blacksmith
- Eva McAdams, Shoshone regalia maker
- John Mealing and Cornelius Wright, Jr., railroad worksong singers
- Vernon Owens, stoneware potter
- Dolly Spencer, Inupiat dollmaker

=== 1997 ===
- Edward Babb, shout band leader
- Charles Brown, blues pianist, singer and composer
- Gladys Clark, spinner and weaver
- Georgia Harris, Catawba potter
- Hua Wenyi, Kunqu opera singer
- Ali Akbar Khan, classical sarod player
- Ramón José López, santero and metalsmith
- Jim and Jesse McReynolds, bluegrass musicians
- Phong Nguyen (Nguyễn Thuyết Phong), musician and ethnomusicologist
- Hystercine Rankin, quilter
- Francis Whitaker, blacksmith and ornamental ironworker

=== 1998 ===
- Apsara Ensemble, Cambodian traditional dancers and musicians
- Eddie Blazonczyk, musician and bandleader
- Dale Calhoun, boat builder
- Bruce Caesar, Sac and Fox-Pawnee, German silversmith
- Antonio De La Rosa, conjunto accordionist
- Epstein Brothers, Klezmer musicians
- Sophia George, Yakama – Colville beadworker
- Nadjeschda Overgaard, hardanger embroidery needleworker
- Harilaos Papapostolou, Greek Byzantine chanter
- Claude "Fiddler" Williams, jazz and swing fiddler
- Pops Staples, gospel and blues musician

=== 1999 ===
- Frisner Augustin, Haitian drummer
- Lila Greengrass Blackdeer, Ho-Chunk Black Ash basketmaker and needleworker
- Shirley Caesar, gospel singer
- Alfredo Campos, horse hair hitcher
- Mary Louise Defender Wilson, Dakotah-Hidatsa traditionalist and storyteller
- Jimmy "Slyde" Godbolt, tapdancer
- Ulysses Goode, Western Mono basketmaker
- Bob Holt, Ozark fiddler
- Zakir Hussain, tabla player
- Elliott "Ellie" Mannette, steel pan builder, tuner and player
- Mick Moloney, Irish musician
- Eudokia Sorochaniuk, Ukrainian American weaver and textile artist
- Ralph W. Stanley, boatbuilder

=== 2000 ===
- Bounxou Chanthraphone, weaver
- The Dixie Hummingbirds, gospel quartet
- José González, hammock weaver
- Nettie Jackson, Klickitat basketmaker
- Santiago Jiménez Jr., accordionist
- Genoa Keawe, singer and ukulele player
- Frankie Manning, Lindy Hop dancer and choreographer
- Joe Willie "Pinetop" Perkins, blues piano player
- Konstantinos Pilarinos, Orthodox Byzantine icon woodcarver
- Chris Strachwitz, record producer and label founder
- Dorothy Thompson, weaver
- Felipe García Villamil, drummer and santero
- Don Walser, singer and guitarist

=== 2001 ===
- Celestino Avilés, santero
- Mozell Benson, quilter
- Wilson "Boozoo" Chavis, Creole zydeco accordionist
- Hazel Dickens, Appalachian singer and songwriter
- João Oliveira dos Santos (Mestre João Grande), Capoeira Angola master
- Evalena Henry, Apache basketweaver
- Peter Kyvelos, oud maker
- Eddie Pennington, thumbpicking-style guitarist
- Qi Shu Fang, Beijing Opera performer
- Seiichi Tanaka, Taiko drummer and dojo founder
- Dorothy Trumpold, rug weaver
- Fred Tsoodle, Kiowa sacred song leader
- Joseph Wilson, folklorist

=== 2002 ===
- Ralph Blizard, fiddler
- Loren Bommelyn, Tolowa tradition bearer
- Kevin Burke, fiddler
- Rose Cree and Francis Cree, Ojibwe basketmakers and storytellers
- Luderin Darbone and Edwin Duhon, Cajun fiddler and accordionist
- Nadim Dlaikan, nye (reed flute) player
- David "Honeyboy" Edwards, blues guitarist and singer
- Flory Jagoda, singer, songwriter, and guitarist
- Clara Neptune Keezer, Passamaquoddy basketmaker
- Bob McQuillen, contra dance musician and composer
- Jean Ritchie, Appalachian musician and songwriter
- Domingo Saldivar, Conjunto accordionist
- Losang Samten, Tibetan monk and creator of sandpaintings

=== 2003 ===
- Jesus Arriada, Johnny Curutchet, Martin Goicoechea and Jesus Goni, Basque (Bertsolari) poets
- Rosa Elena Egipciaco, mundillo (Puerto Rican bobbin lace) maker
- Agnes "Oshanee" Kenmille, Bitterroot Salish/Kutenai beadworker and regalia maker
- Norman Kennedy, weaver, singer, storyteller
- Roberto Martinez and Lorenzo Martinez, father and son musicians
- Norma Miller, swing dancer and choreographer
- Carmencristina Moreno, singer, composer, teacher
- Ron Poast, Hardanger fiddle maker
- Felipe I. Ruak and Joseph K. Ruak, father and son Carolinian stick dancers
- Manoochehr Sadeghi, santur player
- Nicholas Toth, diving helmet builder

=== 2004 ===
- Anjani Ambegaokar, Kathak dancer
- Charles "Chuck" T. Campbell, Gospel steel guitarist
- Joe Derrane, Irish-American button accordionist
- Jerry Douglas, Dobro player
- Gerald "Subiyay" Miller, Skokomish tradition bearer, carver, basket maker
- Chum Ngek, Cambodian musician and teacher
- Milan Opacich, Tamburitza instrument maker
- Eliseo Rodriguez and Paula Rodriguez, husband and wife straw appliqué artists
- Koko Taylor, blues musician
- Yuqin Wang and Zhengli Xu, Chinese rod puppeteers

=== 2005 ===
- Eldrid Skjold Arntzen, rosemaler
- Earl Barthé, building artisan
- Chuck Brown, musical innovator
- Janette Carter, country musician
- Michael Doucet, Cajun fiddler, composer, band leader
- Big Joe Duskin, blues and boogie-woogie pianist
- Jerry Grcevich, Tamburitza musician, prim player
- Wanda Jackson, country, rockabilly and gospel singer
- Grace Henderson Nez, Navajo weaver
- Herminia Albarrán Romero, paper cutting artist
- Beyle Schaechter-Gottesman, Yiddish singer, songwriter, and poet
- Albertina Walker, gospel singer
- James Ka'upena Wong, Hawaiian chanter

=== 2006 ===
- Charles M. Carrillo, santero
- Delores Elizabeth Churchill, Haida cedar bark weaver
- Henry Gray, blues piano player and singer
- Doyle Lawson, gospel and bluegrass singer, bandleader
- Esther Martinez, Tewa linguist and storyteller
- Diomedes Matos, master string instrument maker
- George Naʻope, hula master
- Wilho Saari, kantele player
- Mavis Staples, gospel, rhythm and blues singer
- Nancy Sweezy, folklorist and potter
- Treme Brass Band, New Orleans brass band

=== 2007 ===
- Nicholas Benson, stone letter cutter and calligrapher
- Sidiki Conde, Guinean dancer and musician
- Violet Kazue de Cristoforo, Haiku poet and historian
- Roland Freeman, photo documentarian, author, and exhibit Curator
- Pat Courtney Gold, Wasco sally bag weaver
- Eddie Kamae, Hawaiian musician
- Agustin Lira, Chicano singer and musician,
- Julia Parker, Kashia Pomo basketmaker
- Mary Jane Queen, Appalachian musician
- Joe Thompson, string band musician
- Irvin Trujillo, Rio Grande weaver
- Elaine Hoffman Watts, Klezmer musician

=== 2008 ===
- Horace Axtell, Nez Perce drum maker, singer, tradition-bearer
- Dale Harwood, saddlemaker
- Bettye Kimbrell, quilter
- Jeronimo E. Lozano, Peruvian retablo maker
- Oneida Hymn Singers of Wisconsin
- Sue Yeon Park, Korean dancer and musician
- Moges Seyoum, Ethiopian liturgical minister and scholar
- Jelon Vieira, Capoeira master
- Michael White, traditional jazz musician and bandleader
- Mac Wiseman, Bluegrass musician
- Walter Murray Chiesa, traditional arts specialist and advocate

=== 2009 ===
- Birmingham Sunlights, five-man, four-part harmony a cappella gospel group
- Edwin Colón Zayas, Puerto Rican cuatro
- Chitresh Das, Kathak dancer and choreographer
- LeRoy Graber, German-Russian willow basketmaker from South Dakota
- "Queen" Ida Guillory, Zydeco musician and singer
- Dudley Laufman, contra and barn dance caller and musician
- Amma D. McKen, Yoruba Orisha singer
- Joel Nelson, Cowboy poet
- Teri Rofkar, Tlingit weaver and basketmaker
- Mike Seeger, folk musician, cultural scholar
- Sophiline Cheam Shapiro, Cambodian classical dancer and choreographer

=== 2010 ===
- Yacub Addy, Ghanaian drum master, preserves music of the Ga people
- Jim "Texas Shorty" Chancellor, Texas fiddler
- Gladys Kukana Grace, Lauhala (palm leaf) weaver
- Mary Jackson, Gullah sweetgrass basketweaver
- Delano Floyd "Del" McCoury, Bluegrass guitarist and singer
- Judith McCulloh, Folklorist and editor
- Kamala Lakshmi Narayanan, Bharatanatyam Indian dancer
- Mike Rafferty, Irish flute player
- Ezequiel Torres, Afro-Cuban drummer and drum-builder

=== 2011 ===
- Laverne Brackens, Quilter
- Carlinhos Pandeiro de Ouro, Frame drum player and percussionist
- Bo Dollis, Mardi Gras Indian Chief
- Jim Griffith, folklorist
- Roy and PJ Hirabayashi, Taiko drum leaders
- Ledward Kaapana, Ukulele and slack key guitarist
- Frank Newsome, Old Regular Baptist singer
- Warner Williams, Piedmont blues songster
- Yuri Yunakov, Bulgarian saxophonist

=== 2012 ===
- Mike Auldridge, dobro player
- Paul and Darlene Bergren, dog sled and snowshoe designers and builders
- Harold A. Burnham, master shipwright
- Albert B. Head, traditional arts advocate
- Leonardo "Flaco" Jiménez, accordionist
- Lynne Yoshiko Nakasone, dancer
- Molly Neptune Parker, Passamaquoddy basketmaker
- The Paschall Brothers, gospel quartet
- Andy Statman, klezmer clarinetist, mandolinist, and composer

=== 2013 ===
- Sheila Kay Adams, Storyteller and musician
- Ralph Burns, Pyramid Lake Paiute storyteller
- Verónica Castillo, Ceramicist and clay sculptor
- Séamus Connolly, Irish fiddler and scholar
- Nicolae Feraru, Cimbalom player
- Carol Fran, Swamp blues singer and pianist (both French Creole and English singer)
- Pauline Hillaire, Lummi artist, teacher, and storyteller
- David Ivey, Sacred Harp singer
- Ramón "Chunky" Sánchez, Chicano musician

=== 2014 ===
- Henry Arquette, Mohawk basketmaker
- Manuel "Cowboy" Donley, Tejano musician and singer
- Kevin Doyle, Irish step dancer
- The Holmes Brothers, blues, gospel, and R&B band
- Yvonne Walker Keshick, Odawa quill artist
- Carolyn Mazloomi, quilting community advocate
- Vera Nakonechny, Ukrainian embroiderer and bead worker
- Singing and Praying Bands of Maryland and Delaware, African-American religious singers
- Rufus White, Omaha traditional singer and drum group leader

=== 2015 ===
- Rahim AlHaj, oud player and composer
- Michael Alpert, Yiddish musician and tradition bearer
- Mary Lee Bendolph, Lucy Mingo, and Loretta Pettway — quilters of Gee's Bend
- Dolly Jacobs, circus aerialist
- Yary Livan, Cambodian ceramicist
- Daniel Sheehy, ethnomusicologist/folklorist
- Drink Small, blues artist
- Gertrude Yukie Tsutsumi, Japanese classical dancer
- Sidonka Wadina, Slovak straw artist/egg decorator

=== 2016 ===
- Bryan Akipa, Dakota flute maker and player
- Monk Boudreaux, Mardi Gras Indian craftsman and musician
- Billy McComiskey, Irish button accordionist
- Artemio Posadas, Master Huastecan son musician and advocate
- Clarissa Rizal, Tlingit ceremonial regalia maker
- Theresa Secord, Penobscot Nation ash/sweetgrass basketmaker
- Bounxeung Synanonh, Laotian khaen player
- Michael Vlahovich, master shipwright
- Leona Waddell, white oak basketmaker

=== 2017 ===
- Norik Astvatsaturov, Armenian repoussé metal artist
- Anna Brown Ehlers, Chilkat weaver
- Modesto Cepeda, bomba and plena musician
- Ella Jenkins, children's folk singer and musician
- Dwight Lamb, Danish button accordionist and Missouri-style fiddler
- Thomas Maupin, old-time buckdancer
- Cyril Pahinui, Hawaiian slack key guitarist
- Phil Wiggins, acoustic blues harmonica player
- Eva Ybarra, conjunto accordionist and bandleader

=== 2018 ===
- Feryal Abbasi-Ghnaim, Palestinian embroiderer
- Eddie Bond, Appalachian fiddler
- Kelly Church, Gun Lake Band Potawatomi black ash basket maker
- Marion Coleman, African American quilter
- Manuel Cuevas, Mexican-American rodeo tailor
- Ofelia Esparza, Chicana altarista (Day of the Dead altar maker)
- Barbara Lynn, African American R&B guitarist
- Don and Cindy Roy, French-American musicians
- Ethel Raim, advocate for customary music and dance

=== 2019 ===
- Dan Ansotegui, Basque musician and tradition bearer
- Grant Bulltail, Crow storyteller
- Linda Goss, African-American storyteller
- James F. Jackson, leatherworker
- Balla Kouyaté, balafon player and djeli
- Josephine Lobato, Spanish colcha embroiderer
- Rich Smoker, decoy carver
- Las Tesoros de San Antonio: Beatriz "La Paloma del Norte" Llamas and Blanquita "Blanca Rosa" Rodríguez, Tejano singers
- Bob Fulcher, folklorist

=== 2020 ===
- William Bell, soul singer and songwriter
- Onnik Dinkjian, Armenian folk and liturgical singer
- Zakarya and Naomi Diouf, West African diasporic dancers
- Karen Ann Hoffman, Iroquois raised beadworker
- Los Matachines de la Santa Cruz de la Ladrillera, traditional religious dancers
- John Morris, old-time fiddler and banjo player
- Suni Paz, Nueva Canción singer and songwriter
- Wayne Valliere, birchbark canoe builder
- Hugo N. Morales, radio producer and radio network builder

=== 2021 ===
- Cedric Burnside, Hill Country blues musician
- Tagumpay De Leon, Rondalla musician
- Anita Fields, Osage ribbon worker
- Los Lobos, Mexican-American band
- Joanie Madden, Irish flute player
- Reginald McLaughlin, tap dancer
- Nellie Vera Sánchez, Mundillo master weaver
- Winnsboro Easter Rock Ensemble, Easter Rock spiritual ensemble
- Tom Davenport, filmmaker, documentarian, and media curator

=== 2022 ===
- Michael Cleveland, bluegrass fiddler
- Eva Enciñias, flamenco artist
- Excelsior Band, brass band musicians
- Stanley Jacobs, quelbe flutist and bandleader
- The Legendary Ingramettes, gospel musicians
- Francis Palani Sinenci, Hawaiian hale builder
- Tsering Wangmo Satho, Tibetan opera singer and dancer
- C. Brian Williams, step artist and producer
- Shaka Zulu, Black masking craftsman, stilt dancer and musician
- TahNibaa Naataanii, Navajo (Diné) textile artist and weaver

=== 2023 ===
- R. L. Boyce, Hill country blues musician
- Ed Eugene Carriere, Suquamish basket maker
- Michael A. Cummings, African-American quilter
- Joe DeLeon "Little Joe" Hernández, Tejano musician
- Roen Hufford, Hawaiian kapa maker
- Elizabeth James-Perry, Wampanoag wampum and fiber artist
- Luis Tapia, Hispano wood sculptor
- Wu Man, Pipa musician
- Nick Spitzer, folklife presenter, educator and radio producer

=== 2024 ===
- Bril Barrett, tap dancer
- Fabian Debora, Chicano muralist
- Rosie Flores, Rockabilly and Country musician
- Trimble Gilbert, Gwich'in fiddler
- Todd Goings, carousel carver and restorationist
- Susan Hudson, Navajo/Diné quilter
- Pat Johnson, community activist and organizer
- June Kuramoto, Koto musician
- Sochietah Ung, Cambodian costume maker and dancer
- Zuni Olla Maidens, traditional Zuni dancers and singers

=== 2025 ===
- Carmen Baron, Mexican folk costume maker and dancer
- Peniel Guerrier, Haitian dancer, drummer and educator
- Adrienne Reiko Iwanaga, Bon Odori dancer, teacher and choreographer
- Ernie Marsh, bit and spur maker, silversmith
- Edward Poullard, Creole musician
- Steven Tamayo, traditional Lakota artist and educator
- Ukrainian Bandurist Chorus of North America, men's choral and bandura ensemble

=== 2026 ===
- Juan Díes and Victor G. Pichardo, Mexican folk musicians
- Belen Escobedo, Conjunto Tejano fiddler
- Giovanni Hidalgo, Latin percussionist
- Gerry Milnes, folklorist and documentarian
- Lloyd Kumulā‘au Sing Jr. and May Haunani Balino-Sing, Hawaiian twined basketry artists
- Patrick Olwell, wooden flute maker
- Frank Rabon, CHamoru dancer and choreographer
- Cary Schwarz, saddlemaker and leather artist
