= Maupin (surname) =

Notable French surname with diverse individuals in various fields

Maupin is a French surname. Notable people with the surname include:

- Armistead Maupin (born 1944), American writer
- Audry Maupin (1972–1994), boyfriend of Florence Rey, involved in a 1994 shoot-out in Paris
- Bennie Maupin (born 1940), American musician
- Claudia Maupin (1936–2013), American murder victim
- David Maupin, American gallery director and co-founder of Lehmann Maupin Gallery
- Harry Maupin (1872–1952), baseball pitcher
- Keith Matthew Maupin (1983–2004), U.S. Army soldier
- Robert Lee Maupin (1918–1992), also known as Robert Beck or Iceberg Slim, author
- Simon Maupin (before 1625–1668), French architect
- Thomas Maupin (born 1938), American Buck Dancer
