= Grace Henderson Nez =

Navajo weaver (1913–2006)

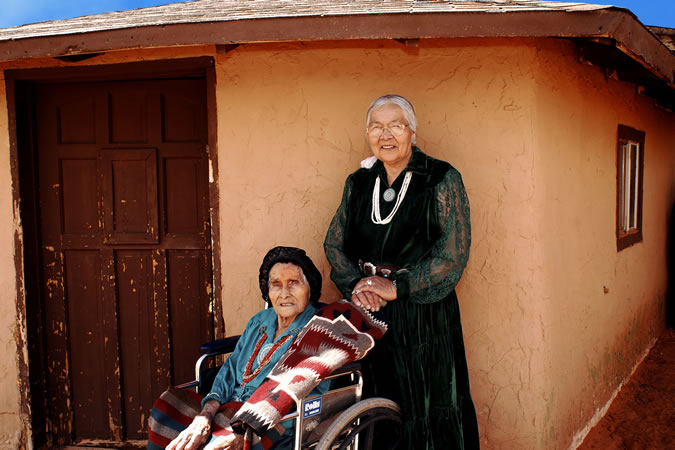
Henderson Nez (seated) in 2005

Grace Henderson Nez (May 10, 1913 – July 14, 2006) was a Navajo weaver, known for her traditional designs. Her main styles were old designs from the 19th century and Ganado style. Some of her work was demonstrated at the Hubbell Trading Post, which is home to an archive of works from various Navajo weavers. Before her death in 2006, she was able to win two lifetime achievement awards for her work, including a National Heritage Fellowship from the National Endowment for the Arts.

== Biography ==
Grace Henderson Nez was born in 1913 in Ganado, Arizona and died in 2006 in Flagstaff, Arizona. Henderson Nez, her daughter Mary Lee Begay and granddaughters Gloria Begay and Lenah Begay are known for their achievements and quality in Navajo weaving. Henderson Nez was born into the Coyote Pass People Clan for the start of the Red Streaked People Clan on the Navajo Reservation in Ganado, Arizona. On the reservation, she lived in a hogan, which can be in various shapes made out of timber, stone, dirt, and bark. The rising sun brings wealth and good fortune, therefore the doors would face east to better capture it. Navajo families owned sheep as this was their main food source and served many other purposes. The women were tasked with raising the sheep, then at the appropriate time they would use various methods to turn the wool into yarns for weaving.

Henderson Nez's mother and grandmother taught her how to weave at about the age of 5. In her lifetime, Henderson Nez made several rugs. When she was done with one she would sell it and move on to the next rug. Weaving is considered a woman's art form; the income from the sale of a rug would help make the woman in the tribe more independent. Though she followed many of the traditional ways of living, like living in a hogan on the reservation, the modern world was not lost on Henderson Nez. She encouraged her children and grandchildren to attend college in order to attain a higher level of education.

In 1941, Henderson Nez gave birth to her daughter Mary Lee Begay on the Navajo Reservation in Ganado, Arizona. The women carry the tradition of weaving through their generations. They see this as a way to strengthen their relationships and bond over a common art form. Henderson Nez taught her daughter how to weave at about the age of 8, and as Begay got older her mother encouraged her to develop her own style of weaving. Since all women in the family can weave, they will often work on projects together as a family, as another way to bond. Henderson Nez and Begay choose to alter this to help build their identities as separate artists. Another reason they did not collaborate on projects was based on Henderson Nez's desire to keep the peace in her family.

== Navajo weaving ==
Navajo weavings became popular among Euro-Americans in the late 19th century and early 20th century. In many homes the Navajo rugs were the focal point of the room, the colors and design of the rug helped to establish the color scheme of the room and allow for other decorations to be introduced. For the consumers having a Navajo rug showed their spiritual understanding, for the Navajo women it showed that they could be a part of the white culture. Since the rugs were bought by Euro-Americans, the weavers began to change the styles and colors to better accommodate their preferences.

When you learn how to weave, you also improve many other skills, like self-control, patience, tenacity, making decisions and develop your thinking. One important aspect of Navajo weaving is called the spirit line. This spirit line connects the inside of the rug to the outside enabling the weaver to spiritually move on to the next weaving.

== Career ==
Her artistic style combined the traditional elements with the more spiritual aspects of life. Her technique was shown in the way she choose the materials and colors going into her rug. Henderson Nez believed that when one had a design in mind and everything was planned, they knew exactly what they wanted to use. She also believed when one was dedicated, independent and hardworking is when they can be great at weaving. Henderson Nez was also a basket weaver, from this her preference for stepped designs developed. She became a part of a small group of women who wove ceremonial baskets. One of the old-style weaving designs she did that was inspired by the ceremonial baskets is still on display at the Hubbell Trading Post.

When Henderson Nez was making rugs they all made Navajo names until later when they started naming them in English. Two styles, in particular, Old styles from the 19th century and Ganado style were the styles she was known for. For the rug to be Ganado style, there must be one diamond in the center or two interlocking diamonds. Deep red, black, gray, white, and every once in a while brown were the only colors that could be used in this style. Henderson Nez's rugs became famous because of her extreme attention to detail with her vivid geometric designs. More than 150 years ago, Navajo women wove a shoulder blanket, Henderson Nez reproduced this design. There were specific colors in this style that represented certain elements. Black represents darkness, white shows the spiritual side, and red symbolizes the earth. Colors have certain meanings in designs but the loom itself also holds some symbolism. The loom as a whole represents life, the wood the loom is made from represents the earth. The vertically strung warp threads symbolize rainfall and each rug is given a heartbeat by the waft beating into the warp.

== Artworks ==
=== Woman's Chief-Blanket Style Rug (1988) ===
These types of blankets were only for people of status or the wealthy due to the fact that the weaver would use finer textiles. The main commonality between these blankets was the color red.

- The length of the blanket had three red bands and two bands of eleven black and white stripes. The red bands had dark blue crosses, the bands themselves were separated by the bands of black and white stripes.
- Of the three red bands, the top and bottom bands had three dark blue crosses with tiny black rectangles at each point of the crosses. One cross had a total of eight black rectangles. The stripes separating each cross were different, on the top band the stripes were red and black, on the bottom the stripes were black and white. The black and white stripes meet the big black and white band.
- The center red band does not have any black or white in it, instead the dark blue crosses in this band are separated by narrow and wide dark blue stripes.

The point of this design was to leave the impression of a perfectly symmetrical but vibrate design.

=== Modified Ganado Chief Style Weaving (1988) ===
The rug is 72.5 inches by 46 inches, made of commercial wool only some of the wool is dyed that rest is natural wool. There are three red bands and two white and black bands.

- The top consists of six stripes of red and black with the purple stripe in the center. The red and black stripes are evenly distributed around the purple stripe. The bottom red band has seven stripes of red and black with a purple stripe in the center. So it goes red, black, red, purple, red, black, red, black. The middle red band has nineteen alternating stripes of red, black and purple.
- In between the red bands are alternating white and black stripes there are five stripes total with three white and two black.
- There are nine crosses on the rug. The crosses have three layers to them, the center is a red cross surrounded by a purple outline then there is a red outline. The first three crosses have their top point intersecting the first red band, then the other three points intersect the alternating bands of black and white. The bottom three crosses are the same as the first three. The middle three crosses have two points intersecting the red band and the tip of the top and bottom point are touching the white bands.

=== Ganado Wall Hanging (2004) ===
This a 24.5 inches by 24.5 inches rug made of dyed red and brown commercial wool.

- From bottom to top, there is one band of brown that connects to the red band above it with stepped pyramids. There is a total of eight pyramids connecting the layers. The red band consists of three stepped diamonds. Then there is a thick band of plain brown wool. After this band, the line of red with brown diamonds repeats, but now the stepped diamonds connecting the red layer and top brown layer are red.

The design of the rug is Ganado style, this specific design was inspired by the ceremonial baskets she produced with a small group of Navajo women.

== Hubbell Trading Post ==
Henderson Nez demonstrated her work at the Hubbell Trading Post in the 1970s. Her daughter Mary Lee Begay also demonstrated weaving at the post.

These trading posts were places where Navajo weaving developed and the weavers could get payment for their works. Today, this trading post as well as others, are tourist attractions. The Hubbell Trading Post is located in Ganado, Arizona. Juan Lorenzo Hubbell purchased the trading post in 1878, then it was run by the Hubbell family until 1967. In 1967, the trading post was deemed a National Historic Site and purchased by the National Park Service. Hubbell Trading Post was home to the Hubbell family, their home is now an archive that holds a collection of Navajo weavings. There are 13 Navajo weavers whose works are on display there, including Henderson Nez.

== Exhibitions ==
- 1994 Museum of Northern Arizona in Flagstaff
- Hubbell Trading Post (1970s-present)

== Collections ==
- Southwest Native American Collection at the Kennedy Museum of Art, Ohio University
- Museum of Northern Arizona in Flagstaff
- Denver Art Museum in Denver, Colorado
- Desert Caballeros Western Museum in Wickenburg Arizona

== Awards and honors ==
- In 2002, she was awarded the Lifetime Achievement Award from the Museum of Indian Arts and Crafts in Santa Fe.
- In 2005, she received the Lifetime Honor of a National Endowment for the Arts National Heritage Fellowship. In folk and traditional art forms, this is the highest honor the artist can receive in the United States.

== See also ==
- Navajo weaving
- Hubbell Trading Post National Historic Site
