= Eliseo Rodriguez =

New Mexico artist

Eliseo J. Rodriguez
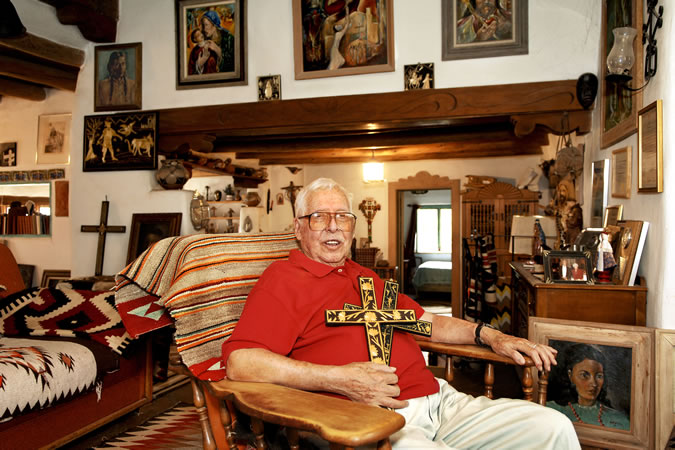
- Rodriguez in 2004
- Born: September 21, 1915; Santa Fe, New Mexico
- Died: April 3, 2009 (aged 93); Santa Fe, New Mexico
- Resting place: Santa Fe National Cemetery
- Known for: straw appliqué, painting
- Spouse: Paula Rodriguez
- Awards: National Heritage Fellowship Award; New Mexico Governor's Award for Excellence in the Arts
- Patrons: T. T. Flynn
- Memorials: 107 W Palace Ave Santa Fe, New Mexico 87501

Eliseo Rodriguez (1915–2009) was a New Mexico artist known for his straw appliqué and oil paintings.

== Early life ==
Rodriguez was born in Santa Fe, New Mexico in 1915, exposed to the artists on Canyon Road. As a boy he worked odds jobs for the Cinco Pintores, the five young painters who formed the state's first modernist-leaning artist collective.

== Career ==
Rodriguez's career began when writer T. T. Flynn funded a scholarship for him to enroll in the Santa Fe Art School as the first and only Hispano painting student. In 1936, Rodriguez found work through the federally funded programs known as the Works Progress Administration. He was one of several artists to paint murals for the Texas Centennial. Regional director Russell Vernon Hunter encouraged Rodriguez to revive the Spanish colonial art technique known as "straw appliqué". To this day, art historians credit him for reviving the form and his works are highly sought after by museums and private collectors. Together with his wife Paula, he was the first to exhibit straw appliqué works at Santa Fe's annual Spanish Market. In 1940 he won a prize at the New Mexico State Fair for his painting on glass. In 2001 Rodriguez finally got a solo exhibition, Eliseo Rodriguez : el sexto pintor, held at the New Mexico Museum of Art. Eliseo created the bronze plaques that are set in the sidewalk in front of the Fine Art Museum in Santa Fe, at a corner of the Plaza, and he is included along with the Cinco Pintores and other master painters.

Rodriguez's works are in the public collections of the Albuquerque Museum, Millicent Rogers Museum, Folk Art Museum (Berlin, Germany), Museum of Spanish Colonial Art, Museum of International Folk Art, American Museum in Britain, Smithsonian Museum of American History, and the Colorado Springs Fine Arts Center.

Rodriguez died at home on April 3, 2009. Paula, his wife of 74 years, preceded him in death by about four months. He is buried in the Santa Fe National Cemetery for his service in the US Army during World War II.

== Awards and honors ==
- 1980: Rodriguez was honored with a New Mexico Governor's Award for Excellence in the Arts
- 1985: he was one of a select few artists honored by the city with a plaque on West Palace Avenue in Santa Fe

=== Joint awards and honors with Paula ===
- 1989: Master's Award for Lifetime Achievement from the Spanish Market
- 1998: Santa Fe Living Treasure awards
- 1999: Mayor's Award for Excellence in the Arts
- 2004: joint National Heritage Fellowship awarded by the National Endowment for the Arts, which is the United States government's highest honor in the folk and traditional arts
