= Bertha Cook =

American needlework artist (1895–1990)

- Born: Bertha Hodges; March 29, 1895; Sands, Watauga County, North Carolina, U.S.
- Died: March 9, 1990 (aged 94)
- Known for: Needlework
- Awards: National Heritage Fellowship, 1984

Bertha Hodges Cook (March 29, 1895 – March 9, 1990) was an American handicraft artist who was known primarily for her needlework using Colonial knotting and fringing techniques to make bedspreads.

Cook was a recipient of a 1984 National Heritage Fellowship awarded by the National Endowment for the Arts, which is the highest honor in the folk and traditional arts in the United States.

== Early life ==
Bertha Hodges was born in the Blue Ridge Mountain community of Sands, North Carolina, near Boone. Her mother was Carrie Hodges, a well-regarded bedspread artist who had learned the skill from her English and Irish female ancestors. Both women used as patterns bedspreads over 100 years old that had been passed down and carefully preserved from one generation to the next. As a child, Cook accompanied her mother to Southern Highland Craft Guild fairs, where she learned about Colonial knotting and fringing techniques to make bedspreads and pillows. Her mother and grandmother served as mentors when Cook began to work on her own.

== Career ==
Cook began making the knotted designs at an early age, but she initially feared learning the complex tying process that resulted in the bedspread's fringe. At age 16, she married Daniel Webster Cook, and they had two children by the time she was 18 years old. Needing money to help support her growing family, and with the strong encouragement of her mother, Cook learned how to tie the fringe so that she could complete each work. She quickly became very proficient as an artisan, and at the height of her career she would make one bedspread a week.

The Cooks eventually had six children, and as soon as the children were old enough, she taught them to knot and tie so they could help her with the work. Over the years, Cook made more than a thousand bedspreads, as well as pillows and shams, curtains, table runners and table cloths. The money she made selling her bedspreads and other finished pieces substantially contributed to the family finances, and helped pay for automobiles, a new refrigerator, and a replacement well on the family property.

The patterns passed along within her family included Bird in the Tree, Rose of Sharon, Bowknot and Thistle, Napoleon Wreath, and Sunflower. Cook's personal contribution to the family repertoire was called the Grape Wreath or Grapevine, which became her specialty. She would improvise the leaf shapes as she worked, noting that in nature no two leaves are identical, but she never veered very far from her family traditions.

Cook's work was recognized in the Appalachian region for her "exceptional skill and artistry". She joined the Southern Highland Handicraft Guild in 1951. For several decades, she traveled to fairs and art shows to demonstrate and sell her work.

=== Technique ===
Her technique has been described as follows:

Cook made her knotted bedspreads with large sheets of unbleached or whitened muslin decorated with patterns formed by small knots and, sometimes, other embroidery stiches with white thread. Twine fringe tied to intricate patterns trimmed the spread. To start a new spread, Cook placed a muslin sheet over an older spread. Using a rag and bluing solution, she marked the raised areas on the new sheeting produced by the lines of knots on the old spread underneath. Gradually, a pattern of bluing dots begins to resemble the bottom spread's pattern on the muslin sheet. These dots become the pattern for the new spread. Cook then began knotting over the dots, using multiple plies of cotton thread that she twisted together in bundles. For her Grape Wreath spread, for example, she passed 12 plies through a large needle and primed the strands with beeswax to hold them together. She then pushed the needle and thread into the muslin, twisted the needle once, and pulled it back out to form what her mother called "Colonial" knots. This method produced tight, neat knots that stand up on the bedspread. After the knotted pattern is completed the bluing is washed out.

The final stage involves trimming the bedspread with rows of loops that form a fringe. Cook used a shuttle to form tied loops, making 100 to a yard. She utilized dowels of different sizes to make a different size loop for each row. She then tied each row to the previous one, forming tiers of lace to be sewn into the bedspread's edge. The rows of fringe were tied on a wooden frame her husband built for her. She affixed the loops to the spread using a briar stitch her mother taught her. This stitch gave the appearance that the fringe was tied through the hem rather than stitched on.

== Legacy ==
One of Cook's knotted bedspreads is included in the permanent collection of the Southern Highland Craft Guild. Her work was also included in the same organization's 2020 special exhibit titled "The Power of Distinction".

Photographs of her work are also included in the "Knotted Bedspread Collection" 1970–1974, created by scholar Thomas A. McGowan and housed by the Special Collections Research Center at Appalachian State University.

Cook's children became skilled artists as well, and carried on the tradition into their adulthoods. Cook also taught North Carolina artist Carmelee Craig the colonial knotting techniques that she had learned from her female relatives.

== Awards and honors ==
- 1952: Southern Highland Handicraft Guild, Excellence of Design Award
- 1967: North Carolina State Fair, invited artist
- 1973: North Carolina Folklore Society, Brown-Hudson Folklore Award
- 1973: Southern Highland Handicraft Guild's Lifetime membership award
- 1984: National Endowment for the Arts, National Heritage Fellowship
