= Alice Blue Legs =

Lakota quillworker

- 1985, Alice Blue Legs by H. Jane Nauman
- Born: Rosaline Alice New Holy; July 26, 1925; Pine Ridge Indian Reservation, Grass Creek, Shannon County, South Dakota
- Died: January 2, 2003 (aged 77); Rapid City, South Dakota
- Other name: Alice New Holy Blue Legs
- Occupation: craftsperson
- Known for: quillwork

Alice Blue Legs (July 26, 1925 – January 2, 2003) was a Lakota Sioux craftworker, notable for her quillwork. She received a 1985 National Heritage Fellowship from the National Endowment for the Arts and was a featured artist for the documentary film Lakota Quillwork—Art and Legend. Her work was seen in the epic film Dances with Wolves and exhibited in museums such as The Children's Museum of Indianapolis, the Heard Museum, the Sioux Indian Museum. Examples of her work are in the permanent collection of the Indian Arts and Crafts Board at the Washington, D. C. headquarters of the United States Department of the Interior and the Smithsonian's National Museum of the American Indian.

== Early life ==
Rosaline Alice New Holy was born on July 26, 1925 (Note: Several sources give her birth date as July 25, but the registration of her birth in the Office of Indian Affairs shows July 26.) on the Pine Ridge Indian Reservation, near Grass Creek, in Shannon County, South Dakota to Julia (née Kills at Lodge) and Joseph New Holy. After her mother's death in 1937, (Note: On the 1930 census Alice's name appears to have been erroneously recorded as Laura, as in the 1940 census, the same aged daughter is styled as Alice.) she was raised by her father, his second wife, and her grandmother. She attended the Oglala Community School, graduating after completing high school.

== Career ==
New Holy remembered her mother and grandmother, Quiver, doing decorations and medallion work when she was small and she learned some techniques from her grandmother, but both had died when she wanted to learn the craft. Her father encouraged her to learn the traditional quillwork skills of the Lakota and though he encouraged her, he would not touch the quills as they were women's objects. He showed her samples in magazines of various designs and through trial and error New Holy taught herself the craft.

To make designs, quills were collected, boiled, and then dyed bright colors, before they are dried. There are three basic types of techniques then used in decoration, but only two were traditionally women's handiwork. For fringes and jewelry, quills were softened and flattened, typically by chewing as soaking them causes an alkaline reaction making them brittle. They were then wound around strips of buckskin. In the stitching technique, quills were woven through flat fabrics and the third method, which New Holy rarely used as it was typically for men's objects like pipe stems and tampers, was to braid the quills. Her motifs replicated geometric and free-flowing designs found among Lakota artists who had quilled in the past.

By the time she married Amil Blue Legs, New Holy was an accomplished quiller. His family was known for trapping and hunting porcupines, and she taught Amil how to quill. Subsequently, the couple had five daughters, all of whom she taught quilling. The couple lived in a log home, hand-hewn by Amil and covered with a sod roof near her family's traditional home at Grass Creek. They earned income by producing crafts and garments, including dresses; regalia such as armbands or breastplates; and jewelry, among other items. Concerned that the skill would be lost, Blue Legs taught native craftspeople and offered workshops at various venues, including Brown University, Buffalo Bill Historical Center, The Children's Museum of Indianapolis, Dartmouth College, and The University of South Dakota, as well as other places.

Blue Legs also exhibited at major museums known for featuring Native American artwork, including the Heard Museum in Phoenix, Arizona, the Sioux Indian Museum of Rapid City, South Dakota, and the Southern Plains Indian Museum in Anadarko, Oklahoma. Her work was also included in a special exhibit hosted in 1977 at the Nelson-Atkins Museum of Art, Sacred Circles: 2000 Years of North American Art, which brought together 850 artifacts from 90 museums and private collections in six countries, including objects from the British Museum. In 1985, she was honored by the National Endowment for the Arts with the highest honor it bestows upon craft workers, a National Heritage Fellowship for her effort in preserving the traditional craft.

That same year, the Blue Leg and New Holy families were the subjects of a documentary film, Lakota Quillwork—Art and Legend, produced by H. Jane Nauman. The first half of the film showed women working with quills and the second half demonstrated the way of life of Blue Legs, her husband, and daughters, depicting how their contemporary life revolved around hunting, preparing, and working with quills. She was also one of the artists featured in the Sioux Indian Museum's celebrations for the South Dakota Centennial in 1987. Her work was included in the epic film Dances with Wolves in 1990 and in 1993, Blue Legs was selected as one of the co-chairs and featured artists for the Dakota Arts Congress. The documentary featuring her work, won the 1985 National Heritage Master Award and was broadcast by the Sheldon Jackson Museum in Sitka, Alaska in 2002.

== Death and legacy ==
Blue Legs died on January 2, 2003, at Rapid City Regional Hospital in Rapid City, South Dakota and was buried in her family cemetery in Grass Creek. She has works in the permanent collections of the Indian Arts and Crafts Board, housed in Washington, D. C. at the headquarters of the United States Department of the Interior and the Smithsonian's National Museum of the American Indian.
