= Nadjeschda Overgaard =

American needleworker

Nadjeschda Overgaard (born Nadjeschda Lynge) (1905 – 2003) was an American needleworker who received a National Heritage Fellowship from the National Endowment of the Arts for her lifetime of work in 1998.

== Life ==
Born to Danish dairy producers working temporarily in Tara, Siberia, she returned to Denmark when she was five years old and the Russian Revolution broke out. She emigrated to Elk Horn, Iowa with her family when she was 10. She worked as a teacher and married a Dane, Niels Overgaard, in 1933. She had learned embroidery in the traditional styles such as the Hardanger embroidery. She also took on a role as a teacher of traditional Danish culture, including paper cutting, cooking and singing, within the Danish-American community in Elk Horn and Kimballton. Her work has been exhibited in several exhibitions of Iowa folk art, and is included in the collection of the State Historical Society of Iowa and at the Museum of Danish America in Elk Horn.
