= Hystercine Rankin =

African-American textile artist (1929–2010)

- Born: Hystercine Gray; September 11, 1929; Jefferson County, Mississippi, US
- Died: February 10, 2010 (aged 80); Vicksburg, Mississippi, US
- Spouse: Ezekiel Rankin Sr. (1945–)
- Children: 7

Hystercine Rankin (September 11, 1929 – February 10, 2010) was an African-American quilter from Mississippi. Several of her quilts are held in the permanent collections of the American Folk Art Museum, the Mississippi Museum of Art, the Mississippi Department of Archives and History, and the San Jose Museum of Quilts and Textiles.

== Early life ==
Hystercine Gray was born on a farm in Jefferson County, Mississippi; she was the third child of her parents. Her mother, Laula, taught at a one-room schoolhouse for four to five months each year, while her father, Denver Gray, was a sharecropper who raised cotton, corn, and smaller garden crops for his family. The two had married on Christmas Day, 1925; Laula was 19 at the time. In 1939, Hystercine's father was shot and killed on a highway by a white man for unknown reasons. Following his burial, Laula, Hystercine, and her siblings (sources differ on whether she had seven or ten) moved in with Laula's mother, Alice Whelman.

Hystercine Gray married her husband, Ezekiel Rankin, in 1945, at age 16. Ezekiel had recently returned from serving in the army during World War II. By this time her mother had also died, and she found herself responsible for raising her younger siblings. Rankin and her husband also went on to have seven children of their own. The couple farmed, and Rankin canned the crops they raised.

== Art career ==
When Rankin turned 12, her grandmother, Alice Whelman, began teaching her how to quilt. Rankin primarily worked on bed covers, a practical item considering the size of her family. She learned styles such as flower garden, nine patch, star quilt, and string quilt. She continued to quilt once she married and began having her own children, and had a tradition of giving each of her children a quilt when they left home to start their own families. Throughout this time, Rankin did not think of herself as an artist.

In 1981, the Port Gibson-based art agency Mississippi Cultural Crossroads (MCC) invited her to participate as a folk artist in the Artist Residency in the Schools program, which was funded by the Mississippi Arts Commission (MAC). During her two-week residency at the junior high school in Lorman, Mississippi, she came to realize the artistic dimensions of her work and the work of her grandmother and other quilters in her community. The following year, several of Rankin's quilts were purchased by Camille Crosby, who continued to purchase from Rankin through the 1990s.

Rankin began working with Mississippi Cultural Crossroads to take orders for quilts, and she put the money she made towards her children's college tuition; all seven children eventually graduated from Alcorn State University. MCC also helped Rankin apply for a Folk Arts Apprenticeship grant from MAC. She was successfully in receiving the grant, which paid her $2,000 to teach a group of six apprentices.

Rankin continued to work with MCC, and in 1988 was made their master quilter. She helped found and do teaching for Crossroads Quilters, a loose collective of women quilters who displayed their work through MCC. Crossroad Quilters began organizing an annual quilt contest and show, called “Pieces and Strings"; in the first ten years of the show, Rankin won 13 first-place awards in various categories. Several of Rankin's works were displayed in the Mississippi Museum of Art, as they agreed to showcase each year's winning entries.

In 1992, MCC hosted a solo exhibit of her work, entitled "Visions and Dreams: A One Woman Show".

In 1996, she served as a demonstrator at the Festival of American Folklife in Washington D.C.

== Works ==
Rankin's early work was utilitarian, using scraps of old cloth which were then pieced into strips and joined to fit the size of whatever bed needed a quilt. In some cases, she used the cloth that was leftover from making or tailoring clothing for her family.

Rankin also made "memory quilts", quilts which depict scenes from the lives of Rankin and her family. She also utilized applique and embroidery when making these quilts. It took Rankin three to four weeks to make the squares for these quilts, and two weeks to piece the squares together.

Besides history, Rankin also drew inspiration from dreams, from which she created her Rainbow pattern quilts, and nature, which inspired her Sunburst quilts. Rankin also used her works to explore Black life in the South; in one quilt, titled Parchman Prison, she used a variation of the Sunburst pattern to depict an abstracted design of a prison.

== Recognition ==
In 1991, Rankin received the Susan B. Herron Fellowship, Mississippi's highest arts award.

In 1993, Rankin won the Southern Arts Federation/NEA Regional Visual Arts Fellowship.

In 1997, Rankin received a National Heritage Fellowship from the National Endowment for the Arts.

In 2007, Rankin was included in an episode of PBS's Craft in America.
