= Esther Littlefield =

Native American artist from Alaska (1906–1997)

- Aan-woogeex'
- Esther Littlefield, from a 1982 newspaper
- Born: Esther Edith Kasakan; April 29, 1906; Killisnoo, Alaska
- Died: June 17, 1997 (91 years); Sitka, Alaska
- Other name: Esther Simpson
- Citizenship: Sitka Tribe of Alaska and U.S.
- Occupation: Artist

Esther Kasakan Littlefield (Russian: Эсфирь Эди́та Касакан; April 29, 1906 – June 17, 1997), also called Aan-woogeex', was a Tlingit artist who made blankets and ceremonial regalia including button blankets. She was awarded the National Heritage Fellowship in 1991.

== Early life ==
Esther Edith Kasakan was born in Killisnoo near Sitka, the daughter of James Kasakan and Lena Marie Daniel. She was a member of the Kiksadi, a Tlingit clan.

== Career ==
Littlefield made hats, blankets, and robes for Tlingit ceremonial uses; her works used traditional emblems to represent people and events, and they served as an aid for storytelling. She worked at the Sitka National Historical Park, teaching handicraft classes at the Southeast Alaska Indian Cultural Center, beginning in 1969. She received an award from the National Park Service in 1983, and the Alaska Governor's Award for the Arts in 1984. In 1984, she was one of the featured Alaskan artists at the Smithsonian Folklife Festival in Washington, D.C. In 1986, Sheldon Jackson College presented her with their annual Christian Citizenship Award.

In 1991, Littlefield was awarded the National Heritage Fellowship from the National Endowment for the Arts. "Artists such as Esther Littlefield are our living national treasures," said John Frohnmayer of the NEA. "They are the keepers of seasoned and mature artistic traditions that speak to us across hundreds of years and thousands of miles."

== Personal life ==
Esther Kasakan married twice; her first husband was Louis Simpson Sr.; they had four children together, and he died before 1940. Her second husband was Charles Livingston Littlefield; they had five children together, and he died in 1989. Beyond her own nine children, she helped to raise several nieces and nephews, including Leonard K. Shotridge. Esther Littlefield died in 1997, aged 91 years, in Sitka.
