= Francis Palani Sinenci =

Hawaiian artisan

Francis Palani Sinenci (born 1942) is a recognized master-builder of traditional Hawaiian house (hale) building methods. Most know him as either "Uncle Palani" or "Uncle Francis". Sinenci is of both Kanaka Maoli (Native Hawaiian) and Filipino descent and he was born and raised in Hāna, Maui. He holds the title of "kuhikuhi puʻuone", which is the highest title one can receive in traditional Hawaiian architecture which also includes the mastery of stonework.

In addition to hale building, Sinenci is known for heiau restoration and fishpond restoration. Sinenci began this cultural resurgence journey in the early 1990s.

== Early life ==
Sinenci was born to a Native Hawaiian mother and Filipino immigrant father in 1942. He is the second oldest of 9 siblings and spent his childhood in Hāna, Maui. Sinenci enjoyed fishing and his family primarily gathered and traded their daily food. He attended and graduated from Hāna Elementary to High School, class of 1961, and throughout high school, he joined the Civil Air Patrol as a way to occasionally travel out of the small town of Hāna.

== Projects and awards ==
=== Hale Building ===
- In March 1996, Sinenci completed his first hale building project on the island of Maui by creating a Kauhale at the Hāna Cultural Center and Museum.
- In April 2011, Sinenci completed a year long project building Hale Mohala at Mohala Farms.
- In 2018, Sinenci won the People's Choice Award from the American Institute of Architects (AIA) Film Challenge for a film titled Ka Hale: A Revival. This project was a short documentary on Sinenci by filmmaker MarQ Morrison.
- In a PBS Hawaii episode aired in 2019, it was acknowledged that over 300 hale building projects were built by Sinenci.

=== Heiau ===
- Sinenci led the restoration of Piʻilani Hale located at Kahanu Gardens in Hāna, Maui which was completed in April 1999. Piʻilani Hale is the largest heiau in Maui, and some claim the largest in all of Polynesia.

=== Awards ===
- In 2016, Sinenci and his wife Esse were co-recipients of the Hana's Malaikini Public Service Award. His certificate reads:
  - "For his outstanding leadership in the Hana community and the wider Pacific in perpetuating traditions of Hale building, Heiau rehabilitation, and Fishpond restoration and in passing this knowledge on to future generations, the people of Hana gratefully acknowledge and honor Sinenci as the co-recipient of the 2016 Tiny Malaikini Mea Kokua Award."
- He is a recipient of a 2022 National Heritage Fellowship awarded by the National Endowment for the Arts, which is the United States government's highest honor in the folk and traditional arts.
