= Eva Enciñias =

American flamenco dancer and choreographer

Eva Enciñias is an American flamenco dancer, choreographer, and teacher.

Eva began teaching flamenco at the age of 14 and in 1973 established a touring dance company, Ritmo Flamenco. In 1976 she started teaching Flamenco at the University of New Mexico Department of Theatre and Dance, eventually establishing a flamenco concentration, the only such concentration in the United States. In 1987 she founded the first Festival Flamenco Internacional de Alburquerque, a festival which has continued into the present. In 1992 she founded the National Institute of Flamenco, and in 2010 founded the Tierra Adentro charter school in Albuquerque, NM, focused on the arts and culture of New Mexico.

Enciñias also produced and directed dance performances with her company, Ritmo Flamenco, during the 1970s and 1980. In 2010 she was inducted into the Albuquerque Wall of Fame, and in 2022 was awarded a NEA National Heritage Fellowship.
