= Mealiʻi Kalama =

Quilter (b. 1909, d. 2004)

Meali'i Kalama
- Born: January 3rd, 1909; Honolulu, Hawaii
- Died: August 22nd, 2004
- Education: University of Hawaiʻi
- Awards: National Heritage Fellowship

Mariah Meali'i Namahoe Lucas (Richardson) Kalama (Jan 3, 1909 — Aug 22, 2004) was a Native Hawaiian quilter who was awarded the National Heritage Fellowship. She is known for popularizing Hawaiian quilting, and is well known in the Hawaiian quilting community. Kalama was also an ordained lay pastor under Kahu Dr. Abraham Akaka of Kawaiahaʻo Church - Westminster Abbey of the Pacific.

== Early life ==
Kalama was born on January 3, 1909, in Honolulu, Hawaii. During her youth, she often watched her grandmother and mother work on their latest quilting project. It was during her childhood that her interest in quilting began to grow. In her teenage years, she expressed her interest in quilting and, following, she spent a year and a half completing her first quilt with a design based on the ulu or breadfruit tree. Kalama pursued her education through attending the University of Hawaiʻi for two years.

== Career ==
=== Education ===
In 1943, Kalama began teaching in the public schools. At this time, she also taught quilting for the Department of Parks and Recreation. In 1950, Kalama left her job to become the first director of a newly opened playground and recreation center. It was said that "she could teach kids how to sew, quilt, [or] anything." Until her retirement in 1975, she was the Park Director and also taught at "Papakōlea Playground" (known today as Papakōlea Community Center) and at other parks, and was a lay minister under Kahu Abraham Akaka at Kawaiahao Church.

=== Quilting ===
Kalama was a quilter throughout her lifetime. She created many of her own designs, which were influenced by the style of traditional Hawaiian quilts. Kalama's quilts were also inspired by nature and said herself that "all designs must show that flowing gracefulness of nature". Kalama was also known for using a creative color palette in her designs. At one point in her life, Laurance S. Rockefeller, founder of the Mauna Kea Beach Hotel, commissioned Kalama to create 30 Hawaiian quilts. These quilts took Kalama and other women over 30,000 hours to stitch and were hung in the hotel's corridors where they still reside. Kalama also made a quilt for Queen Liliuokalani's bed, whose home eventually became the governor's mansion.

=== Legacy and awards ===
Kalama is recognized for popularizing Hawaiian quilting, after what was considered to be a long period of disinterest. Many of her quilts have been collected and exhibited by the Museum of International Folk Art and she also has a quilt being held in the Smithsonian Institution.

In 1980, the YMCA recognized Kalama "for being responsible for the revival of Hawaiian quilting". In 1985, Kalama became the first Hawaiian to receive a National Heritage Fellowship from the National Endowment for the Arts.
