= Stanley Hicks =

American folk artist, instrument maker, and storyteller

Stanley Hicks (1911–1989) was an American folk artist from Watauga County, North Carolina. Hicks was known for his musical instrument building, particularly banjos and dulcimers, and for his woodwork, work as a musician, dancer and storyteller.

Hicks has been recognized as a "National Historic Artist" by the Blue Ridge National Heritage Area of the US National Park Service. He was a recipient of a 1983 National Heritage Fellowship awarded by the National Endowment for the Arts, which is the United States government's highest honor in the folk and traditional arts.

In the early 1980s Hicks was filmed by UNC-TV for the "Music From The Hills" episode of the Folkways series. The original camera tapes from these interviews have been digitized and are being preserved by UNC-TV.
