= Ofelia Esparza =

Chicana altarista (altar-maker), artist, and educator

Ofelia Esparza (born 1932) is a Chicana altar installation artist and educator in East Los Angeles, California.

== Biography ==
Esparza was born on March 12, 1932, in East Los Angeles, California. She is a sixth-generation Chicana. The Esparza family is from Huanímaro, Guanajuato, Mexico. Married for forty years, she raised nine children and one child elected to be an altarista apprentice. In 1974, she earned a Bachelor of Arts degree in Liberal Studies and an Honorary Doctorate in Human Letters in 2016 from California State University, Los Angeles. In 1999, after three decades of teaching, she retired from City Terrace Elementary School.

=== Art ===
Esparza is an altarista (altar maker) recognized for her community ofrendas or altar installations created for Dia de Muertos at Self Help Graphics & Arts (SHG) in East Los Angeles. Esparza's work is influenced by her mother's dedication to preserving altarista traditions, encompassing ofrendas, nacimientos (nativity scenes), and altars venerating Tonantzin (Our Lady of Guadalupe). Her work has been showcased in national and international venues such as The Latino Museum of History, Art and Culture in Los Angeles; the Los Angeles County Museum of Art in Los Angeles; the Mexican Museum in San Francisco; the Mexican Fine Art Museum of Chicago in Chicago; Centro Cultural de Tijuana in Tijuana Mexico; and the Glasgow Print Studio in Scotland.

In 1979, Esparza and other Chicanx artists established the annual Día de los Muertos community celebration at Self Help Graphics & Art in East Los Angeles.

In 2017, Esparza and her daughter Rossana were culture consultants for Disney Films, in the film Coco. Among many other projects, the Esparza mother/daughter collaboration manage the gallery Tonalli Studio in Boyle Heights.

In 2018, Esparza was awarded the National Heritage Fellowship by the National Endowment for the Arts.

Altar to el Pueblo de Nuestra Señora la Reina de los Ángeles (the Town of Our Lady the Queen of Angels)

Ofelia Esparza and her daughter, Rosanna Esparza, were commissioned to create a permanent altar at the Los Angeles Museum of Natural History in 2018. This altar was part of an enhanced reboot of the exhibition called “Becoming Los Angeles.” This article closely explains one of her most known artworks, Altar to el Pueblo de Nuestra Señora la Reina de los Ángeles (the Town of Our Lady the Queen of Angels). This piece references historical moments and geographical places of Los Angeles. Originally set up in 2013, the permanent exhibition, "Altar to el Pueblo de Nuestra Señora la Reina de los Ángeles" (the Town of Our Lady the Queen of Angels), incorporates historical events, geographical locales, and a diverse array of Angeleno perspectives within the city. It also features representations of flowers and animals native to greater L.A., often symbolically depicted through miniature and meticulously hand-painted architectural replicas.

2016 Dia de los Muertos Community Altar at Grand Park designed by Ofelia Esparza

Grand Park celebrates Dia de los Muertos yearly with an art installation and maintains its artistic collaboration with Self Help Graphics (SHG), overseeing multiple expansive altar installations crafted by artists and community partner organizations. This collection includes the yearly Community Altar, expertly crafted by Ofelia Esparza.

Raices Cosmicas (Cosmic Roots), 2018, Mixed media, dimensions 204 × 72 × 108

In past interviews, Esparza has gone in depth of what it takes to build an altar. Esparza explains how to configure the space and any restrictions or constraints of space and regulations of the venue. She discusses collecting materials, artifacts, or memorabilia, and determining colors of fabrics, walls, etc, in which all come into play in order to begin construction. Usually, there are purchases of materials and supplies to be made for each altar.

Ofelia Esparza: A Retrospective

From October 18, 2025, to May 16, 2026, The Vincent Price Art Museum at East Los Angeles College presented an exhibition surveying Esparza's career from the 1950s onward. Organized by the. museum and curated by Joseph Valencia and Sybil Venegas with Gloria Ortega, the exhibition included recreations of selected altar installations as well as drawings, paintings, prints, archival materials, and other works.
