= Lila Greengrass Blackdeer =

American basketmaker (1932–2021)

- Mąšųhijąjąwįga
- Lila Greengrass Blackdeer, from a 1965 newspaper
- Born: Lila Greengrass; February 14, 1932; Black River Falls, Wisconsin
- Died: October 30, 2021 (aged 89)
- Occupations: Artist, basketmaker
- Spouse: William P. Blackdeer (m. 1954)
- Children: 4

Lila Greengrass Blackdeer (February 14, 1932 – October 30, 2021), also known as Mąšųhijąjąwįga, was an American maker of black ash baskets, in the Ho-Chunk tradition. She was awarded a National Heritage Fellowship in 1999.

== Early life ==
Lila Greengrass was born in Black River Falls, Wisconsin, the daughter of Edwin Greengrass and Bessie Youngbear. Her father attended Carlisle Indian Industrial School from 1913 to 1917. She began making baskets as a child, instructed by her mother in the techniques of their Ho-Chunk (or Winnebago) tradition.

== Career ==
Blackdeer taught basketmaking and other crafts for much of her life, including 24 years at Western Wisconsin Technical College. She was also manager of Winnebago Indian Mission Industries, a garment factory run by women in her community, on the site of an old mission school. In addition to basketry, Blackdeer was skilled in sewing, dyeing, needlework, and beadwork. She was awarded a National Heritage Fellowship by the National Endowment for the Arts in 1999. She was one of the elder-artists included in an exhibition and documentation project by the Hocak Wazijaci Language and Culture Preservation Committee in 1994. Works by Blackdeer are in the collections of the Milwaukee Public Museum, Marquette University, and the University of Wisconsin, and many private collections. Her baskets were part of an exhibit at Edgewood College in 2017.

== Personal life ==
Lila Greengrass married William P. Blackdeer in 1954. They had four children. Her husband died in 2001. She died in 2021, aged 89 years.
