= Janie Hunter =

American singer and storyteller (1918–1997)

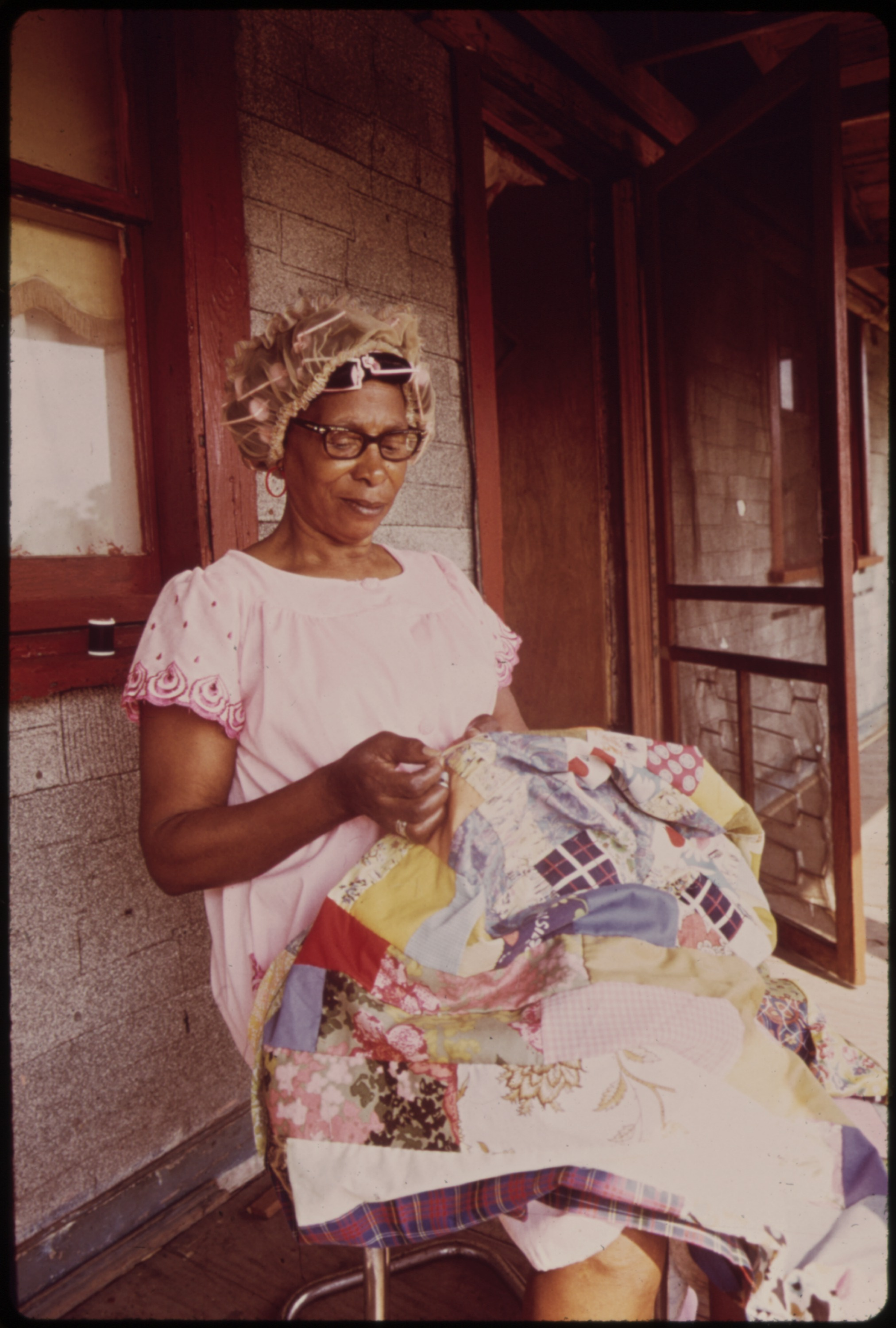
Hunter in 1970

Janie Hunter (June 7, 1918 – June 14, 1997) was an American singer and storyteller who worked to preserve Gullah culture and folkways in her home of Johns Island, South Carolina. She received a 1984 National Endowment for the Arts National Heritage Fellowship in recognition of her contributions to folk art and traditions.

== Early life ==
Janie Bligen Hunter was born on River Road on Johns Island, South Carolina in 1918. Her father was Joe Bligen, a fisher and farmer. When she was young, Hunter worked as a cotton picker, earning less than 40 cents a day for her work. She married Willie Hunter, with whom she had fourteen children.

== Singing and storytelling ==
Hunter came from a large family of singers and storytellers, and she traced the lineage of these stories to ones handed down from her great-grandparents, who were enslaved in the Sea Islands. She and her brother Benjamin were some of the last native speakers of the Gullah language. She framed the use of the Gullah language among enslaved people as a form of resistance to oppression, a creation of private linguistic space that could not be understood by white slaveowners.

Hunter's stories often featured animals as characters, and had familiar songs woven into the telling. These tales were both a form of entertainment and a teaching tool used to pass on customs and cultural lessons to children. Many of the traditions she worked to preserve, whether in songs, stories, or crafts, showed the continuing influence of African cultural forms in the region as a result of slavery and the African Diaspora.

Hunter was a member of Wesley Methodist Church, and was known for her singing at Moving Star Hall, a local praise house. Moving Star Hall was a place of special importance to her as a singer, as she explained to musicologists Guy and Candie Carawan:

You can feel yourself in that hall. You have a chance to explain yourself ... anybody who want to. But in church on Sunday, we just have one preacher talk. And you might get a chance to raise a song or pick out one person to make a few remarks. But to that hall, everybody could have their way, tell your own story. That's the difference it makes.

Hunter toured as a song leader with the Moving Star Hall Singers for 30 years, beginning in 1964 with a performance at the Newport Folk Festival. She made recordings for three Smithsonian Folkways albums with the group: Sea Island Folk Festival: Moving Star Hall Singers and Alan Lomax (1964), Been in the Storm So Long: Spirituals & Shouts, Children's Game Songs, and Folktales (1967), and Johns Island, South Carolina: Its People and Songs (1973).

Hunter was well-regarded by academics and folklorists for her wide knowledge of Gullah customs and traditions, and was a frequent source in their research and preservation work. She was featured in Alan Lomax's documentary Dreams and Songs of the Noble Old (1991), which focused on her singing, storytelling, and efforts to pass on folk traditions to the younger generations. She was also featured in John Cohen's documentary Musical Holdouts (1975), performing the song "Sweet By and By."

Her storytelling has been published in the Carawans' Ain't You Got a Right to the Tree of Life (1967) and Talk That Talk: an Anthology of African-American Storytelling (1989).

== Honors ==
Hunter was recognized as an NEA National Heritage Fellow in 1984 for her singing. The fellowship cited her knowledge and teaching of storytelling, game songs, and folk medicine, as well as her skill in quilting and crafting of brooms and rag dolls. She traveled with a large group of family members to the National Heritage ceremony in Washington DC, and performed a ring shout as part of the Folklife Festival.

Hunter also received honors from the Smithsonian Institution and the National Association of Black Storytellers. She was a winner of the South Carolina Folk Heritage Award.

== Death ==
Janie Hunter died in Johns Island on June 14, 1997 of lung cancer. She was 78.
