= Charles M. Carrillo =

American artist

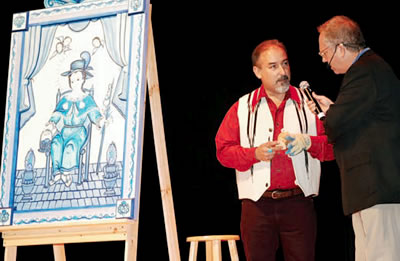
Carrillo (left) shows his work during the 2006 NEA National Heritage Fellows concert

Charles M. Carrillo (born 1956, Albuquerque, New Mexico) is an American artist, author, and archeologist known particularly for creating art using Spanish colonial techniques that reflect 18th-century Spanish New Mexico. Carrillo's works have shown throughout the United States and are a part of many permanent collections in American museums, including the Smithsonian American Art Museum, the Smithsonian Museum of American History in Washington, D.C., the Museum of International Folk Art in Santa Fe, and the Denver Museum of Art, among others.

Carrillo is the winner of numerous awards, including a 2006 National Heritage Fellowship bestowed upon him by the National Endowment for the Arts, which is the United States government's highest honor in the folk and traditional arts.
