= Georgia Harris =

Native American potter (1905–1997)

- Born: July 29, 1905; Lancaster County, South Carolina, U.S.
- Died: January 30, 1997 (aged 91); Dallas, Georgia, U.S.
- Citizenship: Catawba
- Occupation: Potter
- Honours: National Heritage Fellowship

Georgia Harris (July 29, 1905 – January 30, 1997) was known for preserving traditional forms of Catawba pottery. A member of the Catawba Tribe in South Carolina, Harris was a recipient of the National Heritage Fellowship for her work. Although ranging centuries, the earliest records of the Catawba pottery tradition that have been obtained date back to 1702. It was this rich history that Harris was responsible for preserving, including during a time period that ranged from the 1930s to the 1960s, when the tradition suffered due to demand. Beginning when she was 9 years old Harris took a keen interest in pottery, learning from both her mother and grandmother. As time passed, Harris found herself especially captivated by the pipe-making tradition, later passing down the art to many apprentices. Harris's legacy in Catawba pottery continues past her death.

== Early life ==
Harris was born on July 29, 1905, in Lancaster County; a Catawba reservation near Rock Hill, South Carolina. Harris's grandparents were both talented in craftwork. Her grandmother Martha Jane was known as one of the best Catawba potters of the nineteenth century, while her grandfather, Epp Harris, was an extraordinary pipe maker. Harris grew up watching her talented family members work at their craft and began to hone her skills based on what she witnessed. At the age of nine Harris formally began learning pottery techniques from her mother. Harris began by experimenting with clay by using the coil method, which entails rolling clay into long coils and then shaping the coils into a larger structure. Just as Catawba potters before her had done, Harris would then fire her pottery in a wood-burning open-pit fire. Despite its labor-intensive nature, Harris continued to use this technique for the rest of her life.

== Career ==
Throughout her career Harris strove to preserve traditional Catawba pottery practices. Rather than succumbing to the temptation of more tourist-friendly forms of creating her work, Harris ensured that she followed the instruction that she learned as a child. She was known for creating a variety of pottery, ranging from the ceremonial wedding jug to smoking pipes. Harris would gather clay from the riverbanks in South Carolina, craft it by hand, and then bake the pottery in a fire pit. Towards the end of her life, Harris began teaching the next generation of Catawba potters the traditional methods that she had used. By effectively instilling the importance of the ancient techniques into her understudies, as her ancestors had done for her, Harris ensured that traditional Catawba pottery would not go extinct after her death.

== Legacy ==
The Catawba Indian community has specialized in hand-built pottery for over four millennia, with one Catawba jar having been permanently placed in the White House Library. Over time this tradition has evolved to meet the needs of the Catawba community, therefore rendering it as a type of visual history of the nation's economic and social experiences. With the onset of The Great Depression, Catawba pottery suffered greatly due to the demand of cheaper, tourist-friendly goods. While this trend continued into the 1960s, Harris refused to compromise the level of her work, and eventually helped to usher in the revival of Catawba pottery that took place in the 1970s. By using a squeeze mold, Harris was specifically responsible for the resurgence of the pipe-making tradition within Catawba pottery. This also allowed her to introduce new shapes into the tradition, therefore allowing her to create new versions of classic pieces such as the snake pot, long-necked pitcher and wedding jug. For her entire life she lived in the Catawba community in South Carolina, perfecting her art and training future artisans as well. Harris continued her work even as she approached the age of 90 and persisted in her creation of new and innovative techniques which served to ensure the future of the tradition. She was a recipient of a 1997 National Heritage Fellowship awarded by the National Endowment for the Arts, which is the highest honor in the folk and traditional arts in the United States. Harris died in Dallas, Georgia on January 30, 1997.
