= Diomedes Matos =

American musician

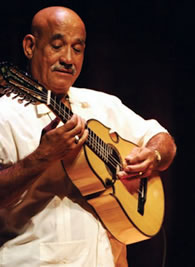
- Diomedes Matos shows off one of his handmade cuatros while playing at the 2006 NEA National Heritage Fellows concert.

Background information
- Born: August 16, 1940 (age 85)
- Origin: Camuy, Puerto Rico
- Occupations: Luthier, Musician

Diomedes Matos is a Puerto Rican musician and master instrument maker who is most famous for building string instruments. He built his first guitar at age 12 and later studied and mastered construction techniques for several traditional stringed instruments including cuatros, requintos, classical guitars, and the Puerto Rican tres. Matos' instruments are in great demand and he has won many awards and honors for his work. In 2006, he was awarded a National Heritage Fellowship by the National Endowment for the Arts, which is the United States government's highest honor in the folk and traditional arts. He resides in Deltona, Florida.
