= Epstein Brothers Orchestra =

American klezmer band

The Epstein Brothers Orchestra (also known as the Epstein Brothers) was a Jewish musical quartet from the United States who mainly played Klezmer music.

It consisted of the four New York City born brothers, Max Epstein (October 4, 1912 – March 18, 2000), William "Willie" Epstein (March 3, 1919 – July 2, 1999), Julius "Julie" Epstein (November 4, 1926 – July 25, 2015) and Isidore "Chi" Epstein (December 28, 1913 – November 9, 1986).

In 1996 Max, William and Julius Epstein performed together in the documentary A Tickle in the Heart which told the story of the four brothers. Chi died in 1986.

The Epstein Brothers were recipients of a 1998 National Heritage Fellowship awarded by the National Endowment for the Arts, which is the United States government's highest honor in the folk and traditional arts.

Since the death of William on July 2, 1999 and Max on March 18, 2000 in Fort Lauderdale, Florida, Julius Epstein was the last surviving member of the band. He lived with his wife Esther in Sarasota, Florida until his death in July 2015.
