= Manuel Donley =

Tejano musician (1927–2020)

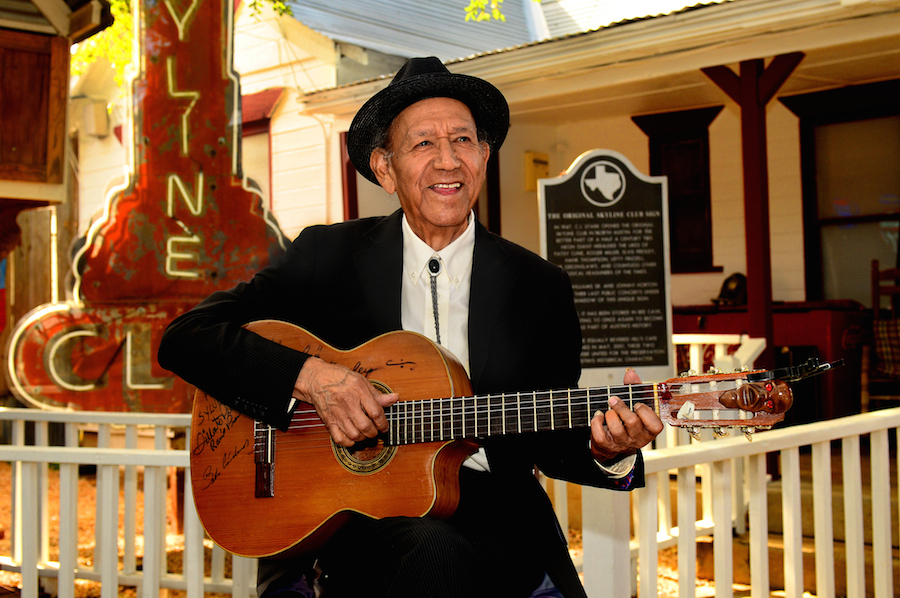
Donley in 2014

Manuel "Cowboy" Donley (July 26, 1927 – June 28, 2020) was a Mexican-born pioneer of Tejano music.

In the 1940s, Donley, who had dropped out of school in the 7th grade, took a pioneering role in the orquesta sound, combining Mexican and American popular music elements and inspired by big band. He toured the Midwest and Texas for decades. In 1955, he began playing with his band Las Estrellas. During his career, he recorded over 150 singles.

On September 28, 2024, Donley's family will perform a tribute to honor his legacy in Austin, Texas.

== Personal life ==
Manuel Donley Quiñones was born in Durango, Mexico to Ramón Donley and Dolores Quiñones. He had eight siblings. The name Donley is from his great-grandfather, who was an Irish immigrant to Texas.

== Awards ==
He was a recipient of a 2014 National Heritage Fellowship awarded by the National Endowment for the Arts, which is the United States government's highest honor in the folk and traditional arts. He was inducted into the Tejano Music Hall of Fame in 1986.
