= Buck Ramsey =

American cowboy poet and singer

Buck Ramsey (January 9, 1938 – January 3, 1998), born Kenneth Melvin Ramsey, was an American cowboy poet and singer. He earned a national reputation for preserving cowboy lore and traditions.

== Early life ==
Ramsey was born in New Home, Texas, into a musical family. His father gave his newborn son the nickname Buckskin Tarbox, and from then on he went by the nickname Buck. He was the oldest son of the family and the middle child with five sisters and a younger brother. As a child he attended a two-room schoolhouse at Middle Well near Amarillo. Growing up in the farmland his childhood dream was to become a cowboy. His uncles, especially Uncle Ed, told stories and taught him cowboy ways and cowboy songs. Born with perfect pitch, he learned traditional shape note singing and sang regularly in Primitive Baptist Church "sings" and choirs. When he was a young teen he moved with his family to Amarillo. In high school, he sang with a band called the Sandie Swingsters.

In 1956, Buck graduated from Amarillo High School and enrolled in what is now Texas Tech. To support himself in school, he worked at part-time jobs on ranches around Lubbock. His love of the outdoors made him quickly leave school to travel around the country. In 1958 he returned to Texas and enrolled in what is now West Texas A&M University. He continued working as a cowboy on big West Texas ranches. He continued this life until 1962, when injuries sustained in a riding accident left him paralyzed from the chest down. He got around in a wheelchair for the rest of his life.

== Poet and musician ==
During rehabilitation after his accident, he rekindled an earlier interest in cowboy poetry. He submitted some poems to the National Cowboy Poetry Gathering in Elko, Nevada. That began his career as a professional cowboy poet, performer and songwriter. His work artfully chronicled cowboy lore and traditions, earning him a national reputation for preserving cowboy culture. He performed and recorded the old ranching and trail songs, with the idea of saving them for posterity. His peers regarded his contemporary cowboy poetry as some of the best in that genre. His recordings of the traditional "Rolling Uphill from Texas" (1992) and "My Home It Was in Texas" (1994) each won Western Heritage Wrangler Awards from the National Cowboy Hall of Fame. In 1993 his epic poem, As I Rode Out on the Morning, was published by Texas Tech University Press. The prologue, "Anthem," was highly acclaimed as a standalone work.

Buck Ramsey's awards and achievements include a National Heritage Fellowship from the National Endowment for the Arts (1995), Lifetime Achievement and Best Poetry Book awards from the Academy of Western Artists (1996), and the Golden Spur Award from the National Cowboy Hall of Fame in 1997. His performances of cowboy poetry and songs have been featured at the Smithsonian Institution and at the Gene Autry Western Heritage Museum in Los Angeles.

His awards continued after his death in 1998. In 2002 the Academy of Western Artists named their annual poetry book award the Buck Ramsey Award in his honor. A two-CD set of his recordings titled Hittin' the Trail was released by Smithsonian Folkways Recordings in 2003. It won the 2004 Western Heritage Wrangler Award.
