= Thomas Maupin (buck dancer) =

American buck dancer

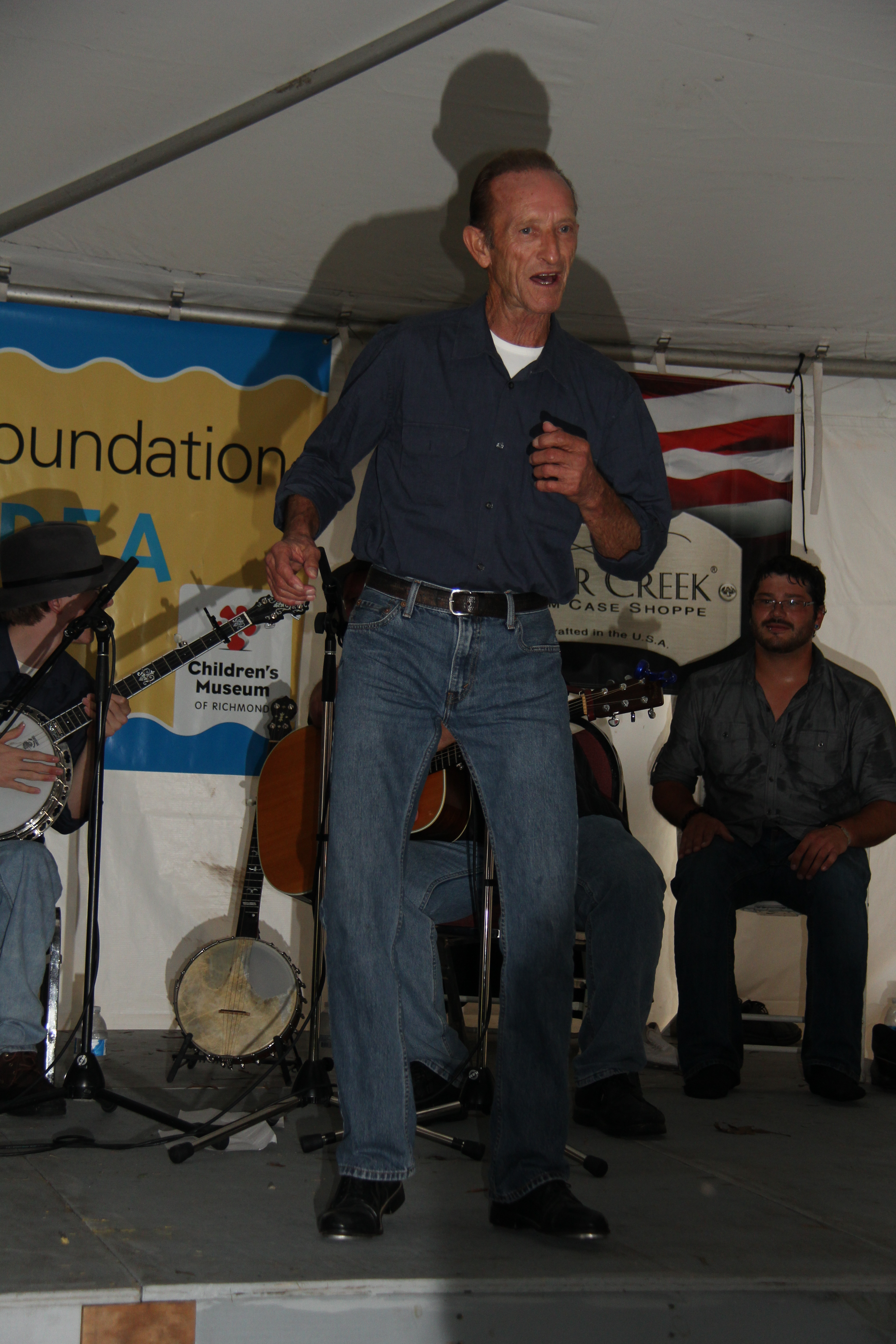
Thomas Maupin in 2013

Thomas Maupin (born 1938 in Eagleville, Tennessee) is an American buck dancer from Eagleville, Tennessee, known for his flatfoot style of dance in the Appalachian tradition.

He is a former state champion in Tennessee, Kentucky, Georgia, Alabama, and Indiana. He has also won several national and regional championships. In 2011, he won the Tennessee Governor’s Folklife Heritage Award, and in 2017, he received a National Heritage Fellowship from the National Endowment for the Arts. In 2010, director Stewart Copeland released the documentary film Let Your Feet Do the Talkin about Maupin.

Thomas has participated in the Tennessee Traditional Arts Apprenticeship Program, serving as a mentor to young dancers.

He resides in Murfreesboro. Maupinfest, an old-time music and dance festival held every September in Unionville, Tennessee, is named in his honor.

Thomas usually performs with his grandson, Daniel Rothwell, an old time banjo player.
