= Elizabeth James-Perry =

Wampanoag artist from Massachusetts, U.S.

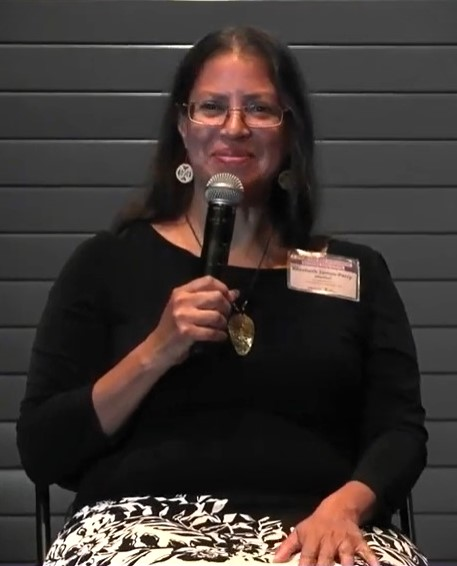
- James-Perry in 2023
- Born: 1973 (age 52–53)
- Citizenship: Wampanoag Tribe of Gay Head (Aquinnah) and American
- Education: University of Massachusetts Dartmouth
- Occupations: Artist; Restoration ecologist
- Awards: National Heritage Fellowship (2023)
- Website: elizabethjamesperry.com

Elizabeth James-Perry (Aquinnah Wampanoag, born 1973) is a Native American artist and marine biologist. She creates wampum beadwork, woven textiles, porcupine quillwork and other art forms of Eastern Woodlands Native people. She was a 2023 National Heritage Fellow.

== Early life and family ==
Elizabeth James-Perry was born in 1973. Her mother, Patricia James-Perry (Aquinnah Wampanoag, born 1944), specializes in scrimshaw. While traveling in Europe, Elizabeth learned about colonists' mistaken belief that the paint on the Wampanoag clothing was, according to her, "fine lace on leather". Her newfound knowledge about past Wampanoag artists inspired her to preserve traditional knowledge.

James-Perry is a citizen of the Wampanoag Tribe of Gay Head, a federally recognized tribe headquartered in Aquinnah, Massachusetts. As of March 2023, James-Perry lives in Dartmouth, Massachusetts. In addition to her mother, her brother Jonathan is also a scrimshaw artist, and other influences include her cousins Helen Attaquin (her basket weaving teacher) and Nanepashemut Tony Pollard, both artists, and her coiled pottery teacher Ramona Peters.

== Art career ==
As an artist, James-Perry specializes in wampum, natural dyeing, and textile art. She hand carved and polishes wampum beads because she wants wearers to "get a sense of being involved in the story of the piece", thus supporting Native American culture. Allison Hill described her work "as extraordinarily beautiful and exquisitely hand-crafted", also saying that it involves "weav[ing] historical research and familial knowledge [...] to reflect deep cultural and historical significance".

The New Bedford Whaling Museum hosted "Ripples: Through a Wampanoag Lens" (2020–21), an exhibition of her wampum and scrimshaw work to highlight Wampanoag cultural continuity. In 2021, James-Perry worked on Radiant Community, one of the two installations in "Garden for Boston", a collaboration with Ekua Holmes outside the Museum of Fine Arts, Boston. Paige Curtis described Radiant Community, in which the Cyrus Edwin Dallin statue Appeal to the Great Spirit is surrounded by corn, beans, and sedge grass in reference to the Three Sisters of Indigenous agriculture, "as a counterproposal to [the statue], asserting the beauty of a neighboring community now facing rampant gentrification." She also worked as an artist-in-residence and teacher at Amherst College from 2021 until 2022.

In September 2023, she started two solo exhibits: Double Arrows at Tufts University and Seeping In at the Mead Art Museum.

== Ecology and tribal preservation ==
James-Perry has a degree in marine science from the University of Massachusetts Dartmouth and also works on ecological restoration projects, including the reintroduction of native plant life and participation in consultation processes. She had previously worked as a tribal preservation officer, an experience that inspired her "deeper appreciation for tribal territories and tribal waters".

== Collections ==
Her artwork is in the permanent collections of the Montclair Art Museum, Museum of Fine Arts, Boston, Peabody Essex Museum, Tropenmuseum, and the Wallraf–Richartz Museum.

== Awards and honors ==
In February 2023, James-Perry was announced as one of the eight 2023 National Heritage Fellows. She was the first Wampanoag person to be selected as a fellow. She said that her status as fellow will increase broader visibility of the Indigenous art of the Northeastern United States. In August 2023, she participated in the Santa Fe Indian Market.

- 2010 Heard Museum Art Market Textile Division First Place
- 2014 Mass Cultural Council Fellow
- 2023 National Heritage Fellow
- New England Foundation for the Arts Grant
- Southern New England Traditional Arts Apprenticeship

== Selected exhibitions ==
2020

- Ripples: Through a Wampanoag Lens, New Bedford Whaling Museum

2023

- Double Arrows, Tufts University
- Seeping In, Mead Art Museum

undated

- Aquinnah Cultural Center
- Boston Children's Museum
- Cape Cod National Seashore Salt Pond Visitor Center
- Mashantucket Pequot Museum and Research Center
- Peabody Essex Museum
- Roger Williams University
