= Susan Hudson (artist) =

Canadian visual artist

RCA Susan Hudson
- Born: 1941 (age 84–85); Montreal, Quebec
- Education: Ecole des Beaux Arts, the Saidye Bronfman Centre for the Arts and the Montreal Museum School of Art and Design.
- Known for: Works inspired by fairy tales
- Elected: In 1999 to the Royal Canadian Academy of Arts
- Website: susanhudsonartist.com

Susan Hudson (born 1941) is a Canadian visual artist. Her work is held in the collection of the National Gallery of Canada.

== Early life and education ==
Susan Hudson was born in Montreal, Quebec and is currently based in Lunenburg, Nova Scotia. She was educated at the Ecole des Beaux Arts, the Saidye Bronfman Centre for the Arts and the Montreal Museum School of Art and Design.

== Career ==
Hudson worked as an illustrator and graphic designer before starting printmaking in 1965. Following this her print, painting and photography explored the subconscious and fantasy.

In 1977 Hudson joined Concordia University and became a full-time visiting assistant professor in 1978. While working to expand Concordia's graphic design department, Hudson continued to maintain her art practice, designing and illustrating books, magazine articles, among other artistic endeavors. She was promoted to Associate Professor of Fine Arts at Concordia in 1983.

Hudson created a series of etchings based on contemporary figures, mostly faces, with plants and animals. They were used to illustrate the book The Eternal Peter Pan: Selections from Peter Pan and Wendy by James M. Barrie (1987), published by Tundra Books. In these etchings Hudson elaborated on some of the more whimsical and intriguing aspects of Barrie's writing. The etchings, tackling the theme of Peter Pan, were enhanced with hand-painted water colour patterned borders. The Eternal Peter Pan was the first volume of a trilogy which also included Peter Pan: The Complete Book (1988) and Peter Pan: The Complete Play (1988), each illustrated by Hudson.

Hudson was the chairperson at the Concordia University Department of Design Art as an associate professor. In 1998 she retired from Concordia and relocated to Lunenburg. In 1999 she was elected into the Royal Canadian Academy of Arts.

Hudson is a founding member of the ViewPoint Gallery in Halifax and a co-founder of the Peer Gallery co-operative in Lunenburg.

== Collections ==
Three of Hudson's photographs were purchased by the National Gallery of Canada for the Canadian Photography Institute, one in 1975: Shadows (1973); two in 1977: The Strongman and Double Bill Nightmare (1975).

== Bibliography ==
- The Eternal Peter Pan: Selections from Peter Pan and Wendy, by J.M. Barrie, Tundra, 1987, ISBN 0887762050. Hudson (Illustrator).
- Peter Pan: The Complete Book, by J.M. Barrie, Tundra, 1988, ISBN 0887762069. Hudson (Illustrator).
- La Gravure au Quebec, Heritage, Montreal, QC.
