= Hmong music =

Music of the Hmong people

Hmong music is an important part of the culture of the Hmong people, an ethnic group from southeast Asia. Because the Hmong language is tonal, there is a close connection between Hmong music and the spoken language. Music is an important part of Hmong life, played for entertainment, for welcoming guests, and at weddings and funerals. Hmong musical instruments includes flutes such as the dra, leaves also called nblaw, two-string vertical fiddle (xim zaus in Hmong), and the qeej or gaeng, a type of mouth organ.

== History ==
The Hmong people trace their origin to the Yellow River region of China around 2700 B.C. In the 16th century Hmong leaders formed a kingdom in the central Chinese provinces of Hunan, Hubei, and Henan. This kingdom existed for several centuries before being defeated by the Chinese government. Surviving Hmong led to the mountains of Guizhou, Yunnan and Sichuan, where many Hmong still live today. In Hmong folktales and songs, this ancient Hmong kingdom is celebrated as a golden age. Accompanying the legend is the story of a Hmong messiah who will someday lead the Hmong people to victory against their oppressors and re-establish the ancient kingdom. It is a story that has inspired Hmong insurrections throughout the centuries. Another popular plot for songs is the story of an orphan who becomes a hero through persistence. The orphan in this story can be seen as a metaphor for the Hmong people, who are without their own country and have to survive wherever they go.

== Songs ==
The Hmong people have used melodic poetry (kwv txhiaj/lug txaj) and traditional textiles/story cloths (paj ntaub) to pass down their history and culture to successive generations. Contemporary Hmong songs are made up of poems using rhyme and clever word play or traditional songs. Skilled singers can gain great fame among the Hmong population across the world. Even though many Hmong people have left their homeland in China, their songs are still connected to the life they had there.

There are several different types of vocal songs: kwv txhiaj (storytelling songs), zaj tshoob (engagement songs), ntau txhuv (wishing songs), laig dab (Invitation songs), hu plig (spirit Invocation songs), ua neeb (possession chant), qhua ke (farewell to the spirit songs), and nyiav (weeping songs).

Kwv Txhiaj are performed mostly by Hmong couples and involve comparing aspects of one's lover to aspects of nature, or to tell a story or explain the details of a ritual. Types of kwv txhiaj include:

- kwv txhiaj plees, a love song based on broken relationships and impractical matches
- kwv txhiaj ua nyab, a bride song which is usually a sad song about leaving her family
- kwv txhiaj cia nyab, a song sung by the groom to reassure the bride-to-be and to convince her not to abandon him
- kwv txhiaj tuag, a song about someone who has died or tells of a wish to die
- kwv txhiaj ntsuag, an orphan's song that can be sung by a widow or a forsaken girl
- kwv txhiaj sib-ncaim, a song about separation
- kwv txhiaj ua tshoob-kos, a wedding song where the groom's side and the bride's side have answering parts.

== Instruments and whistling ==
Instruments are an important part of Hmong music because of the Hmong Whistled Language, a more advance language in which language is communicated through the manipulation of the tongue, shape of the mouth, and tones to create an effect of the Hmong Language. Because of this, Hmong instruments have a tonal quality that allows Hmong words to be heard just by playing the instruments. Although the Hmong Whistled Language is slowly being lost, there have been several attempts at reviving the Hmong Whistled Language.

=== Qeej (𖬀𖬰𖬦𖬵) ===
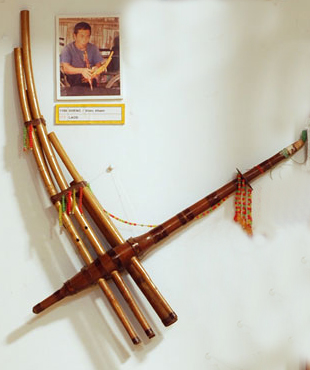
Qeej (Pahawh: 𖬀𖬰𖬦𖬵), free reed gourd mouth organ of the Hmong people

The most well-known instrument is the qeej, a type of reed pipe, in which each tone corresponds to a Hmong spoken word. It is a free-reed gourd mouth organ, used to play a text-based melody in the middle range. It consists of a wooden wind chest, with a long horizontal tapering neck ending in a mouth hole. The wooden section is made from two identical pieces of mahogany bound together with straps. The six bamboo tubes are variously curving or straight and can also change in length from quite small for a child's instrument to about two meters long for a more experience player. Each bamboo tube has a hole for fingering above the wind chest and a metal reed over a hole in the pipe encircled within the wind chest. For extra volume, the lowest tube, which is also the thickest and shortest one, often has two or three reeds. The tubes are inserted vertically through the wind chest. When the player exhales or inhales and covers one or more holes for fingering, this allows air in the tube in motion to create a musical tone. There are two types of qeej composition: text-based and text-free. Both genres are played successively in rituals, including funerals, ancestral rites, offerings to vital spirits, sacrifices to the drum, and marriages.

The qeej is more than an instrument in the Hmong culture. The music it plays is like an extension to the Hmong language, meaning every note symbolizes its own word. To Hmong people, the sounds of the Qeej is like speech and Qeej players are known as story tellers. It is most often played at funerals and its purpose is to communicate with the spiritual world by leading the deceased person to its rightful place. If this fails by all means, the deceased spirit may wander back and bring misfortune to the family.

=== Raj (𖬖𖬰𖬡) ===
Raj are small, sometimes disposable, wind instruments. There are two types of raj: the raj nplaim and the raj lev les. The more popular raj nplaim is a free-reed pipe and is a longer flute than the raj lev les. It uses a small reed to create a buzzing tone quality. It is made in many different sizes and can have from five to seven holes. It is played by sealing one's lips around the reed or by putting the top of the instrument in one's mouth and blowing to make the different pitches. The raj lev les is also a free-reed pipe but it is shorter and recorder-like. The raj lev les can be made out of a small piece of bamboo or grass.

These instruments are known for playing words rather than melodies. This is done by setting pitches to match certain tones of words. In Laos, the raj is commonly associated with Hmong courtship and dating practices. Young boys and girls play songs back and forth that express their feelings to each other. Raj are also played for entertainment purposes or as a way to signal others in the jungle. Although the raj is not played by everyone, most people in Laos could understand the messages played on the instrument because the pitches were based on real tones of the words. Most of these messages were either about loneliness or love.

=== Ncas (𖬗𖬲𖬤𖬰) ===
The ncas is another instrument used in Hmong music similar to the jaw harp. The ncas is a six-inch, thin strip of wood or brass with a blade cut out from it. The ncas is played by vibrating next to the mouth while blowing air through the blade. It is commonly used in Hmong courting practices.

=== Nplooj (𖬌𖬲𖬫𖬰) ===
The nplooj is a leaf, usually a banana leaf that is curled up and positioned in the mouth so it vibrates when it is blown. It makes loud, very high pitched sounds that can be heard from miles away. The varying pitches are made by pulling on the leaf and blowing to make certain tones that relate to words in the Hmong language. This instrument can be made from almost any nearby plant or tree, making it easily accessible for Hmong children. The nplooj was traditionally used during times of war, where they were used to send signals in combat and secret messages communicated with words played as melodies.

== Modernity ==
These traditional forms of music are not as common among younger generations of Hmong, especially those in the Hmong diaspora. The music can still be heard at Hmong cultural festivals, usually performed by community elders.

As of 2018, Hmong acts are growing in popularity.
