= Martin Mulvihill =

Irish fiddler, accordianist, composer, and teacher (1923–1987)

- Born: 1923; Ballygoughlin, County Limerick, Ireland
- Died: 21 July 1987 (aged 63–64); County Limerick, Ireland
- Genres: Irish traditional
- Occupation(s): Traditional musician, composer, teacher, and author
- Instrument: Violin

Martin Mulvihill (born in Ballygoughlin, County Limerick, Ireland in 1923; died 21 July 1987) was an Irish traditional musician, composer, teacher, and author. He composed roughly 25 tunes in the Irish traditional style.

Although his mother Brigid Flynn played the concertina and fiddle, Martin, the youngest of her ten children, was the only one to become a musician.

He began his study of music at the age of nine. From a violin player in the neighboring town of Glin, he learned the rudiments of the fiddle and how to read and write music; from his mother he learned the Irish traditional style. His early repertoire was learned both from written sources such as the Roche Collection of Traditional Irish Music, Ker, and O'Neill's 1001, and from local musicians.

In 1940 at age 17, he joined the Irish Army. After his discharge, he played with Meade's Dance Band in Glin.

In 1951 he emigrated to Northampton, England; there he married Olive McEvoy from County Offaly, with whom he had his four children, Brendan, Brian, Gail, and Dawn. Mulvihill continued playing music during this time, expanding his skills to include button accordion and piano accordion. The latter became his main instrument for several years.

In 1971 the Mulvihill family relocated to New York City. He began teaching music lessons part-time, but as his reputation grew this quickly became his full-time occupation. He taught in Philadelphia, Washington, D.C., and New York. Former students include Eileen Ivers, Mary Rafferty (of Cherish the Ladies), Willie Kelly, and Patrick Clifford.

In 1984, Mulvihill was honored with a NEA National Heritage Fellowship.

In 1986, he self-published a songbook titled First Collection of Traditional Irish Music.

On 21 July 1987, while on vacation in County Limerick, Ireland, he suffered a heart attack and died.

All four of the Mulvihill children are musicians, with Brendan having become a noted performer and recording artist in the traditional Irish fiddle genre.

== Discography ==
- Traditional Irish Fiddling from County Limerick (Green Linnet LP/cassette, 1978), with Mick Moloney
- Irish Music: The Living Tradition (Green Linnet LP/cassette, 1978), Martin Mulvihill School
- The Humors of Glin (Global Village cassette, 1986), with Donie O'Sullivan and Gabriel Fitzmaurice
