= Altrisuoni =

Swiss record label

Altrisuoni (portmanteau of the Italian words 'altri' and 'suoni', meaning 'other sounds') is an independent Swiss jazz record label created in 1993 by Romano Nardelli, Stefano Franchini and Christian Gilardi. From 2016, Altrisuoni belongs to PBR Records Ltd, a Swiss production and distribution company based in Roche, near Montreux.
