= Ilias Kementzides =

Pontian Greek folk musician from Kazakhstan

- Born: April 2, 1926; Nikolinka, Kazakhstan
- Died: November 11, 2006 (aged 80) Norwalk, Connecticut
- Genres: Pontian Greek folk music
- Occupation: Musician
- Instruments: Pontic lyra, vocals
- Spouse: Chrysoula Kementzides
- Awards: National Heritage Fellowship

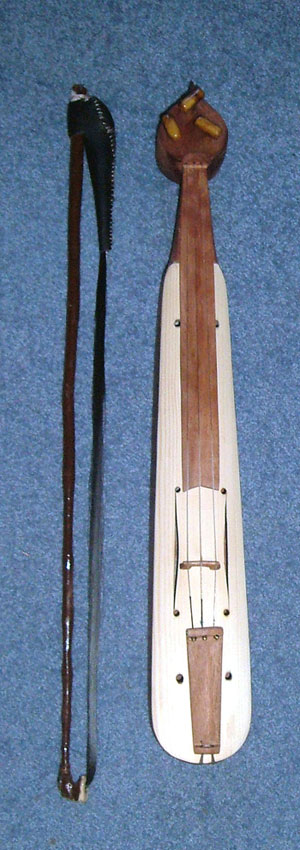
Example of a lyra

Ilias Kementzides (April 2, 1926 - November 11, 2006) was an American musician of Pontian Greek descent. He both played and sang Pontian Greek folk music. His main instrument was the lyra, which is a type of kemenche. In 1989, he received the National Heritage Fellowship for his folk music career.

== Biography ==
Ilias Kementzides was born in Nikolinka, Kazakhstan to Pontian Greek parents on April 2, 1926. His mother was a Caucasus Greek from Kars, and his father had emigrated to Russia from the Pontos in 1912. He had four siblings. When Kementzides was eight years old, he learned to play the lyra from his uncle, a musician. His family moved to Greece in 1940. They lived in Krya Vrysi outside of Thessaloniki in a community with other Pontian Greeks.

In Greece, Kementzides worked as a farmer. He earned extra money as a musician, performing at theaters and social clubs. He typically sang in Romeika, which is traditionally spoken by Pontians, but he was also fluent in Russian, Greek, and Turkish. He built his own instruments.

While in Greece, Ilias Kementzides met his wife, Chrysoula Kementzides, with whom he had three children. He did not make enough money to support his family, so he and his wife decided to emigrate. Ilias Kementzides had also been outspoken against the Greek junta, which ruled Greece from 1967 to 1974, and he felt pressured to leave the country. In 1974, Kementzides and his family moved to the United States. They settled in Norwalk, Connecticut, where he found work in an electronics factory. He continued to play the lyra and sing, establishing himself as a musician within the local Pontian diaspora community. Kementzides often performed at weddings, religious celebrations, and dances in Connecticut and New York.

Kementzides also played at cultural festivals. For example, he performed at the 13th Annual Queens Ethnic Festival in the Astoria, Queens, New York City in 1988, alongside Pontian singer Panayiotis Vassiliades. In 2002, he performed at Music Around the Mediterranean, also in Astoria, Queens.

In 1989, Ilias Kementzides received the National Heritage Fellowship, an honor given to American folk artists by the National Endowment for the Arts. He was also featured in the film The Spirit Travels, a documentary about immigrant music in the United States.

Kementzides died in 2006 in his home in Norwalk.
