= Susan Hudson (quilter) =

American Navajo quilter (born 1957 or 1958)

- Born: 1957 or 1958 (age 66–67); East Los Angeles, California, U.S.
- Occupation: Quilter
- Awards: National Heritage Fellow (2024)

Susan Hudson (born 1957 or 1958) is an American and Navajo Nation quilter. A 2024 National Heritage Fellow, she works on ledger art quilts with historical narratives, focusing on Navajo history.

== Biography ==
Hudson was born in 1957 or 1958 in East Los Angeles, California to the Deeshchíí'nii clan. Three of her ancestors were part of the Long Walk of the Navajo, and her grandmother Mary Ann Foster is a master weaver. As a young child, she sewed and quilted for clothing due to being in poverty, having learned it from her mother Dorothy Woods, who learned it at an American Indian boarding school, before doing so for her children.

Initially starting with quilts made of clothing scraps, Hudson was already making star quilts before Senator Ben Nighthorse Campbell asked her to do them for Native American community events and later convinced her to use quilting for activism. In 2011, she then started creating ledger art quilts with historical narratives, focusing on Navajo history. Her first work, which had a family tree motif, was inspired by a dream she had of seeing her ancestors on a zoetrope, including her grandparents and Narbona. Her art tackles subjects such as the Long Walk of the Navajo, American Indian boarding schools, Missing and Murdered Indigenous Women, and immigration detention in the United States.

Hudson became runner-up at the Heard Museum Guild Indian Fair and Market's quilt division during her first appearance. She later became competing and winner in art contests, later saying at one point that she "beat out Johnny Depp". The Farmington Daily Times called her the "first Navajo quilter to break into juried Native American arts shows by winning first-place prizes in textiles and best-of-show titles". In 2019, she won the Autry Museum of the American West Judge's Choice Award. She was featured on "Quilts", a 2019 episode of Craft in America; she had been invited to the program after her work was noticed by executive producer Carol Sauvion the previous year. In August 2024, she was appointed a National Heritage Fellow. She also co-founded the Navajo Quilt Project, a non-governmental organization which supplies Navajo Nation elders with donated fabric.

As of 2019, Hudson has an art studio in Ignacio, Colorado. Her quilts go through a long creation process which "can take up to 18 months to complete, including sewing by machine and sewing details and binding by hand". Her work is in the permanent collections of the Autry Museum of the American West, Heard Museum, International Quilt Museum, Museum of Riverside, and the National Museum of the American Indian.

Outside of art, Hudson also works as a federal government employee; regarding any issues with discussing political subjects under that status, she told the Navajo Times in 2019: "It's art. They can’t say anything."

An enrolled Navajo Nation citizen, Hudson is a member of the Kinyaa'áanii clan. She lives in Sheep Springs, New Mexico as of 2024.
