= Dorothy Grant =

Haida fashion designer (born 1955

- Born: 1955 (age 70–71); Hydaburg, Alaska
- Citizenship: Haida
- Years active: 1988–present
- Known for: Haida fashion designer
- Website: dorothygrant.com

Dorothy Grant CM RCA (born 1955) is an Indigenous fashion designer whose works have gained public recognition as expressions of living Haida culture.

== Biography ==
=== Early life ===
Grant was born in 1955 in Hydaburg, Alaska, but was raised in Ketchikan. She is a Kaigani Haida of the Raven Clan from the Brown Bear house of Howkan. Her family crests include Two-Finned Killer Whale, Shark, Berry Picker in the Moon, and Brown Bear. She was trained in traditional Haida art forms such as the creation of button blankets, appliqué, as well as basket weaving by her family and elders, including Florence Edenshaw.

Grant had spent time as a member of the Rainbow Creek Dancers alongside her then-husband Robert Davidson. She was often responsible for creating regalia for the dancers.

During the mid-1980's Grant was inspired by Bill Reid to innovate Haida art by applying it to fashion. During a meeting with several Haida artists, including Reid, who had recently come back from Paris, he was quoted by Grant as saying "somebody's gotta do fashion, or there's gonna be somebody over there in Paris... who's gonna take our art and put it on stuff and make it really bad. So somebody's gotta do fashion." This prompted Grant to pursue fashion seriously. Grant attended the Helen Lefeaux School of Fashion Design in 1987.

=== Professional development ===
Grant broke onto the scene in the early 1980s when she began sketching Haida artwork onto clothing. Grant's first collection was debuted in 1989 and featured 55 pieces. About the collection's debut, Grant has said, "It had a big impact because nobody was doing it at the time". Lisa Tant noted in her article "Dorothy Grant's Haida Couture", for BC Woman, that Grant was the first "Aboriginal designer to combine traditional Haida ceremonial dress with contemporary fashion." For example, some of her pieces utilize the tapering lines (Formline art) of the Haida ceremonial copper, notably its central T-ridge. Indeed, Grant has gained international acclaim for producing garments that infuse myth with fabric and for using fashion to share Canadian Northwest culture with a broader audience. This event brought much demand for Grant's work, "I just remember being so busy for several months after that with people coming and wanting to order things". In 1994, the Dorothy Grant Boutique opened at the Sinclair Centre in Vancouver, BC.

Grant's critics have accused her of "going commercial", however Grant refutes such claims, arguing that if fashion products are produced with a "certain finesse that represents Haida culture and Canada, I don't think that's a sell-out. I think that's a positive step toward creating an employment for Native people and a national identity."

By 1999, after five successful years in retail, Grant was granted the National Aboriginal Achievement Award, now the Indspire Awards in recognition of her successful venture, the First Nations Drum, Canada's largest First Nations newspaper. Grant closed her retail store in 2008 and moved into a studio in Vancouver's SOMA District.

Grant continues to be recognized for both her artistic talent and business skill. In 2003, the Asper Business Institute named Grant "Business Woman of the Year." Six years later, B.C. Aboriginal Business Awards awarded Grant the "Individual Achievement Award."

In 2020, her work was exhibited in the landmark exhibition Hearts of Our People: Native Women Artists at the Smithsonian American Art Museum.

Notable clients include Robin Williams, Marie Osmond, and Susan Aglukark.

Her self-named book, Dorothy Grant, was published in 2024 and provides a lookback at her work.

=== Collector recognition ===
In addition to clothing North American dignitaries and celebrities, Grant's detailed garments are available for public viewing in 13 museums from Canada to the United Kingdom.

The Canadian Museum of Civilization in Ottawa purchased, "Raven Creation Tunic," a garment depicting a Raven myth, and "Hummingbird Copper Panel Dress" for their permanent collection. Also available for public viewing in Ottawa, ON, is Grant's "Seven Raven Button Blanket," part of the permanent exhibit at the National Gallery of Canada. Further west, the Museum of Anthropology in Vancouver, BC, holds Grant's "Raven Greatcoat."

Other notable museum displays include: "Raven Cape," Vancouver Museum in Vancouver, BC; "Supernatural Frog Button Robe," in DeYoung Museum in San Francisco, CA; "Raven Coat," formerly displayed by the Seattle Art Museum in Seattle, WA; "Shark Blanket," in Burke Museum in Seattle, WA; "Raven Chilkat Robe," in the Natural History Museum in New York NY; "Raven Button Robe" in the Liverpool World Museum in Liverpool, UK.

In 2016, Grant designed a tuxedo for The Revenant's Duane Howard to wear to the Oscars.

== Product lines ==
Dorothy Grant, Grant's designer label, offers men and women's clothing. While her designer label work has gained recognition by Hollywood and collectors alike, she launched Red Raven in 2010 in conjunction with the 2010 Winter Olympics in Vancouver, BC.

== Awards and honours ==
- Royal Canadian Academy of Arts
- Member of the Order of Canada.
- Best Professional Design Award
- Winds of Change design competition – "Best Designer" award
- Voted One of 100 Most Influential Women in British Columbia by Vancouver Sun Newspaper
- BC Achievement Award for Individual Lifetime Achievement Award in Business
- "A Single Thread: Celebrating Native American Indian Design & Style" design award
- 2007 Eric and Barbara Dobkin Fellowship at the School for Advanced Research
- Royal Canadian Academy Prestigious Award for the Arts
- Asper Business Institute – "Business Woman of the Year" award
- National Aboriginal Achievement Business Award
- Winds of Change design competition – "Best Designer" award
- National Aboriginal Achievement Award
- Asper Business Institute "Business Woman of the Year"
