= Haida argillite carvings =

Indigenous art tradition of the Pacific Northwest

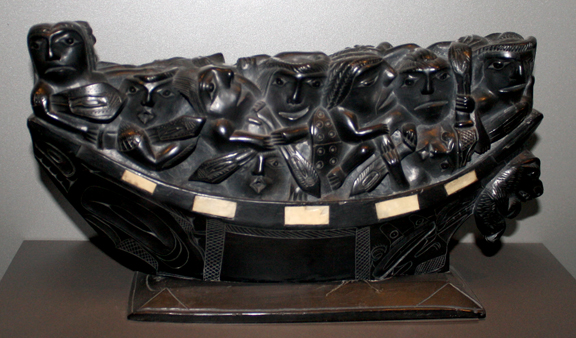
Carving depicting a canoe with oarsmen, bone inlay, Haida Gwaii, ca. 1850–1900, NMAI

Haida argillite carvings are a sculptural tradition among the Haida indigenous nation of the Northwest Coast of North America. It first became a widespread art form in the early 19th century, and continues today.

== Background ==
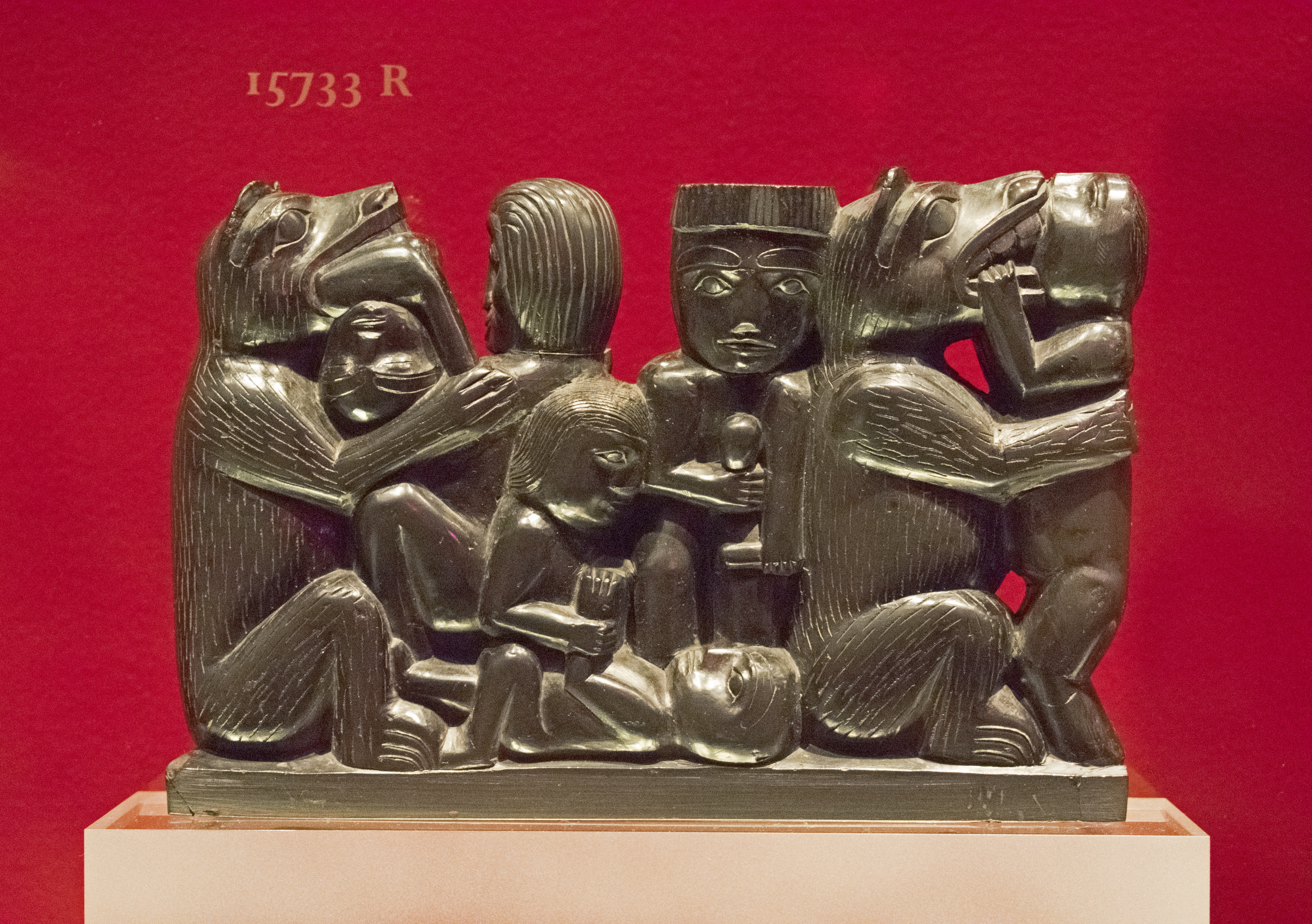
Haida figure group, 1880–1900, Royal British Columbia Museum

Argillite became a popular carving medium after the decline of the sea otter fur trade in the early 19th century. These carvings enabled Haida to trade with visiting Europeans. Argillite carvings, therefore, are commonly seen as a tourist art because they were firstly designed to be exported from the Haida community and created solely as a means of economic prosperity. As a result, argillite carvings contain imagery that encompass both Haida and European cultures. Sometimes the imagery is mixed with traditional Haida forms melding with European styles. Often in argillite carvings, traditional Haida images are confused so that they lose their important cultural meanings. This ensured that culturally symbolic imagery was not being used as a means of economic prosperity for the community. These forms of argillite carvings also contained a lot of visual punning and joke making both at objects and animals in general as well as European culture. The argillite that the Haida use to carve is located on Haida Gwaii, formerly known as the Queen Charlotte Islands. The quarry is owned by the Haida who have the sole right to use the substance from that quarry for carving. Today argillite carvings are sold in galleries and fine art stores and take on more traditional Haida forms.

Haida artists have been carving the black slate of the island of Haida Gwaii for several hundred years. From its conception, the art has depicted a variety of images, from traditional Haida forms, to Western figures. Despite this, Haida argillite carving has only been studied systematically during the last thirty to forty years. It is commonly known as a tourist art because of the circumstances surrounding its creation and the subject matter which it often contained. In truth, argillite carving is much more than a simple tourist art. The art form has grown to be highly prized by museums and private collectors. Canadian anthropologists and ethnographers have been studying argillite for approximately 60 years as have, albeit more recently, American art historians. Argillite carving continues to thrive today and it can be expected that new phases and periods will emerge as time goes on.

== Location and composition ==
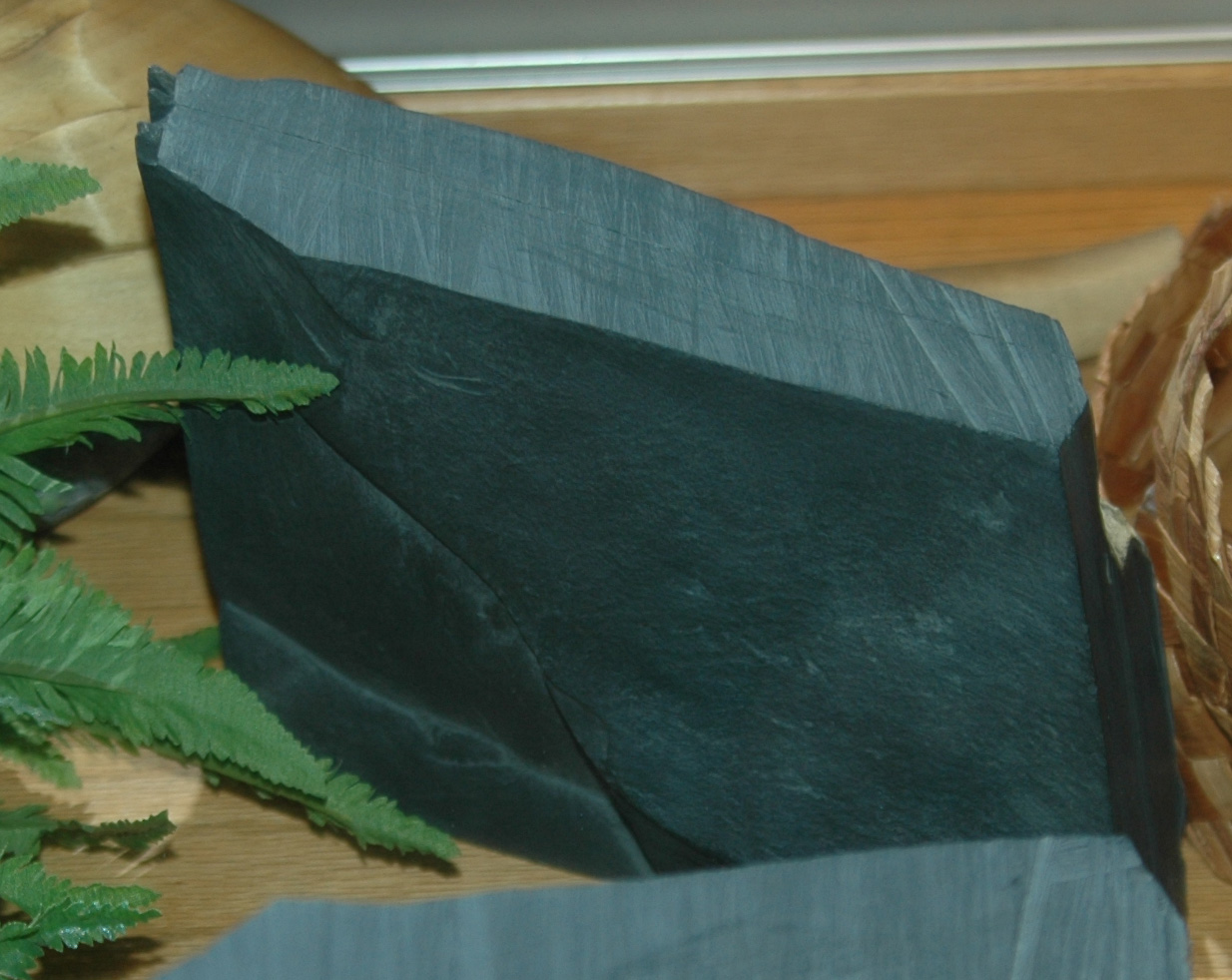
A piece of raw argillite from Haida Gwaii.

Argillite is similar to the substance known as catlinite which was used by the indigenous peoples of the American Plains to carve their ceremonial pipes. However, while catlinite is of a reddish-brown color because of its high iron oxide content, argillite is a dark-grey to black color because of its higher carbon content.

Argillite used by the Haida is found at the Slatechuck argillite quarry on Slatechuck Mountain near Skidegate on the east flank of Graham Island of Haida Gwaii. In the Skidegate dialect of the Haida language argillite is called kwawhlhal. The quarry is very difficult to get to and its exact location is a heavily guarded secret by those who are able to point it out on a map. Argillite is an important commodity for the Haida people and presently only the Haida have the right to use the variety found at Slatechuck Creek, which occurs nowhere else in the world. One of the first documented reports of the Slatechuck quarry occur in about 1820 when prospectors looking for coal or copper came across a large deposit of the black slate. According to Marius Barbeau, a Canadian ethnographer who studied argillite throughout the 1940s and 1950s, the native owner of the land the quarry was located on was George Gunya, one of the first known argillite carvers.

The argillite from the Slatechuck quarry does not contain quartz or feldspar, and the organic matrix from which it is constructed is highly complex, characteristics which make it different from other argillites. The Slatechuck argillite began to form about 70 million years ago when a nearby vent in the Earth's crust heated a shale layer formed of kaolin and carbonaceous matrices. To the naked eye, argillite looks similar to other forms of shale, but differs microscopically as there are high amounts of organic materials trapped throughout the matrix.

== Collecting, carving and storage techniques ==
Although carvers usually prefer to collect argillite from the quarry themselves, it is not uncommon for groups of able-bodied individuals other than the carvers to make the arduous journey. These trips generally consist of a number of individuals who bring back enough argillite for carvers to carve for at least a year. The argillite collectors select the slate that appears most free of faults. A slab of up to 500-600 pounds (approximately 227-272 kilograms) is cut from the quarry using a variety of tools, including a hand saw, steel wedge, sledge hammer, shovel, crowbar, and long pole to use for leverage. The large slab is cut into smaller pieces of between 50 and 100 pounds each, and carried slowly and carefully home by the collectors.

Most carvers create a sculpture from a single piece of argillite wherever possible. However, because an increase in the size of argillite increases the potential for failure in the piece due to inherent faults and stresses, larger sculptures are sometimes made from separate pieces carved and subsequently adhered. High relief is often carved by working against the grain. This technique lends stability to the fragile argillite. The drawback to this method is that it sometimes causes flaking, making carving in high relief an advanced carving technique. For a long, shallow piece, it is often better to work with the grain. Different objects require varying levels of skill in their execution. Panel pipes are considered the most difficult pieces to carve. Bowls are also challenging, with group figurines, boxes, poles and plates considered easier to do. The black finish of argillite is usually not natural. In its natural state, argillite is often a grey-black or green-black color. The jet-black finish is created by the carver rubbing the carving with the oils or polish as it is being created. The natural oils that skin produces are actually responsible for creating the deep black color argillite is known for, although it is also common to coat the argillite with a polish to recreate the jet-black color.

A high moisture content makes argillite easier to carve; therefore, it is kept as moist as possible after it is extracted from the Slatechuck quarry. It is often wrapped with damp cloth and stored somewhere moist, perhaps buried in the ground. Another method of sealing in moisture is to cover the surface of the uncarved argillite piece with Varathane. The drier the argillite becomes, the more danger there is of flaking or cracking during the carving process.

== Potential origins of Haida argillite carving ==
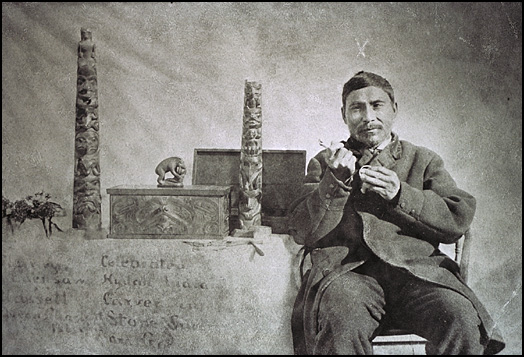
Charles Edenshaw (ca. 1839–1920) and carvings

Knut Fladmark, a professor in the Archaeology Department at Simon Fraser University, believes argillite was known to the Haida pre-European contact, and that it had been used for more utilitarian purposes such as the creation of labrets. Fladmark excavated at the Richardson Ranch site on Graham Island, located near the mouth of the Tlell River. During the summers of 1969 and 1970 he found the first major archaeological assemblage of argillite. Fladmark's analysis of the assemblage led him to believe that the creation of argillite pieces for the purpose of trade followed its use within the Haida community as a pipestone. The elbow pipes Fladmark discovered at the site may predate the generally accepted 1820 start date for the production of argillite as a saleable commodity. These elbow pipes have little to no decoration and seemingly serve a utilitarian purpose only, characteristics which separate them from the later non-functional panel pipes, and other solely aesthetic argillite pieces. Also, Fladmark notes the discovery of a labret in the archaeological record which appears to be made from argillite.

Robin Kathleen Wright believes it was the introduction of the tobacco pipe into the Haida culture that spawned the first argillite carvings. Smoking tobacco was introduced to the Haida by European and American sailors. Argillite pipes that show evidence of smoking tobacco date from about 1810–1840 and are generally small in size but have proportionally large bowls. These very early argillite pieces depict traditional Haida images normally seen on totem poles, masks, rattles and spoon handles.

Haida art has always held images of rank, lineage and status and it can be perceived as a type of "recording device" for a society which has a rich history but no written tradition. Commercial argillite carving seems to have begun during the 1820s when it became valued as a trade item. Haida do not during this time seem to use argillite for any utilitarian function, or any function other than carving. For the Haida, argillite was perhaps part of a movement towards greater financial gain. Increased monetary wealth became more important throughout the 19th century and the sale of argillite was one method that facilitated this. Prior to 1820 there were no argillite carvings found in any public or private collections. Part of the movement toward argillite carving was the declining sea otter populations and the subsequent wane in the trade of sea otter pelts.

== Understanding stylistic phases ==
=== Marius Barbeau ===
Canadian ethnographer Marius Barbeau was one of the first to analyze the art extensively. Barbeau believed that argillite carving had been created through the Haida's exposure to whalers' scrimshaw during contact with European and Euro-American traders. However, as later researchers have noted, the art of scrimshaw was not introduced to the Haida until approximately 20 years after the start of argillite carving. Barbeau also believed that the argillite carving only began to progress into a new phase around 1870, when more traditional themes began to replace the Western oriented styles that had dominated argillite carving until that point. In his research Barbeau overlooked the earliest argillite carvings which made use of entirely traditional images.

=== Carole Kaufmann ===
Carole Kaufmann, an art historian from the University of California, made large contributions to the understanding of Haida argillite carving in her Ph.D. dissertation Changes in Argillite Carvings, 1820 to 1910 where she analyzed the social and cultural influences on the style and type of carving being produced at the time. Kaufmann's first period was one of exploration in a new medium. Argillite carving at this time parallels carvings in other mediums, such as wood.

This first phase, named Haida I, existed from about 1820 to 1830. The second phase began in 1830 and was titled the Western Period. This is when argillite carving began to incorporate Western elements and themes. Kaufman refutes the idea that this phase is influenced by European and Euro-American buyers who wanted to purchase Haida carved argillite in Western themes. She also disagrees with the theory Barbeau and Erna Gunther proposed: that Western themed argillite carving was inspired by whalers' scrimshaw. Kaufmann interprets the move toward Western images in the 1830s as the Haida's receptivity to European culture, and the social desire to incorporate the Western mode of life more fully into their own world. Phases one and two are similar in that none of the items carved are sacred; instead all of the argillite carvings produced between 1820 and 1865, the approximate end date for the second period, are utilitarian pieces and completely secular in nature. The third period Haida II, is marked by a return to Haida inspired images, theme and styles and begins five years after the end of the second, in 1870. Although this return to more traditional images has been interpreted as stabilization in Haida society due to the decrease of whalers and traders in the region, Kaufmann believes the substitution was actually caused by the disintegration of social and artistic regulation. Because the Haida population had been decimated due to contact elements such as disease, increased mobility, and missionary influences the traditional rules which regulated the production of culturally important objects and images began to degrade. According to Kaufmann, the proliferation of sacred or respected imagery or objects in a medium such as argillite was in actuality "a loosening within the traditional social structure"

=== Robin Kathleen Wright ===
Robin Kathleen Wright, another American art historian, built upon Kaufmann's thesis using Haida argillite pipes as a foundation. Wright contributed two elements to the study of argillite carving: she developed the idea that it was the introduction of tobacco pipes to the Northwest Coast that helped inspire the beginnings of argillite carving and successfully correlated Western influences on Haida culture and their effects on argillite style and imagery.

=== Wilson Duff: Sense and Non-Sense ===
Wilson Duff, a Canadian anthropologist, noted some problems with the aforementioned theories of progression in the styles and themes of Haida argillite carving. Duff reanalyzed the history of argillite carving and the existing theories concerning its influences and interpreted a timeline founded on what he calls "sense" and "non-sense". Instead of Kaufmann's three periods, Duff broke the history of argillite carving into four phases. He used Kaufmann's first three phases and added a fourth which he subsequently divided into two parts.

Duff's first period dates between the years 1800–1835. This is a "non-sense" period which is characterized by a lack of logical compositions of traditional Haida images or themes. According to Duff, these illogical representations in argillite are due to an unwillingness on the Haida's behalf to allow important elements of their culture to be owned by Europeans and Americans. Duff's second period is called "White Man’s Non-sense" and takes place between 1830 and 1865. This period is filled with argillite carvings depicting Europeans or Americans which are often carved using a more Western influenced style. This movement towards more Western styles and themes is potentially due to an increase in contact between the two cultures. There were also many mixed images and visual punning carried out during Duff's "Non-Sense" period. This "non-sense" theme is therefore also indicative of the Haida's ridicule of Western culture's seeming lack of rationality.

The depictions of Western culture increased and grew more detailed and elaborate during this period. By 1865 there are conventions in Haida depictions of Western style clothing, and a merging of traditional and Western methods of figure representation. The third period existed between 1865 and 1910. This "Haida sense" period represents a movement back to strongly traditional themes in argillite carving, most likely due to the population and culture decrease happening throughout Haida society at the time. Meaning is suddenly apparent in argillite carving, as are important Haida figures such as chiefs and shamans and sacred or religious themes. Haida myths begin to be represented in the carvings, the Bear-Mother myth being one of the most common myth themes that appear in this period. Duff sees this period as being an attempt by the Haida to record elements of their culture that were quickly being forgotten because of religious conversion or because of death. By 1910 the art of argillite carving was beginning to decline in conjunction with the continued loss of Haida individuals and culture. Duff's fourth period is composed of two phases and added to Kaufmann's original chronology. This period is entitled "Haida-Sense II" and existed between the years 1910–1981, making it the longest period in Duff's model. Many of the great Haida artists producing carvings in the third period died during the early years of the fourth period causing a lack of skilled carvers and a stall in the production of argillite carvings. This first phase of period four is what Duff calls "The Plateau Era". The plateau era is ended by a nationwide revitalization in the 1960s which occurred throughout Native American communities in order to revitalize the practice of traditional cultures. Aspiring argillite carvers looked to remaining older carvers, academia, museums and galleries for information on how to carve.

== Timeline synopsis ==
- 1820: Oval pipes and pipe panels are the most popular form created in argillite.
- 1830: The pipe panel configuration becomes more popular than the oval pipe form. This change is paralleled by a movement toward more Western-style images. Also, single figure pipes and Western-type pipes make an appearance at this time.
- 1840: Oval pipes are being produced less, while the pipe panel and panel forms have become common. Single figures now are generally representing American or European males.
- 1840–1860: Buyer preference for dishes, as well as flutes and other utensils.
- 1865: A large change in tradition occurs; totem poles and house posts begin to appear. This change begins a period of time where more traditional images make their way into argillite carving. Very few Western themed carvings are seen after this date.
- 1870: Continued increase in indigenous themes. The first flat house posts are seen, as well as free standing house posts which become more popular after 1875.
- 1880: Another increase in object types occurs around this date. Also making an appearance are multiple figure carvings which become most common during this time.
- 1890: A resurgence of the popularity of the pipe occurs, albeit with increased decoration. Individual single figure popularity also increases again. The totem pole model continues to be sought after at this time, a trend that continues to the present.
- 1900–1910: Steady production of the creation of figures and poles.
- 1910–1960: Most items manufactured are small (6 inches or less). Only a few artists are carving large pieces at this time. Poles are manufactured and sold to stores and galleries.
- 1960: Interest in Native American cultural revival causes an increase in argillite carving of all shapes and sizes.

== Haida argillite carvers ==
- Charles Edenshaw
- Bill Reid
- Claude Davidson

- Robert Davidson
- Reg Davidson

- Jay Simeon
- Gary Minaker Russ
- Rufus Moody
- Christian White
- Darrell White
- Tom Hans
- Pat McGuire

== Books ==
- Leslie Drew and Doug Wilson. Argillite: Art of the Haida. Surrey, B.C.: Hancock House, 2003. ISBN 978-0-88839-037-0
