= Terri-Lynn Williams-Davidson =

Haida lawyer, artist, activist, and author from Canada

Terri-Lynn Williams-Davidson KC
- Gid7ahl-Gudsllaay Lalaxaaygans
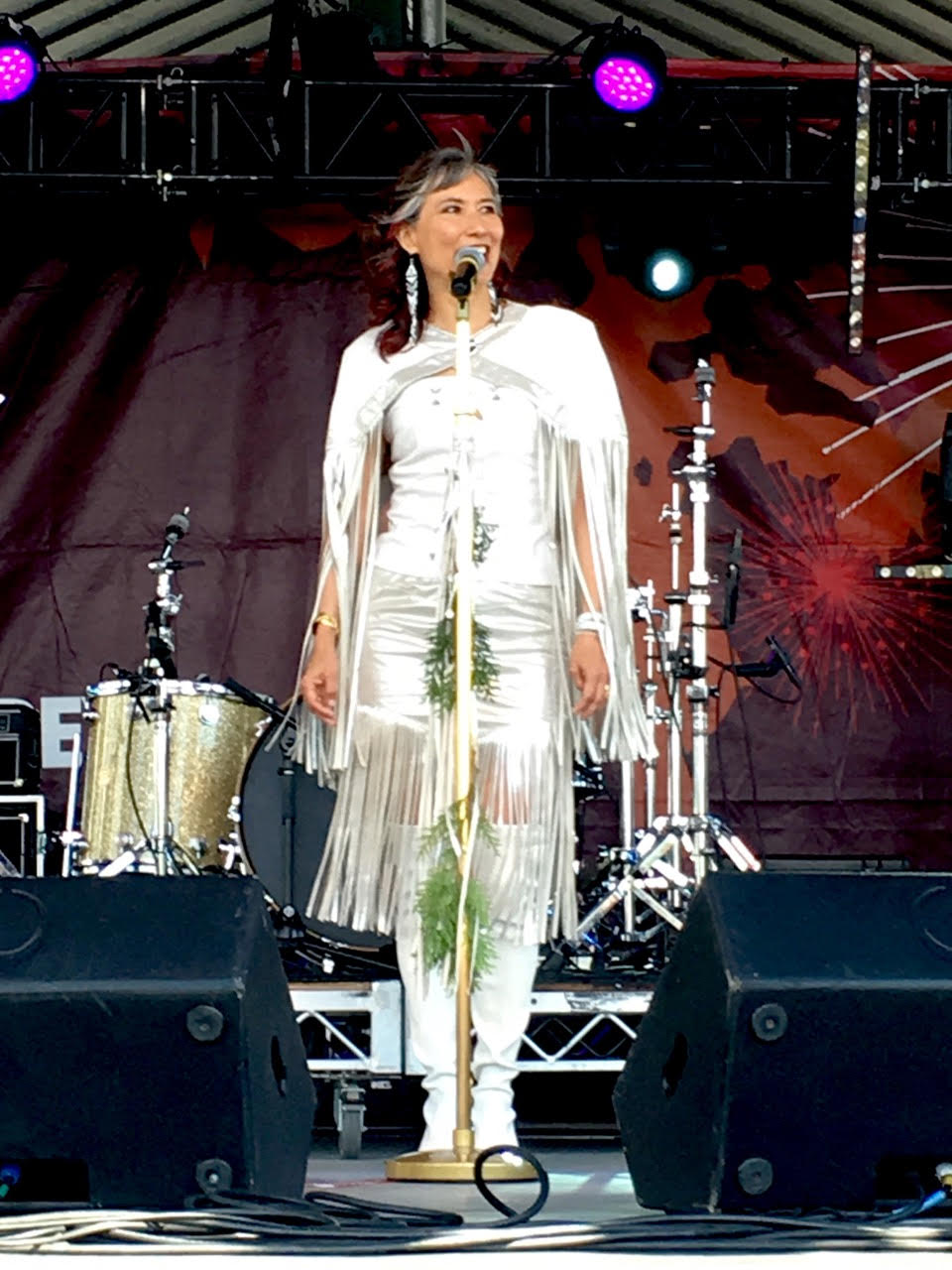
- Terri-Lynn Williams-Davidson performing July 1, 2019.
- Born: 1965 (age 60–61); Haida Gwaii
- Education: University of British Columbia (JD, PhD)
- Occupations: Lawyer, musician
- Spouse: Robert Davidson (artist)
- Website: https://www.ravencallingproductions.com/

Terri-Lynn Williams-Davidson KC (Haida: Gid7ahl-Gudsllaay Lalaxaaygans) is a Canadian First Nations lawyer, artist, activist, and author and a member of the Raven Clan from the Haida Nation. As a lawyer, Williams-Davidson specializes in Indigenous and environmental law, having represented the Haida Nation at all levels of court since 1996 and notably participating in the litigation of the Haida Nation's TFL39 Case to protect the old-growth forests of Haida Gwaii, a case that effectively altered the government's stance on the consultation and accommodation of Aboriginal Rights.

Williams-Davidson has also become an important figure in the preservation of Haida culture, using music and literature to revitalize the language and culture of Haida Gwaii. She has released four studio albums of Haida songs: 2008's Lalaxaaygans: Beautiful Sound, 2011's New Journeys, 2017's Grizzly Bear Town and 2025's Edge of the World as well as two books based on supernatural beings from ancient oral Haida narratives: Magical Beings of Haida Gwaii and Out of Concealment.

== Biography ==
Born and raised in Haida Gwaii, Williams-Davidson was given the name "Lalaxaaygans" Haida for "Beautiful Sound" by her maternal great-grandmother Susan Williams, who was a song custodian. The influence of her great-grandmother became apparent at the age of 6 when she first began singing in public. She began singing in Haida at 13 and soon after co-founded a children's dance group "Skidegate Haida Dancers" in 1978.

Williams-Davidson's academic career began with a degree in computer science, which she received from the University of British Columbia (UBC) in 1990. While pursuing a degree in law she spent the summer of 1993 working for the Haida Gwaii Museum, where she catalogued and researched southern songs of the Haida Nation. The following year, Williams-Davidson received the name "Gid7ahl-Gudsllaay" held by her great-grandmother Susan Williams.

Williams-Davidson completed her degree and graduated from UBC in 1995. She was called to the Bar of British Columbia the following year and founded EAGLE (Environment-Aboriginal Guardianship through Law and Education), a charity providing free legal aid to protect land.

In 1996, Williams-Davidson married Robert Davidson, a renowned Haida artist.

She is the cousin of Gidansda Guujaaw.

== Legal work ==
Williams-Davidson represents the Haida nation at all levels of court, and has done so since 1995. Her involvement in litigating the Haida Nation's TFL39 Case is of particular note, as it is considered the leading case on the consultation and accommodation of Aboriginal rights related to resource development. She has also helped win innovative interim agreements with British Columbia and Canada as counsel for the Haida Nation's Aboriginal title case. In September 2025, the BC Supreme Court pronounced an order recognizing the Haida Nation's Aboriginal title to the terrestrial areas of Haida Gwaii.

Williams-Davidson played a significant role as a member of the Haida Nation's legal team in their litigation against the approval of the Enbridge Pipeline project.

Through 2014 and 2015, Williams-Davidson represented the Haida Nation in litigation against the Department of Fisheries and Oceans, challenging the decision to open a commercial herring fishery in Haida Gwaii waters. In a ruling that is seen as a significant milestone in the use of Indigenous rights in the battle for environmental conservation, the court agreed with Williams-Davidson's case and granted an injunction which has kept commercial fisheries out of Haida waters ever since.

Williams-Davidson has published numerous works on aboriginal law and lectures all over the world. On top of founding EAGLE in 1996, Williams-Davidson has acted as an Advisory Council member of the Vancouver Foundation's Environment Program, as a Juror for the Ecotrust Canada Buffet Award for Indigenous Leadership and as a board member of Ecotrust Canada and the Earthlife Canada Foundation (Gowgaia Institute).

In May 2012, Williams-Davidson appeared on the cover of The Advocate, a journal published by the Vancouver Bar Association. Appearing on the cover is seen as a great milestone in a British Columbia lawyer's life. Williams-Davidson is one of only three Indigenous lawyers to have appeared on the cover, with the other two being former Lieutenant Governor Steven Point and Member of Parliament Jodi Wilson-Raybould.

In 2014, Williams-Davidson won the Peoples Choice Andrew Thompson award for her contributions in the fields of environmental and Aboriginal law.

== Art as cultural preservation ==
Having originally begun singing in Haida at 13, Williams-Davidson continues to immerse herself in the preservation and creation of Haida song and dance. In 1996, she joined the Rainbow Creek Dancers: a Haida dance group which performs traditional song and dance both in Haida Gwaii and around the world. She has been a member of the Haida Gwaii Singers society, a group that focuses on educating people on the rich musical traditions of the Haida, since 2000. In 2009, the group released the Songs of Haida Gwaii Archival Anthology, a 7 CD box set featuring recordings dating back as far back as the early 1900s. Williams-Davidson volunteered as Executive Producer, researcher, writer and fundraiser for the project which digitized all locatable songs from Haida Gwaii, a massively ambitious project that resulted in the preservation of over 450 Haida songs. Williams-Davidson won a "Keeper of Traditions" award at the Canadian Aboriginal Music Awards for her work on the project.

Williams-Davidson released her first solo album "Lalaxaaygans: Beautiful Sound" in 2008. The record was part of the Haida Gwaii Singers Contemporary Anthology, a collection of contemporary records composed of ancient Haida songs performed by members of the Haida Gwaii Singers society. The album won her the "Best Female Traditional/Cultural Roots" award at the 2009 Canadian Aboriginal Music Awards.

In 2011, Williams-Davidson released her second solo album New Journeys. The album featured guitars, piano, cello and percussion, creating a fusion between cultures that hadn't been previously explored in Haida music, which is traditionally sung without melodic accompaniment. While the songs are predominantly contemporary, they are sung in Haida and in many cases abide by traditional Haida song structures, with many of the pieces featuring only three notes. The album was released to high acclaim and netted Williams-Davidson a number of awards including a Canadian Aboriginal Music Award and a Western Canadian Music Awards nomination.

Williams-Davidson released her third album Grizzly Bear Town in 2017. The record featured instrumentation and vocals from Chilliwack's Bill Henderson and Claire Lawrence and continued to develop on Williams-Davidson's concept of fusing the Haida language with contemporary lyrics and arrangements. The album's name Grizzly Bear Town is another name for Skedans, the birth village of her maternal great-grandmother, Susan Williams. Her fourth record, Edge of the World, also featuring collaborators Bill Henderson and Claire Lawrence, was released in August of 2025.

In 2017, Williams-Davidson wrote Out of Concealment, a book of surreal photo montages that celebrate the female supernatural beings of Haida oral tradition.

In 2019, Williams-Davidson, alongside her stepdaughter Sara Florence Davidson, published a children's book titled Magical Beings of Haida Gwaii which features ten supernatural beings of ancient Haida storytelling and presents them in a visual medium that engages children and teaches them empowering and meaningful examples of living in balance with nature.

Following a request by elders of the Skidegate Haida Immersion Program, Williams-Davidson created Haida Solstice, a limited-edition album of christmas classics reimagined through Haida culture. The project was released in 2023 and was made in collaboration with her group sGaanaGwa.

In 2025, Williams-Davidson and husband Robert Davidson won the BC & Yukon book prizes for their 2024 book A Haida Wedding, which documents the events of their 1996 traditional Haida wedding ceremony, the first to take place in over a century.

Williams-Davidson is also the creator of the Haida Box of Knowledge, an Oracle Deck of 34 cards featuring Haida Gwaii's female supernatural beings. The cards also feature art by Robert Davidson and share the knowledge and wisdom attributed to each of the female figures passed down through traditional Haida oral narratives.
