= Primrose Adams =

Canadian First Nations artist (1925–2020)

- Born: 1926; Masset, Haida Gwaii
- Died: January 2020 (aged 93–94)
- Citizenship: Haida Nation and Canada
- Known for: hats and baskets
- Awards: British Columbia Creative Lifetime Achievement Award for First Nations' Art

Primrose Adams (1926 – January 2020) was a Canadian First Nations artist and member of the Raven Clan from the Haida nation. She wove hats and baskets in the Haida method and is most notable for her spruce root basketry, which involves working in the traditional manner of collecting and dyeing her own spruce root. Adams died in January 2020.

== Personal life and family ==
As the granddaughter of Haida artists Charles Edenshaw (1839–1920) and Isabella Edenshaw (1842–1926) and the daughter of Haida artists Florence Davidson and Robert Davidson, Adams comes from a family of Haida artists. After marrying her husband, Victor, Adams learned the art of basket-weaving from her mother-in-law, Haida artist Selina Peratrovich (1890–1984), starting in 1977. Adams' daughter, Isabel Rorick (born 1955) is also a weaver, carrying on a family tradition now spanning five generations.

== Career and achievements ==
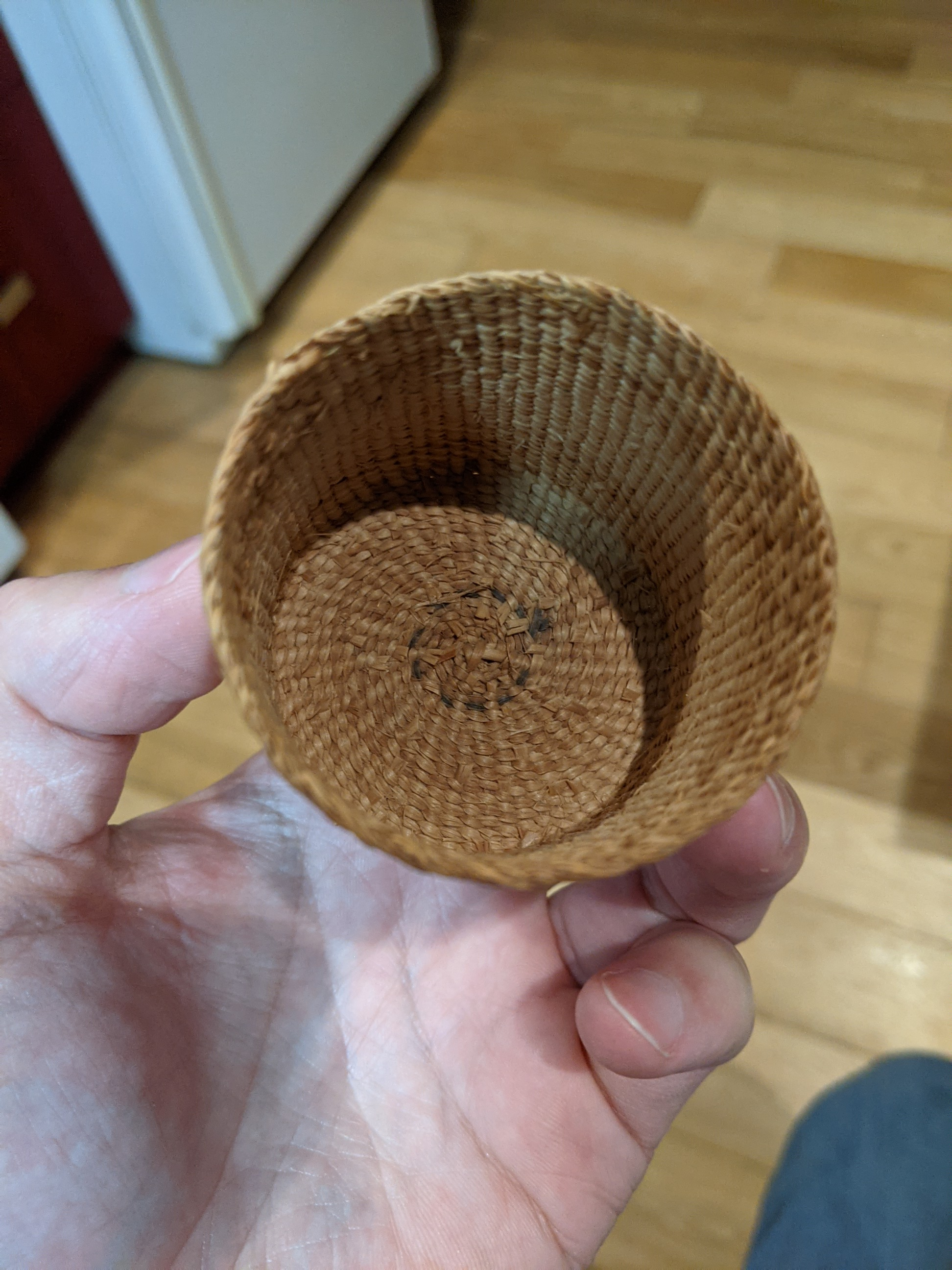
Miniature spruce root basket by Primrose Adams showing her characteristic dark inner ring signature

Adams' work resides in several public collections, including the Field Museum in Chicago, the Museum of Anthropology at UBC in Vancouver, the Douglas Reynolds Gallery in Vancouver, British Columbia, and the Lattimer Gallery in Vancouver, British Columbia. In 1981 Adams wove a hat for her nephew, distinguished Haida artist Robert Davidson. Davidson honored Adams in return in his diptych The Seven Ravens, which depicted ravens representing his seven aunts, including Adams. Adam was acknowledged by Davidson again in his Fifty Years of Haida Weaving: The Robert Davidson Collection exhibition in 2009.

Adams was included in Sharon J. Busby's 2003 Spruce-Root Baskets of the Haida and Tlingit, a nonfiction book about Haida and Tlingit traditional craft. In 2005, Adams featured in the Changing Hands: Art Without Reservation 2 exhibition at the Museum of Arts and Design in New York City, New York. 2006 found Adams' work presented at the Vancouver Art Gallery's Raven Travelling: Two Centuries of Haida Art exhibition.

The 2010/2011 exhibition Signed Without Signature: Works by Charles and Isabella Edenshaw at the UBC Museum of Anthropology attested to the artistic strength of Adams' ancestors, and she and three other matrilineal descendants of the Edenshaws attended its opening.

In 2011 Adams was awarded the British Columbia Creative Lifetime Achievement Award for First Nations' Art. In 2017, she is set to be featured in the Xi xanya dzam exhibition at the Bill Reid Gallery of Northwest Coast Art, which will display works by recipients of the British Columbia Creative Lifetime Achievement Award for First Nations' Art from 2007 to 2016.
