= Kornasian Bathhouse =

National heritage site in Dezful, Iran

Kornasian bathhouse
- حمام کرناسیان (Persian); حمام کرناسیون (Persian)
- Haj Nasir Bath; New bathhouse
- Interactive map of Kornasian bathhouse
- Type: Bathhouse

History
- Built: Zand dynasty
- Built for: Qajar dynasty
- Rebuilt: 1903 to 2006 * (۱۲۸۲ to ۱۳۸۵ shamsi date)

Site notes
- Architect: Master Moizi
- Restored: yes
- Current use: museum of anthropology
- Owner: Cultural Heritage, Handicrafts and Tourism Organization of Iran

Kornasian bathhouse Persian: حمام کرناسیان dates to the Qajar era and is located south of the Kornasian neighbourhood in Dezful, Iran. This bathhouse is listed in the National Iranian Heritage List with the number 8477.

== Renaming ==
The Kornasian bathhouse was renamed in 2006 by the Cultural Heritage, Handicrafts and Tourism Organization of Iran and is now known as the Museum of Anthropology in Dezful.

== Fire in the bathroom ==
The Kornasian Bathroom was set on fire on Monday, 28 March 2016. The Dezful County Fire Department's chief executive declared it was a technical problem in the electrical system. He said that the fire had not spread to the interior of the historic bath. It suffered smoke and power outages. The bathroom reopened on 2 April 2016.

== Other names ==
This monument was also known in the past by other names such as the Haj Nasir bathhouse Persian: حمام حاج نصیر and the New bathhouse Persian: حمام نو.

== Reasons for naming ==
The reason for the renaming of the Haj Nasir bath into the Kornasian Bathroom was that the nomads who migrated from the Korna Mountains to the area later became their place of residence.

== See also ==
- Cultural Heritage, Handicrafts and Tourism Organization of Iran
