= Charles Edenshaw =

Haida artist (1839–1920)

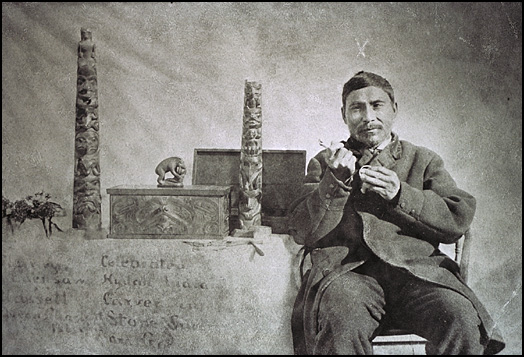
- Edenshaw and carvings
- Born: c. 1839; Skidegate, Haida Gwaii
- Died: 1920 (aged 80–81)
- Occupation: Artist
- Known for: Woodcarver; argillite carver; jewellery maker; painter

Charles Edenshaw (c. 1839–1920) was a Haida artist from Haida Gwaii, British Columbia. He is known for his woodcarving, argillite carving, jewellery, and painting. His style was known for its originality and innovative narrative forms, created while adhering to the principles of formline art characteristic of Haida art. In 1902, the ethnographer and collector Charles F. Newcombe called Edenshaw “the best carver in wood and stone now living.”

== Early life and family ==
Edenshaw (whose name was also spelled Edensaw, or Edenso from the Haida chiefly name Idɨnsaw) was born at the Haida village of Skidegate, on Haida Gwaii, located 27 miles off of the coast of British Columbia Canada. His father was K'łajangk'una of the Nikwən Qiwe lineage of the Raven moiety. His mother, whose lineage identity he followed in the Haida matrilineal system, was Qawkúna (later Mrs. John Robson) of the Eagle moiety's Sdəłdás lineage, of which Charles eventually became chief. He spent his early years at Kiusta and Yatza in northwestern Haida Gwaii.

His chiefly name was Idɨnsaw; his Haida name was Da.a xiigang alternatively spelled Da•axiigang (Dahʼégɨn), and Tahaygen, Tahayren and Tahayghen, meaning “Noise in the Housepit”. As an infant, Edenshaw was also given the names N∂ngkwigetklałs (Nəngkwigetklałs) (“They Gave Ten Potlatches for Him”) and Skɨl'wxan jas ("Fairies Coming to You as in a Big Wave"). His parents were able to potlatch extensively, indicating that they were prosperous and held considerable influence in their community. As was customary, Da•axiigang was tattooed at these ceremonies; his daughter Florence Davidson recalled eagle, seawolf, and frog tattoos on his on his back, arms, legs, chest, and hands. Da•axiigang's father was known as an expert canoe maker; while he died when Da•axiigang was a boy, it is likely that he gave his son instruction in woodcarving.

At age 18, c 1857, Da•axiigang moved to the Haida Gwaii village of Masset to live with his uncle, the Sdast’aas Eagle chief Albert Edward Edenshaw (Eda’nsa) (1810-1894), an ironworker, coppersmith, jewellery-maker, and woodcarver who taught his nephew all of these skills. When Eda’nsa married his second wife, he adopted her niece K’woiy∂ng (Yahgujanaas); when she came of age, c. 1873, she and Da•axiigang were married. On 27 Dec. 1885, they were baptized, naming themselves Charles and Isabella, after European nobility (as had Albert). They were then remarried in church, which is when Albert gave Da•axiigang the name Edenshaw. The couple settled in a house in Masset. They had eleven children, four of whom survived to adulthood: Florence, Emily (White), Agnes (Yeltatzie), and Nora (Cogo). Through Emily, Edenshaw is great-grandfather to the contemporary artists Michael Nicoll Yahgulanaas, Jim Hart and Lisa Hageman Yahgulanaas. Through Florence, he is great-grandfather to the famed artists Robert Davidson, and Reg Davidson, grandfather to the weaving artist Primrose Adams, and great-grandfather to the weaving artist Isabel Rorick. Through his sister, he is also great-great uncle to renowned contemporary artist Bill Reid.

== As an artist ==
According to Florence, Edenshaw began carving argillite and silver when he was about 14. While the carving of argillite was initiated by other Haida artists as early as 1820, Edenshaw was the first to carve in precious metals. It is assumed that his work pre-1880 included poles, masks, frontlets, chests, and feast dishes, which was the range of Haida art made for ceremonial use. Six full-sized poles were attributed to Edenshaw; two have since been determined to have been the work of his uncle.

By the time of his marriage, Edenshaw was making a living from his art, with his most productive period being 1880-1910. His main workspace was a back yard shed; after his children were grown, he worked in the house. He spent many winters working in Victoria, British Columbia. In the summer months, he and his family traveled to places such as Port Essington, British Columbia, Fort Simpson, Juneau, Alaska, Kasaan, Alaska and Ketchikan, Alaska, where he would create and sell his pieces; Isabella would make and sell baskets and work in the canneries.

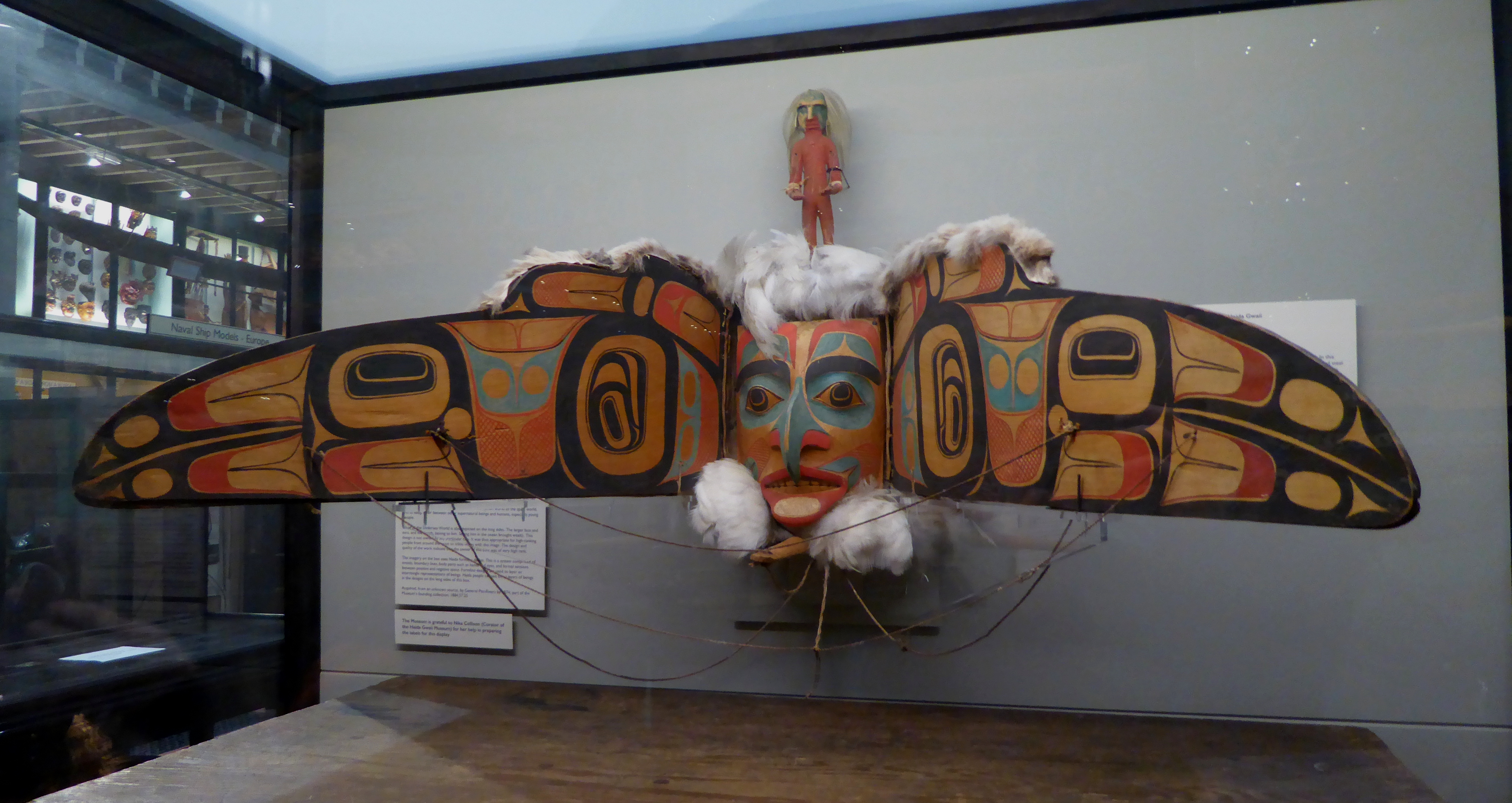
A Raven Transformation Mask, produced by Edenshaw in the 1880s. Now in possession of the Pitt Rivers Museum in University of Oxford.

Edenshaw's silver and gold pieces were likely made for use by the Haida people, as were carved wooden settees, cradles and tombstones. Everything else was made for sale to outsiders. These carvings included poles, chests, bowls, and platters in wood and argillite, and wooden masks, bentwood boxes, rattles, canes, model canoes and frontlets. He also painted designs on baskets, basketry hats and plaques made for sale by Isabella. George Cunningham’s store in Port Essington sold their work; collectors came to their home.

He produced many commissioned works, including for the American Museum of Natural History, and served as consultant to anthropologists. His work was collected by the anthropologists Franz Boas and John R. Swanton.

In 1927, the National Gallery of Canada produced The Exhibition of West Coast Art, which marked the first time that Edenshaw's work was formally identified as 'fine art'; he was placed in the same rank as Emily Carr, Paul Kane and A. Y. Jackson. The major collections of Edenshaw’s work are at the American Museum of Natural History, the Field Museum of Natural History, the Royal British Columbia Museum, the Museum of Anthropology at UBC, the Canadian Museum of History, and Oxford University's Pitt Rivers Museum.

Edenshaw was featured on the Haida Northwest Indian Heritage dollar issued in 1977.
