= Isabella Edenshaw =

Haida basketweaver

Isabella Edenshaw (c. 1842 – 1926) was a First Nations basket weaver who lived in Haida Gwaii. She was given this name by an Anglican priest when she was married. She is also known by the Haida names K'woiyeng, Yahgujanaas and S'itkwuns. Some sources list her birth year as 1858.

== Family and personal life ==
She was born in Klinkwan Village, Alaska, a member of the Yakulanas lineage of the Haida clan. Although she was an only child, her parents adopted a slave girl named Wiba as a playmate for Isabella. Her parents died of smallpox when she was young and she was raised by chief Albert Edward Edenshaw.

Around 1873, Isabella was wed to Charles Edenshaw in a traditional Haida ceremony. After converting to Christianity, they were married again in an Anglican service on December 27, 1885. The ceremony took place at St John's Church in Masset. Isabella's aunt and uncle Albert and Amy Edenshaw were married in the same ceremony, along with nine other couples.

Charles inherited a traditional plank house from his uncle and built a Victorian style home located in Masset. Isabella and Charles kept a large grizzly bear mortuary pole in the front yard that honoured Isabella's grandmother's sister. Together they had eleven children; Robert, Emily, George, Agnes, Florence, Nora, Alice, and four others that died in infancy. Their daughter Florence Davidson became a prominent Canadian artist. Their son Robert drowned in a swimming accident.

Isabella's family only resided in Masset during the late fall, winter, and May. For the rest of the year their family travelled around the province. At the end of February, they travelled to Kung (the site of an old village in Naden Harbour) where they would camp for a month to collect and dry halibut. This could be kept for eating or be traded by the family. In June they migrated to the mainland where Isabella worked at the Inverness Cannery in New Kasaan. Here she would purchase material for her family's winter wardrobe. They stayed here until late summer, when they returned to the islands. During this time Isabella and Florence collected huckleberries, crab-apples, salal berries, cranberries, and potatoes.

== Artistic career ==
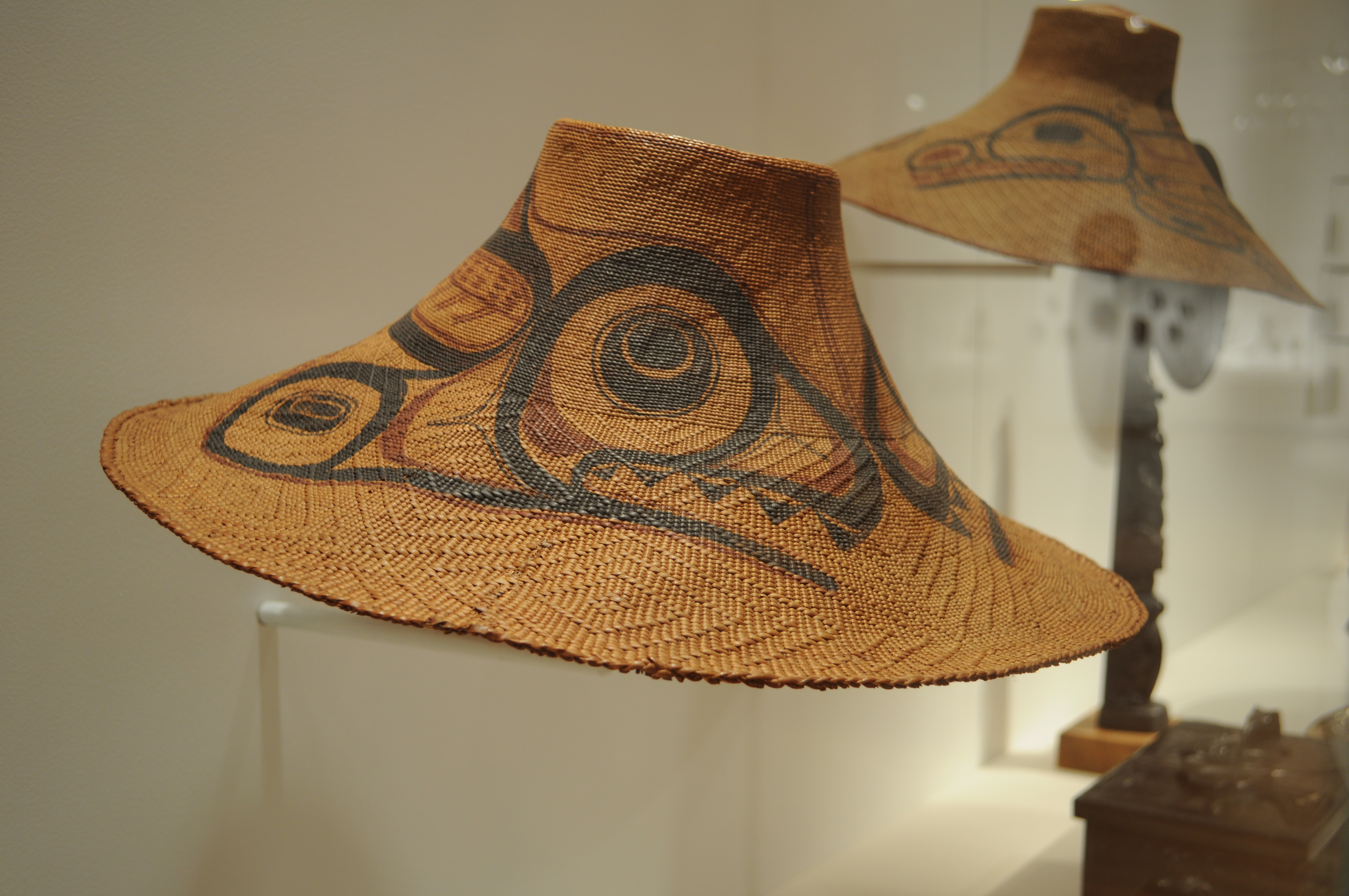
Haida Hat, 1895, Isabella Edenshaw, spruce root and paint, Canadian Museum of Civilization.

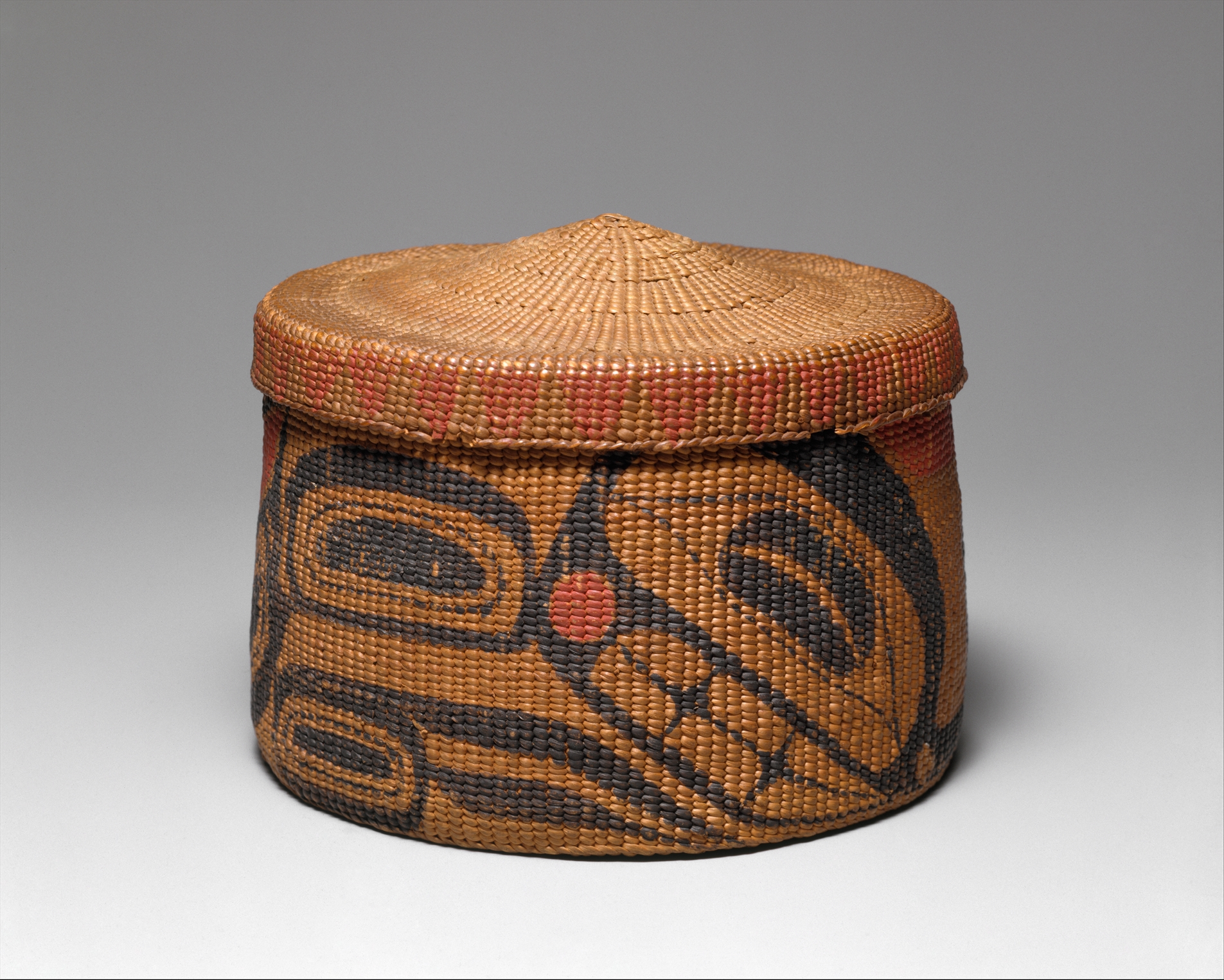
Lidded Basket, 1905, Isabella Edenshaw, spruce root and paint

Isabella wove spruce roots into baskets and hats which were later painted by her husband. She frequently travelled to North Beach with her daughter Florence to collect spruce roots for her weaving. The distinctive qualities of her art have been recorded as such:

"Seen in the appearance of the "mamastiki" [concentric diamonds] motif in conjunction with four-ply twining (especially S-twining) at the perimeter of the top, the absence of special demarcation at the lower perimeter of the crown, and the use of four-strand braid...as brim finish when, and this is essential, the construction of the top, crown, and brim of the hat is in accord with the standard Haida formula (Laforet 1990: 295)."

Their records of her known artworks are as follows: 31 hats, 7 mats, and 7 baskets. Of the hats attributed to Isabella and Charles, 10 are decorated with frogs, 9 with ravens, 4 with sharks, 3 with whales, 1 with a beaver, 1 with a hawk, 1 with a sculpin, 1 with a long-beaked bird, 1 with a sea lion. Of the mats, 3 are decorated with sea lions, 1 with halibut, 1 with sculpin, 1 with mosquito, 1 with a bear. Of the baskets there are 2 decorated with Wasgo figures, 1 with a whale, 1 with a beaver on the outside and salmon on the inside, 1 with a frog, 1 with a whale and frog, and 1 with a bird.

During Isabella's annual travels to mainland British Columbia, she would sell her baskets and hats at George Cunningham's store in Port Essington. In 1902, Charles F. Newcombe purchased a spruce root cradle-liner painted with a dogfish design and several baskets from Isabella.

Her work appeared in the exhibitions Raven Travelling: Two Centuries of Haida Art at the Vancouver Art Gallery and Signed Without Signature at the British Columbia Museum of Anthropology. Her woven baskets and hats are included in the collections of the McCord Museum, the National Gallery of Canada, and the BC Museum of Anthropology.
