= Jay Simeon =

Canadian artist of Haida heritage

Jay Simeon (also known as Dig Wee Gay T’aaw and Apah Gyiyo, born July 27, 1976) is a Haida and Blackfoot artist.

== Biography ==
Simeon was born to father Eric Simeon and mother Leonora Yellow Horn in Fort McLeod, Alberta. He was born into the Kaawaas branch of the Sdast’a.aas Eagle clan. His crests are Eagle, Supernatural Killer Whale, Frog, Beaver, and Raven. At the age of eight he moved to Vancouver, British Columbia to be raised by his father, Eric Simeon.

Simeon has been practicing Haida art since the age of 14 when he began studying the fundamentals of Haida design with his aunt, Sharon Hitchcock.

Simeon completed an advanced design course at Vancouver Community College and studied advanced design with Robert Davidson at the Vancouver Aboriginal Friendship Centre. He has been included in every major gallery exhibit featuring Haida artworks held since 2003 at leading galleries in Vancouver, BC and Seattle, WA. His art spans a variety of media including wood, argillite, silver, gold and silkscreen prints.

Simeon's work has been featured in the exhibition Raven Travelling at the Vancouver Art Gallery in 2006, the largest Haida exhibition in recent years. His work is also in the permanent collection of the Burke Museum of Natural History and Culture, Seattle, WA. His most recent creation of note being a grand piano painted with one of his designs, especially for the Olympics; the paint used was infused with the dust of argillite from Haida Gwaii.
