= Marcia Crosby =

Canadian writer, art historian, and educator

- Born: British Columbia, Canada
- Citizenship: Canadian
- Occupation: Art historian

Marcia Crosby is a Canadian writer, art historian, and educator.

== Background ==
Maria Violet Crosby is of Tsimshian and Haida ancestry, originating from Metlakatla, Alaska, and Gisbutwaada (Killer Whale clan), and House of Gitlan. Born and raised in her maternal grandmother's territory, Marcia grew up on what is now Prince Rupert. She has a Bachelor of Arts in Fine Arts and English (1990), a Master of Arts, "Indian Art/Aboriginal Title" in Cultural History (1993), and a Doctorate of Philosophy in Art History, all from the University of British Columbia. Her MA thesis focused on the tension between representations of Aboriginal cultures and peoples in the public sphere, the work of Indigenous art and artists, and representations of Aboriginal title in British Columbia. Crosby's PhD dissertation is on, ‘self-identifying modern Indian artists.’ Crosby started teaching English literature and First Nations Studies at Vancouver Island University in 1996 (previously Malaspina College). Crosby has worked as a researcher, reviewing Aboriginal programs in public institutions. Crosby's works in literature and curatorial practices have continually interrogated mainstream representations and the historical narratives of First Nations peoples and cultures.

== Curatorial practice ==
Crosby was a guest curator and writer for the Contemporary Art Gallery's exhibition "Nations in Urban Landscape" (1994). This exhibit toured to Oboro, Montreal in 1996. Shelley Niro, Faye HeavyShield and Eric Robertson are some of the artists referenced in her, "Nations in Urban Landscape" exhibition catalogue. In "Nations in Urban Landscape" Crosby investigates the geo-political discourse between Canadian and First Nations governments over the land issues that have shaped cultural practices in museums and galleries.

Starting in 2008, Crosby began participating in the web project, "Ruins in Progress: Vancouver Art in the Sixties" in association with the Morris and Helen Belkin Art Gallery. Included on this site is an essay by Crosby titled, "Making Indian Art ‘Modern’" where Crosby writes, "What complicates any exploration of this historical stage is the situation in which artists and others struggled to become modern. Before the mid1960s, there was no sustained economic or/and institutional or private support from patrons (including collectors of contemporary aboriginal art), nor an established intellectual discourse to create value for ‘modern Indian’ art." Crosby writes about George Clutesi, Henry Speck, David Neel and others and their vision to be modern integrated artists during the sixties. Crosby explains that because of their art practices there was an invocation of upward social mobility which succeeded in integrating the formalist discourse of Northwest coast ‘fine art’ into both museum and art galleries, which paradoxically eclipsed many these early artists and their histories. Crosby's work for this website was the first step in framing her PhD dissertation. Since 2001, Crosby has written on contemporary art history topics as diverse as the myth of Bill Reid, the sculptural works of Dina Gomez, an Argentinian artist living and working in Vancouver, and aboriginal performance art, which included two published essays on the multi-media works of Rebecca Belmore.

In 2012, Crosby acted as a co-curated with Karen Duffek at the Vancouver Belkin and Satellite Gallery's show, "The Paintings of Henry Speck: Udz’stalis." Henry Speck (1908-1971) is a kwakwaka’waka artist who became a "newly discovered phenomenon" in 1964, when his paintings of masked dancers, coastal creatures, and sea monsters were shown at Vancouver's New Design Gallery. Marcia Crosby is introduced in the exhibition excerpt as a writer, scholar, and PhD candidate, UBC Department of Art History, Visual Art, and Theory). In the exhibition catalogue "Projections: The Paintings of Henry Speck, Udzi’stalis" Karen Duffek, and Marcia Crosby have a formal dialogue where they discuss Specks place in "Indian art" history. Crosby states, "I don’t think Speck and his work ‘slipped away’ so much as the genealogy of ‘modern art’ by Aboriginal artists cannot account for such qualities as their traditional, metaphysical referents, or their seemingly positivist focus on form."

In July 2013, Crosby held a "Feedback" talk for the Contemporary Art Gallery (Vancouver) in response to Itee Pootoogook's exhibit "Buildings and Lands". Pootogook's exhibition included a series of large-scale graphite and coloured pencil drawings depicting images of modern northern life distinctly different from the accustomed historical images seen in Inuit work. Instead of traditional subjects such as igloos and parka-clad hunters, Pootogook shows her audience everyday works, one made up of recognizable contemporary accouterments including snowmobiles, boats, soft drinks, and television sets. Crosby's formal discussion on the Pootogook's exhibit heavily reflected upon some of the aspects researched and developed in her PhD. Crosby writes in her thesis, "Setting up cultural institution in the heroic position of saviors of First Nations cultures bypasses the more important issue of addressing how that ‘need’ was created in the first place. Certainly, it can be stated that many First Nations individuals and communities today recognize that accessing the information recorded by ethnographers, anthropologists, archeologists, political scientists, art historians and curators is very important to filling in the historical gaps in local knowledge- which exist because of the many colonialist projects for assimilation and cultural genocide...Who benefits from whom is a historically specific and complex question." Crosby’s Feedback at the Contemporary Art Gallery included a focus on the formation of Aboriginal cultural production in urban spaces in Vancouver, B.C., for Native and non-Native publics. More specifically, Crosby focuses on the diverse forms of performativity, the display and sale of Aboriginally produced objects, and urban community supports by well-known First Nations artists through their association with new Aboriginal social organizations.

== Construction of the Imaginary Indian ==
An important work by Marcia Crosby is her "Construction of the Imaginary Indian" an essay included in Janet Giltrow book, Academic Reading, second edition: Reading and Writing Across the Disciplines. In the text, Crosby makes clear her goal to analyze the current state and recent phenomenon in the arts and social sciences where an embracing of 'difference' is taking place. Crosby makes transparent her experiences at university and the importance of the trials and tribulations she faced. She writes:

At the time, I felt only the discomfort of being wedged between the limits of who my professor thought I was and what that person was capable of accomplishing. As I continued studying the Euro-Canadian interaction with First Nations people, both in the visual arts and in literature, I saw a composite, singular ‘Imaginary Indian’ who functioned as a peripheral but necessary component of Europeans’ history in North America - the negative space of the ‘positive’ force of colonialist hegemony.

The 'Imaginary Indian' is a fictionalization of past and present cultures by the west and Crosby elaborates on this throughout her essay. Crosby shapes an argument focused on the precautions about western historizing indigenous people as illusory and an inscribing in past cultures a need to be saved through colonization and civilization. However, "Construction of the Imaginary Indian" does not take a primarily negative stance. In fact, Crosby writes about how the interest in aboriginal culture, in turn, created a space for native people to enter the art arena, which has in part provided a forum for many First Nations people to speak to current social and political issues. During her four years at university, Crosby studied and researched individuals who supposedly presented positive images of native people including: Paul Kane, Emily Carr, and Bill Reid.

As one of the less than one per cent of First Nations students who attend post-secondary institutions, Crosby found a collection of artists whose work prompted images of past cultures. Emily Carr and her retrospective at the National Gallery of Canada in the summer of 1990 is a major focus in "Construction of the Imaginary Indian." Crosby points out that Carr paints the remaining traces of Indian culture such as totem poles and canoes. This artistic decision on Carr's behalf speaks to what Crosby interprets as an ambition to record others. In her text, Crosby questions this further by interrogating the subjects in Emily Carr's paintings. Crosby writes, "Carr paid a tribute to the Indians she 'loved'" but who were they?" "The Construction of the Imaginary Indian" argues Carr's paintings can be seen as a recording of relics or ethnographic depictions. In Crosby's eyes, Carr was searching for a Canadian identity and also recognition for acting honorably. Crosby writes, "At this time, when the struggles of First Nations people for aboriginal rights and self-identity are being widely publicized, it is inappropriate, I think, for an art historian to describe Carr’s remarks as a 'statement of high moral purpose.'" Carr is not alone is being perceived by art historians this way, Paul Kane’s work and reception by the public is also unpacked in Crosby’s essay.

In "Construction of the Imaginary Indian" Crosby writes that Paul Kane’s texts and images reflect nineteenth-century philosophical, religious and political views about indigenous peoples. Crosby adds, Kane’s 'historical documents' have transcended time with a message that is still embraced by some art historians and government officials. However, Kane's work today can be read as a detriment of First Nations people because his work became a rationale for denying aboriginal rights, because according to Kane being Indian meant being a savage. Clearly, Crosby finds Kane's claims of authenticity problematic. Paul Kane was committed to making journals in the hopes that they would become intrinsic or essential in value for historians. Crosby states that when a culture is represented as going through fatal changes, the natural thing to do is salvage or save it. "Construction of the Imaginary Indian" sheds light on the fact that Kane's’ success depended on the inevitable death of a primitive people and industrial's fascination with such individuals. Bill Reid's work moves slightly away from acting like a recording or documenting, when compared to Kane's journals.

Bill Reid is introduced in Crosby's text as a central figure in this revival of Indian art. Crosby introduces Bill Reid as a Haida artist who took part in the so-called renaissance of Northwest Coast Indian art. Crosby writes, "In this vein, others besides Reid have been cited as saviors of native culture." In "Construction of the Imaginary Indian" the media's response to marginalized cultures within the postwar context is made central. In reciprocation to the publicizing of the apparent hardships of a culture there is a general global cry for decolonization and independence for non-Western nations (280). Reid has stated he: "wants to be taken on his own, engaged in the making of art, not Indian art." In her text, Crosby responds to this by commenting on political meaning behind his supposed autonomous art practice. Crosby writes, "Reid has actively supported the myth of the imminent death of the Indian, by identifying himself as hero and cultural saviour." Reid's work follows a rubric that promotes the dominant culture's assumption that is not only their obligation but their right to assume the responsibility of caring for a dying culture, that within the museum setting, becomes a homogeneous collection of Indian artifacts. Crosby writes, "The Indian was neatly contained within the institutional glass case, carefully locked away as a repository for the unthinkable or unspeakable parts of those who created it." Reid's work like Carr and Kane reinforces the myth of the artist while also underlining a culture's apparent helplessness.

In "Construction of the Imaginary Indian", Crosby includes a list of the individuals who have contributed to her conclusions on the 'Imaginary Indian.' Crosby writes, "However, the critical and protesting voices of Linda Nochlin, Heather Dawkins, Edward Said, Terry Goldie, Trinh T. Minh-ha, Marnie Fleming, James Clifford, Virgina Dominguez and many others confirmed the legitimacy of my discomfort at the disparity between what was imagined, written or said, and what was implied In "Manifest Matters", Gerald Vizenor writes, "The postindian warriors hover at last over the ruins of tribal representations and surmount the scriptures of manifest manners with new stories; these warriors counter the surveillance and literature of dominance with their own simulations of survivance." Crosby does more than 'collect and display Indians as objects' as human specimens rather her writing speaks to a personal experience and personal connection with past and present cultures with a sensitivity that is supported by dedicating years to building upon an education. Included in Wendy Stewart, Audrey Huntley and Fay Blaney's The Implication of Restorative Justice for Aboriginal Women (2001) is a quotation by Marcia Crosby:

I can hardly speak your words because I think you might not forgive me for telling the story you wanted kept a secret. Yes, some of our leaders, some of our old people and others on our communities want us to be quiet about life on our social and geographical reserves. They want us to be silent and if we are not we are not family. But your silence deadened me gram. This is about love and anger. This is about sadness and joy. About strength and total collapse of the spirit.

== Publications ==
- "Vancouver Anthology: The Institutional Politics of Art", ed. Stan Douglas (Vancouver: Talon Books, 1991)
- "Indian Art/ Aboriginal Title", UBC Ciricle (Vancouver: 1994)
- "Construction of the Imaginary Indian." Janet Giltrow (Peterborough, Ontario: 2002)
- "Group of Seven in Western Canada", ed. Cathy Mastin (Calgary: Key Porter Books, 2002)
- "Emily Carr: New Perspectives on a Canadian Icon", ed. Thom et al. (Ottawa: Douglas & McIntyre, 2006)
- "Ruins in Process: Vancouver Art in the Sixties", (Vancouver 2008)
- "Projections: The Paintings of Henry Speck, Udzi’stalis", Satellite Gallery (Vancouver: 2012)
