= Wendy Todd =

American geomicrobiologist

- Education: Oregon Health and Science University Portland State University Portland Community College
- Scientific career
- Fields: Geomicrobiology Traditional ecological knowledge
- Workplaces: University of Alaska Southeast University of Minnesota, Duluth Michigan State University
- Thesis: Biomineralization in extreme iron and manganese depositing environments (2015)
- Doctoral advisor: Antonio Baptista

Wendy F. K’ah Skaahluwaa Todd (née Smythe) is an American geomicrobiologist known for her work to increase Native American representation in STEM field. She is Alaska Native Haida and holds the position of assistant professor of Indigenous Science and occupational endorsement at the University of Alaska Southeast.

== Early life and education ==
Todd is Alaska Native Haida from the Xáadas (Haida) clan of Sdast’ aas (Fish Egg House). She spent the early years of her childhood in Hydaburg, Alaska before moving to Ketchikan, Alaska in her teens.

Todd received her bachelors degree in microbiology in 2001 & B.S. in science with a minor in geology in 2004 from Portland State University (PSU). In 2015, Todd received her doctorate in Oceanography/Environmental Science & Estuary & Ocean Systems from Oregon Health and Sciences University.

She did her post-doctoral research at Michigan State University, 2015-2017, in the NSF STC BEACON Center mentored by Dr. Judi Brown Clarke. After Which she was selected to do a two-year AAAS ST&P Fellowship at the National Science Foundation in the directorates of Education & Geosciences.

== Contributions ==
Todd has worked to increase Native American representation in the STEM field by pairing Western science with traditional ecological knowledge (TEK) and facilitating the cross-cultural exchange of knowledge in the development of science curriculum. Todd is committed to this cross-cultural knowledge for the benefit of Indigenous students, that students would be able to integrate Traditional Knowledge with Western academia rather than feel compelled to sacrifice one of their knowledge systems in order to honor the other. This bridging of knowledge systems guides Indigenous students in their navigation of differing cultural worldviews and philosophies, and fosters a more convergent educational experience. Through the geoscience education program in Hydaburg, Alaska, which she founded in 2007, Todd’s work has facilitated a significant increase in the number of Indigenous students who opt to pursue secondary education in the STEM field.

Todd’s most significant contribution to her field has been the first discovery of an hyperthermophilic manganese oxidizing bacteria. This work was significant because there had been little previous work on the morphological features of manganese oxidizing bacteria. By examination of the morphological features of manganese oxidizing bacteria, Todd proposed that researchers can begin to understand the ancient geomorphological conditions under which they developed, providing further insight into Earth’s geologic processes.

As an Indigenous scientist, Todd incorporates traditional ecological knowledge (TEK) with geological information and works with Indigenous communities in her scientific research. Todd seeks to increase participation of Indigenous students within STEM so that future work can be more inclusive, diverse and innovative.

Todd’s advocacy work continuously furthers her goal of creating a more inclusive space within STEM for Indigenous individuals. In 2017 Todd founded a geoscience education program, the Center for Coastal Margin Observation and Prediction (CMOP) in her home community of Hydaburg, Alaska. CMOP was formed in direct partnership with the community, (Hydaburg Cooperative Association) and the Hydaburg School District. Todd’s goal through this program was to acknowledge Alaskan natives' concerns about development and extractive industries in their traditional territories and create a space where these concerns can be addressed through a program designed to blend traditional western science with TEK to meet the needs of indigenous students. When this program began in 2007, only 19% of high school graduates in this community continued to post-secondary education, but after 12 years, those numbers rose to 65% of high school graduates pursuing a STEM degree in post-secondary education. These numbers are a testament that incorporating TEK and other types of Indigenous pedagogies into scientific endeavors can be beneficial for Indigenous communities.

== Organizations, appointments and board positions ==
Xaadas Kil Kuyaas Foundation: Todd has been on the Board of Directors since 2014 & President of this foundation since June 2024. The foundation is a non-profit organization in Southeast Alaska, in the city of Hydaburg. Its mission is to promote, preserve, and perpetuate the Haida language, which is rapidly fading.

Open Rivers Magazine: Todd has served as associate editor for this magazine from January 2024 to the present.

University of Minnesota Duluth: Todd served as the Dr. Howard High Holt Endowed Professor full-time from August 2019 to August 2024. In this role, she was faculty in American Indian Studies, teaching courses for the Master of Tribal Resources and Environmental Stewardship (MTRES) Program and Earth & Environmental Sciences.

Community Editorial Board (University of Minnesota Duluth): Todd served as the chair from August 2020 to June 2024. This board is a formal international body of members with passion for and expertise in literature based in Native American/Indigenous culture and ways of knowing. The members also possess the credentials to critically review such literature.

Geoscience Education: Todd was the director of the Alaska Native Geoscience Ed Program from September 2008 to June 2024.

Journal of Geoscience Education: Todd was an associate editor for this journal from January 2020 to January 2024.

American Association for the Advancement of Science (AAAS): Todd was an AAAS Science Technology & Policy Fellow hosted by the National Science Foundation (NSF) from September 2017 to August 2019. AAAS: Todd is an Education Section Steering Committee Member at Large from January 2023 to present.

Michigan State University: Todd was a Postdoctoral Research Fellow at Michigan State University from November 2015 to September 2017.

OHSU | Oregon Health & Science University: Todd was an instructor of REU undergraduate professional development from June 2014 to June 2015 and a Graduate Student Research Assistant from September 2008 to June 2015.

Portland State University: Todd worked as a Laboratory Technician/Manager in the Department of Geology from January 2002 to January 2008, and as an Undergraduate Research Assistant from September 2000 to August 2001.

== Awards ==
American Geochemical Union, Presidential Citation For Science And Society, awarded December 2020.

Professional of the Year, awarded October 2019 by the American Indian Science & Engineering Society.

== Commemorations ==
In 2021, artist Amanda Phingbodhipakkiya created a mural in Seattle, Washington, inspired by Todd’s work in science as a Haida woman. Entitled “Everything Depends on Everything Else,” the mural, which illustrates the Haida phrase “Áajii ‘wáadluaan uu gud ahl Kíiwaagang” meaning “Everything is connected,” was ceremonial blessed on September 12, 2021 and is scheduled to be displayed until 2026.
