= Margaret B. Blackman =

American anthropologist

Margaret B. Blackman (born 1944) is an anthropologist known for her work with the Haida First Nation of Haida Gwaii in British Columbia, Canada, beginning in the 1970s.

She is an emeriti professor of anthropology at the State University of New York at Brockport.

She published a collaborative biography of the Haida artist Florence Davidson, published in 1982. In 1992 she published Sadie Brower Neakok: An Iñupiaq Woman. Sadie Neakok was the first female magistrate in Alaska.

Margaret served as mayor of Brockport, New York from 2013 to 2025.

== Selected works ==
- Blackman, Margaret (1982; rev. ed., 1992) During My Time: Florence Edenshaw Davidson, a Haida Woman. Seattle: University of Washington Press. ISBN 9780295959436
- Davidson, Robert, and Margaret B. Blackman (1992) Foreword. Raven's Cry by Christie Harris. Vancouver: Douglas & McIntyre.
