= Button blanket =

Wool blanket embellished with mother-of-pearl buttons

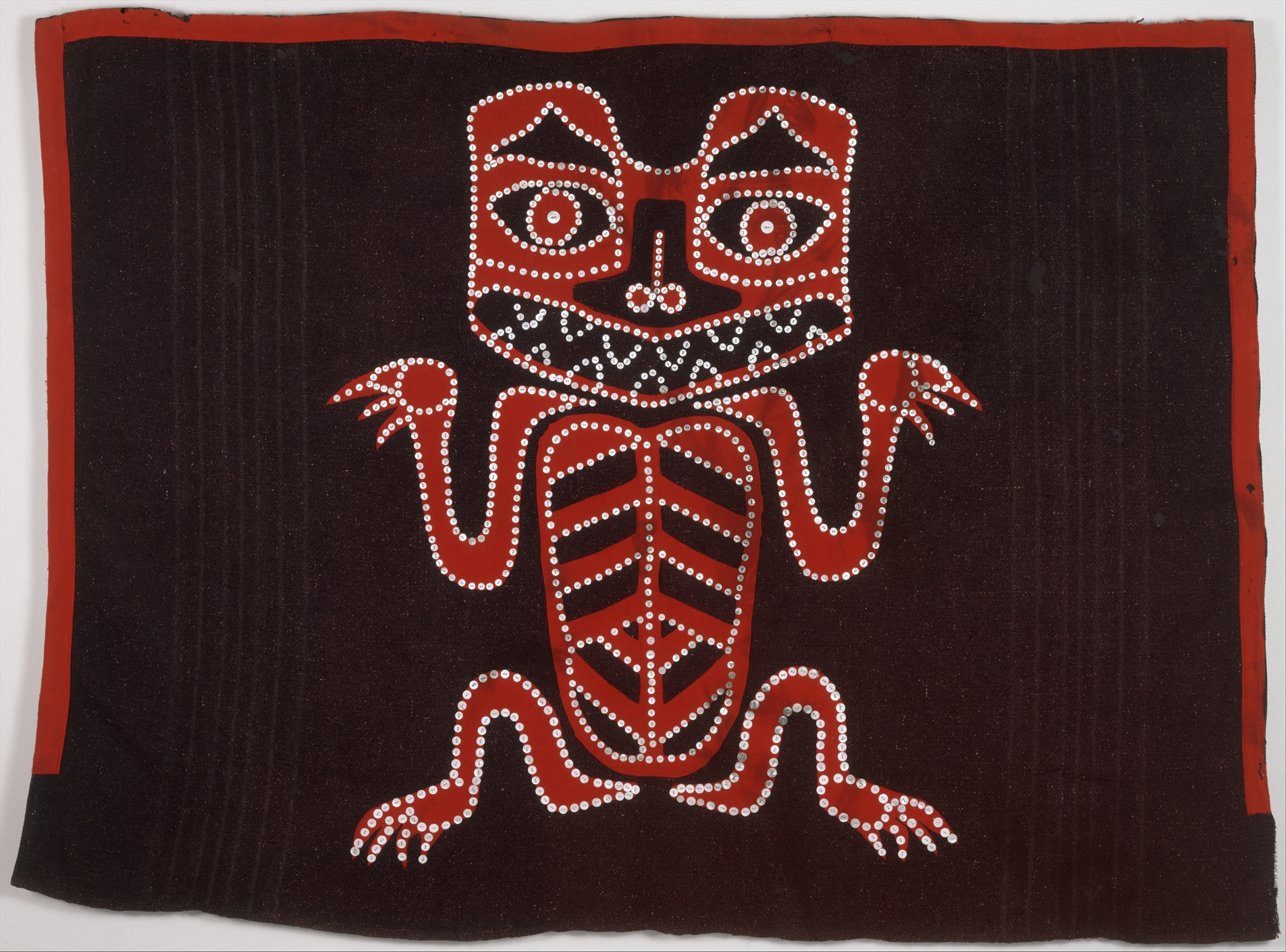
Button blanket circa 1880 in the collection of the Metropolitan Museum of Art

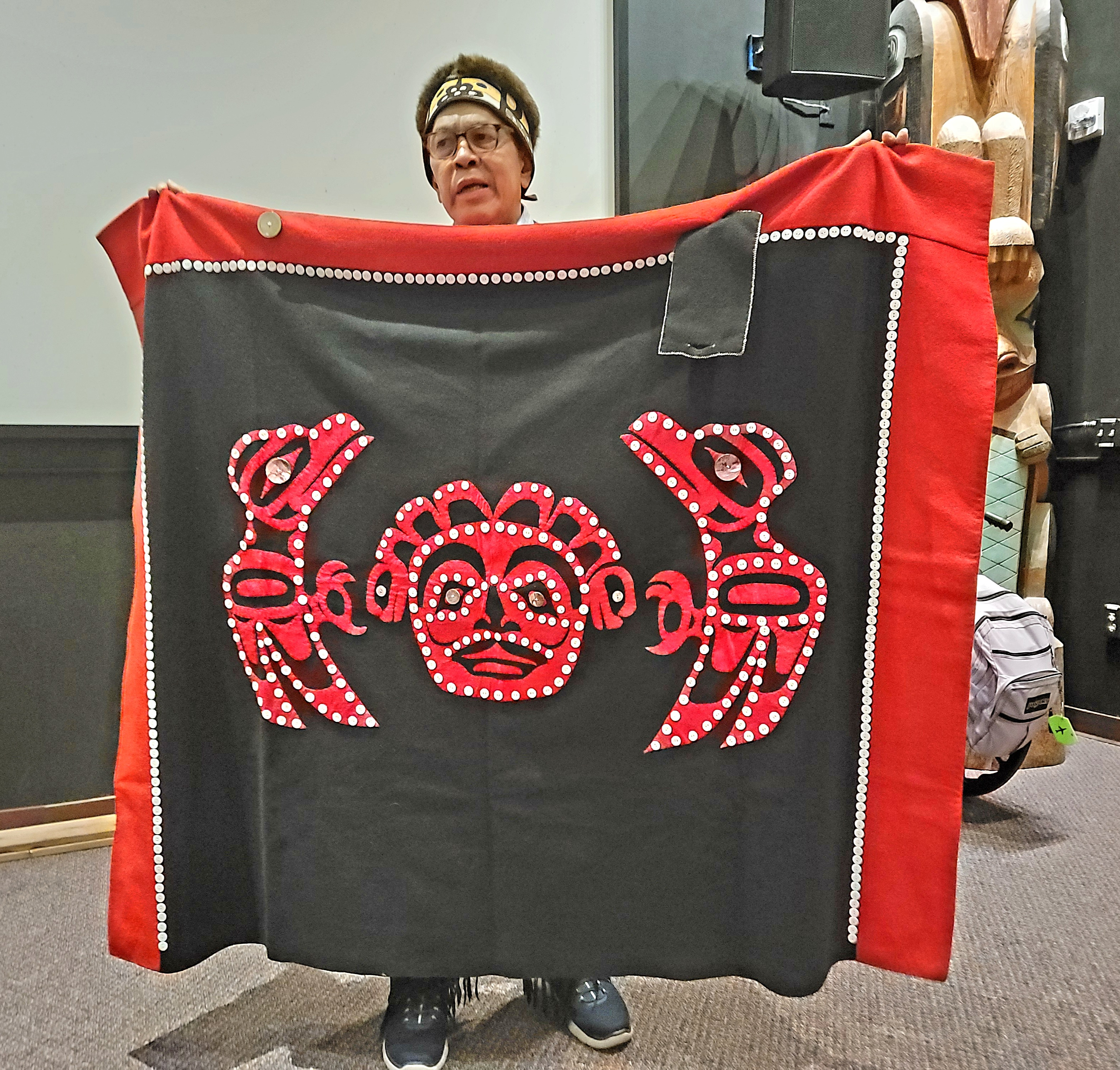
Contemporary button blanket shown by its maker at the Goldbelt Tram in Juneau, Alaska

A button blanket is wool blanket embellished with mother-of-pearl buttons, created by Northwest Coastal tribes, that is worn for ceremonial purposes. The blankets are used as capes and gifts at ceremonial dances and potlatches, and not used for sleeping.

The blankets usually have a red border on the upper and lateral edges. A central crest figure is created from the buttons and red flannel appliqué. Button blankets are worn over the shoulders and the crest design hangs on the back of the wearer.

"Ceremonial robes and their associated regalia are generationally significant for being the insignias of family, clan histories, duties, rights, and privileges. have been among the most spectacular creations of the Indian people of the Northwest Coast of North America. For generations, these robes have served as insignia of family and clan histories, duties, rights, and privileges. They serve as statements of Indigenous identity especially in contemporary Canadian society.

The blankets were originally acquired from the Hudson's Bay Company traders during the mid-19th century. The trade blankets were typically dark blue duffel and decorated with buttons made from abalone or dentalium shells. The central crest typically portrayed a symbol of the wearer's family heritage.

Among the people who make button blankets, the blankets are not hung from walls except at funerals or near the graves of chiefs.

Haida artist Florence Davidson (1896–1993) was known for her button blankets.

In 2015, law student Christina Gray of the Lax Kw'alaams Tsimshian nation formally obtained the right to wear a button blanket and cedar hat with her barrister's robes during the ceremony in which she was called to the bar in Ontario. She cited the use of the button blanket as a symbol of her nation's legal traditions.

== See also ==
- Alaska Native art
- Chilkat weaving
- Native American art
- Northwest Coast art
- Hudson's Bay point blanket
