= Gerry Marks =

Canadian First Nations artist of Haida ancestry

Gerry Marks (June 20, 1949 – March 27, 2020) is a Canadian First Nations artist of Haida ancestry.

He grew up in Vancouver, British Columbia, the grandson of John Marks, a Haida artist.

Marks studied with the Haida carver Freda Diesing in Prince Rupert, British Columbia, starting in 1971 and later studied at Hazelton, British Columbia

In 1977 Marks and Francis Williams carved a 25-foot totem pole in Masset, his ancestral Haida village on the Queen Charlotte Islands.
