= Florence Davidson =

First Nations artist from British Columbia (1896–1993)

Florence Edenshaw Davidson
- Jadał q'egəngá
- Florence Davidson weaves a spruce root hat c. 1976. Photo by Ulli Steltzer
- Born: September 15, 1896; Masset, Haida Gwaii, British Columbia
- Died: December 13, 1993 (aged 97)
- Citizenship: Haida and Canadian
- Known for: Traditional basketry and button blankets; consultant on Haida language
- Notable work: During My Time: Florence Edenshaw Davidson, a Haida Woman
- Spouse: Robert Davidson (1880–1969)
- Children: 13 children, Daughter, Primrose Adams
- Father: Charles Edenshaw
- Relatives: Grandsons, Reg Davidson and Robert Davidson

Florence Edenshaw Davidson (1896–1993) was a Canadian First Nations artist from Haida Gwaii. She created basketry and button blankets and was a respected elder in her village of Masset, Haida Gwaii, British Columbia.

== Early life ==
Florence Edenshaw was born in Masset on September 15, 1896, the daughter of the Haida artist Charles Edenshaw (Chief Idɨnsaw) and his wife Isabella (K'woiyəng). She was given the Haida name Jadał q'egəngá ("Story Maid"). As a child, she help her mother to sew button blankets.

She was of the Raven moiety, of the Y'akwə'lanas lineage, and of the Shark House (Q'ad Nas), with crests that included Shark, Two-Finned Killerwhale, and Brown Bear.

== Personal life ==
She married Robert Davidson (1880–1969), a Haida, on February 23, 1911, and they had 13 children. Her daughter Primrose Adams, also an artist, received the Creative Lifetime Achievement Award for First Nations' Art in 2011.

== Career ==
Davidson became renowned for her blankets and for her spruce-root and cedar baskets.

In the 1960s she was consultant on Haida culture and Masset history to the writer Christie Harris, author of Raven's Cry. She was also a major consultant on Haida language to John Enrico.

She became well known through her collaborative autobiography written with the anthropologist Margaret B. Blackman, published in 1982.

== Death and legacy ==
Davidson died December 13, 1993. Her artistic legacy continues with her grandsons, the brothers Reg Davidson and Robert Davidson, who are woodcarvers and sculptors.
