= Reg Davidson =

Aboriginal Canadian carver

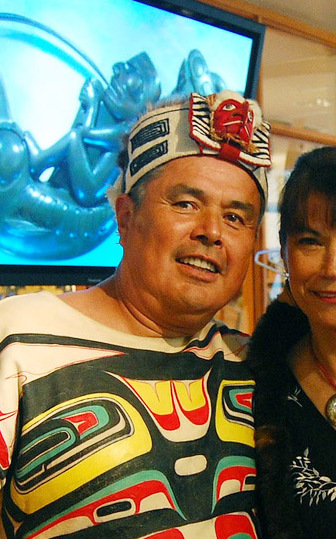
Davidson in 2010

Reg Davidson (born 1954) is an Aboriginal Canadian carver and a member of the Haida band government.

He was born in 1954 at the Haida village of Masset on the Queen Charlotte Islands of British Columbia. His parents are Claude and Vivian Davidson and, through Claude, he is the grandson of the Haida artist and memoirist Florence Davidson. He is a member of the Eagle moiety, Ts'ał'lanas lineage. He began carving argillite in 1972 and became apprenticed to his older brother, the carver Robert Davidson, during the carving of a housefront and houseposts in honour of their grandmother Florence Davidson's father Charles Edenshaw in 1977 and 1978.

Davidson works in argillite and wood and also produces silkscreens.

== Sources ==
- Blackman, Margaret B. (1982; rev. ed., 1992) During My Time: Florence Edenshaw Davidson, a Haida Woman. Seattle: University of Washington Press.
- Macnair, Peter L., Alan L. Hoover, and Kevin Neary (1984) The Legacy: Tradition and Innovation in Northwest Coast Indian Art. Vancouver, B.C.: Douglas & McIntyre.
- Stewart, Hilary (1993). Looking at Totem Poles. Seattle: University of Washington Press. ISBN.
- Thom, Ian M. (2009), "Reg Davidson", Challenging Traditions: Contemporary First Nations Art of the Northwest Coast, Douglas & McIntyre, pp. 24–27.
