= Haida people =

Indigenous people of the Pacific Northwest Coast

Haida
X̱aayda, X̱aadas, X̱aad, X̱aat
- Flag of the Council of the Haida Nation (CHN)

- Map of traditional Haida territory

Regions with significant populations
- Canada: 6,525
- United States: 5,977

Languages
- Haida, English

Religion
- Haida, Christianity

- People: Haida
- Language: Haida kil
- Country: Haida Gwaii

The Haida (English: /ˈhaɪdə/, Haida: X̱aayda, X̱aadas, X̱aad, X̱aat) are an indigenous people of the Pacific Northwest Coast of North America. They constitute one of 203 First Nations in British Columbia and 231 federally recognized tribes in Alaska.

Their traditional territory include Haida Gwaii, an archipelago off the coast of British Columbia, and the southern half of Prince of Wales Island, in Southeast Alaska. Their language is Haida, a linguistic isolate. The Haida are known for their craftsmanship, trading skills, and seamanship. They are known to have frequently carried out raids and to have practiced slavery.

In Canada, the Haida are represented by Council of the Haida Nation (CHN), in addition to the two village band governments, Old Massett Village Council and Skidegate Band Council. Federally recognized Haida tribes in the United States include the Central Council of the Tlingit & Haida Indian Tribes of Alaska and the Hydaburg Cooperative Association.

== Haida governments ==
The Council of the Haida Nation is the main governing body of the Haida First Nations in Canada, who are:

- Old Massett Village Council, British Columbia
- Skidegate Band Council, British Columbia

Federally recognized tribes of Haida people in the United States are:

- Central Council of the Tlingit & Haida Indian Tribes, Alaska
- Hydaburg Cooperative Association, Alaska
- Organized Village of Kasaan, Alaska

== History ==
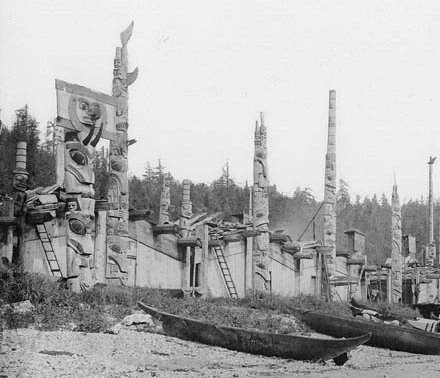
Houses and totem poles, 1878

=== Precontact ===
Haida history begins with the arrival of the primordial ancestresses of the Haida matrilineages in Haida Gwaii. These include SGuuluu Jaad (Foam Woman), Jiila Kuns (Creek Woman), and KalGa Jaad (Ice woman). The Haida canon of oral histories and archaeological findings agree that Haida ancestors lived alongside glaciers and were present at the time of the arrival of the first tree, a lodgepole pine, on Haida Gwaii. Recent archaeological evidence suggests habitation as early as 13,100 BP.

For thousands of years since Haida have participated in a rigorous coast-wide legal system called Potlatch. After the Island's wide arrival of red cedar some 7,500 years ago Haida society transformed to centre around the coastal "tree of life". Massive carved cedar monuments and cedar big houses became widespread throughout Haida Gwaii.

In the early 18th century, Haida from K'iis Gwaii in the Duu Guusd region of Haida Gwaii migrated north, settling at the southern half of Prince of Wales Island in Alaska, next to Tlingit territory. This group would become known as the Kaigani Haida.

=== 18th century ===
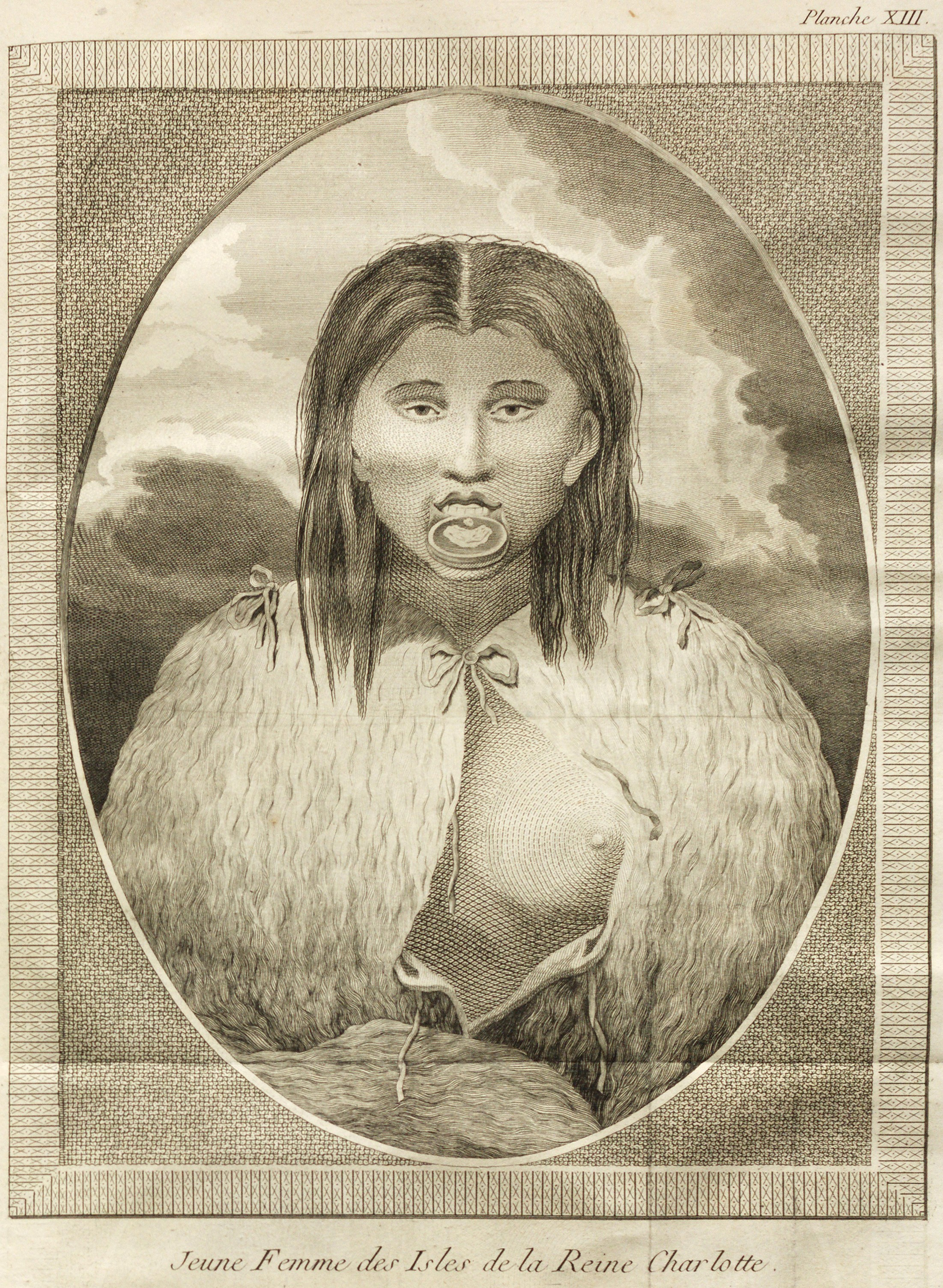
Young Haida woman with lip plate, portrayed in George Dixon's (1789): Voyage autour du monde

The first recorded contact between the Haida and Europeans was in July 1774 with Spanish explorer Juan Pérez, who was sailing north on an expedition to find and claim new territory for Spain. For two days in a row, his ship Santiago sat off the shore of Haida Gwaii waiting for the currents to settle down enough to allow them to land. While they waited, several canoes of Haida sailed out to greet them, and ultimately to trade with Pérez and his men. After two days of poor sea conditions, however, the Santiago was ultimately unable to land and they were forced to depart without having set foot on Haida Gwaii.

The Haida conducted regular trade with Russian, Spanish, British, and American maritime fur traders and whalers. According to sailing records, they diligently maintained strong trade relationships with Westerners, other coastal peoples, and among themselves. Trade for sea-otter pelts was initiated by British Captain George Dixon with the Haida in 1787. The Haida did well for themselves in this industry and until the mid-1800s they were at the centre of the profitable China sea-otter trade.

Although they had gone on expeditions as far as Washington State, at first they had minimal confrontations with Europeans. Between 1780 and 1830, the Haida came into conflict with European and American traders. Among the dozens of ships the tribe captured were the Eleanor and the Susan Sturgis. The tribe made use of European weapons they acquired, using cannons and canoe-mounted swivel guns.

=== 19th century ===
In 1850, gold was discovered on southern Haida Gwaii. The Haida had been instructed to look for the mineral by the Hudson's Bay Company. A Haida man, possibly Albert Edenshaw, was shown where to find gold by an elderly woman in Skidegate, which he subsequently brought to officers at Fort Simpson. This discovery instigated a brief gold rush in 1851, drawing American prospectors to the area. The Haida themselves took an active role in the mining of gold, seeing it as a new material for trade. In response to the gold rush, British colonial authorities formally annexed Haida Gwaii in 1853, establishing the Colony of the Queen Charlotte Islands. It was later integrated into the Colony of British Columbia in 1858. Colonial authorities backed their claims using gunboat diplomacy, both in Haida Gwaii and more broadly throughout northeastern Pacific coastal Indigenous title territories.

Also in 1857, the USS Massachusetts was sent from Seattle to nearby Port Gamble, where indigenous raiding parties made up of Haida (from territory claimed by the British) and Tongass (from territory claimed by the Russians) had been attacking and enslaving the Coast Salish people there. When the Haida and Tongass (sea lion tribe Tlingit) warriors refused to acknowledge American jurisdiction and to hand over those among them who had attacked the Puget Sound communities, a battle ensued in which 26 natives and one government soldier were killed. In the aftermath of this, Colonel Isaac Ebey, a U.S. military officer and the first settler on Whidbey Island, was shot and beheaded on August 11, 1857, by a small Tlingit group from Kake, Alaska, in retaliation for the killing of a respected Kake chief in the raid the year before. Ebey's scalp was purchased from the Kake by an American trader in 1860.

==== Smallpox epidemic of 1862 ====
The 1862 Pacific Northwest smallpox epidemic began on March 26 when a steamship called Brother Jonathan arrived in Fort Victoria from San Francisco containing a passenger infected with smallpox. At the time, thousands of Indigenous people lived in villages outside the walls of Fort Victoria. The disease broke out amongst Tsimshian people in their community near Fort Victoria. This quickly spread into a pandemic. European public health standards at the time were well practiced and adhered-to official health standards, including vaccinations and victims isolation. Instead, as the disease spread, Victoria Police burned some one dozen homes, deliberately displacing 200 Haida on May 13. They went on to burn some 40–50 more indigenous villages the following day.

First Nations from further north had been camping periodically outside the city limits of Victoria to take advantage of trade, and at the time of the epidemic numbered almost 2000, many of whom were Haida. The colonial government made no effort to vaccinate the First Nations in the region nor to quarantine anyone infected. In June, the encampments were forcibly cleared by police, and 20 canoes of Haidas, many of whom were likely already infected with smallpox, were forced back to Haida Gwaii, escorted by gunboats HMS Grappler and Forward. Those infected did not make it home, according to the plans of the colonial governments, and passed on at Bones Bay near Alert Bay.

Later on a group of copper miners travelled from Bella Coola aboard the Leonede under command of Captain McAlmond. The boat took 12 passengers in December. One of these passengers carried smallpox to Haida Gwaii. This might not have been a disaster should the infected miner have stayed in isolation at the mining site on Sḵʼin G̱aadll, or Skincuttle Island. Instead the disease was spread throughout Haida Gwaii.

The disease quickly spread throughout Haida Gwaii, devastating entire villages and families, and creating an influx of refugees. The pre-epidemic population of Haida Gwaii was estimated to be 6,607, but was reduced to 829 in 1881. The only two remaining villages were Massett and Skidegate. The population collapse caused by the epidemic weakened Haida sovereignty and power, ultimately paving the way for colonization.

==== Arrival of missionaries ====
From the mid-19th century onwards, both Anglican and Methodist missions were established on Haida Gwaii, endeavouring to convert the Haida people. The first known missionary to spend time with the Haida was Jonathan Green, a missionary for the American Board of Commissioners for Foreign Missions. Green spent a few weeks on Haida Gwaii in the summer of 1829, though his later suggestions for the establishment of a mission on the coast were ignored.

In 1854 and 1868, two different Anglican missionaries tried to garner support for the establishment of a mission on Haida Gwaii, to no avail. In the 1860s, several Northern Haida visited the newly founded Tsimshian community of Metlakatla, by Anglican missionary William Duncan, prompting them to request a missionary of their own. It wouldn't be until November 1876, Anglican missionary William Collison, acting on behalf of the Church Mission Society, established the first permanent mission on Haida Gwaii, located in Masset. In response to the Anglican mission established in Masset, the Haida in Skidegate petitioned for their own mission. Consequently, a Methodist mission was established there in 1883.

==== Potlatch ban ====
The potlatch (Haida: gyáa isáaw) began to decline with the arrival of the missionaries, who believed it to be antithetical to their mission of converting the Haida to Christianity. Missionaries like Collison sought to replace the potlatch with Christian ceremonies, such as the singing of hymns. Others, like Methodist Charles Harrison, dissuaded potlatching through public chastisement. By the 1880s, potlatches were often conducted in secrecy, primarily as a result of pressure exerted by missionaries.

In 1884, the potlatch was outlawed throughout the coast, under an amendment to the Indian Act, known as the potlatch ban. The elimination of the potlatch system destroyed financial relationships and seriously interrupted the cultural heritage of coastal people. As the islands were christianized, many cultural works such as totem posts were destroyed or taken to museums around the world. This significantly undermined Haida's self-knowledge and further diminished morale.

=== 20th century ===
The government began forcibly sending some Haida children to residential schools as early as 1911. Haida children were sent as far away as Alberta to live among English-speaking families where they were to be assimilated into the dominant culture.

In 1911, Canada and British Columbia rejected a Haida offer whereby in exchange for full rights of British citizenship Haidas would formally join the Dominion of Canada.

==== Lyell Island protests ====
In November 1985, members of the Haida nation protested the ongoing logging of old-growth forests on Haida Gwaii, establishing a blockade to prevent the logging of Lyell Island by Western Forest Products. A standoff between protesters, police and loggers lasted two weeks, during which 72 Haidas were arrested. Images of elders being arrested gained media traction, which raised awareness and support for the Haida across Canada. In 1987, the governments of Canada and British Columbia signed the South Moresby Agreement, establishing the Gwaii Haanas National Park, which is cooperatively managed by the Canadian government and the Haida Nation.

The blockade was profiled in Christopher Auchter's 2024 documentary film The Stand.

=== 21st century ===
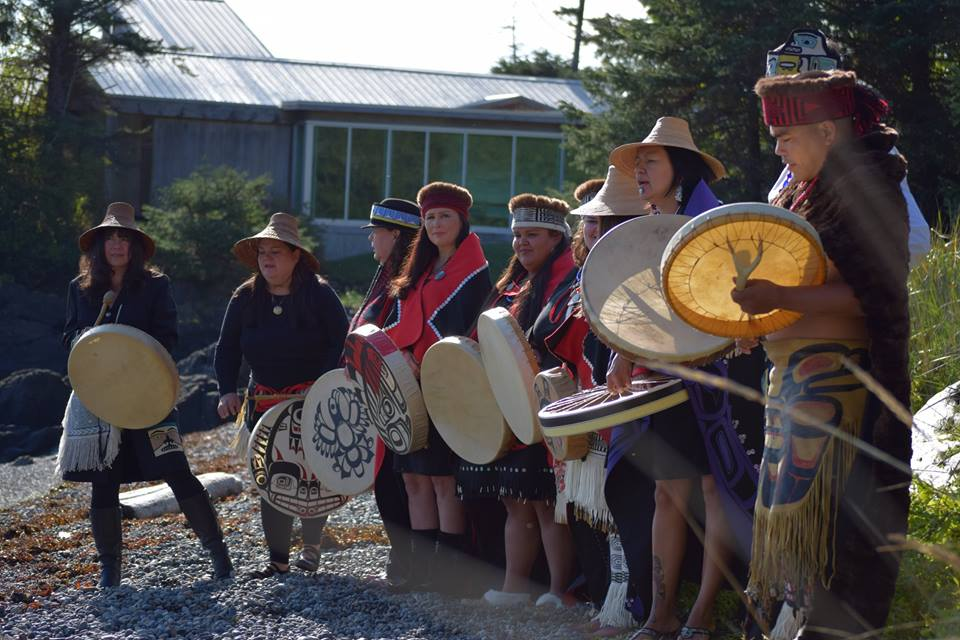
Haida drummers and singers greet guests on the shores of Ḵay Linagaay, a millennia-old village in Haida Gwaii.

In December 2009, the government of British Columbia officially renamed the archipelago from Queen Charlotte Islands to Haida Gwaii. The Haida Nation asserts Haida title over all of Haida Gwaii and is pursuing negotiations with the provincial and federal governments. Haida authorities continue to pass legislation and manage human activities in Haida Gwaii, which includes making formal agreements with the Canadian communities established on the islands. Haida efforts are largely directed at the protection of land and water and functioning ecosystems and this is expressed in the protected status for nearly 70% of the million-hectare archipelago. The protected status applies to the landscape and water as well as smaller culturally significant areas. They have also forced a reduction of large-scale industrial activity and the careful regulation of access to resources.

In British Columbia, the term "Haida Nation" often refers to the Haida people as a whole however, it also refers to their government, the Council of the Haida Nation. All people of Haida ancestry are entitled to Haida citizenship, including the Kaigani, who as Alaskans are also part of the Central Council Tlingit Haida Indian Tribes of Alaska government.

In a deal negotiated between the government and the Haida nation over the preceding decades, British Columbia in 2024 transferred the title of more than 200 islands off Canada's west coast to the Haida people, recognizing the nation's aboriginal land title across all of Haida Gwaii.

== Culture ==
=== Language ===
The Haida language is considered to be an isolate. In the late 19th and early 20th centuries, Haida was de facto banned with the introduction of residential schools and the enforcement of the use of English language. Haida language revitalization projects began in the 1970s and continue to this day. It is estimated that there are only three or four dozen Haida-speaking people with almost all of them being the age of 70 or older.

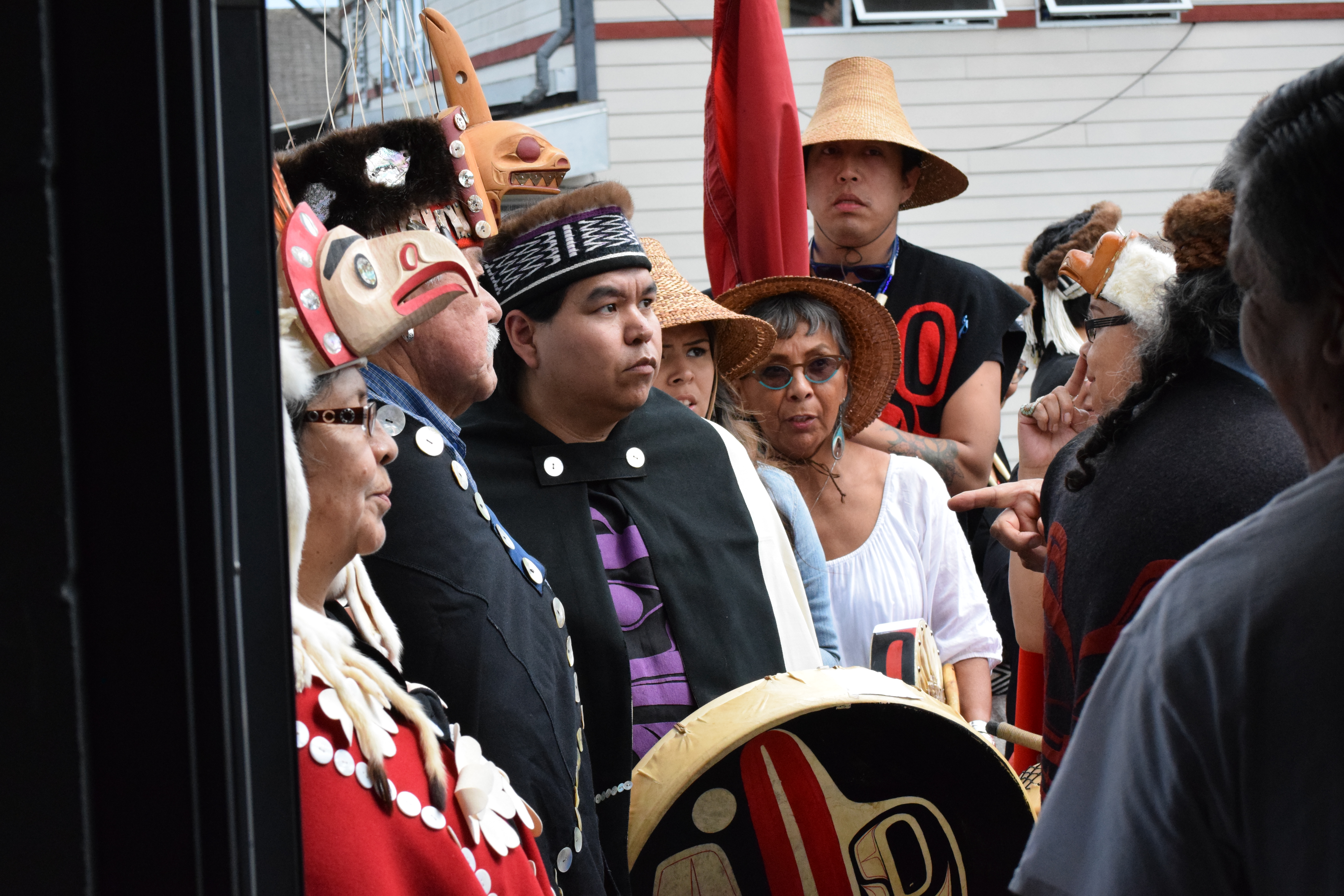
Haida wait for their Heiltsuk hosts to welcome them to sing and dance at a peace potlatch in Waglisla.

=== Potlatch ===
Haida host potlatches, which are intricate economic and social-political processes that include acquisition of incorporeal wealth like names and the circulation of property in the form of gifts. They are often held when a citizen wishes to commemorate an event of importance; for example, deaths of a loved one, marriages, and other civil proceedings. The more important potlatches take years to prepare and can continue for days.

=== Art ===
Haida society continues to produce a robust and highly stylized art form, a leading component of Northwest Coast art. While artists frequently have expressed this in large wooden carvings (totem poles), Chilkat weaving, or ornate jewellery, in the 21st century, younger people are also making art in a popular expression such as Haida manga.

The Haida also created "notions of wealth", and Jenness credits them with the introduction of the totem pole (Haida: ǥyaagang) and the bentwood box. Missionaries regarded the carved poles as graven images rather than representations of the family histories that wove Haida society together. Chiefly families showed their histories by erecting totems outside their homes, or on house posts forming the building.

Well known contemporary Haida artists include Bill Reid, Robert Davidson, Michael Nicoll Yahgulanaas, and Freda Diesing amongst others.

==== Transformation masks ====
Transformation masks were worn ceremonially, used by dancers and represented or illustrated the connection between various spirits. The masks usually depicted an animal transforming into another animal or a spiritual or mythical being. Masks were representations of the souls of the mask owner's family waiting in the afterlife to be reborn. Masks worn during ceremonial dances were designed with strings to open the mask, transforming the spiritual animal into a carving of the ancestor underneath. There was also an emphasis on the idea of metamorphosis and reincarnation. With the banning of potlatches by the Canadian government in 1885, many masks were confiscated. Masks and many other objects are considered sacred and designed only for specific people to see. It was unknown who the wearer of the mask was as each mask was made for each individual's soul and spirit animal. Due to the confiscation of the masks and the sacred meaning to each individual who wore the mask, it is unknown if the masks in museums are truly meant to be seen or if they are an aspect of European colonialism and the rejection of Haida religious and spiritual traditions.

==== Film ====
In 2018, the first feature-length Haida-language film, The Edge of the Knife (Haida: SG̲aawaay Ḵʹuuna), was released, with an all-Haida cast. The actors learned Haida for their performances in the film, with a two-week training camp followed by lessons throughout the five weeks of filming. Haida artist Gwaai Edenshaw and Tsilhqot'in filmmaker Helen Haig-Brown directed, with Edenshaw and his brother being co-screenwriters, with Graham Richard and Leonie Sandercock.

Christopher Auchter, the nephew of Michael Nicoll Yahgulanaas, has created a number of Haida centered films. In 2017 he directed the animated film The Mountain of SGaana, inspired by Haida mythology. His short documentary Now Is the Time premiered at the 2019 Toronto International Film Festival.

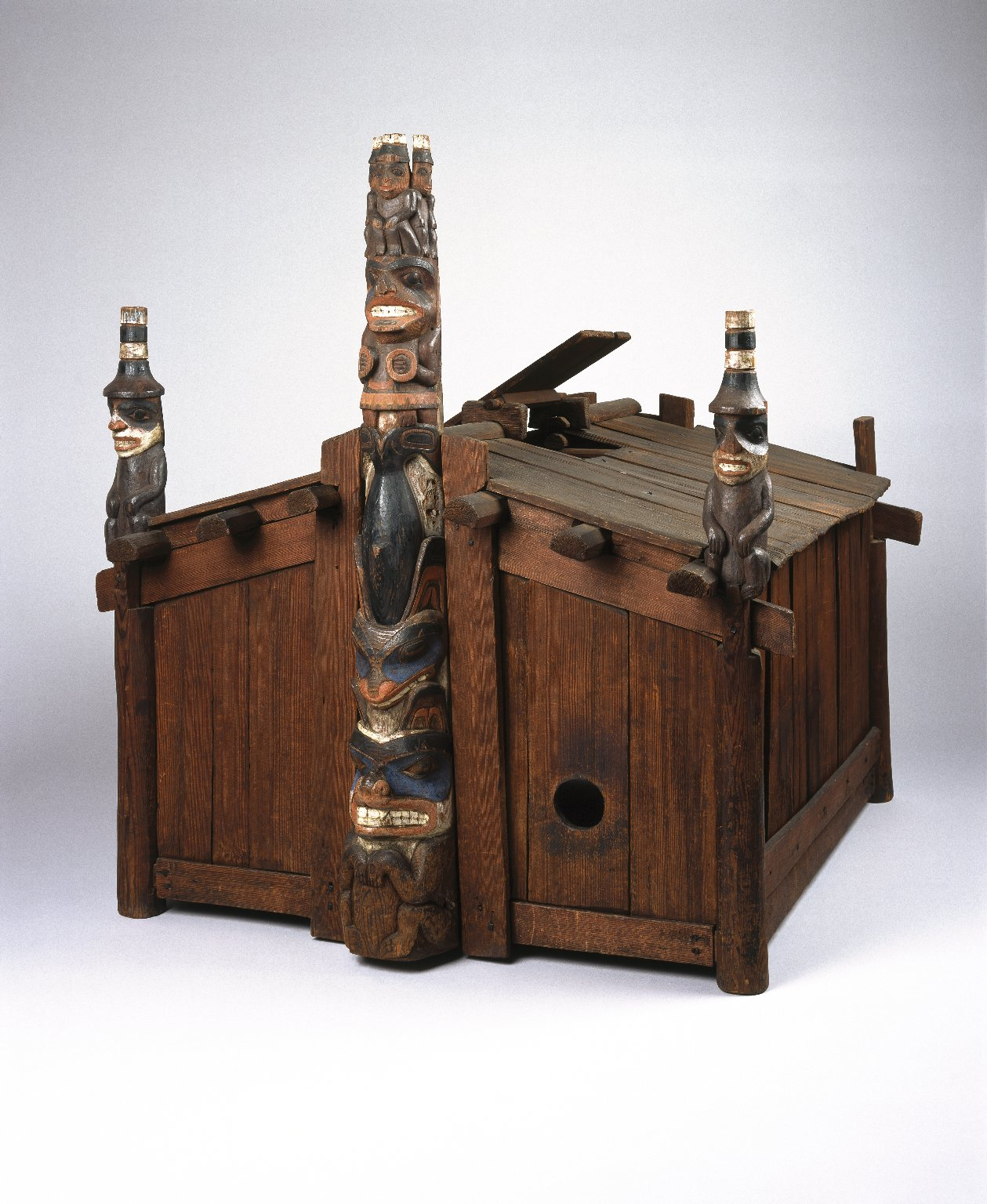
Model of House of Contentment, late 19th century, Brooklyn Museum

=== Social organization ===
==== Moieties ====
The Haida nation was split between two moieties, the Raven and the Eagle. Marriages between two people from the same moiety were prohibited. Due to this any children that were born after the marriage would officially become part of the moiety that the mother had come from. Each group provided its members with entitlement to a vast range of economic resources such as fishing spots, hunting or collecting areas, and housing sites. Each group also had rights to their own myths and legends, dances, songs, and music. Eagles and Ravens were very important to the Haida families as they would identify with one or the other and this would signify what side on the village they would reside on. The family would also own their own property, had specific areas for food gathering. These categories of Eagles and Ravens divided them on an even larger scale, specifying their land, history, and customs.

The Haida social system changed significantly by the end of the nineteenth century. At this point a majority of the Haida had taken nuclear family forms, and members of families belonging in the same moiety (Ravens and Eagles) were permitted to marry each other.

==== Gender ====
Haida woman.

The roles of the family varied between men and women. Men were responsible for all of the hunting and fishing, building homes and carving canoes and totem poles. The women's responsibilities were to stay close to home doing a majority of their work on the land. Women were responsible for all of the chores in relation to the keeping of the home. Women were also in charge of curing cedarwood to use for weaving and making clothes. It was also the duty of the women to gather berries and dig for shellfish and clams.

Once a boy hit puberty, his uncles on his mothers' side would educate him on his family history and how to behave now that he was a man. It was believed that a special diet would increase his abilities. For example, duck tongues helped him hold his breath under water, whereas blue jay tongues helped him to be a strong climber.

The aunts on the father's side of a young Haida woman would teach her about her duties to her tribe once she first began to menstruate. The young woman would go to a secluded space in her family home. They believed that by making her sleep on a stone pillow and only allowing her to eat and drink small amounts she would become tougher.

Although not commonly practiced today, it was once customary for young boys and girls entering puberty to embark on vision quests. These quests would send them out alone for days. They would travel through the forests, in hopes of finding a spirit to guide them through their lives. It was believed that boys and girls who were destined for greatness could find unique spirit guides. A successful vision quest was celebrated by the wearing of masks, face paints, and costumes.

=== Religion ===
Haida beliefs are varied and diverse. Modern Haida ascribe to a wide variety of faiths including Protestantism, Catholicism, and Bahá'i. Nihilist, atheist, agnostic, and absurdist perspectives also attend the nation's post-colonial context. Pre-colonial beliefs, however, may still be most popular, and potlatch maintains its elevated situation in Haida society.

Many Haida believe in an ultimate being called Ne-kilst-lass, spelt Nang Kilsdlaas in Skidegate dialect, which can manifest through the form and antics of a Raven. Ne-kilst-lass revealed the world and was an active player in the creation of life. While Ne-kilst-lass has a generous inclination, they also includes a darker, indulgent, and trickster quality.

Nang Kilsldaas is one of many dozens of supernatural beings who personify a wide variety of forces, objects, places, and phenomena. A few of the most prevalent include K_ing.gii, a deity who presides over the seas; X_yuu, the northeast wind; and Sin SG_aanuwee, a cosmological "super-being" that encompasses all others.

In traditional Haida society, shamans (sg̱aaga) served as intermediaries between the human and spirit worlds, performing healing rituals and communicating with supernatural beings on behalf of their communities.

=== Warfare ===
Prior to contact with Europeans, other Indigenous communities regarded the Haida as aggressive warriors and made attempts to avoid sea battles with them. There is some archeological evidence that the Northwest coast tribes, to which the Haida belong, engaged in warfare as early as 2200 BC, although it was not a regular occurrence in the archeological record until the subsequent millennium. Though the Haida were more likely to participate in sea battles, it was not uncommon for them to engage in hand-to-hand combat or long-range attacks. Hostilities were not always violent, often ritualized and some resulting in Peace Treaties still in force hundreds of years later.

==== Archeological and written evidence of warfare ====
Analyses of skeletal injuries dating from the late Archaic period and early Formative period show that Northwest coast nations, particularly in the North where most Haida communities were situated, began more frequently engaging in battles of some sort from 1800 BC to AD 500, though the number of battles is unknown. This rise in the incidence of battles during the Middle Pacific period also correlates with the erection of the first defensive fortifications in Haida communities. These fortifications continued to be in use during the 18th century as evidenced by Captain James Cook's discovery of one such hilltop fortification in a Haida village. Numerous other sightings of such fortifications were recorded by other European explorers during this century.

==== Causes of warfare ====
There were multiple motivations for the Haida people to engage in warfare. Various accounts explain that the Haida went to battle more for revenge than anything else, and would acquire slaves from their enemies in the process. According to the anthropologist Margaret Blackman, warfare on Haida Gwaii was primarily motivated by revenge. Many Northwest coast legends tell of Haida communities raiding and fighting with neighbouring communities because of insults or other disputes. Other causes included conflicts over property, territory, resources, trade routes, and even women. However, a battle between a Haida community and another often did not have simply one cause. In fact, many battles were the result of decades old disputes.

The Haida, like several other Northwest coast Indigenous communities, engaged in slave raiding as slaves were highly sought after for their use as labor as well as bodyguards and warriors. During the 19th century, the Haida fought physically with other Indigenous communities to ensure domination of the fur trade with European merchants. Haida groups also had feuds with these European merchants that could last years. In 1789, some Haidas were accused of stealing items from Captain Kendrick, most of which included drying linen. Kendrick seized two Haida chiefs and threatened to kill them via cannon-fire if they did not return the stolen items. Though the Haida community complied at the time, less than two years later 100 to 200 of its people attacked the same ship.

==== War parties ====
The missionary William Collison describes having seen a Haida fleet of around forty canoes. However, he does not provide the number of warriors in these canoes, and there are no other known accounts that describe the number of warriors in a war party. The structure of a Haida war party generally followed that of the community itself, the only difference being that the chief took the lead during battles; otherwise his title was more or less meaningless. Medicine men were often brought along raids or before battles to "destroy the souls of enemies" and ensure victory.

==== Death in battle ====
Battles between a group of Haida warriors and another community sometimes resulted in the annihilation of either one or both of the groups involved. Villages would be burned down during a battle which was a common practice during Northwest coast battles. The Haida burned their warriors who died in battles, though it is not known if this act was done after each battle or only after battles in which they were victorious. The Haida believed that fallen warriors went to the House of Sun, which was considered a highly honorable death. For this reason, a specially made military suit was prepared for chiefs if they fell in battle. The slaves belonging to the chiefs who died in battle were burned with them.

==== Weapons used ====
The Haida used the bow and arrow until it was replaced by firearms acquired from Europeans in the 19th century, but other traditional weapons were still preferred. The weapons that the Haida used were often multi-functional; they were used not only in battle, but during other activities as well. For instance, daggers were very common and almost always the weapon of choice for hand-to-hand combat, and were also used during hunting and to create other tools. One medicine man's dagger that Alexander Mackenzie came across during his exploration of Haida Gwaii, was used both for fights and to hold the medicine man's hair up. Another dagger that Mackenzie obtained from a Haida village was said to be connected to a Haida legend; many daggers had individual histories which made them unique from one another.

==== Battle armour ====
The Haida wore rod-and-slat armour. This meant greaves for the thighs and lower back and slats (a long strip of wood) in the side pieces to allow for more flexibility during movement. They wore elk hide tunics under their armour and wooden helmets. Arrows could not penetrate this armour, and Russian explorers found that bullets could penetrate the armour only if shot from a distance of less than 6.1 metres (20 ft). The Haida rarely used shields because of their developed armour.

== Notable Haida ==
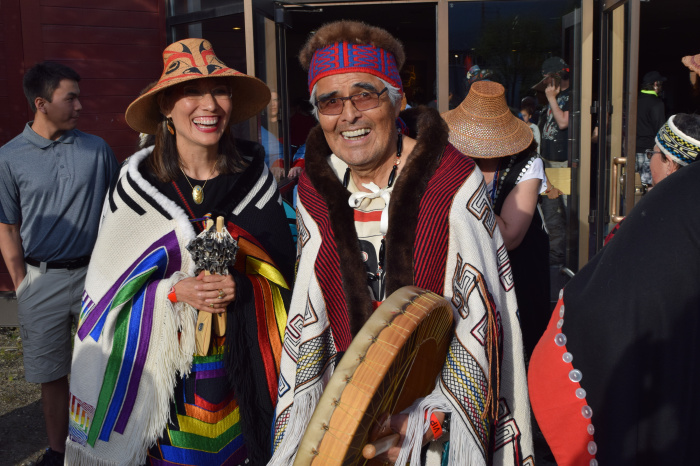
L–R: Haida lawyer gi7ahl g-udsllaay (Terri-Lynn Williams-Davidson) and master carver Robert Davidson

- Primrose Adams (1926–2020), artist
- Delores Churchill (b. 1929), artist, basketweaver
- Marcia Crosby, art historian
- Cumshewa, 18th century chief
- Florence Davidson (1896–1993), artist and memoirist
- Reg Davidson (b. 1954), carver
- Robert Davidson (b. 1946), carver
- Tamara Davidson, politician, MLA for North Coast-Haida Gwaii
- Freda Diesing (1925–2002), carver
- Charles Edenshaw (1839–1920), carver, jeweler and painter
- Gidansda Guujaaw (b. 1953), artist and politician, former President of the Council of the Haida Nation
- Dorothy Grant, artist, fashion designer
- Jim Hart (b. 1952), hereditary chief of Stasstas Eagle Clan, artist
- Koyah (fl. 1787–1795), chief
- Gerry Marks, artist
- Bill Reid (1920–1998), carver, sculptor and jeweler
- Jay Simeon (b. 1976), artist
- Skaay, historian and storytelling expert
- Wendy F. K’ah Skaahluwaa Todd, geomicrobiologist
- Evelyn Vanderhoop (b. 1953), weaver
- Bernie Williams (b. 1957), artist and activist
- Terri-Lynn Williams-Davidson, lawyer and artist
- Michael Nicoll Yahgulanaas (b. 1954), artist
- Don Yeomans (b. 1958), artist

== Anthropologists and scholars ==
This is an incomplete list of anthropologists and scholars who have done research on the Haida.

- Marius Barbeau
- Franz Boas
- Robert Bringhurst
- Wilson Duff
- Christie Harris
- Charles Hill-Tout
- Bill Holm
- Robert Bruce Inverarity
- Charles F. Newcombe
- John R. Swanton
- Nancy J. Turner
- Marianne Boelscher Ignace

== See also ==
- List of Haida villages
- Haida mythology
- Haida Heritage Centre
- Haida Argillite Carvings
- Haida manga
