= List of museums with major collections in ethnography and anthropology =

This is a list of museums with major collections in ethnography and anthropology. It is sorted by descending number of objects listed.

1. Canadian Museum of History, Ottawa, Ontario, Canada
  3.75 million artifacts
2. Musée du quai Branly, Paris, France
  1,170,495 objects in 2014 including an iconotheque of about 700,000 pieces (plus a mediatheque of 260,000 and archives)
3. Penn Museum, Philadelphia, PA, USA.
  The Museum houses over 1.35 million objects, with one of the most comprehensive collections and Middle and Near-Eastern art in the world.
4. Peter the Great Museum of Anthropology and Ethnography (Kunstkamera), St. Petersburg, Russia
  1 117,000 objects
5. University of Cambridge Museum of Archaeology and Anthropology, Cambridge, UK
  800,000 objects
6. Phoebe Hearst Museum of Anthropology, Berkeley, California, USA
  634,000 objects (In addition to Africa, Americas & Oceania, the museum embraces holdings from Europe, Ancient Mediterranean, Ancient Egypt, Asia and a large media collection)
7. Pitt Rivers Museum, Oxford, UK
  500,000 objects
8. Musée de l'Homme, Paris, France
  500,000 objects
9. Ethnological Museum, Berlin, Germany
  500,000 objects (In addition to Africa, Americas & Oceania, the museum embraces holdings from Asia (South, South-East, Far-East and North Asia), the Islamic World, the Children's Museum and the Museum for the Blind.)
10. Russian Museum of Ethnography, St. Petersburg, Russia
  500,000 objects
11. British Museum, London, UK
  350,000 objects
12. National Museum of Ethnology (Japan), Osaka, Japan
  335,000 objects
13. National Museum of Ethnology (Netherlands), Leiden, Netherlands
  200,000 objects with 500,000 pieces in the image and multimedia libraries and 40,000 books.
14. Museum für Völkerkunde, Vienna, Austria
  200,000 objects
15. Staatliches Museum für Völkerkunde, Munich, Germany
  150,000 objects
16. Museo Nacional de Antropología (National Museum of Anthropology), Mexico City, Mexico
  120,000 objects
17. American Museum of Natural History Division of Anthropology, New York, USA
  119,000 objects
18. Anima Mundi, Vatican City
  80,000 objects
19. Horniman Museum, London, UK
  80,000 objects
20. Museum of Anthropology at the University of British Columbia, Vancouver, BC, Canada
  36,000 ethnographic objects and 535,000 archaeological objects
21. Powell Cotton Museum, Kent, UK
  30,000 objects
22. Indiana University Museum of Archaeology and Anthropology, Indiana University, Bloomington, Indiana, USA
  Over 30,000 ethnographic objects and 10,000 photographs
23. Xalapa Museum of Anthropology, Xalapa, Mexico.
  25,000 objets
24. Museu Antropológico Diretor Pestana (Brazil), Ijuí, Santa Cataria, Brazil,
  29,000 objects
25. Ethnological Museum, Addis Ababa
  13,000 items
26. Berndt Museum of Anthropology, Perth, Australia
  11,500 items
27. Metropolitan Museum of Art, New York City, New York, USA
  11,000 objects
28. Wooden Spoons Museum, Câmpulung Moldovenesc, Romania
  Over 6,000 objects
