= Robert Davidson (artist) =

Canadian artist (born 1946)

Robert Charles Davidson
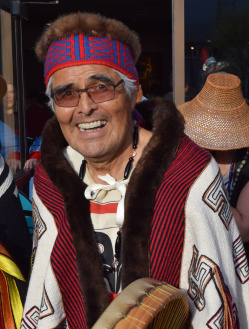
- Davidson in 2016
- Born: 4 November 1946 (age 79); Hydaburg, Alaska
- Known for: carver, printmaker, painter, jewellery maker
- Website: www.robertdavidson.ca

Robert Charles Davidson OC OBC RCA (born 4 November 1946), is a Canadian artist of Haida heritage. Davidson's Haida name is G̲uud San Glans, which means "Eagle of the Dawn". He is a leading figure in the renaissance of Haida art and culture. He lives in White Rock, British Columbia.

== Life and work ==
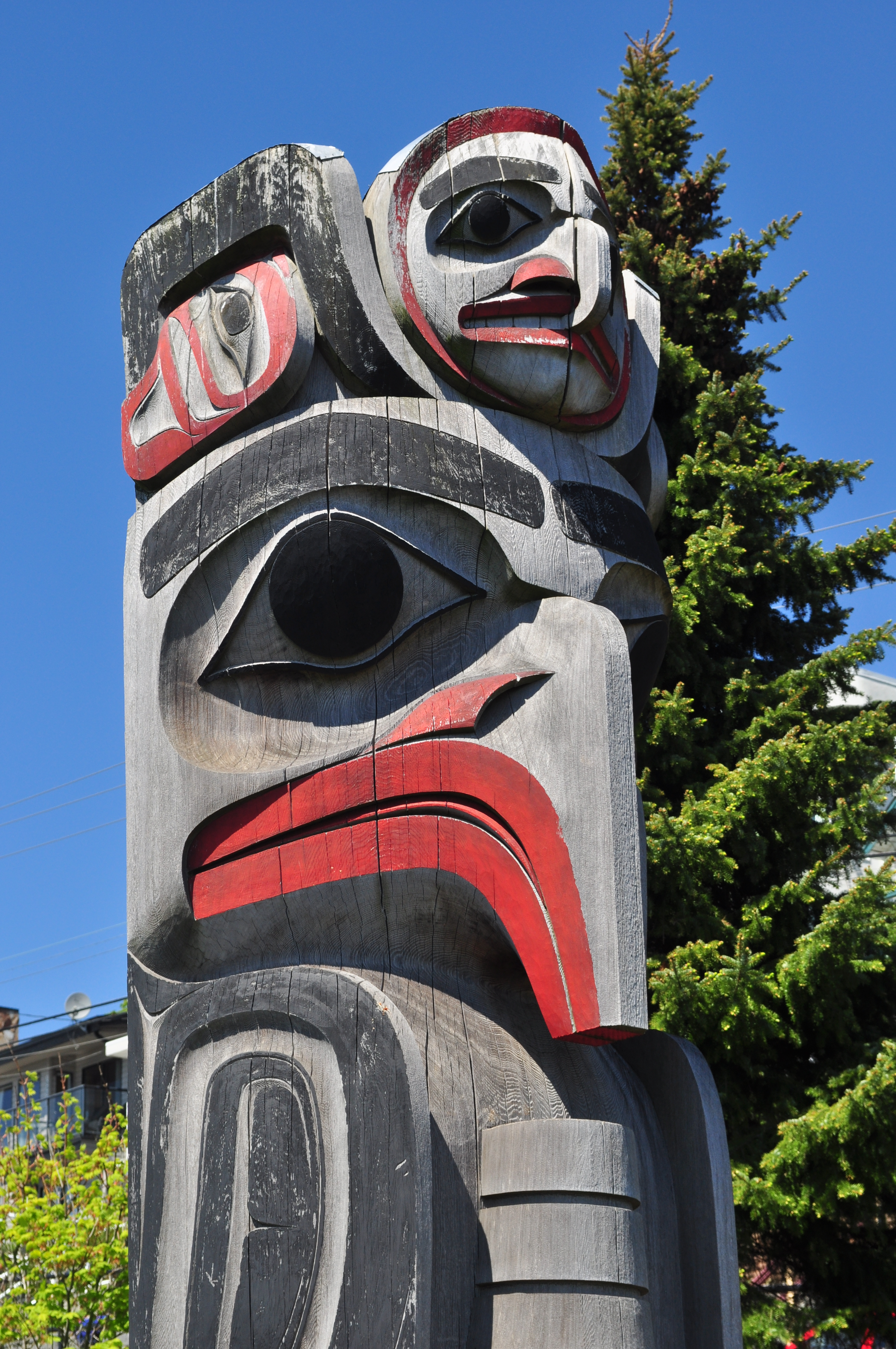
Detail of "Gyaana", totem pole designed by Davidson and carved by him and others, Lions Lookout Park, White Rock, British Columbia, Canada.

Davidson is known internationally as a carver of totem poles and masks, printmaker, painter and jeweller. He lives near Vancouver, working out of a studio on Semiahmoo First Nation land and making annual return visits to Haida Gwaii.

Davidson was born in Hydaburg, Alaska. His parents are Claude and Vivian Davidson. Through Claude, he is the grandson of the Haida artist and memoirist Florence Davidson. He is a member of the Eagle moiety, Ts'ał'lanas lineage. His younger brother and former apprentice, Reg Davidson, is also a Haida carver.

In infancy, Robert Davidson moved with his family to the Haida village of Masset, British Columbia, on Haida Gwaii (Queen Charlotte Islands). For high school, he moved to Vancouver to attend Point Grey Secondary School in 1965. In 1966 he became apprenticed to the master Haida carver Bill Reid. In 1967 he began studies at the Vancouver School of Art. In 1969 he carved and raised the first totem pole on Haida Gwaii in approximately ninety years.

His works are included in the collections of the National Gallery of Canada, the Canadian Museum of Civilization and the Vancouver Art Gallery. His style, which engages with both Haida and Western art history, has been described as "contemporary-traditional", reflecting an overlap of "community-based and outsider-orientated" artistic projects.

A significant solo exhibition of his work, Robert Davidson: The Abstract Edge, was organized by the Museum of Anthropology at the University of British Columbia (UBC) for viewing at the National Gallery of Canada in Ottawa in 2007. From November 2022 until April 2023 the Vancouver Art Gallery is presenting an exhibition with the title A Line That Bends But Does Not Break, showcasing a collection of Davidson's graphic work, including paintings from private collections.

Robert Davidson was the subject of the documentary Haida Modern, which premiered at the Vancouver International Film Festival in 2019. He also appeared in Eugene Boyko's 1970 short documentary film This Was the Time, and Christopher Auchter's 2019 short documentary film Now Is the Time.

== Awards and recognition ==
- Honorary Doctor of Fine Arts, University of Victoria, 1992
- Honorary Doctor of Laws, Simon Fraser University, 1994
- Order of British Columbia, 1995
- National Aboriginal Achievement Award, now the Indspire Awards, 1995
- Member of the Order of Canada, 1996
- Honorary Doctor of Letters (D.Litt.), University of British Columbia, 2007
- Aboriginal Art Lifetime Achievement Awards, BC Achievement Foundation, 2007
- Governor General's Awards in Visual and Media Arts, Canada Council, 2010
- Member, Royal Canadian Academy of Arts
- The Audain Prize for Lifetime Achievement in the Visual Arts, 2010

If we look at the world in the form of a circle, let us look at what is on the inside of the circle as experience, culture and knowledge: Let us look at this as the past. What is outside of the circle is yet to be experienced. But in order to expand the circle we must know what is inside the circle.

— guud san glans, Robert Davidson
