= Sewell (name) =

Sewell (/ˈsjuːəl/) is both a surname and a given name, derived from the Middle English personal names Sewal (Siwal) or Sewald (Siwald). As a toponymic surname, it may have originally referred to people of Sewell, Bedfordshire or other places named Sewell, Showell, or Seawell.

== Notable people with the given name "Sewell" include ==
- Sewell Avery (1874–1960), American businessman
- Sewell Chan (born 1977), American journalist
- Sewell Collins (1876–1934), American playwright
- Sewell Foster (1792–1868), Canadian physician
- Sewell Jones (1897–1981), American football coach
- Sewell Moody (1834–1875), American merchant
- Sewell A. Peterson (1850–1915), American politician
- Sewell Sillman (1924–1992), American painter
- Sewell Stokes (1902–1979), British writer and broadcaster

== Notable people with the surname "Sewell" include ==
=== A ===
- A. E. Sewell (1872–1946), English architect
- Albert Sewell (1927–2018), English statistician
- Alice Maud Sewell (1881–1971), Australian activist
- Almondo Sewell (born 1987), American football player
- Amanda Brewster Sewell (1859–1926), American painter
- Amy Sewell (born 1963), American author
- Andy Sewell (born 1978), British photographer
- Anna Sewell (1820–1878), British writer
- Anthony Sewell (1962–2009), American motocross racer
- Arthur Sewell (disambiguation), multiple people

=== B ===
- Barton Sewell (~1848–1915), American mining businessperson
- Barton Sewell II (1905–1953), heir involved in highly publicized divorce
- Bill Sewell (disambiguation), multiple people
- Blanche Sewell (1898–1949), American film editor
- Brad Sewell (born 1984), Australian rules footballer
- Brian Sewell (1931–2015), English art critic
- Briana Sewell (born 1990), American politician
- Brocard Sewell (1912–2000), British monk
- Bruce Sewell (born 1957/1958), American corporate executive

=== C ===
- Cecil Sewell (1895–1918), British Army lieutenant
- Cissie Sewell (1893–??), American educator
- Conrad Sewell (born 1988), Australian singer
- Cyril Sewell (1874–1951), South African-English cricketer

=== D ===
- Daisy Elizabeth McQuigg Sewell (1876–1944), American religious leader
- Damani Sewell (born 1994), Jamaican cricketer
- Daniel Dewan Sewell (born 1981), American rapper
- Danny Sewell (1930–2001), British boxer
- David Sewell (born 1977), New Zealand cricketer
- Dean Sewell (born 1972), Jamaican footballer
- Dean Sewell (photographer) (born 1972), Australian photographer
- Doug Sewell (1929–2017), English golfer

=== E ===
- E. G. Sewell (1874–1940), American politician
- E. H. D. Sewell (1872–1947), English cricketer
- Elizabeth Sewell (disambiguation), multiple people
- Elyse Sewell (born 1982), American fashion model
- Emmer Sewell (born 1934), American artist

=== F ===
- Francis Hill Sewell (1815–1862), English clergyman
- Frederick Sewell (1881–1964), English cricketer

=== G ===
- Geoff Sewell (born 1972), New Zealand tenor
- George Sewell (disambiguation), multiple people
- Gillian Sewell (born 1972), Irish-Canadian field hockey player
- Granville Sewell, American mathematician
- Greg Sewell (born 1933), Australian rules footballer

=== H ===
- Harley Sewell (1931–2011), American football player
- Harry Sewell (1885–1953), British steeple chaser
- Hazel Sewell (1898–1975), American animator
- Helen Sewell (1896–1957), American illustrator
- Henry Sewell (1807–1879), New Zealand politician
- Henry Sewell (cricketer) (born 1935), Jamaican cricketer
- Horace Sewell (1881–1953), British army officer

=== I ===
- Ike Sewell (1903–1990), American entrepreneur

=== J ===
- Jack Sewell (1913–2000), English cricketer
- Jack Sewell (rugby league) (1926–1955), English rugby league footballer
- Jackie Sewell (1927–2016), English footballer
- Jameel Sewell (born 1987), American football player
- James Sewell (disambiguation), multiple people
- Jim Sewell (born 1955), Australian rules footballer
- Joe Sewell (1898–1990), American baseball player
- John Sewell (disambiguation), multiple people
- Jonathan Sewell (1766–1839), Canadian politician
- Joseph Sewell, English footballer
- Josh Sewell (born 1981), American football player

=== K ===
- Karen Sewell (born 1944/1945), New Zealand educator
- Keechant Sewell (born 1972), American police officer

=== L ===
- Larry Sewell (born 1948), New Zealand cricketer
- LaVerne Sewell (1888–1906), American jockey
- Leo Sewell (born 1945), American visual artist
- Luke Sewell (1901–1987), American baseball player

=== M ===
- Margaret Sewell (1852–1937), English educator
- Marvin Sewell, American guitarist
- Mary A. Sewell (born 1963), New Zealand marine biologist
- Mary Wright Sewell (1797–1884), British author
- Matt Sewell (born 1990), Canadian football player
- Morley Sewell (1932–2022), British veterinarian

=== N ===
- Nephi Sewell (born 1998), American football player
- Nicole Sewell (born 1981), Australian tennis player
- Noah Sewell (born 2002), American football player

=== P ===
- Penei Sewell (born 2000), American football player

=== R ===
- R. B. Seymour Sewell (1880–1964), British doctor
- Richard Clarke Sewell (1803–1864), English lawyer
- Rip Sewell (1907–1989), American baseball player
- Robert Sewell (disambiguation), multiple people
- Robin Sewell (born 1979), South African dancer
- Ronnie Sewell (1890–1945), English footballer
- Rufus Sewell (born 1967), English actor

=== S ===
- Shane Sewell (born 1972), Canadian professional wrestler
- Sicily Sewell (born 1985), American actress
- Stephen Sewell (disambiguation), multiple people
- Steve Sewell (born 1963), American football player

=== T ===
- Terri Sewell (born 1965), American politician
- Thomas Sewell (disambiguation), multiple people
- Timothy Toyne Sewell (born 1941), British army officer
- Tommy Sewell (1906–1956), American baseball player
- Tony Sewell (born 1959), British educator and life peer

=== V ===
- Valentine Sewell (1910–1978), English cricketer
- Vernon Sewell (1903–2001), British film director

=== W ===
- William Sewell (disambiguation), multiple people

== See also ==
- Sewell (disambiguation), a disambiguation page for "Sewell"
- Attorney General Sewell (disambiguation), a disambiguation page for Attorney Generals surnamed "Sewell"
- General Sewell (disambiguation), a disambiguation page for Generals surnamed "Sewell"
