= Sewell =

Sewell may refer to:

- Sewell (name), a surname and given name, including lists of people with the name
- Sewell, Bedfordshire
- Sewell, Chile
- Sewell, New Jersey
- Sewell's Point, Norfolk, Virginia, United States
- 22815 Sewell, an asteroid

== See also ==
- Sewall, British Columbia, Canada, sometimes misspelled Sewell
- Sewall, a surname
- Seawell, a surname
- Sewel (disambiguation)
- Suwellel, a vernacular name of the mountain beaver (Aplodontia rufa)
- Swell (disambiguation)
- Sowell
