= Vis-en-Artois Memorial =

- Commonwealth War Graves Commission
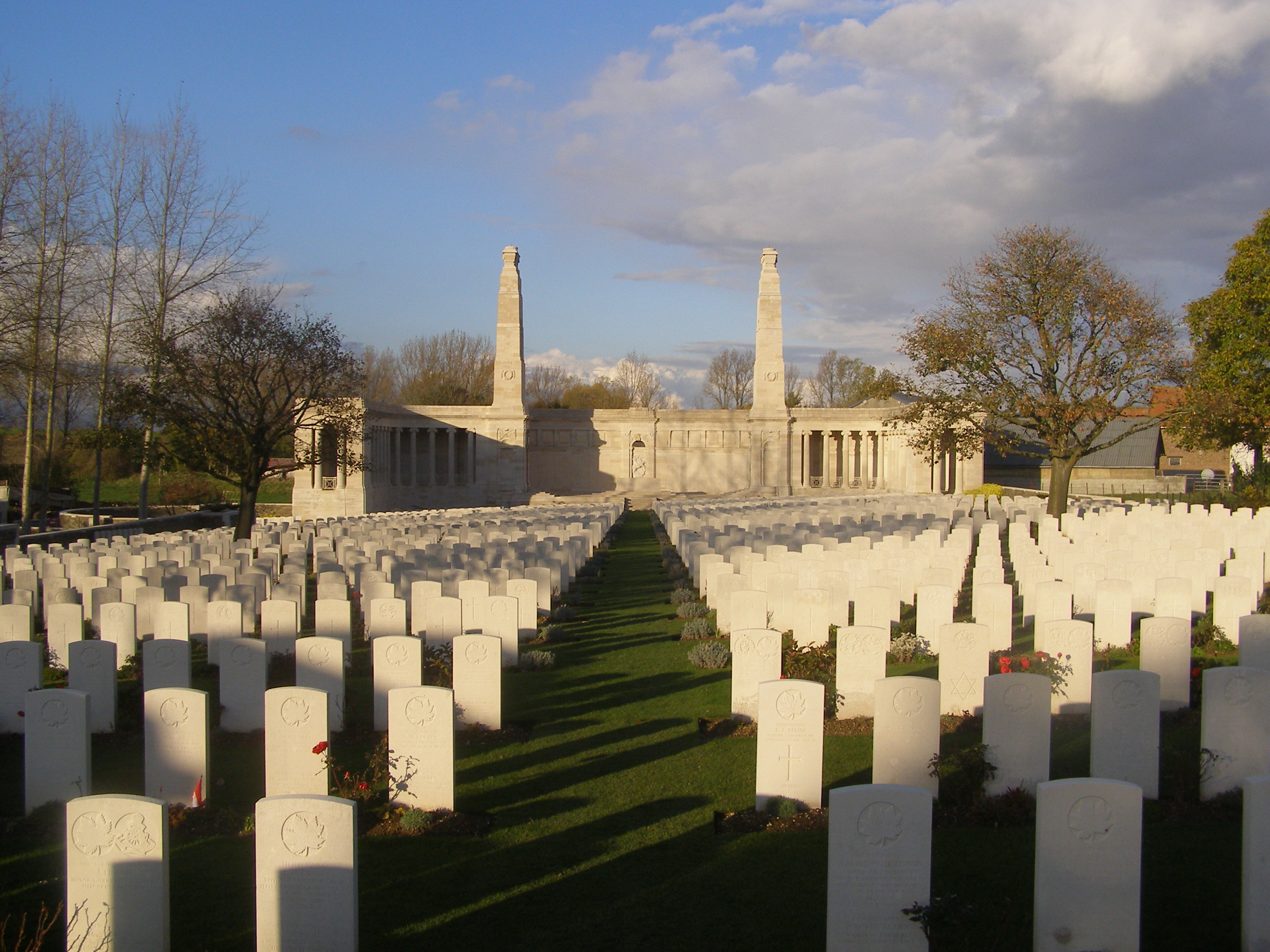
- View of the cemetery with the memorial in the background
- For forces of the United Kingdom and South Africa
- Unveiled: 4 August 1930
- Location: 50°14′46.56″N 02°57′00.47″E
- Designed by: J. R. Truelove (architect); Ernest Gillick (sculptor)
- To the Glory of God and to the memory of 9903 officers and men of the forces of Great Britain, Ireland and South Africa who fell during the Advance to Victory in Artois and Picardy whose names are here recorded but to whom the fortune of war denied the known and honoured burial given to their comrades in death.

The Vis-en-Artois Memorial is a World War I memorial located near the commune of Vis-en-Artois, in the Pas-de-Calais département of France. The memorial lists 9,843 names of British and South African soldiers with no known grave who were killed during the Advance to Victory, from 8 August 1918 to the Armistice (11 November 1918). The area of the frontline covered is described as "in Picardy and Artois, between the Somme and Loos". Canadian, Australian and New Zealand forces that fell during this period and were not found, are commemorated elsewhere on other memorials to the missing.

The memorial has a screen wall in three parts on which are carved the names of the missing listed by regiment. The central screen is flanked by 70-foot high columns, with a Stone of Remembrance at centre. The carvings include one representing St George and the Dragon. The memorial was designed by the architect J. R. Truelove, with sculpture by Ernest Gillick. The memorial was unveiled on 4 August 1930 by the Rt. Hon. Thomas Shaw. Shaw, a Labour Party MP and cabinet minister, was present in his role as British Secretary of State for War. Also present was General Walter Braithwaite, who had served in the Mediterranean and on the Western Front during the war.

== See also ==
- Vis-en-Artois British Cemetery, Haucourt
