= Mary Sewell =

Mary Sewell may refer to:

- Mary A. Sewell (born 1963), New Zealand marine biology academic
- Mary Wright Sewell (1797–1884), English poet and children's author
- Mary Young Sewell (c. 1759–1821), British poet
