= Cyril Biddulph =

Canadian actor (1887–1918)

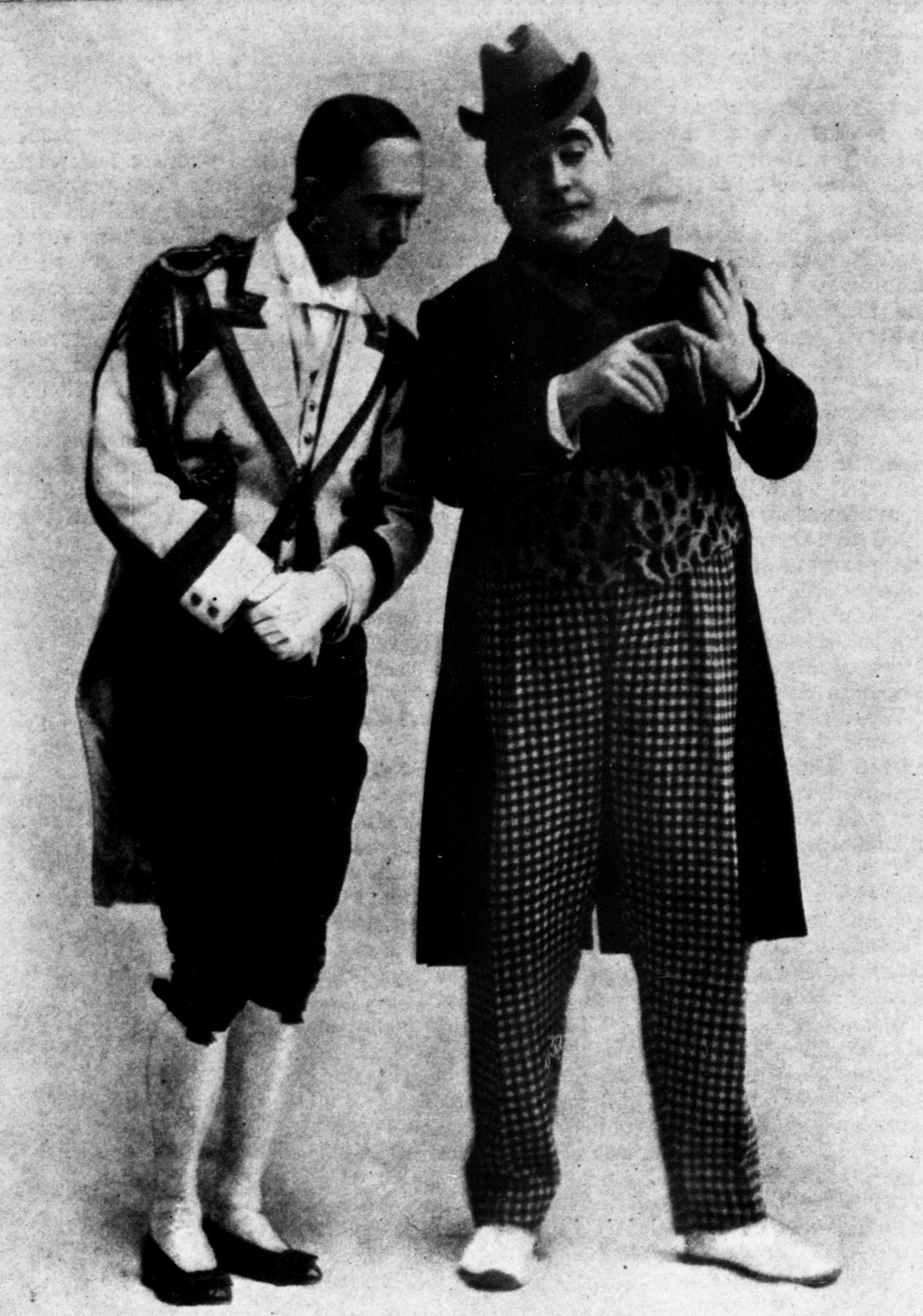
Cyril Biddulph (left) and William Welsh (right) from photo on page 24 of Harper's Weekly, April 30, 1910 Vol 54 Iss 2784.

Cyril Biddulph (28 January 1887 – 26 August 1918) was a Canadian stage actor who frequently performed in the United States.

== Life ==
Cyril Biddulph was born 28 January 1887 on the British military base Curragh Camp in County Kildare, Ireland. In the 1901 United Kingdom census Biddulph is listed as a steward on the British vessel Langton Grange, which was at port at the West India Docks in London at the time of the census. Later Biddulph moved to New York City where he found employment as an actor. He appeared in numerous productions across the United States in the early 1910s, including performances on Broadway and at the National Theatre in Washington, D.C. His last appearance on stage in the United States was in the fall of 1914, months after the First World War began.

Biddulph returned to Canada and on 7 December 1915 he enlisted in the Canadian Expeditionary Force. His original unit was the 5th University Company, but on 16 September 1916 he joined Princess Patricia's Canadian Light Infantry regiment based out of eastern Ontario as a private. On 29 December 1916 he was commissioned as a lieutenant. On 26 August 1918 Biddulph was killed leading his battalion into action in Pas-de-Calais near the communes of Vis-en-Artois and Haucourt. The next day Vis-en-Artois and Haucourt were taken by the Canadians. Biddulph was buried in the Vis-en-Artois British Cemetery, Haucourt in plot VI. A. 12.

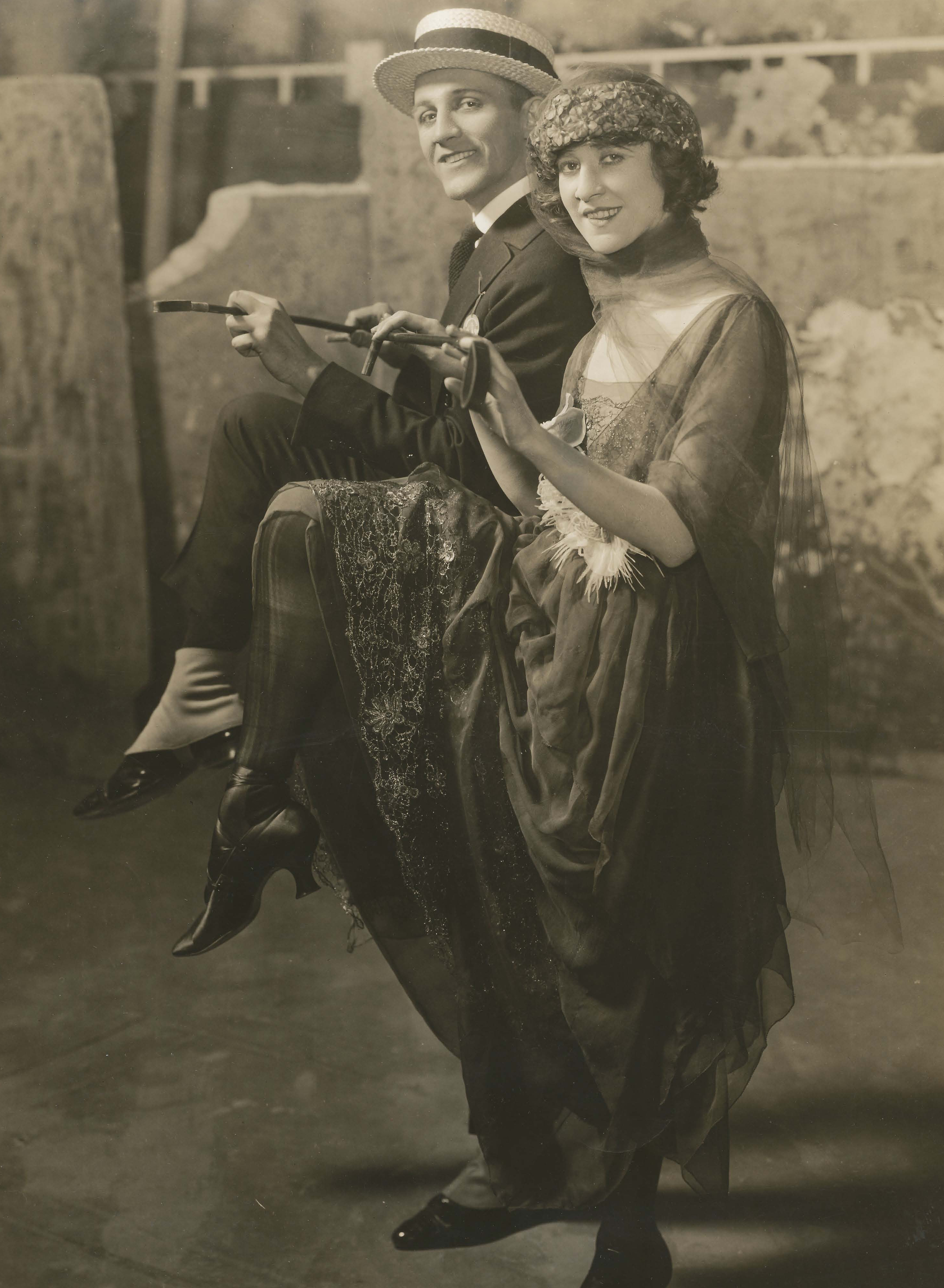
Photo of Cyril Biddulph's wife, Cissie Sewell, and Mercer Templeton in 1920 production of Honey Girl.

Biddulph was married to Broadway actress Cissie Sewell. In 1920, when fire broke out in the Boston hotel where she was staying, she delayed her evacuation until she rescued a photograph of her late husband, "disregard[ing] her valuable jewels, clothing and bonds". Ellis Island immigration records state that Sewell remained an unmarried widow through at least 1923.

== Partial list of stage performances ==
- October 1914 – Evidence at Lyric Theatre in New York City.
- October–November 1913 – The Great Adventure at Booth Theatre in New York.
- March 1912 – The Siren at the Colonial Theatre in Boston.
- October–December 1911 – Uncle Sam at Liberty Theatre and Gaiety Theatre in New York.
- March 1911 – The Dollar Princess at the National Theatre in Washington, D.C.
