= Shrinkage =

Shrinkage may refer to:

== Reduction in size of a solid material ==
- Shrinkage (casting), size reduction of liquid metal as it solidifies
- Shrinkage (concrete), size reduction of concrete as it sets and ages
- Shrinkage (fabric), size reduction of fabric when washed with water or hot water
- Shrinkage (wood), size reduction of wood as it dries

== Other uses ==
- Shrinkage (accounting), loss of product inventory due to theft, damage, spoilage, etc.
- Shrinkage defect or shrinkage void, a casting defect caused by metal solidifying from the outside inward
- Shrinkage (statistics), a technique to improve an estimator
- Shrinkage (slang)

== See also ==
- Degrowth
- Downsizing (disambiguation)
- Human penis size
- Miniaturization
- Resizing (fiction)
- Shrink (disambiguation)
- Swelling (disambiguation) (opposite of shrinkage)
