= John Sewell (disambiguation) =

John Sewell (born 1940) is a Canadian political activist and writer; mayor of Toronto, 1978–1980.

John Sewell may also refer to:

- John Sewell (athlete) (1882–1947), Scottish tug of war competitor
- John Sewell (Miami) (1867–1938), third Mayor of Miami, Florida
- John Sewell (footballer) (born 1936), English footballer who played during the 1970s
- John Sewell (cricketer) (1844–1897), English cricketer
- John Sewell (publisher) (1735–1802), English bookseller, printer, and publisher of European Magazine
- Jackie Sewell (1927–2016), English footballer
- Jack Sewell (rugby league) (1926–1955), rugby league footballer of the 1940s and 1950s

== See also ==
- John Sewel, Baron Sewel (born 1946), British academic and politician
- Jack Sewell (Frederic John Sewell, 1913–2000), English cricketer of the 1930s
