= Elizabeth Sewell =

Elizabeth Sewell may refer to:

- Elizabeth Sewell (writer) (1919–2001), British-American critic, poet and novelist
- Elizabeth Sewell (activist) (1940–1988), New Zealand activist
- Elizabeth Anesta Sewell (1872–1959), Welsh-born writer
- Elizabeth Missing Sewell (1815–1906), English author of religious and educational texts
- Cissie Sewell (died 1954), English dancer
