= Vis-en-Artois British Cemetery, Haucourt =

Cemetery located in Pas-de-Calais, in France

Vis-en-Artois British Cemetery and Memorial
- Commonwealth War Graves Commission
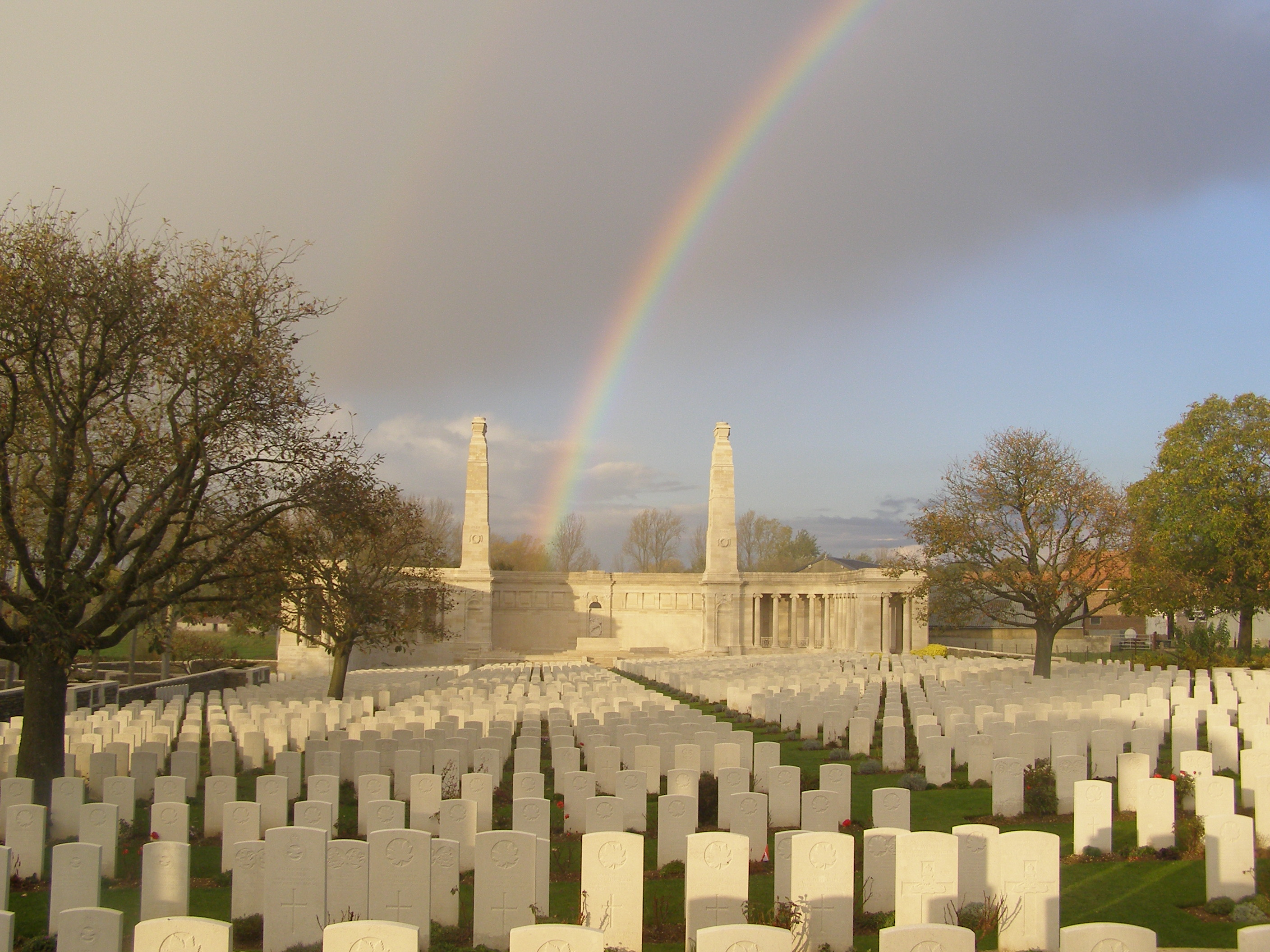
- Used for those deceased 1915–1918
- Established: 1918
- Location: 50°14′46″N 2°57′0″E near Vis-en-Artois, France
- Designed by: J R Truelove
- Total burials: 2,369
- Unknowns: 1,458

Burials by nation
- Allied Powers: United Kingdom: 1,748; Canada: 582; Australia: 6; South Africa: 2

Burials by war
- World War I: 2,369
- Statistics source: Cemetery details. Commonwealth War Graves Commission. Vis-en-Artois Cemetery

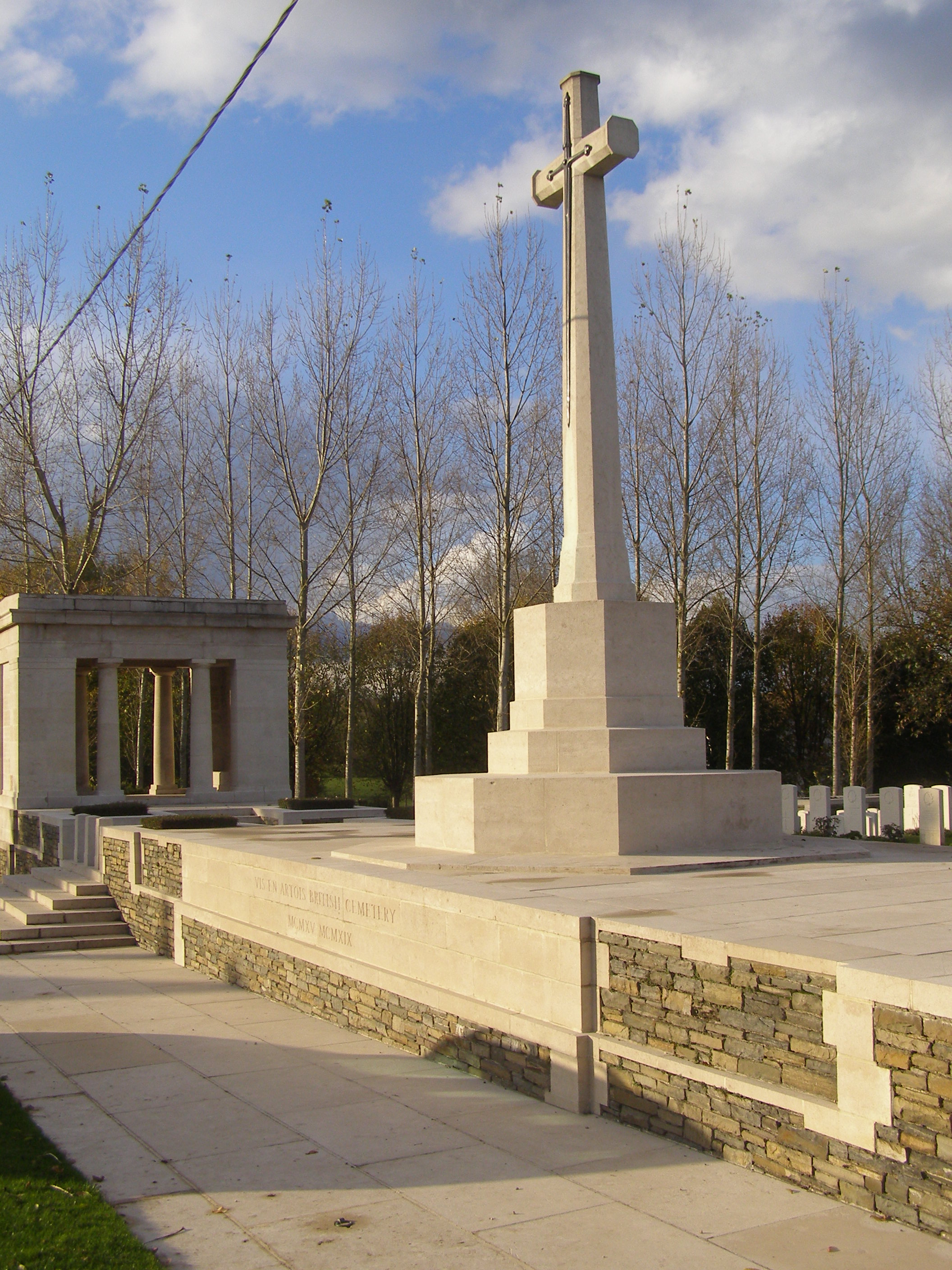
Cross of Sacrifice

The Vis-en-Artois British Cemetery, Haucourt is a Commonwealth War Graves Commission (CWGC) burial ground for the dead of World War I located between the communes of Vis-en-Artois and Haucourt in the département of Pas-de-Calais, France. It lies on the D939 east of Arras.

== History ==
The area was captured by the Canadian Corps in late August 1918 and the cemetery was opened soon after and was in use until after the armistice with reburials from the battlefield.

== Vis-en-Artois Memorial ==
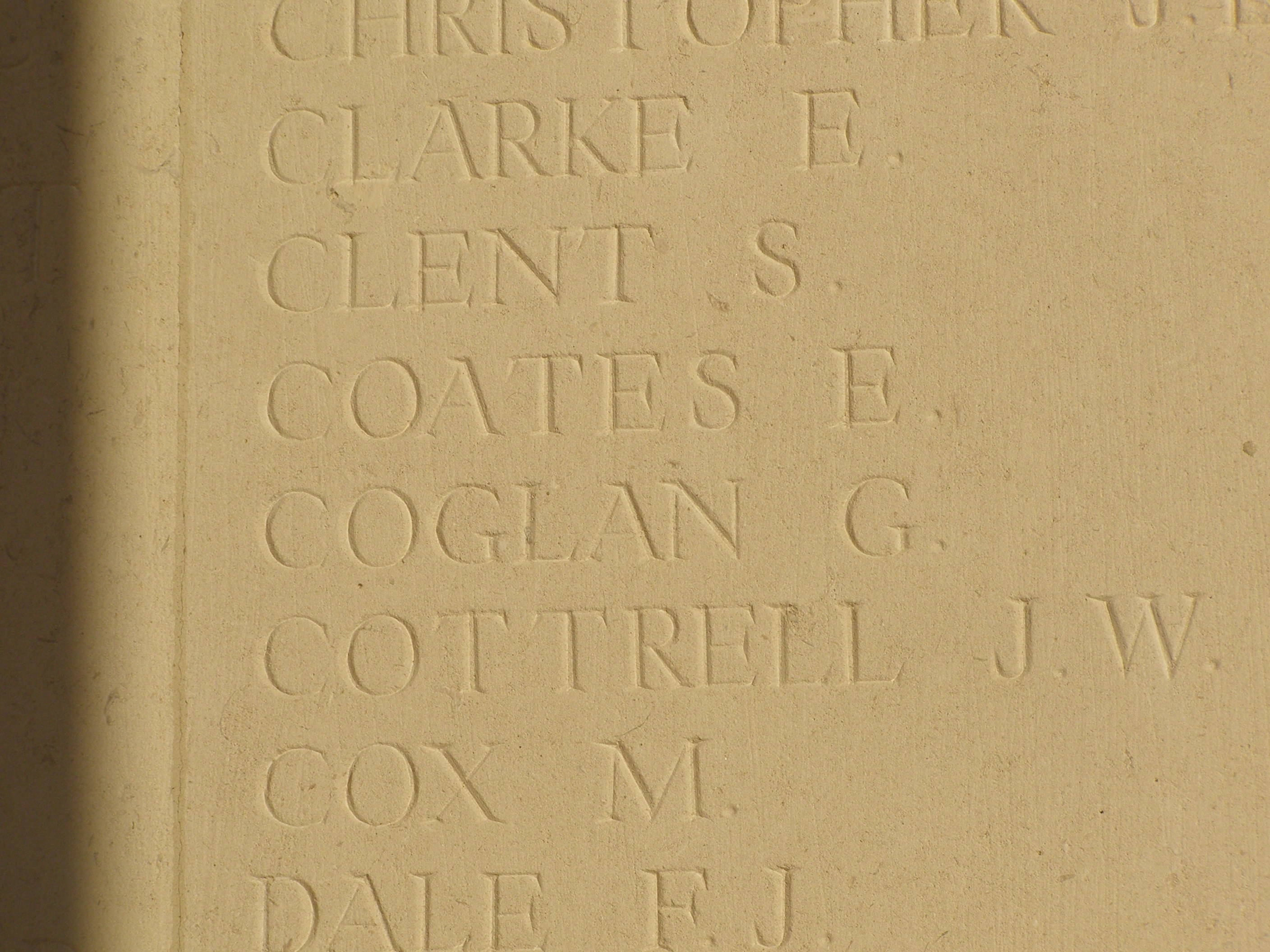
Detail from one of the memorial panels

Located in the cemetery is the Vis-en-Artois Memorial which lists the names of 9,813 men (9,806 British and 16 South African) who fell from 8 August 1918 to the Armistice and who have no known grave. The memorial has a screen walls in three parts on which is carved the names of the missing listed by regiment. The memorial was designed by British sculptor Ernest Gillick.

== Notable Graves ==
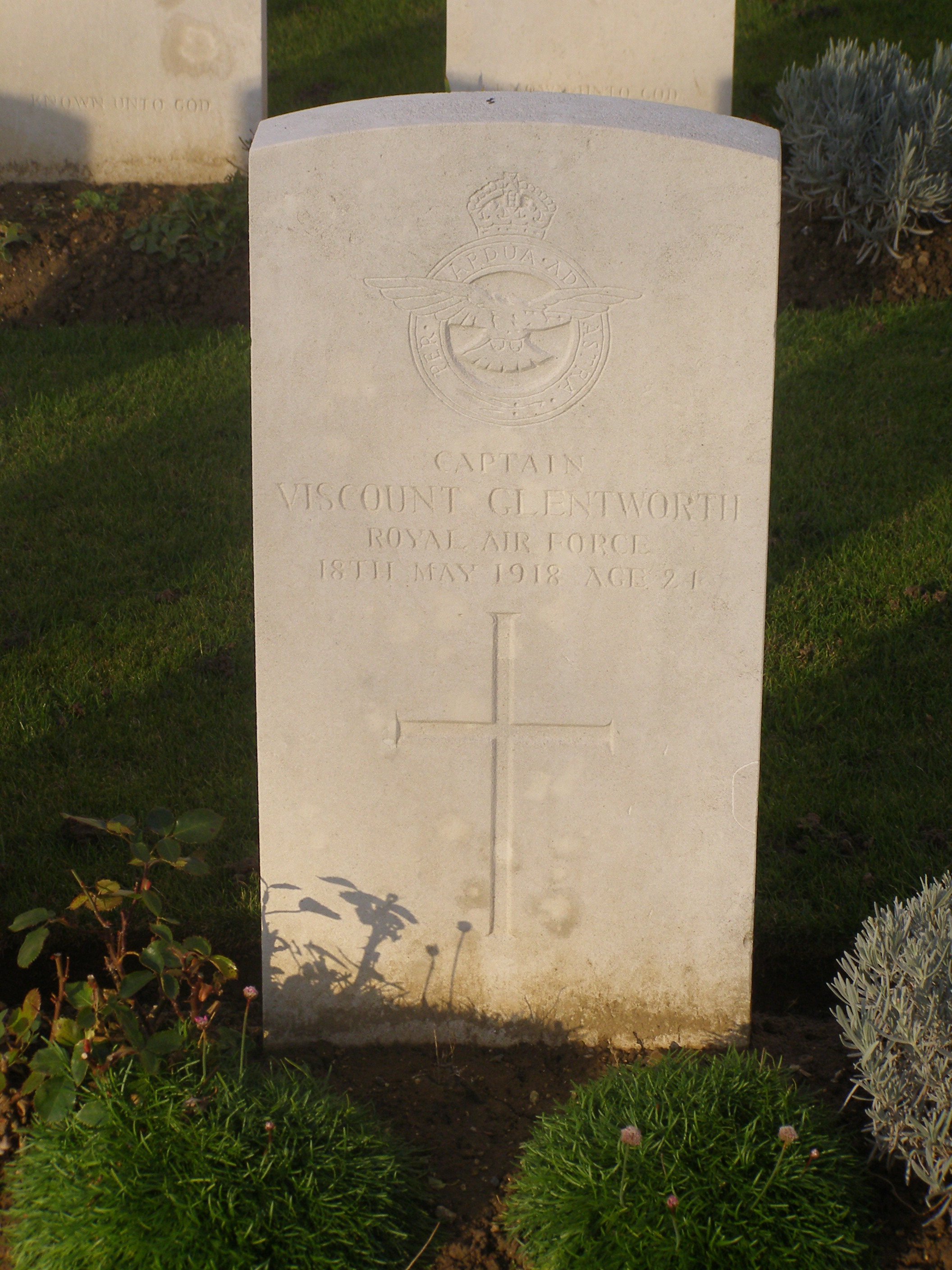
Grave of Viscount Glentworth

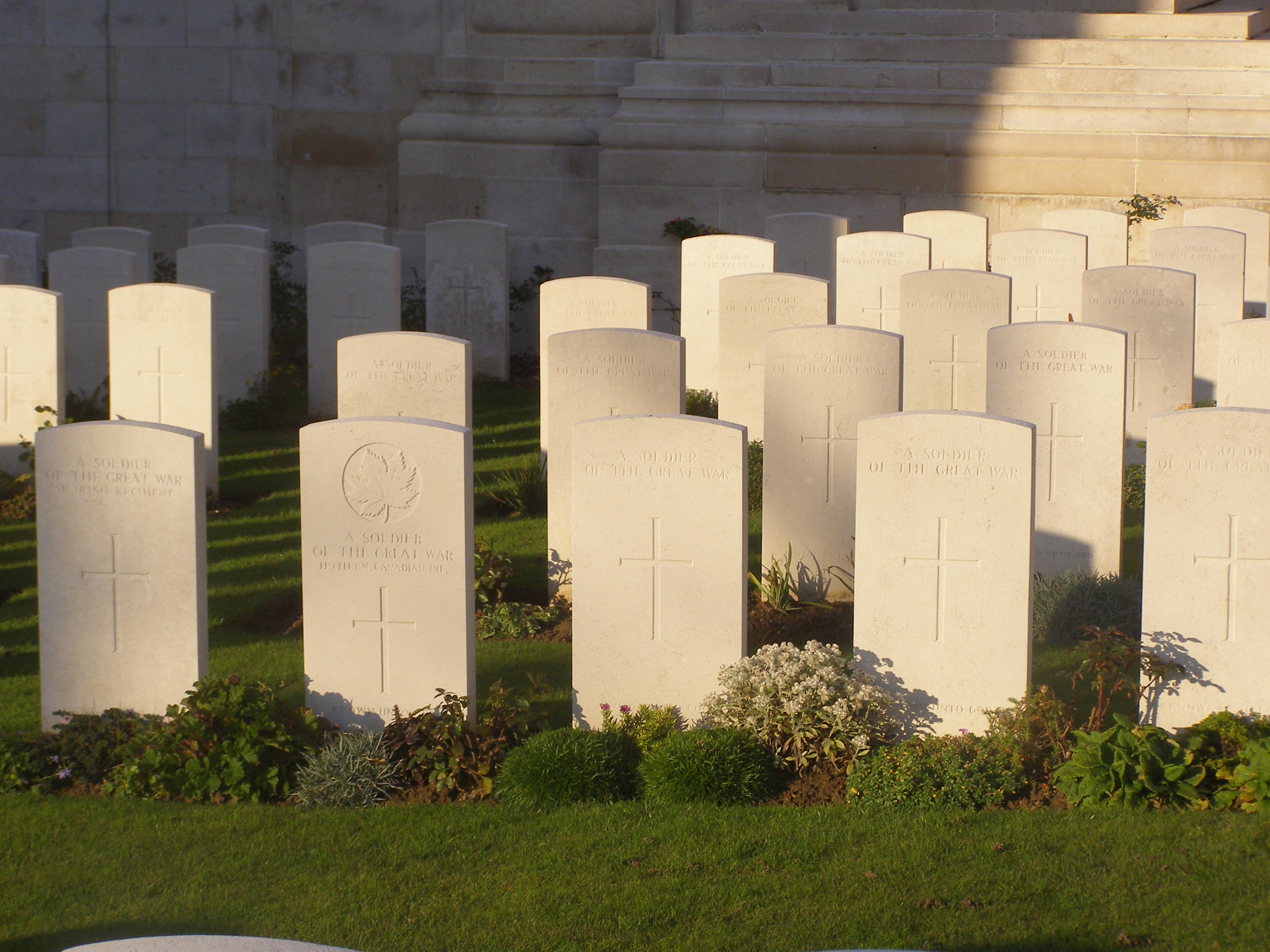
Graves of unknown soldiers

- Cyril Biddulph
- Allan Leonard Lewis
