= Swell =

Swell may refer to:

== In nature ==
- Swell, another name for a geographic hillock
- Swell (ocean), a formation of long wavelength ocean surface waves
- Swell (geology), a large domed area

== Places ==
- Swell, Somerset, a hamlet in the Somerset parish of Fivehead
- Swell, Gloucestershire, England

== Music ==
- Expression pedal, a control found on many organs and synthesizers, also called a swell box or swell pedal
- Swell (band), an indie rock band from San Francisco
- Swell, album by Psyched Up Janis
- Swell, album by Tiny Moving Parts
- Swell Maps, an experimental English rock group of the 1970s

== People ==
- George Gilbert Swell (1923–1999), Indian academic and politician
- Steve Swell (born 1954), American musician, composer and educator
- Steven Wells (1960–2009), punk poet and journalist known as Swells

== Other uses ==
- Swell (bookbinding), a term in bookbinding
- Swell (gum), a brand of chewing gum produced by Philadelphia Gum
- Swell (exhibit), an art exhibition
- Swell, another word for a dandy, fop, or macaroni
- Swell, a slang term for "good", "cool", or "nifty"
- Swell Radio, a former radio streaming application
- S'well, reusable water bottle company

== See also ==
- Swelling (disambiguation)
- Swelling (medical)
- Swell shark, a catshark
- Swell Foop, a book by Piers Anthony
- Sewell (disambiguation)
