= Shrink =

Shrink may refer to:

== Common meanings ==
- Miniaturization
- Shrink, a slang term for:
  - a mental health professional
  - a psychiatrist
  - a psychoanalyst
  - a psychologist
  - a psychotherapist
- Shrinkage (accounting), sometimes shortened to 'shrink'

== Arts, entertainment, and media ==
- Shrink (album), album by German indie rock/electronica group The Notwist
- Shrink (film), independent drama film starring Kevin Spacey
- Shrink, also known as Experiment 001, a fictional genetic experiment from the Lilo & Stitch franchise
- Primal Scream (1998), the sixth book in the Special X series by Michael Slade
- Shrink (TV series), a 2017 American comedy series
- Shrinks (TV series), a 1991 British drama series
- Shrinking, a 2023 American comedy series
- Shrink, a Yu-Gi-Oh! card, printed in the TCG as a Shonen Jump Championship promo

== Other uses ==
- Resizing (fiction), or shrink

== See also ==
- Shrinkage (disambiguation)
- Psych (disambiguation)
