= Michael Nicoll Yahgulanaas =

North Pacific artist

- Born: 1954 (age 71–72)
- Known for: creating a new genre of manga, Painting, sculpture, publications
- Notable work: RED, a Haida Manga; Coppers from the Hood; Pedal to the Meddle
- Movement: Indigenous art, Haida manga
- Website: mny.ca

Michael Nicoll Yahgulanaas is a visual artist and author, with art in international and public spaces and private collections. Major museum collections in North America and Europe include the British Museum, the Quai Branly Museum, the Smithsonian's National Museum of the American Indian, Metropolitan Museum of Art, Seattle Art Museum, Denver Art Museum, Vancouver Art Gallery, and the Humboldt Forum.

Yahgulanaas has a long history of community service supporting progressive financial and political developments involving Indigenous Peoples, philanthropic organizations, and governments in North America and internationally.

== Early life ==
Michael Nicoll Yahgulanaas was born in Prince Rupert, British Columbia in 1954 and grew up alongside Delkatla, near the fishing village of Masset on Haida Gwaii, off the north coast of British Columbia. He is a descendant of the influential Haida artists, Isabella Edenshaw, Charles Edenshaw and Delores Churchill

As a young artist, he covered the walls and ceilings of his bedroom with drawings. He is the eldest grandson of 7laanaas Auu Gala, Oliver Adams, who was the Hereditary Chief of Massett. The presence and status of the Arts in this community were important influences. At age 22, he began to direct his artistic endeavors outward, to effect change in the community and in relation to broader movements of environmental activism.

== Art career ==
=== Training ===
In 1978, Yahgulanaas began his formal training in the classical forms of Haida art; Yahgulanaas became a full-time artist after several decades working to protect the biocultural diversity of Haida Gwaii.

=== Haida manga ===
While Yahgulanaas trained under master carvers, his brief exposure to Chinese brush techniques with Cantonese artist Cai Ben Kwan in the 1990s encouraged a departure from the typical expressions of the Haida art form and the development of a new genre of narrative art called "Haida manga".

Haida Manga blends Pacific Northwest Indigenous iconographies and framelines with the graphic dynamism of Asian manga. Haida Manga is committed to hybridity as a force that opens a third space for critical engagement. It offers a way of viewing and engaging with social issues as it seeks participation, dialogue, reflection, and action.

=== Sculpture ===
Yahgulanaas's works in metal include commissions from the British Museum (2010). As of September 2026, the British Museum in London continues to exhibit their Yahgulanaas sculpture on the main floor gallery. The City of Vancouver (2011) commissioned what is their largest public art sculpture installed at the intersection of Knight and 33rd streets. The 2010 Winter Olympics commissioned a work and installed it on the grounds of the University of British Columbia at the entrance to the Thunderbird Stadium. In 2015, the Yahgulanaas sculpture Sei, a 12 ton stainless sculpture depicting a sei whale, was unveiled at the Vancouver International Airport. In January 2016, the platinum leafed Yaris car hood Yelthadaas from the Coppers From the Hood series joined the permanent collection at the Metropolitan Museum of Art in New York City. This work was put on display in 2017 and was hung in Gallery 399, between the Modern and Contemporary Art wing and the Rockefeller Wing, where contemporary art borders Indigenous art.

== Selected exhibitions ==
Yahgulanaas has featured in the following exhibitions.

=== Solo exhibitions ===
- ‘’Blackened Frame’’, Madrona Gallery, Victoria, Canada 2026
- Diaries after a Flood, Museum of Contemporary Art, Toronto, Canada, 2024
- JAJ, Humboldt Forum, Berlin, Germany (permanent installation)
- Above the Flood, Bowen, BC. Canada 2026
- Daalkaatlii Diaires 9 works from a 26 piece series on exhibit at the Quai Branly de Jacques Chirac, Paris, France (permanent installation)
- Michael Nicoll Yahgulanaas – Traveling the Museum, Museum of Anthropology at UBC, Vancouver, BC, Canada, 2007
- Michael Nicoll Yahgulanaas, Glenbow Museum, Calgary, AB, Canada, 2009
- Michael Nicoll Yahgulanaas and Edward Burtynsky, Glenbow Museum, Calgary, AB, Canada, 2009
- Emily Carr and Michael Nicoll Yahgulanaas, Masters Gallery, Calgary, AB, Canada, 2013
- Old Growth, grunt gallery, Vancouver, BC, Canada, 2013
- The Seriousness of Play, Bill Reid Gallery of Northwest Coast Art, Vancouver, BC, Canada, 2016
- A Tale of Two Shamans, Haida Gwaii, Canada, 2018
- Making Mischief, Gallery Jones, Vancouver, Canada, 2021
- New Works, Madrona Gallery, Victoria, Canada, 2022

=== Group exhibitions ===
- Skung Gwaii Robe, Haida Gwaii Museum at Qay'llnagaay, Haida Gwaii, Canada, 2002
- Raven Travelling, Vancouver Art Gallery, Vancouver, BC, Canada, 2006
- What Use Art History?, Art Gallery of the South Okanagan, Penticton, BC, Canada, 2008
- Challenging Traditions, Reach Gallery Museum, Abbotsford, BC, Canada, 2010
- Visions of British Columbia: A Landscape Manual, Vancouver Art Gallery, Vancouver, BC, Canada, 2010
- Haida Made: New Collaborations in Design, Harbourfront Centre, Toronto, ON, Canada, 2010
- Continuum: Vision and Creativity on the Northwest Coast, Bill Reid Gallery of Northwest Coast Art, Vancouver, BC, Canada, 2010
- Beat Nation, Vancouver Art Gallery, Vancouver, BC, Canada, 2012
- Tokyo Design Week, Milan, Italy, 2015
- Sding ḴʼawX̱angs, McCord Stewart Museum, Montreal, Canada, 2019
- Comic Sans, Art Gallery of Alberta, Edmonton, AB, Canada, 2022
- Outsider Art Fair, Metropolitan Pavilion, New York City, USA, 2023
- Two Squares Equal One with Thomas Seligman at 35 Barlett, San Francisco, 2023
- New Terrains: Contemporary Native American Art, Phillips, New York City, USA
- D'un océan à l'autre, cap sur la bande dessinée canadienne / From Coast to Coast, Canadian Comics on the Move, Angoulême International Comics Festival, Angoulême, France, 2024
- XIÁM, Bill Reid Gallery of Northwest Coast Art, Vancouver, BC, Canada, 2024
- Peabody Essex Museum, Salem Mass. USA permanent exhibition
- British Museum London, permanent exhibit
- Humboldt Forum Berlin, permanent exhibit
- Denver Art Museum, permanent exhibit

== Published works ==
Yahgulanaas has written and illustrated the following books.

- JAJ: a Haida Manga, ISBN 9781771623537, (2023)
- Lost Haida Manga, a compendium, (2026)
- Carpe Fin: A Haida Manga, ISBN 9781771622240, (2019)
- War of the Blink, ISBN 9780995994621, (2017)
- Old Growth: Michael Nicoll Yahgulanaas, Liz Park (ed.), ISBN 978-1897476963, (2012)
- The Canoe He Called Loo Taas (illustrator), ISBN 978-0978255367, (2010)
- The Little Hummingbird, ISBN 9781553655336 (2010)
- The Declaration of Interdependence (illustrator), ISBN 978-1553655466 (2010)
- The Canoe He Called Loo Taas, ISBN 9780978255367, (2010)
- Red: A Haida Manga, ISBN 9781553653530, (2009)
- Flight of the Hummingbird: a parable for the environment, ISBN 978-1553653721, (2008)
- Hachidori (2005)
- A Lousy Tale (2004)
- The Last Voyage of the Black Ship, ISBN 978-1895123159, (2001)
- A Tale of Two Shamans, ISBN 978-1894778015, (2001)
- No Tankers, No T'anks (1977) – Volume 1 of the Tales of Raven series

Hachidori has sold over 100,000 copies in Japan, with a single-day record sale of 20,000 copies. Flight of the Hummingbird, first published in North America and now available in five languages, is also a bestseller and includes essays contributed by the Dalai Lama and Nobel Peace Prize winner Wangari Maathai. Declaration of Interdependence, written by David Suzuki, was illustrated by Yahgulanaas. Two Canadian Opera companies commissioned Yahgulanaas to write a libretto based on his book Flight of the Hummingbird. In celebration of the potency of diversity which is a critical element in Yahgulanaas oeuvre, powerful new music was created by Maxime Goulet.

JAJ: A Haida Manga was shortlisted for the Jim Deva Prize for Writing that Provokes in 2024.
