= Headhunter =

Headhunter or head hunter may refer to:

- Headhunting, hunting a human and collecting the severed head after killing them
- Executive search, informally called headhunting, a specialized recruitment service

== Arts and entertainment ==
=== Film and television ===
- Headhunter (film), a 2009 Danish thriller
- Headhunters (film), a 2011 Norwegian film
- Headhunters (TV series), a British TV drama miniseries from 1994
- Head Hunters (game show), a British TV show from 2019
- "Headhunters" (Gravity Falls), an episode of the animated TV series
- The Head Hunter (1982 film), a Hong Kong action film
- The Head Hunter (2018 film), an American fantasy horror film
- Headhunting (What We Do in the Shadows), an episode of the TV series What We Do in the Shadows

=== Literature ===
- Headhunter (novel), by Timothy Findley, 1993
- Headhunters (novel), by John Kinh, 1997
- Headhunter, a 1984 novel by Michael Slade
- Headhunter, a 2008 CSI novel by Greg Cox
- Headhunters, a 1997 Shadowrun novel by Mel Odom
- Headhunters, a 2001 novel by Jules Bass
- Headhunters (Norwegian: Hodejegerne), a 2008 novel by Jo Nesbø
- Headhunters, a 2015 novel by Mark Dawson
- The Headhunters, a 1936 pulp fiction novel by L. Ron Hubbard
- The Headhunters, a 2008 novel by Peter Lovesey

=== Music ===
- The Headhunters, a jazz fusion band founded by Herbie Hancock
  - Head Hunters, a 1973 album by Herbie Hancock
- Headhunter (album), by Krokus, 1983, and its title track "Headhunter"
- The Head Hunters, a 1969 album by Chico Hamilton, and the title track "Head Hunters"
- "Headhunter" (song), by Front 242, 1988
- "Head Hunter" (song), by Dance Gavin Dance, 2019
- "Headhunters", a song by 808 State from the 1988 album Newbuild

=== Other uses in arts and entertainment ===
- Headhunter (DC Comics), a fictional character
- Headhunter (video game), 2001
  - Headhunter Redemption, the 2003 sequel
- Z-95 Headhunter, a class of starfighter in Star Wars

== Businesses, organizations and groups ==
- Head Hunters Motorcycle Club, in New Zealand
- 80th Fighter Squadron, USAF, nicknamed Headhunters
- 9th Cavalry Regiment (United States), formerly known as Headhunters in Vietnam
- Headhunter Records, a record label

== People ==
- Jade Jones (taekwondo) (born 1993), British taekwondo fighter nicknamed "The Headhunter"
- Headhunter, three character wrestlers from the Gorgeous Ladies of Wrestling
- Headhunter, a former performing name of electronic music artist Addison Groove (Tony Williams, born 1942)
- Headhunterz (Willem Rebergen, born 1985), Dutch DJ and music producer

== Sports ==
- Headhunter (baseball), a baseball pitcher who aims at a player's head
- The Headhunters (professional wrestling), a professional wrestling tag team of Headhunter A and Headhunter B
- Chelsea Headhunters, a British football hooligan firm
- Mississippi Headhunters, formerly Columbus Wardogs, an American arena football team

== See also ==
- The Kentucky Headhunters, an American country rock band
- Headhunters of the Coral Sea, a 1940 book by Ion Idriess
