= William Malone Baskervill =

American academic (1850–1899)

- Born: 1850; Fayette County, Tennessee
- Died: 1899 (aged 48–49)
- Occupation: Academic

William Malone Baskervill (1850–1899) was a writer and professor of the English language and literature at Vanderbilt University.

== Early life ==
William Malone Baskerville was born in 1850 in Fayette County, Tennessee. He graduated from Randolph–Macon College in Ashland, Virginia. One of his teachers, Thomas Randoph Price, encouraged him to study in Germany. As a result, he attended the University of Leipzig in 1873–1874, where he became friends with Charles Forster Smith.

== Career ==
From 1876 to 1881, Baskervill taught at Wofford College alongside Smith and James H. Kirkland. In 1878-79 he returned to study in Leipzig, and in the summer of 1880, returned to Leipzig to finish his doctorate. Beginning in 1881, Baskervill taught at Vanderbilt University. Together with Smith, who also taught at Vanderbilt, and George Washington Cable, he ran an organization known as the Open Letter Club. Essie Samuels notes this was "a loosely organized attempt to disseminate liberal propaganda concerning civil rights and education for the Negro in the South between 1887 and 1890."

== Personal life ==
He was the son-in-law of Methodist Bishop and Vanderbilt University co-founder Holland Nimmons McTyeire.

== Death ==
He died in 1899.

== Bibliography ==
- An outline of Anglo-Saxon grammar (from the appendix of Harrison & Baskervill's Anglo-Saxon dictionary), in 1887
- An English Grammar with J. W. Sewell, in 1896
- Irwin Russell, in 1896
- Charles Egbert Craddock, in 1896
- Joel Chandler Harris, in 1896
- Maurice Thompson, in 1896
- Sidney Lanier, in 1896
- Anglo-Saxon Prose Reader Reader for Beginners with J. A. Harrison, in 1898
- The Elements of English Grammar with J. W. Sewell, in 1900
- A School Grammar of the English language (Baskervill-Sewell English course), in 1903
