= James Sprayberry =

James Michael Sprayberry
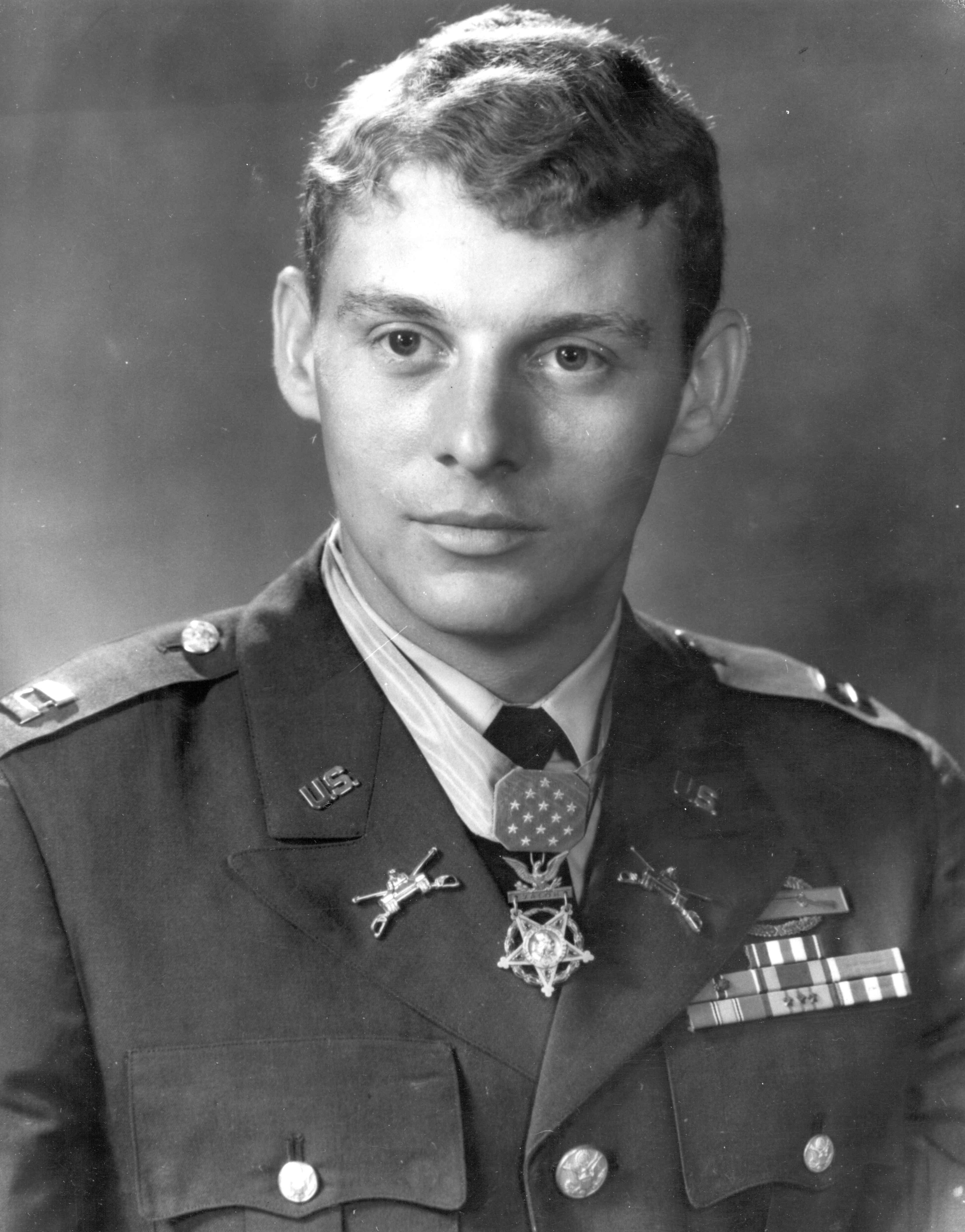
- Born: April 24, 1947 (age 79); LaGrange, Georgia
- Military career
- Allegiance: United States
- Branch: United States Army
- Service years: 1967–1988
- Rank: Lieutenant Colonel
- Nickname: "Mike"
- Unit: 7th Cavalry Regiment
- Conflicts: Vietnam War
- Awards: Medal of Honor; Silver Star; Bronze Star Medal (2); Purple Heart; Air Medal

James Michael Sprayberry (born April 24, 1947) is a former United States Army officer and a recipient of the United States military's highest decoration, the Medal of Honor, for his actions in the Vietnam War.

== Early life and military career ==
Born in LaGrange, Georgia, on April 24, 1947, Sprayberry grew up in Sylacauga, Alabama. He joined the Army from Montgomery in 1967, and by April 25, 1968 was serving as a first lieutenant in Company D, 5th Battalion, 7th Cavalry Regiment, 1st Cavalry Division (Airmobile). On that day, in the Republic of Vietnam, he led a patrol which rescued men who had been wounded and cut off from the rest of the company. In the course of the rescue mission, Sprayberry personally destroyed several enemy bunkers and machine gun emplacements. He was subsequently promoted to captain and awarded the Medal of Honor for his actions.

Sprayberry reached the rank of lieutenant colonel before retiring from the army in 1988.

== Personal life ==
As of 2000, Sprayberry lives in Titus, Elmore County, Alabama.

== Medal of Honor citation ==
Sprayberry's official Medal of Honor citation reads:

For conspicuous gallantry and intrepidity in action at the risk of his life above and beyond the call of duty. Capt. Sprayberry, Armor, U.S. Army, distinguished himself by exceptional bravery while serving as executive officer of Company D. His company commander and a great number of the men were wounded and separated from the main body of the company. A daylight attempt to rescue them was driven back by the well entrenched enemy's heavy fire. Capt. Sprayberry then organized and led a volunteer night patrol to eliminate the intervening enemy bunkers and to relieve the surrounded element. The patrol soon began receiving enemy machinegun fire. Capt. Sprayberry quickly moved the men to protective cover and without regard for his own safety, crawled within close range of the bunker from which the fire was coming. He silenced the machinegun with a hand grenade. Identifying several l-man enemy positions nearby, Capt. Sprayberry immediately attacked them with the rest of his grenades. He crawled back for more grenades and when 2 grenades were thrown at his men from a position to the front, Capt. Sprayberry, without hesitation, again exposed himself and charged the enemy-held bunker killing its occupants with a grenade. Placing 2 men to cover his advance, he crawled forward and neutralized 3 more bunkers with grenades. Immediately thereafter, Capt. Sprayberry was surprised by an enemy soldier who charged from a concealed position. He killed the soldier with his pistol and with continuing disregard for the danger neutralized another enemy emplacement. Capt. Sprayberry then established radio contact with the isolated men, directing them toward his position. When the 2 elements made contact he organized his men into litter parties to evacuate the wounded. As the evacuation was nearing completion, he observed an enemy machinegun position which he silenced with a grenade. Capt. Sprayberry returned to the rescue party, established security, and moved to friendly lines with the wounded. This rescue operation, which lasted approximately 7½ hours, saved the lives of many of his fellow soldiers. Capt. Sprayberry personally killed 12 enemy soldiers, eliminated 2 machineguns, and destroyed numerous enemy bunkers. Capt. Sprayberry's indomitable spirit and gallant action at great personal risk to his life are in keeping with the highest traditions of the military service and reflect great credit upon himself, his unit, and the U.S. Army.

== See also ==
- List of Medal of Honor recipients for the Vietnam War
