= Sewel =

Sewel may refer to:

- John Sewel, Baron Sewel, member of the British House of Lords
- Legislative Consent Motion (called a Sewel Motion in relation to Scotland), a procedure whereby a devolved parliament in the United Kingdom gives the central government permission to legislate on a devolved matter

== See also ==
- Sewell (disambiguation)
- Sewall
- MV Sewol and sinking of MV Sewol
