= Sewall =

Sewall is a surname. Notable people with the surname include:

- Arthur Sewall (1835–1900), American shipbuilder and politician
- Charles S. Sewall (1779–1848), American politician
- David Sewall (1735–1825), American judge
- Doug Sewall (fl. 2000s), American wheelchair curler
- George P. Sewall (1811–1881), American lawyer and State Representative from Old Town, Maine
- Gilbert T. Sewall (born 1946), American educator and author
- Harold M. Sewall (1860–1924), American politician and diplomat
- Harriet Winslow Sewall (1819–1889), American poet
- Jonathan Sewall (1729–1796), last British attorney general of Massachusetts
- Joseph Sewall (1921–2011), American businessman and politician from Maine
- May Wright Sewall (1844–1920), American feminist, educator, and lecturer
- Richard B. Sewall (1908–2003), American professor of English at Yale University
- Samuel Sewall (1652–1730), American judge in Massachusetts
- Samuel Sewall (congressman) (1757–1814), American lawyer and congressman
- Samuel Edmund Sewall (1799-1888), American lawyer, abolitionist, and suffragist
- Sarah Sewall (born 1961), American lecturer at Harvard Kennedy School
- Stephen Sewall (orientalist) (1734–1804), American professor at Harvard University
- Sumner Sewall (1897–1965), Governor of Maine and airline executive
- Thomas Sewall (1786–1845), American physician

== See also ==
- Sewall, British Columbia
- Sewall's Point, Florida
- Sewell (disambiguation)
- Sewel (disambiguation)
