= Attorney General Seawell =

Attorney General Seawell may refer to:

- Aaron A. F. Seawell (1864–1950), Attorney General of North Carolina
- Henry Seawell, Attorney General of North Carolina
- Malcolm Buie Seawell (1909–1977), Attorney General of North Carolina

== See also ==
- Attorney General Sewell (disambiguation)
