= Titus, Alabama =

Unincorporated community in Alabama, United States

- Unincorporated community
- Location within Alabama Location within the United States
- Coordinates: 32°42′44″N 86°19′06″W
- Country: United States
- State: Alabama
- County: Elmore
- Elevation: 466 ft (142 m)
- Time zone: UTC-6 (Central (CST))
  - Summer (DST): UTC-5 (CDT)
- ZIP code: 36080
- Area code: 334
- GNIS feature ID: 128000

Titus is an unincorporated community in Elmore County, Alabama, United States. Titus is 13.2 miles (21.2 km) north-northwest of Wetumpka as of 2025. Titus has a post office with ZIP code 36080. Much of the community borders Jordan Lake.

== Demographics ==
As of the 2020 census, Titus had a population of 4,970 people and 1,743 households. Of the town's population, 4,524 identified as white alone, 420 as Black or African American, 81 as Hispanic or Latino, 12 as Asian, 11 as Native American and Alaskan Native, and 1 as native Hawaiian or other Pacific Islander. 235 people identified as two or more races, and 37 as some other race.

The median age in Titus was 48.6 years. 18.3% of the population were under 18 years old, 65.7% were between ages 18-65, and 16% were 65 years or older.

The median income was $83,906. This was higher than the median income for Elmore County as a whole, which was $71,651.

The educational distribution indicates that 34.1% achieved a high school or equivalent diploma or higher , 22.2% completed some college, but did not obtain a degree, 5.5% obtained an associate's degree, 17.5% obtained a bachelor's degree, and 4.9% obtained a graduate or other professional degree.

== Notable people ==
- Joe Sewell - Hall of Fame shortstop with the Cleveland Indians and the New York Yankees
- Luke Sewell - Professional baseball player, coach, and manager with multiple teams
- Tommy Sewell - Professional baseball player who played in one game for the Chicago Cubs
- James M. Sprayberry, recipient of the Medal of Honor during the Vietnam War
