= George Sewell (disambiguation) =

George Sewell (1924–2007) was an English actor.

George Sewell may also refer to:

- George Sewell (physician) (died 1726), English physician and writer
- George Sewell (politician) (1855–1916), Australian politician
- George Alexander Sewell (1910–1983), American minister and college professor
- George David Sewell (d. 1938) Canadian politician
- George Samuel Sewell (1897–1969), British engineer and George Medal recipient

== Characters ==
- George Sewell (Silent Hill), a character from the Japanese horror media franchise Silent Hill
- Georgie Sewell, a character in the English TV series Peaky Blinders
