= Thomas Sewell =

Thomas Sewell may refer to:

- Tom Sewell (basketball) (born 1962), American shooting guard
- Tom Sewell (cricketer, born 1806) (1806–1888), English cricketer
- Tom Sewell (cricketer, born 1830) (1830–1871), English cricketer, son of Tom Sewell senior (above)
- Tommy Sewell (1906–1956), baseball player
- Thomas Sewell (neo-Nazi) (born 1993), Australian neo-Nazi
- Thomas Sewell (judge) (c. 1710–1784), an English judge and MP.

== See also ==
- Thomas Sowell, American economist of the Chicago School
