= Stephen Sewall (disambiguation) =

Stephen Sewall (1702–1760), was a judge in colonial Massachusetts.

Stephen Sewall may also refer to:

- Stephen Sewall (orientalist) (1734–1804), American professor

== See also ==
- Stephen Sewell (disambiguation)
