= Arthur Sewell =

Arthur Sewell is the name of:

- Arthur Sewell (athlete) (1903–1984), British athlete
- Arthur Sewell (footballer) (1934–2022), English footballer

== See also ==
- Arthur Sewall (1835–1900), American shipbuilder
