= James Sewell =

James Sewell may refer to:

- James Edwards Sewell (1810–1903), warden of New College, Oxford
- James Sewell, choreographer and founder of the James Sewell Ballet
- James Witt Sewell (1865–1955), writer and philosopher

== See also ==
- James Sewall (1778–1842), commander in the War of 1812
