= Haida manga =

Contemporary style of comics and cartoons

Haida manga is a contemporary style of Haida comics and print cartoons that explores the elements of both traditional North Pacific indigenous arts and narrative, while also adapting contemporary techniques of artistic design from the western portion of the North Pacific. Haida manga have been published in several countries and regions, including Japan, South Korea, China, Taiwan, Macao, France, and Canada.

== History and style ==
Haida manga has been recently popularized by artist Michael Nicoll Yahgulanaas who is considered the father of Haida manga, making its debut in 2001 in his book, A Tale of Two Shamans which led to a series of exhibits (such as at Expo 2005 and Tokyo Designers Week 2003) and multiple print runs in Japan and Korea. Asian interest in the graphic appeal of Haida design is enhanced by the narratives which advocate a hopeful and empowering message. Michael Nicoll Yahgulanaas expresses his own interest in Haida manga in that it is "not part of the settler tradition of North America (like Archie or Marvel Comics, for example)".

Michael Nicoll Yahgulanaas: Haida Manga Works
Work Title	Year released
"Red"	2014
"Flight of the Hummingbird: A Parable for the Environment"	2008
"Stolen but Recovered"	2007
"Pedal to the Meddle"	2007
"Two Sisters"	2007
"A Tale of Two Shamans"	2001

Haida manga may also appear as ink or watercolor on paper, and has also shown up on reassembled automobile parts and disassembled bone trays displayed in the University of British Columbia Museum of Anthropology and the Glenbow Museum in Calgary. A more recent ink on paper version appeared as a book called Flight of the Hummingbird - A Parable for the Environment. It was released in 2008 and soon became available in five languages including English, French, Spanish, Japanese, and Korean. It was also featured in an animated version on YouTube, narrated by Lark Clark and animated by Chris Auchter.

While Michael Nicoll Yahgulanaas remains the main author of Haida manga, the popularization of his works and efforts over the years have sparked interest in general Haida narrative and art form, leading to other works such as Raven Steals the Light, an animation telling the traditional Haida legend of the creation of the sun, the moon, and the stars, created by Thomas Oz and narrated by Kristin Bell.

== See also ==
- Haida mythology
- Original English-language manga
- Manfra
