= Allan Leonard Lewis =

Recipient of the Victoria Cross

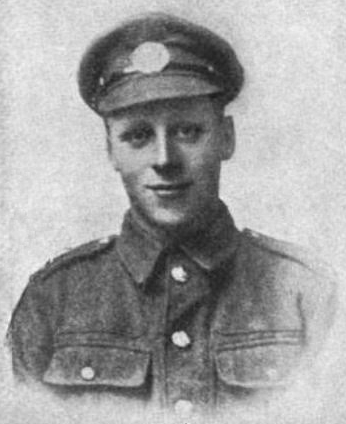
- Born: 28 February 1895; Whitney-on-Wye, Herefordshire, England
- Died: 21 September 1918 (aged 23); Rossnoy, near Lempire, France
- Military career
- Allegiance: United Kingdom
- Branch: British Army
- Rank: Lance Corporal
- Units: The Northamptonshire Regiment
- Conflicts: World War I
- Awards: Victoria Cross

Allan Leonard Lewis VC (28 February 1895 – 21 September 1918) was an English recipient of the Victoria Cross, the highest and most prestigious award for gallantry in the face of the enemy that can be awarded to British and Commonwealth forces.

== Details ==
Lewis was born in Herefordshire, but moved to South Wales to find work. On the outbreak of the First World War he was employed by the Great Western Railway as a bus driver at Neath. he joined up in March 1915. The GWR has no record of Lewis on its Rolls of Honour or War memorials, and it may be that he joined up without the company's agreement, and thus lost his post and pension rights. By September 1918 he was 23 years old, and a lance-corporal in the 6th Battalion, The Northamptonshire Regiment, British Army during the same war when the following deed took place for which he was awarded the Victoria Cross.

On 18 September 1918 at Rossnoy, near Lempire, France, Lance-Corporal Lewis was in command of a section on the right of the attacking line, held up by intense machine-gun fire. He saw that two guns were enfilading the line and crawled forward alone, successfully bombed the guns and by rifle fire made the whole team surrender. On 21 September he rushed his company through the enemy barrage, but was killed while getting his men under cover from heavy machine-gun fire.

== Further information ==
Lance-Corporal Lewis is remembered on the Vis-en-Artois memorial near Vis-en-Artois British Cemetery, Haucourt as he has no known grave. The medal was handed to Lance-Corporal's Lewis's elder brother Frank by their mother. She made him promise that the medal would never be sold as she said that she lost a son, and she considered any profit from it would be blood money. Frank kept the medal in his home until his death. It was then agreed by the children of Frank that as he still had a brother, alive, he could hold the medal for his remaining days and then it was to be placed in a museum, either the regimental or local Hereford. When this brother died, the medal was assumed to be part of his estate and was kept by sole beneficiary of the will. Despite requests from Frank's close family, the medal was not returned and therefore not put into a museum.

On the centenary of Lewis' sacrifice a number of events took place to honour him.

On 18 September 2018 two plaques honouring Allan Lewis (one in English and one in Welsh) were unveiled at Neath Station, by his great niece, Dawn Lewis. The Railway Heritage Trust funded these plaques.

On 21 September 2018, the exact centenary of his death, a bronze statue of Lewis was unveiled in Hereford's Old Market Shopping Centre. The statue was designed by Jemma Pearson, and was unveiled by Her Majesty's Lord Lieutenant of Herefordshire, The Dowager Countess of Darnley. The statue was funded by the A L Lewis VC Memorial Fund, the chair of which is Dawn Lewis. In addition to the statue, a memorial plaque was dedicated to Allan in the Lady Arbour at Hereford Cathedral.

At about the same time the modern Great Western Railway named one of its new InterCity bi-mode trains after Allan Lewis, recognizing him despite the predecessor company having not done so.

== Bibliography ==
- Gliddon, Gerald (2014) [2002]. Road to Victory 1918. VCs of the First World War. The History Press. ISBN 978-0750953610.
