= Sowell =

Sowell is a surname. It may refer to:

- Anthony Sowell (1959–2021), American serial killer
- Arnie Sowell (born 1935), American middle distance runner
- Bobby Sowell (born 1947), American musician
- Chase Sowell (born 2004), American football player
- Dawn Sowell (born 1966), American sprinter
- Jerald Sowell (born 1974), American football player
- Mike Sowell, American sports historian and professor of journalism
- Shaunna Sowell, American engineer
- Thomas Sowell (born 1930), American economist, political commentator, and author

== See also ==
- Sewell
