= Swelling =

Swelling may refer to:

- Edema, a transient abnormal enlargement of a body part or area not caused by a tumor
- Die swell, the increase in cross-sectional area of a polymer after it exits an extrusion die
- Swelling capacity, the amount of liquid that can be absorbed by a polymer
- Neutron-induced swelling, the increasing of volume and decreasing of density of materials subjected to intense neutron radiation
- Swelling index

== See also ==
- Shrinkage (disambiguation)
- Swell (disambiguation)
