= Sewall, British Columbia =

Community in British Columbia, Canada

Sewall
- Location of Sewall in British Columbia
- Coordinates: 53°45′55″N 132°18′00″W
- Country: Canada
- Province: British Columbia

Sewall, sometimes incorrectly spelled Sewell, is an unincorporated locality located on the north shore of Masset Inlet, on Graham Island in the Haida Gwaii archipelago (formerly known as Queen Charlotte Islands) off the North Coast of British Columbia, Canada. It is located 33 kilometres (21 miles) up Masset Inlet.

== History ==
Sewall began its life as a real estate promotion dubbed Star City, after the developer, the Star Realty Company, during a real estate boom on Graham Island that also saw the foundations of Juskatla, Delkatla and Graham Centre, but the name Sewall was finally chosen, being that of S.D. Sewall (the "Sewell" spelling is featured in the provincial gazette of 1930, but was a mistaken association with Sewell Inlet nearby, which has a different name-origin.) By the end of 1913, seventy families had settled here, mostly Icelandic Canadians encouraged to relocate from Manitoba. After the First World War, most families moved away, but one of the original homesteaders, Paul Bastian, bought up most of the land and continued to live on and raise his family there. S.D. Sewall said that he was interested in farmland in the area surrounding Sewall, and that it was not the intention of the developers "to force the new town's growth but to build up the area around it".

Sewall had been the site of a sawmill owned by the Masset Inlet Lumber Company.

== Climate ==
Climate data for Sewall
| Month | Jan | Feb | Mar | Apr | May | Jun | Jul | Aug | Sep | Oct | Nov | Dec | Year |
|---|---|---|---|---|---|---|---|---|---|---|---|---|---|
| Record high °C (°F) | 11.7 (53.1) | 14 (57) | 15.6 (60.1) | 23.6 (74.5) | 26.5 (79.7) | 28.5 (83.3) | 30 (86) | 32.2 (90.0) | 27.8 (82.0) | 18 (64) | 14.5 (58.1) | 11.5 (52.7) | 32.2 (90.0) |
| Mean daily maximum °C (°F) | 5.4 (41.7) | 6.2 (43.2) | 7.9 (46.2) | 10.4 (50.7) | 13 (55) | 16.2 (61.2) | 18.2 (64.8) | 19 (66) | 16.5 (61.7) | 12 (54) | 7.8 (46.0) | 5.4 (41.7) | 11.5 (52.7) |
| Mean daily minimum °C (°F) | 0.8 (33.4) | 0.7 (33.3) | 1.3 (34.3) | 2.6 (36.7) | 5.1 (41.2) | 8.2 (46.8) | 10.6 (51.1) | 10.9 (51.6) | 8.8 (47.8) | 5.7 (42.3) | 2.1 (35.8) | 0.9 (33.6) | 4.8 (40.6) |
| Record low °C (°F) | −12.2 (10.0) | −14 (7) | −10.6 (12.9) | −3 (27) | −1.1 (30.0) | 1 (34) | 4.5 (40.1) | 4.5 (40.1) | 1 (34) | −7 (19) | −17 (1) | −13.3 (8.1) | −17 (1) |
| Average precipitation mm (inches) | 157.3 (6.19) | 127.3 (5.01) | 110.8 (4.36) | 98.9 (3.89) | 83.8 (3.30) | 69.6 (2.74) | 61.4 (2.42) | 79.2 (3.12) | 119.1 (4.69) | 224.5 (8.84) | 203.8 (8.02) | 172.9 (6.81) | 1,508.4 (59.39) |
Source: Environment Canada

== See also ==
- List of communities in British Columbia
- Sewall (disambiguation)
