= James Witt Sewell =

James Witt Sewell (1865–1955) was a writer and teacher of the English language at the Hume-Fogg High School in Nashville, Tennessee.

== Bibliography ==
- An English Grammar with W. M. Baskervill, in 1896
- Elements of English Grammar with W. M. Baskervill, in 1900
- A School Grammar of the English Language with W. M. Baskervill, in 1903
- Language lessons (Baskervill-Sewell English course), in 1903
- A School Grammar of the English language. Rev. ed (Baskervill-Sewell English course), in 1909
- Practical English for seventh and eighth grades, in 1911
- Makers of America, in 1930
- Team work, in 1930
