= General Sewell =

General Sewell may refer to:

- Horace Sewell (1881–1953), British Army brigadier general
- Timothy Toyne Sewell (born 1941), British Army major general
- William Henry Sewell (c. 1786–1862), British Army general

== See also ==
- Attorney General Sewell (disambiguation)
