= Robert Sewell =

Robert Sewell may refer to:

- Robert Sewell (historian) (1845–1925), worked in the civil service of the Madras Presidency
- Robert Sewell (lawyer) (1751–1828), Attorney General of Jamaica and member of the Parliament of Great Britain
- Robert Sewell (cricketer) (1866–1901), English cricketer
