= Barton Sewell II =

American industrialist (1905–1953)

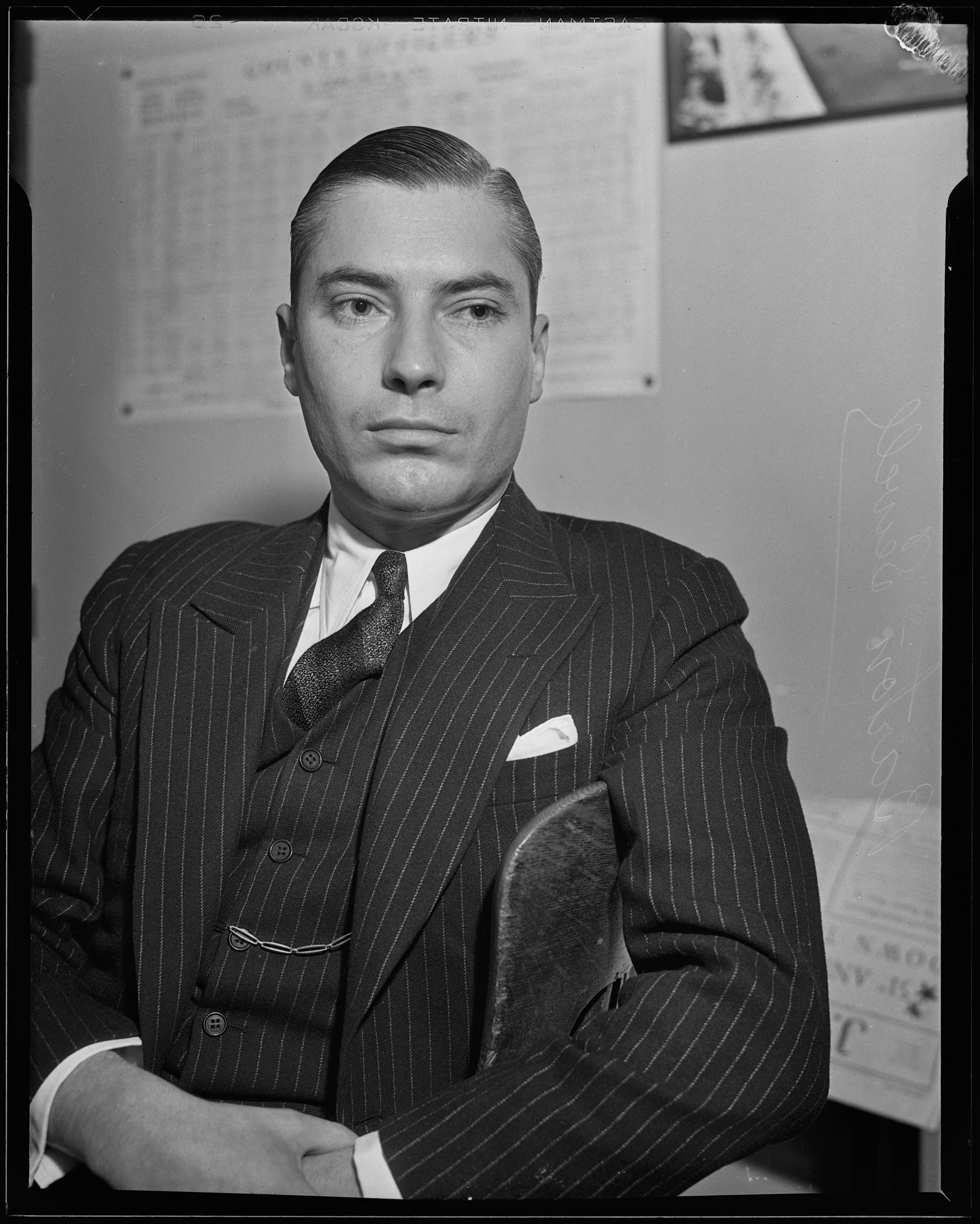
Barton Sewell II

Barton Sewell II (August 28, 1905 – January 6, 1953) was an heir to an American mining fortune; he was named for his grandfather Barton Sewell. Sewell and his wife were involved in a highly publicized divorce in the 1930s. Buster Keaton allegedly had an affair with Sewell's wife. Sewell died of an apparent overdose of sleeping pills in Los Angeles County, California in 1953.
