= Elizabeth Anesta Sewell =

Elizabeth Anesta Sewell (1872 – 1959) was a Welsh-born writer under the pen-name Diana Lewes. Her memoir, A Year in Jamaica: Memoirs of a girl in Arcadia in 1889, was published posthumously in 2013 by Eland. The memoir, a coming-of-age story set on a Jamaican sugar plantation called Arcadia, has received praise for its portrait of colonial Jamaica.
