= William Sewell =

William Sewell may refer to:

- William H. Sewell (1909–2001), United States sociologist
- William H. Sewell Jr. (born 1940), American academic
- William J. Sewell (1835–1901), Union Army officer and Senator from New Jersey
- William Sewell (author) (1804–1874), English divine and author
- William Sewell (cricketer) (died 1862), English cricketer
- William Sewell (poet) (1951–2003), New Zealand poet
- William Sewell (trade unionist) (1852–1948), British trade unionist
- William Sewell (veterinary surgeon) (1781–1853), principal of the London Veterinary College
- William Arthur Sewell (1903–1972), university professor of English
- William Elbridge Sewell (1851–1904), United States Navy officer
- William Henry Sewell (died 1862), British Army officer

== See also ==
- Bill Sewell (disambiguation)
