= Barton Sewell =

American industrialist (c. 1848 – 1915)

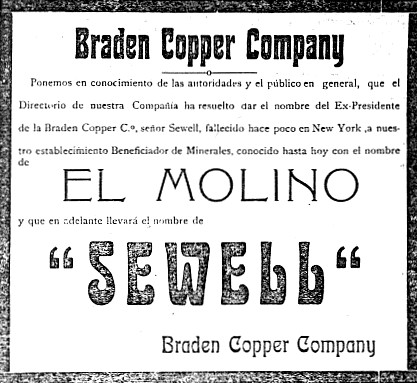
Sewell, Chile is named in his honor

Barton Sewell (c. 1848 – 1915) was an American industrialist, with investments in mining and smelting throughout the Americas. Sewell was instrumental in the funding of the El Teniente copper mine in Chile. Sewell, Chile was named in his honor shortly after his death.

He also served in the American Civil War, enlisting in 1862 as a drummer boy and serving near the Mississippi River. Lake Sewell, the lake created by the original Canyon Ferry Dam, was named in his honor.

== See also ==
- Barton Sewell II
