= Stephen Sewell =

Stephen Sewell may refer to:

- Stephen Sewell (lawyer) (1770–1832), early Canadian lawyer and politician
- Stephen Sewell (writer) (born 1953), Australian screen and play writer

== See also ==
- Stephen Sewall (disambiguation)
- Steve Sewell (born 1963), former American football player
