= Downsizing =

Downsizing, Downsize or Downsized may refer to:

- Downsizing an image in digital graphics, see Image scaling;
- Downsize (automobile), reduce size of a motor vehicle
- Downsizing (film), a 2017 science fiction comedy film by Alexander Payne
- Downsizing (property), moving to a smaller property
- Engine downsizing, trend in the combustion engines construction
- Layoff, temporary suspension or permanent termination of the employment of employees.
- Degrowth is sometimes called downsizing in macroeconomics
- "Downsize" (The Office), a 2001 television episode
- "Downsized", a song by Moloko from the album I Am Not a Doctor
