= Arthur Sewell (footballer) =

English footballer (1934–2022)

Personal information
- Full name: Arthur Sewell
- Date of birth: 15 July 1934
- Place of birth: West Cornforth, England
- Date of death: August 2022 (aged 88)
- Place of death: Surrey, England
- Position: Inside left

Senior career*
Years	Team	Apps	(Gls)
- Bishop Auckland
1954–1955	Bradford City	1	(0)
Total		1	(0)
- * Club domestic league appearances and goals

Arthur Sewell (15 July 1934 – August 2022) was an English professional footballer who played as an inside left.

== Career ==
Born in West Cornforth, Sewell moved from Bishop Auckland to Bradford City in April 1954. He made 1 league appearance for the club, before being released in 1955.

== Death ==
Sewell died in Surrey in August 2022, at the age of 88.

== Sources ==
- Frost, Terry (1988). Bradford City A Complete Record 1903-1988. Breedon Books Sport. ISBN 0-907969-38-0.
