= Swell (exhibit) =

Swell was a survey of art inspired by surf and beach culture, curated by Tim Nye and Jacqueline Miro. The exhibition opened to the public on July 1, 2010 at three locations in Chelsea, Manhattan, and included work by many members of the group of Venice Beach artists known as Light and Space and Finish Fetish.

The show focuses on beach culture and its influence on the Beat Generation, Assemblage, Light and Space, Finish Fetish, and early Pop Art.

One of the themes of the show is the relationship between Shapers and the Finish Fetish movement of the 60′s. The show focuses on two cities, L.A. and New York, and attempts to place the Ocean and its proximity to both cities as an antidote to a cacophony of quantities, speed and competing images. It also addresses how later generations of artists have looked back at assemblage, ephemera and graffiti as a way to either incorporate or reject the presence of branding, advertisement, and information technology.

== Locations ==
- nyehaus
- Metro Pictures
- Friedrich Petzel Gallery

== Artists ==
- Billy Al Bengston
- Charles Arnoldi
- Jay Batlle
- Larry Bell
- Wallace Berman
- Ashley Bickerton
- Sandow Birk
- Olaf Breuning
- Thomas Campbell
- Vija Celmins
- Bruce Conner
- Ron Cooper
- Jim Evans
- Joe Goode
- Gary Hill
- Dennis Hopper
- Craig Kauffman
- Ed Kienholz
- Robert Longo
- Sister Mary Corita
- John McCracken
- Ed Moses
- Catherine Opie
- Ken Price
- Ed Ruscha
- Dirk Skreber
- Craig Stecyk
- Fred Tomaselli
- DeWain Valentine
- John Van Hamersveld
- Timothy Williams
- Chris Gentile
- Susanne Melanie Berry
