= Frederick Sewell =

English cricketer

Personal information
- Full name: Frederick Alexander Seymour Sewell
- Born: 6 October 1881; Leamington Spa, Warwickshire, England
- Died: 5 June 1964 (aged 82); Parkstone, Dorset, England
- Batting: Right-handed
- Bowling: Right-arm slow

Domestic team information
- Years: Team
- 1921–1922: Bedfordshire
- 1902–1913: Dorset
- 1901–1902: Cambridge University

Career statistics
Competition	First-class
Matches	5
Runs scored	69
Batting average	11.50
100s/50s	–/–
Top score	19*
Balls bowled	372
Wickets	6
Bowling average	35.50
5 wickets in innings	–
10 wickets in match	–
Best bowling	3/71
Catches/stumpings	4/–
- Source: Cricinfo, 21 November 2011

Frederick Alexander Seymour Sewell (6 October 1881 – 5 June 1964) was an English cricketer. Sewell was a right-handed batsman who bowled right-arm slow. He was born at Leamington Spa, Warwickshire.

While studying at St Catharine's College, Cambridge, Sewell made his first-class debut for Cambridge University against AJ Webbe's XI in 1901. He made four further first-class appearances for the university, the last of which came against Surrey in 1902. In his five first-class appearances, he scored 69 runs at an average of 11.50, with a high score of 19 not out. With the ball, he took 6 wickets at a bowling average of 35.50, with best figures of 3/71. He was however not awarded a Cambridge Blue.

In 1902, Sewell made his debut for Dorset in the Minor Counties Championship against Wiltshire. He played for Dorset from 1902 to 1913, making 63 Minor Counties Championship appearances. He later played for Bedfordshire in the Minor Counties Championship in 1921 and 1922, making eight appearances.

He died at Parkstone, Dorset on 5 June 1964.
