= Attorney General Sewell =

Attorney General Sewell may refer to:

- Henry Sewell (1807–1879), Attorney-General of New Zealand
- Jonathan Sewell (1766–1839), Attorney-General of Lower Canada
- Robert Sewell (lawyer) (1751–1828), Attorney General of Jamaica

== See also ==
- Attorney General Seawell (disambiguation)
- General Sewell (disambiguation)
