= Joe Sewell =

American baseball player (1898–1990)

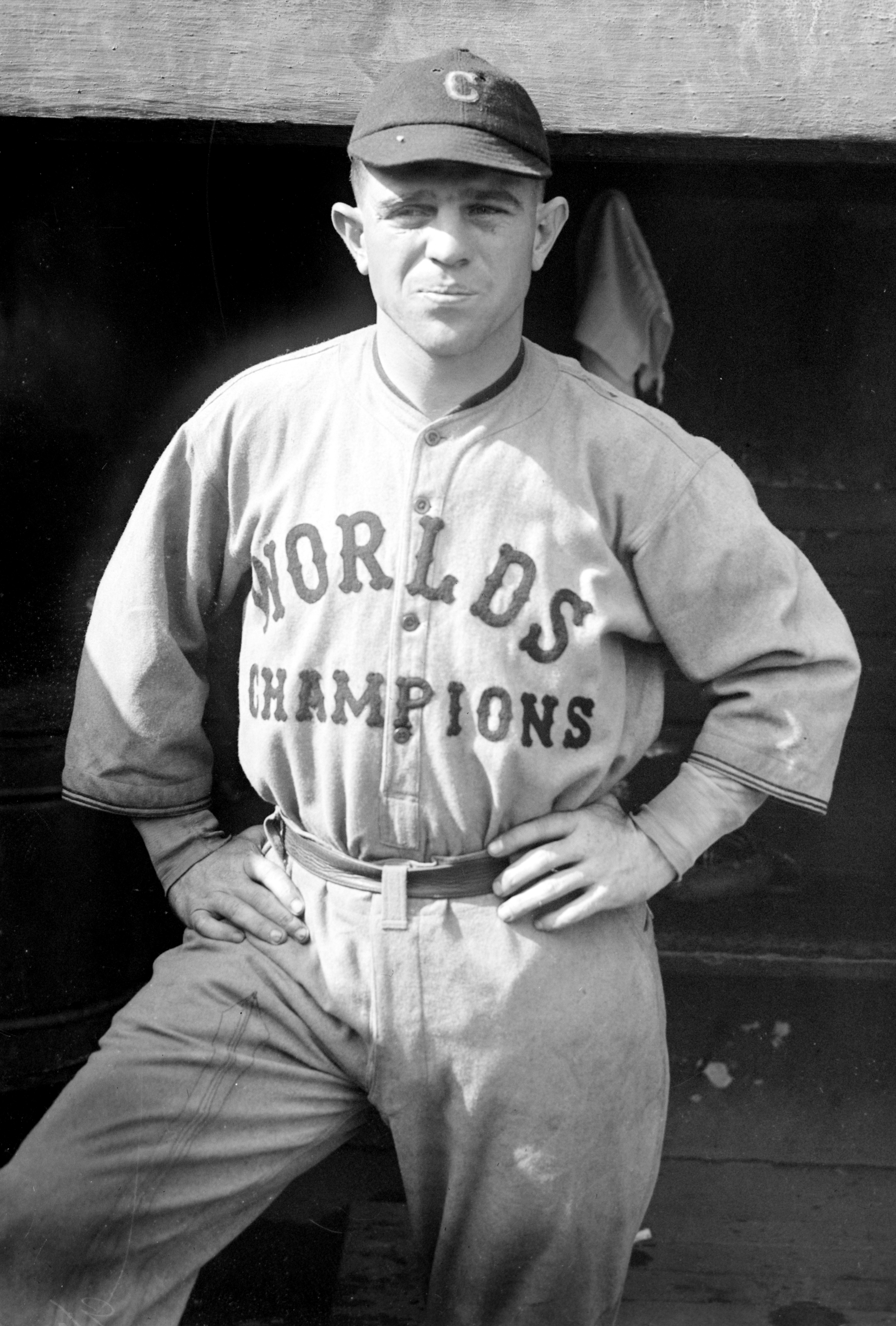
- Sewell, c. 1921
- Shortstop / Third baseman
- Born: October 9, 1898; Titus, Alabama, U.S.
- Died: March 6, 1990 (aged 91); Mobile, Alabama, U.S.
- Batted: Left Threw: Right

MLB debut
- September 10, 1920, for the Cleveland Indians

Last MLB appearance
- September 24, 1933, for the New York Yankees

MLB statistics
- Batting average: .312
- Hits: 2,226
- Home runs: 49
- Runs batted in: 1,054
- Stats at Baseball Reference

Teams
- Cleveland Indians (1920–1930); New York Yankees (1931–1933)

Career highlights and awards
- 2× World Series champion (1920, 1932); Cleveland Guardians Hall of Fame

Member of the National

Baseball Hall of Fame
- Induction: 1977
- Election method: Veterans Committee

Joseph Wheeler Sewell (October 9, 1898 – March 6, 1990) was an American professional baseball infielder who played in Major League Baseball for the Cleveland Indians and New York Yankees from 1920 to 1933. He was elected to the Baseball Hall of Fame in 1977.

Sewell was a member of two World Series-winning teams. He holds the record for the lowest career strikeout rate in major league history, striking out on average only once every 73 plate appearances, and the most consecutive games without a strikeout, at 115.

== Early life ==
Joseph Wheeler Sewell was born on October 9, 1898, in Titus, Alabama.

Sewell attended Wetumpka High School in Wetumpka, Alabama. He lettered in college football at the University of Alabama in 1917, 1918, and 1919. He led the school baseball team to four conference titles.

== Professional career ==
=== Minor leagues ===
Sewell joined the minor league New Orleans Pelicans in 1920, where he played a partial season before being called up to the "big league".

=== Cleveland Indians (1920–1930) ===
Sewell made his Major League debut mid-season in 1920 with the World Series champion Cleveland Indians shortly after shortstop Ray Chapman was killed by a pitch from the Yankees’ Carl Mays in August and became the team's full-time shortstop the following year. An emerging star, Sewell batted .318 with 101 runs, 93 RBIs and a .412 on-base percentage in 1921.

Sewell's patience and daily work ethic became his hallmarks over the following decade and a half. Playing with Cleveland until 1930 and the New York Yankees from 1931 to 1933, Sewell batted .312 with 1,141 runs, 1,054 RBI, 436 doubles, 68 triples, 49 home runs, 842 bases on balls and a .391 on-base percentage. He regularly scored 90 or more runs a season and twice topped the 100 RBI plateau in 1923 and '24. He hit a career-high 11 home runs in 1932.

Sewell struck out 114 times in 7,132 career at-bats for an average of one strikeout every 62.5 at-bats, second only to Willie Keeler (63.1). He also holds the modern single-season record for fewest strikeouts over a full season, with 3, set in 1932. Sewell also had 3 strikeouts in 1930, albeit in just 353 at-bats (as opposed to 503 in his record-setting year), as well as three other full seasons (1925, 1929, 1933) with 4 strikeouts. He struck out ten or more times in only four seasons, and his highest strikeout total was 20, during the 1922 season. For his 1925–1933 seasons, Sewell struck out 4, 6, 7, 9, 4, 3, 8, 3, and 4 times. He also holds the record for consecutive games without recording a strikeout, at 115.

Sewell also played in 1,103 consecutive games, which to that point was second only to Everett Scott.

=== New York Yankees (1931–1933) ===
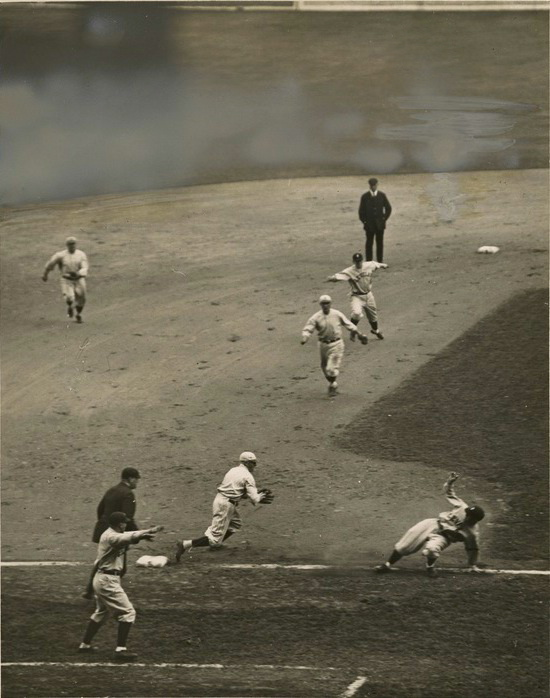
Sewell (bottom right) getting caught in a rundown in the 1920 World Series.

His 167.7 at-bats per strikeout in 1932 is still a single-season record.

According to his obituary published in The New York Times, he played his entire Major League career using only one bat (a 40-ouncer he dubbed "Black Betsy."), which he kept in shape by rubbing with a Coke bottle and seasoning with chewing tobacco.

Sewell played in two World Series, in 1920 and 1932, winning both times. His 1977 induction into the Baseball Hall of Fame was by the Veterans Committee. In 1981, Lawrence Ritter and Donald Honig included him in their book The 100 Greatest Baseball Players of All Time. (He joined the Indians' roster after September 1, 1920, and normally would not have been eligible to participate in post-season play, but Wilbert Robinson, manager of the Brooklyn Robins, waived the rule because of the circumstances with Chapman.)

== Personal life ==
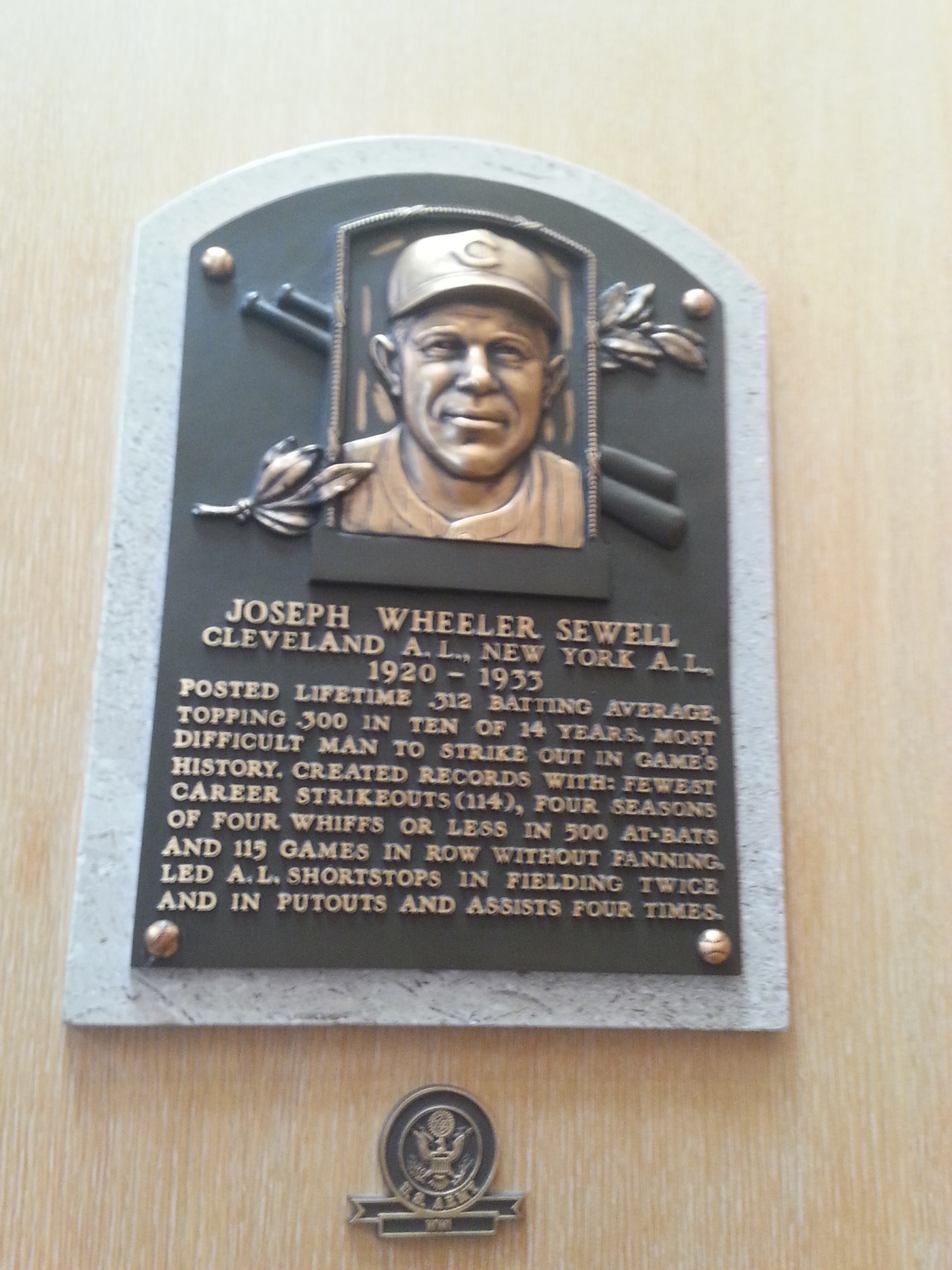
Plaque of Joe Sewell at the Baseball Hall of Fame

Two of his brothers, Luke and Tommy, also played major league baseball. Tommy played in one game with the Chicago Cubs in 1927, and Luke played for four teams over 20 years and, as manager of the St. Louis Browns, led the team to its only pennant in 1944. His cousin Rip Sewell was a major league pitcher credited with inventing the eephus pitch.

Joe Sewell was a member of Pi Kappa Phi fraternity. Sewell-Thomas Stadium, the baseball stadium at the University of Alabama, is named in his honor and is nicknamed by Crimson Tide fans as "The Joe". After his retirement, Sewell worked as a public relations man for a dairy and was a major league scout.

In 1964, at the age of 66, he became the Alabama baseball coach, achieving a 114–99 record in seven seasons. Sewell and his late Yankees teammate Ivy Andrews were both inducted into the Alabama Sports Hall of Fame in 1985.

One of his pitchers was future NFL standout, Alabama quarterback and 1966 MLB 10th round draftee (Yankees) Ken "The Snake" Stabler.

== Death ==
Sewell died on March 6, 1990, at the home of his son, Dr. James Sewell in Mobile, Alabama, at the age of 91. He was the last surviving member of the 1920 World Champion Cleveland Indians.

Posthumously, Sewell's community (Elmore County) has established a scholarship award recognizing local high school seniors who exhibit Christian character, leadership in their community, strong academic standing, and athletic achievements. Sewell graduated from Wetumpka High School in 1916.

== See also ==
- List of Major League Baseball individual streaks
- Major League Baseball consecutive games played streaks
- List of Major League Baseball career hits leaders
- List of Major League Baseball career doubles leaders
- List of Major League Baseball career runs scored leaders
- List of Major League Baseball career runs batted in leaders
- List of Major League Baseball annual doubles leaders
