= George Alexander Sewell =

American professor and pastor (1910–1983)

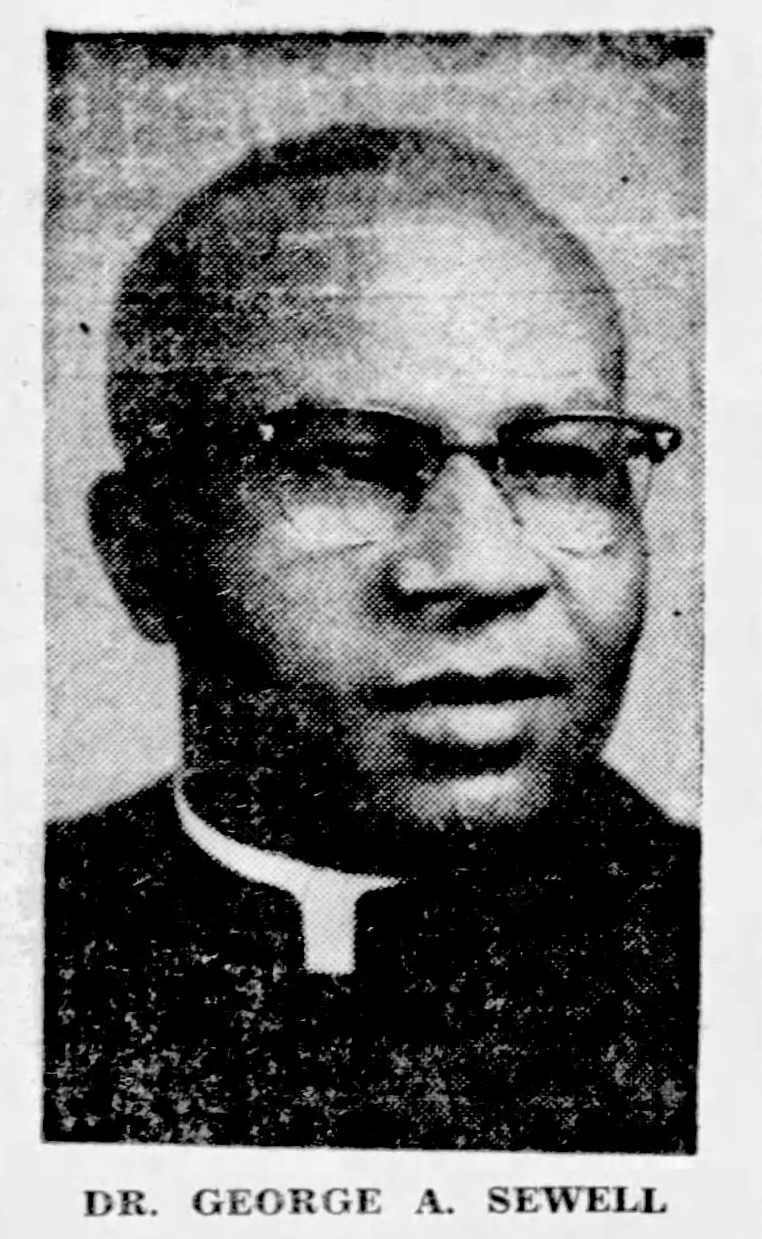
- Atlanta Daily World, Atlanta, Georgia, June 14, 1958
- Born: October 12, 1910; Newnan, Georgia
- Died: September 26, 1983 (aged 72); Atlanta, Georgia
- Occupations: Professor, college dean, AME pastor, author, historian
- Notable work: Mississippi Black History Makers (1977)

Dr. George Alexander Sewell (October 12, 1910 – September 26, 1983) was a teacher, professor, university administrator, pastor, historian, and author who worked in Florida, Georgia, and Mississippi in the United States. He served as the dean of Turner Theological Seminary at Morris Brown College in Georgia, and as the dean of social sciences at Alcorn State University in Mississippi. In addition to his work as a teacher and college administrator, he was simultaneously a pastor, serving throughout his life as a minister and elder in the African Methodist Episcopal Church. Dr. Sewell wrote newspaper columns for the Atlanta Daily World, and published two collections of sermons. In 1977, after retiring from Alcorn, he completed writing and published the still-in-print and highly regarded biographical dictionary Mississippi Black History Makers. He also wrote the major history of Morris Brown College, which was published shortly after his death in 1983.

== Biography ==
Sewell was born 1910 in Newnan, Georgia. He went to Booker T. Washington High School, graduating in 1930, and earned an A.B. degree from Morris Brown College in 1934. He established its student newspaper the Wolverine Observer. Sewell worked his way through college as a steam-press operator, a skill that he had learned from his father.

He later earned bachelor of sacred theology (BST) and master of sacred theology degrees (MST) from Boston University in 1944 and 1946, and an IL.D. from Monrovia College in 1955. Between degrees he wrote a weekly column called "Dots and Dashes" for the Atlanta Daily World newspaper. He earned a Ph.D. from Boston University in 1957. His Ph.D. was in New Testament Literature and Interpretation.

He began his career as principal-teacher in the junior high school of Jackson County, Florida, serving 1934 to 1942. He worked simultaneously as a minister. He later worked as college minister at Morris Brown, LeMoyne College in Memphis, and Arkansas State College at Pine Bluff. He was part of the A.M.E. Church. He served on the church's General Conference Commission and was secretary of its General Board of Education. Over his career he held the pastorate at St. Andrew's Methodist in Worcester, Massachusetts; Trinity A.M.E. in Atlanta; Gaines Chapel A.M.E. in Waycross, Georgia, and Steward Chapel A.M.E. in Macon. He was the dean of Turner Theological Seminary at Morris Brown in the 1950s and 1960s.

In 1961 Dr. Sewell was appointed dean of social sciences and became a professor at Alcorn State University, a historically black college or university (HBCU) in Mississippi. He taught there for 13 years. Simultaneously, he served as pastor for a series of Mississippi churches: Pearl Street A.M.E. in Jackson, the church in Port Gibson, and nine years as the pastor of Vicksburg A.M.E. Church. While resident in Mississippi, he served on the Mississippi Historic Preservation Professional Review Board, the Vicksburg Community Council, the Human Relations Council, the Advisory Board of the Vicksburg Housing Authority, and was a member of the Warren County Ministerial Association.

While resident in Mississippi, Sewell started researching notable Black people of Mississippi in libraries at Tougaloo College and Louisiana State University, as well as by making visits to sources in Holly Springs, Greenville, Yazoo City, et al. Sewell conducted interviews throughout the state, and then edited and rewrote the resulting accounts with support from a "federal research training grant." The first edition of his book Mississippi Black History Makers, published in 1977, contained 37 chapters recounting 50 historical biographies. Sewell wrote about Black politicians beginning during Reconstruction, religious leaders, writers, athletes, teachers, musicians, businesspeople, and writers. According to Margaret Dwight, who wrote the preface to the revised second edition of Mississippi Black History Makers, "Dr. Sewell began the project in the early 1970s when he was a distinguished professor of sociology at Alcorn State University." Longtime Memphis Commercial-Appeal history columnist Paul R. Coppock wrote that "Each public school and each library in Memphis and Mississippi ought to have a copy" of Mississippi Black History Makers. Sewell also wrote magazine articles, published collected sermons, and spent his last years researching and writing a history of Morris Brown.

Sewell died at Grady Memorial Hospital in Atlanta in 1983. The funeral was held at Flipper Temple AME Church in Atlanta.

== Historiography ==
The Atlanta University Center's Robert W. Woodruff Library has a collection of photographs and documents related to Sewell.

== Writings ==
- Mississippi Black History Makers (1977) Rev. ed. (1984) sponsored by Alcorn State, revised edition co-edited with Margaret L. Dwight, published by the University of Mississippi
- Morris Brown College: The First 100 Years
- A Motif for Living (1963)
- Where Are You Going? (1983)
