= Ernest Gillick =

English sculptor (1874–1951)

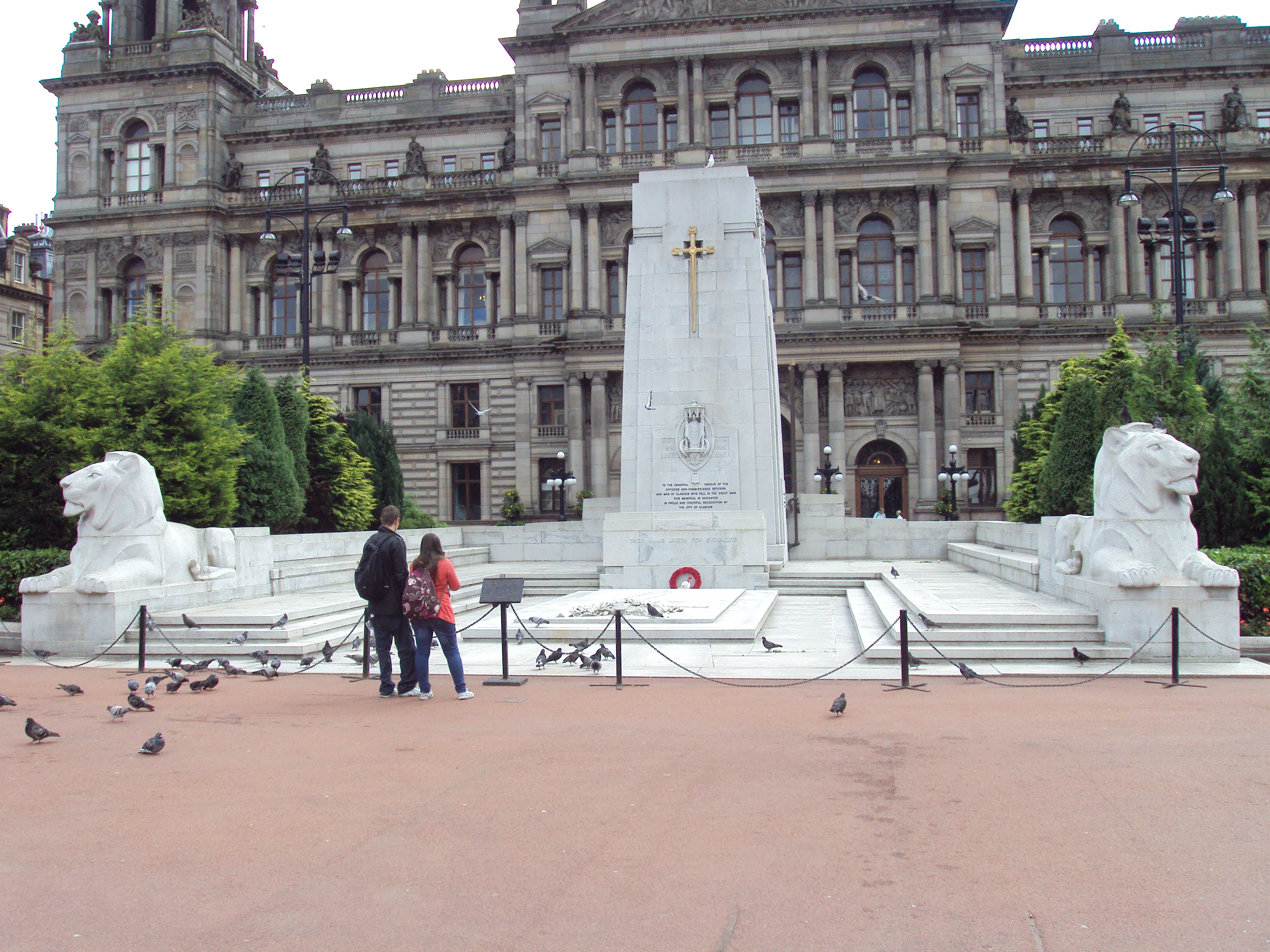
Gillick's cenotaph in Glasgow

Ernest George Gillick RA (19 November 1874 – 25 September 1951) was a British sculptor.

== Life ==
Gillick was born in Bradford, Yorkshire, on 19 November 1874, the son of a tailor. The family moved to Nottingham, where Gillick was apprenticed as a designer in around 1891. He studied at the Nottingham School of Art and the Royal College of Art in London. His first important commission was for the figures of J. M. W. Turner and Richard Cosway for the facade of the Victoria and Albert Museum in 1901.

He was a regular exhibitor at the Royal Academy and worked frequently as a medalist, as did his wife, Mary Tutin, whom he married in 1905. They had been students together at Nottingham.

He served on the Sculpture Faculty of the British School at Rome and on the Council of the Imperial Arts League. He was a member of the Art Workers Guild from 1916 until his death, being elected Master in 1935. He was elected an Associate of the Royal Academy in 1935, but never became a full Academician.

He died in London on 25 September 1951 aged 76.

== Works ==
=== Sculptures ===
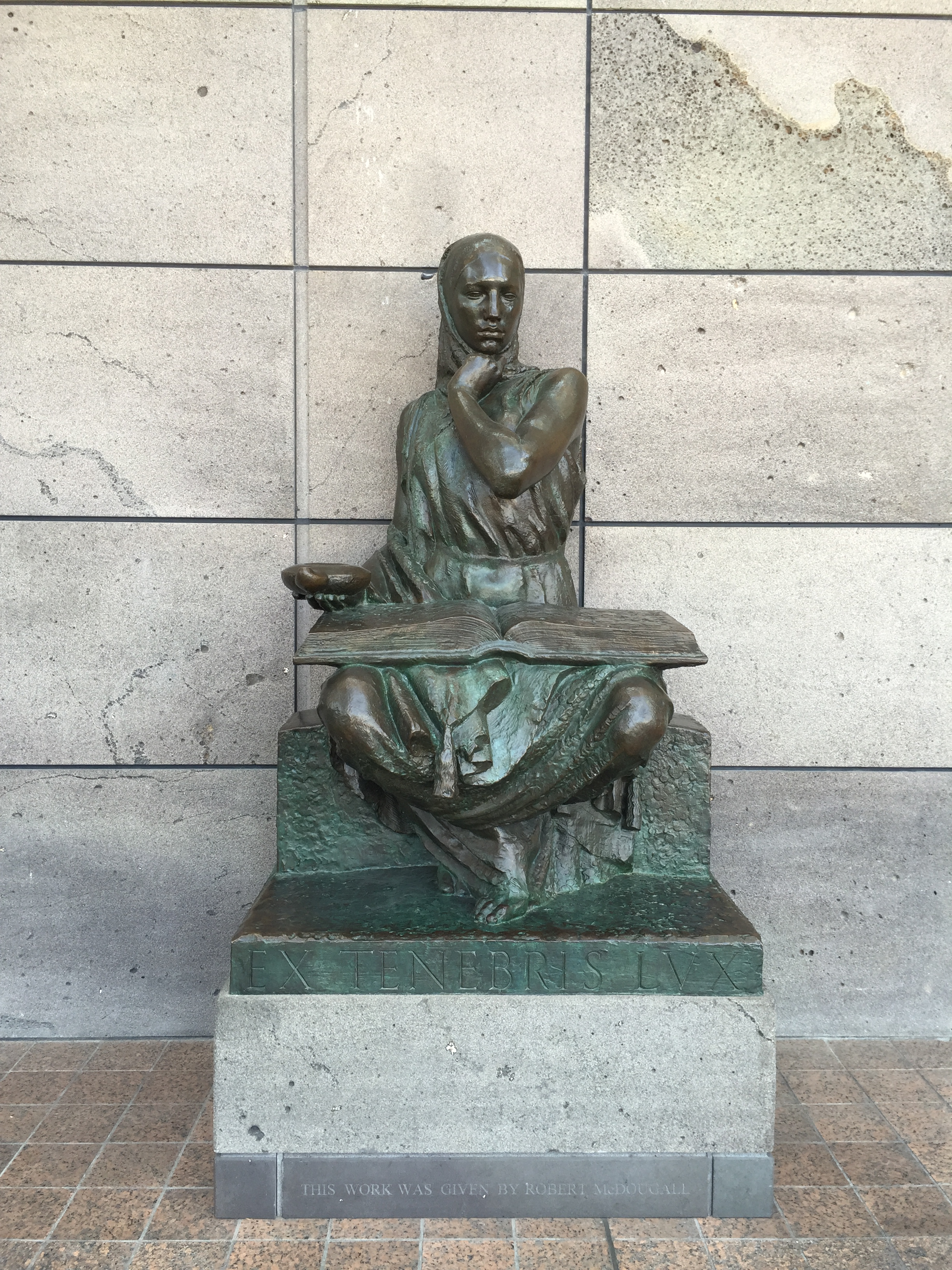
Ex Tenebris Lux (from darkness comes light). 1937. In Christchurch Art Gallery, New Zealand.

- The Cenotaph at George Square in Glasgow, 1921–1924.
- A sculptural group of Henry VII at Bosworth Field for the City Hall, Cardiff, (c.1919).
- Figures for the reredos in Winchester College Chapel, as part of the Winchester College War Memorial (1923).
- An allegorical group for the National Westminster Bank building in Princes Street, London of 1931–1932, notable for figures of Lower Mathematics and Higher Mathematics, in which the latter figure holds a sculpted magic square.
- Ex Tenebris Lux, 1937. Christchurch Art Gallery, New Zealand.
- Monument to the Missing, Vis-En-Artois British Cemetery, Haucourt, France.
- Statue of Sir Francis Powell in Mesnes Park, Wigan.
- Bust of Thomas Hellyer Foord for the Foord Almshouses at Rochester.

== Medals ==
- The Polar Medal (1904).
- The Tibet Medal, reverse. (1905).
- Royal Academy Schools Medal (c.1937).
