= Bill Sewell =

Bill Sewell may refer to:

- Bill Sewell (American football) (1916–1989), American football player
- Bill Sewell (politician) (1901–1980), Australian politician

== See also ==
- William Sewell (disambiguation)
