= Delkatla =

Coordinates: 54°01′00″N 132°08′00″W

Delkatla is a community on the east side of the mouth of Masset Inlet on Graham Island in the Haida Gwaii archipelago in British Columbia, Canada.

== Name origin ==
The community was named in association with Dal Ḵáahlii (formerly Delkatla Inlet), a small arm of Masset Inlet, from a X̱aad Kíl word meaning "water flowing in and out" or ""water drifting in to the inside" for the slough-like inlet which extends inland from the villages of Ka-yung and New Masset. The grassland at the head of the inlet is called Delkatla Flats. The inlet is also known as Delkatla Slough locally, and is fed by Delkatla Creek (a term which in times past was used interchangeably for inlets and bays).

== History ==
The first farm in Haida Gwaii was established on the east side of the flats in the 1880s. Though noted by Wilson Duff in 1954 as having on inhabitants, Delkatla began its life as a successful real estate promotion during a real estate and mining boom on Haida Gwaii in the late 19th and early 20th Centuries. The townsite was first registered in April 1913 by a Charles Wilson, who had first advertised it in 1911. During the settlement period, evidence that it must have been a large Haida settlement was found in the form of stone utensils and other artifacts being dug up by settlers.

Delkatla Wildlife Sanctuary takes up much of the area today.

== See also ==
- List of communities in British Columbia
- List of Haida villages
