= Mary A. Sewell =

New Zealand marine biology academic

Mary Anne Sewell
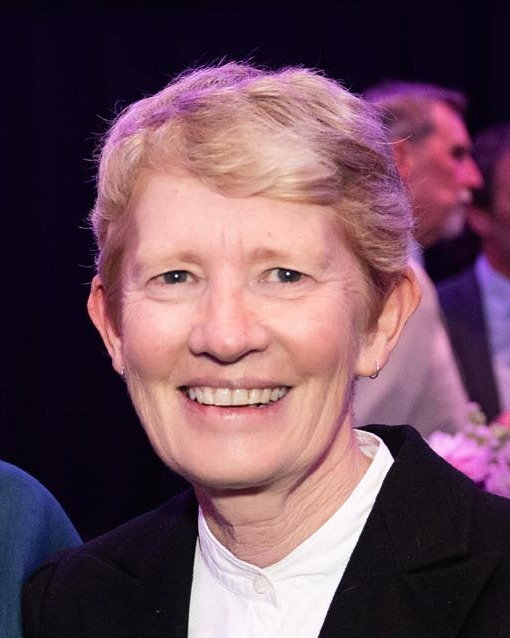
- Sewell in 2024
- Born: 1963 (age 62–63)
- Education: University of Alberta
- Scientific career
- Fields: marine biology
- Thesis: Reproductive cycle, sex change, and mortality during brooding of a viviparous sea cucumber Leptosynapta clarki (1993)

Mary Anne Sewell FRSNZ (born 1963) is a New Zealand marine biology academic. She is currently a full professor at the University of Auckland. In 2024 she was elected as a Fellow of the Royal Society Te Apārangi.

== Academic career ==
After a 1993 PhD titled 'Reproductive cycle, sex change, and mortality during brooding of a viviparous sea cucumber Leptosynapta clarki' at the University of Alberta, she moved to the University of Auckland, rising to full professor.

Sewell has spoken publicly on a number of marine issues, including shark finning and microbeads and plastic pollution

In 2024 Sewell was elected as a Fellow of the Royal Society Te Apārangi.

== Selected works ==
- Levitan, Don R., Mary A. Sewell, and Fu-Shiang Chia. "How distribution and abundance influence fertilization success in the sea urchin Strongylocentotus franciscanus." Ecology 73, no. 1 (1992): 248–254.
- Fendall, Lisa S., and Mary A. Sewell. "Contributing to marine pollution by washing your face: microplastics in facial cleansers." Marine pollution bulletin 58, no. 8 (2009): 1225–1228.
- Hofmann, Gretchen E., James P. Barry, Peter J. Edmunds, Ruth D. Gates, David A. Hutchins, Terrie Klinger, and Mary A. Sewell. "The effect of ocean acidification on calcifying organisms in marine ecosystems: an organism-to-ecosystem perspective." Annual Review of Ecology, Evolution, and Systematics 41 (2010): 127–147.
- Levitan, Don R., Mary A. Sewell, and Fu-Shiang Chia. "Kinetics of fertilization in the sea urchin Strongylocentrotus franciscanus: interaction of gamete dilution, age, and contact time." The Biological Bulletin 181, no. 3 (1991): 371–378.
- O’Donnell, Michael J., Anne E. Todgham, Mary A. Sewell, LaTisha M. Hammond, Katya Ruggiero, Nann A. Fangue, Mackenzie L. Zippay, and Gretchen E. Hofmann. "Ocean acidification alters skeletogenesis and gene expression in larval sea urchins." Marine Ecology Progress Series 398 (2010): 157–171.
