= Tommy Sewell =

American baseball player (1906–1956)

- Pinch hitter
- Born: April 16, 1906; Titus, Alabama, U.S.
- Died: July 30, 1956 (aged 50); Montgomery, Alabama, U.S.
- Batted: Left Threw: Right

MLB debut
- June 21, 1927, for the Chicago Cubs

Last MLB appearance
- June 21, 1927, for the Chicago Cubs

MLB statistics
- Games played: 1
- At bats: 1
- Hits: 0
- Stats at Baseball Reference

Teams
- Chicago Cubs (1927)

Thomas Wesley Sewell (April 16, 1906 – July 30, 1956) was an American professional baseball player who played in 1927 with the Chicago Cubs of Major League Baseball. He appeared in one game as a pinch hitter, going hitless in his only at-bat.

Sewell was born in Titus, Alabama, and died in Montgomery, Alabama. He attended the University of Alabama. He was the brother of Baseball Hall of Famer Joe Sewell and of Luke Sewell, and the cousin of Rip Sewell.
