= Michael Slade =

Michael Slade is a collaborative literary pseudonym used primarily by genre novelist Jay Clarke, most frequently in collaboration with John Banks. Clarke and Banks developed the pseudonym with Richard Covell in the early 1980s when shopping around the murder mystery novel Headhunter which was written by all three of them. Although multiple authors have worked in tandem under the pen name "Michael Slade" Clarke has also contributed enough solo work that the pseudonym is generally referred to as his primarily.

Fourteen of the novels published under the Michael Slade persona, between 1984 and 2009, comprise the "Special X" series in which various high-profile crimes are investigated by members of the fictitious Royal Canadian Mounted Police Special External Section. Slade has been described as "Canada's first international mainstream horror novelist."

== Background ==
Vancouver-based lawyers Jay Clarke (born May 28, 1947) and John Banks (born June 30, 1947) began to collaborate on commercial fiction in the early 1980s following an economic downturn caused by cuts to the Legal Services Society in British Columbia. Collaborating with Richard Covell, also a lawyer, the team wrote Headhunter, which was first published in England in 1984. Clarke, Banks, and Covell, who shared a law practice and a collective "32 years and 60 murder cases" between them, were inspired by the success of fellow lawyer-turned-author William Deverell's recent debut, Needles.

Before publishing Headhunter, Clarke and Brown had considered using the mononym DeClerq (a surname that would later be assigned to a recurring character in the Special X series). Clarke credits his wife, Lee, with devising "Michael Slade" impromptu: "Michael's a Biblical name - it has a certain sensitivity, I've never met a woman who didn't like it. And Slade: he's tough as nails." By the time the second Slade novel, Ghoul was being reviewed in 1988, the Vancouver Sun reported that Covell had left the writing team and that Lee Clarke had replaced him; Clarke has subsequently collaborated with his daughter Rebecca.

== Bibliography ==
=== RCMP "Special X" series ===
- Headhunter (1984)
- Ghoul (1987)
- Cutthroat (1992)
- Ripper (1994)
- Evil Eye (1996)
- Primal Scream (1998)
- Burnt Bones (1999)
- Hangman (2000)
- Death's Door (2002)
- Bed of Nails (2003)
- Swastika (2005)
- Kamikaze (2006)
- Crucified (2008)
- Red Snow (2009)

=== Stand-Alone Works ===
- Change (2000)
