= Cissie Sewell =

English actress

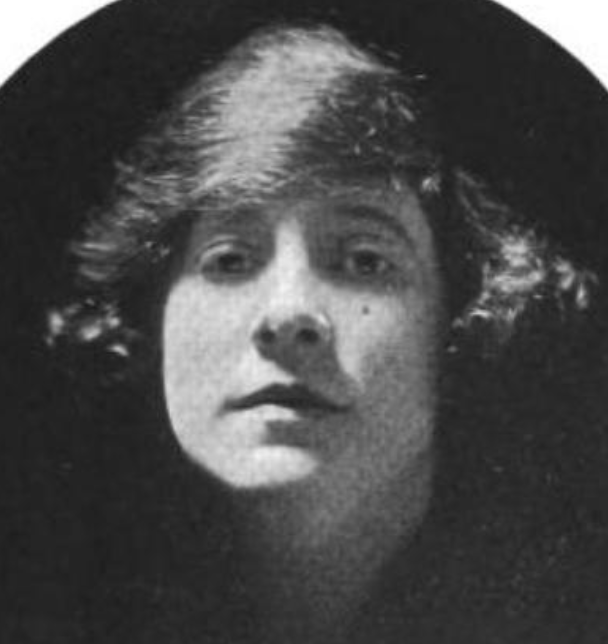
- Cissie Sewell, from a 1920 publication
- Born: about 1893; London
- Occupations: Actress, dancer, ballet mistress
- Known for: Longtime association with Noël Coward and Charles B. Cochran
- Spouse: Cyril Biddulph

Elizabeth H. "Cissie" Sewell (born about 1893 – died after 1954) was an English-born stage actress, dancer, and ballet mistress, wife of Irish-born Canadian performer Cyril Biddulph.

== Early life ==
Sewell was born in London. She trained as a dancer with Adeline Genée, and later with William C. Zerffi.

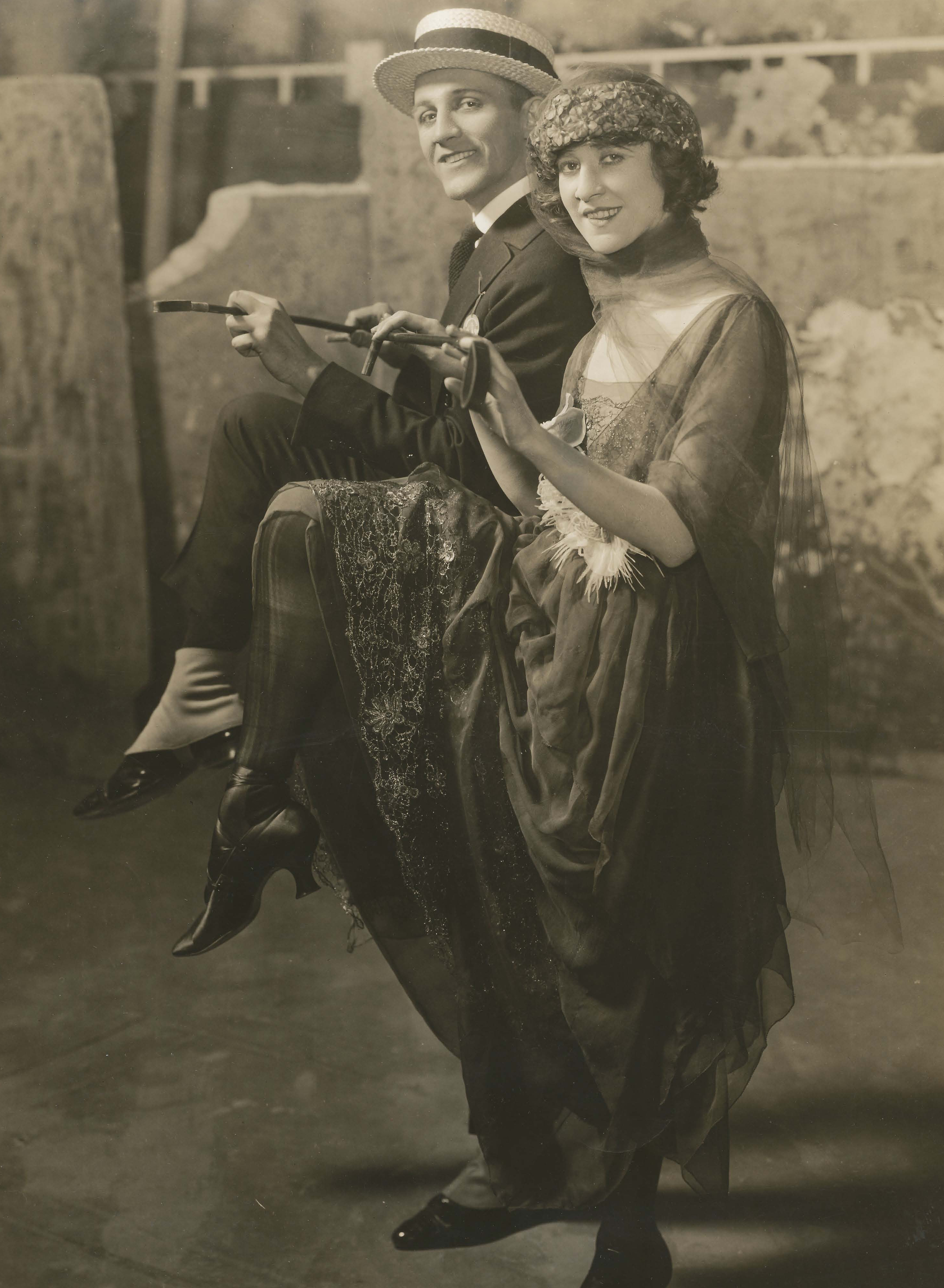
Photo of Mercer Templeton and Cissie Sewell in Broadway production of Honey Girl (1920)

== Career ==
Sewell appeared on the London stage as a child in Alice Through the Looking Glass (1903–1904), and created dances for the London production of the musical Kissing Time (1919). Her Broadway credits included roles in The Bachelor Belles (1910), A Winsome Widow (1912), The Girl from Montmartre (1912–1913), The Marriage Market (1913), The Girl from Utah (1914), Hitchy-Koo (1917), Her Regiment (1917), The Girl Behind the Gun (1918–1919), Miss Millions (1919–1920), and Honey Girl (1920).

Off-stage, Sewell endorsed musical instruments, and worked with playwright Noël Coward, music director Elsie April, and producer Charles B. Cochran, especially as ballet mistress on the American and Australian productions of Bitter Sweet. She was also ballet mistress for a London production of Lights Up! in 1940. "Cissie's memory was fantastic," recalled Noël Coward in his autobiography. "In addition to her other virtues, an outspoken critical faculty allied to the kindest heart imaginable."

She and her younger sister Georgie toured as a dancing act together. A third Sewell sister, Marie, was also an actress.

== Personal life ==
Sewell married Canadian-stage actor Cyril Biddulph in 1912. He died in World War I, in August 1918; he was a lieutenant in Princess Patricia's Canadian Light Infantry.

In 1920, when fire broke out in the Boston hotel where she was staying, she delayed her evacuation until she rescued a photograph of her late husband, "disregard[ing] her valuable jewels, clothing and bonds". Ellis Island immigration records state that Sewell remained an unmarried widow through at least 1923.
