= Jack Sewell =

English cricketer

Personal information
- Full name: Frederic John Sewell
- Born: 29 September 1913; Great Barrington, Gloucestershire, England
- Died: 18 November 2000 (aged 87); Cheltenham, Gloucestershire, England
- Batting: Left-handed
- Role: Batsman

Domestic team information
- Years: Team
- 1937: Gloucestershire

Career statistics
Competition	FC
Matches	4
Runs scored	113
Batting average
100s/50s
Top score
Balls bowled
Wickets
Bowling average
5 wickets in innings
10 wickets in match
Best bowling
Catches/stumpings
- Source: Cricinfo, 3 August 2013

Frederic John Sewell (29 September 1913 – 18 November 2000) was an English cricketer. He played four first-class matches for Gloucestershire in 1937.
