= Jack Sewell (rugby league) =

English rugby league footballer

Personal information
- Full name: John T. Sewell
- Born: c. 1926
- Died: 28 April 1955 (aged 29); Staincliffe General Hospital, Dewsbury

Playing information
- Position: Prop
Club
Years	Team	Pld	T	G	FG	P
≤1949–Nov 49	Dewsbury
Nov 1949–51	Batley
	Total	0	0	0	0	0

John T. Sewell (c. 1926 – 28 April 1955) was a professional rugby league footballer who played in the 1940s and 1950s. He played at club level for Leeds City Boys ARLFC, Dewsbury and Batley, as a prop.

== Playing career ==
Sewell was transferred from Dewsbury to Batley in November 1949, he played his last match for Batley, against Widnes at Naughton Park, Widnes on Saturday 24 March 1951, he sustained a head injury in the first-half of this match, and complained of a headache at half-time, but completed the match, however on the return journey by motor coach he became unconscious, and later suffered paralysis down one-side of his body, and aphasia (Loss of the ability to produce and/or comprehend language), and was subsequently transferred from Staincliffe General Hospital (near his home on Willians Road (off Halifax Road), Dewsbury) to Leeds General Infirmary, 4-years later he subsequently died from complications arising from his injury.
