= Vis-en-Artois =

- Commune
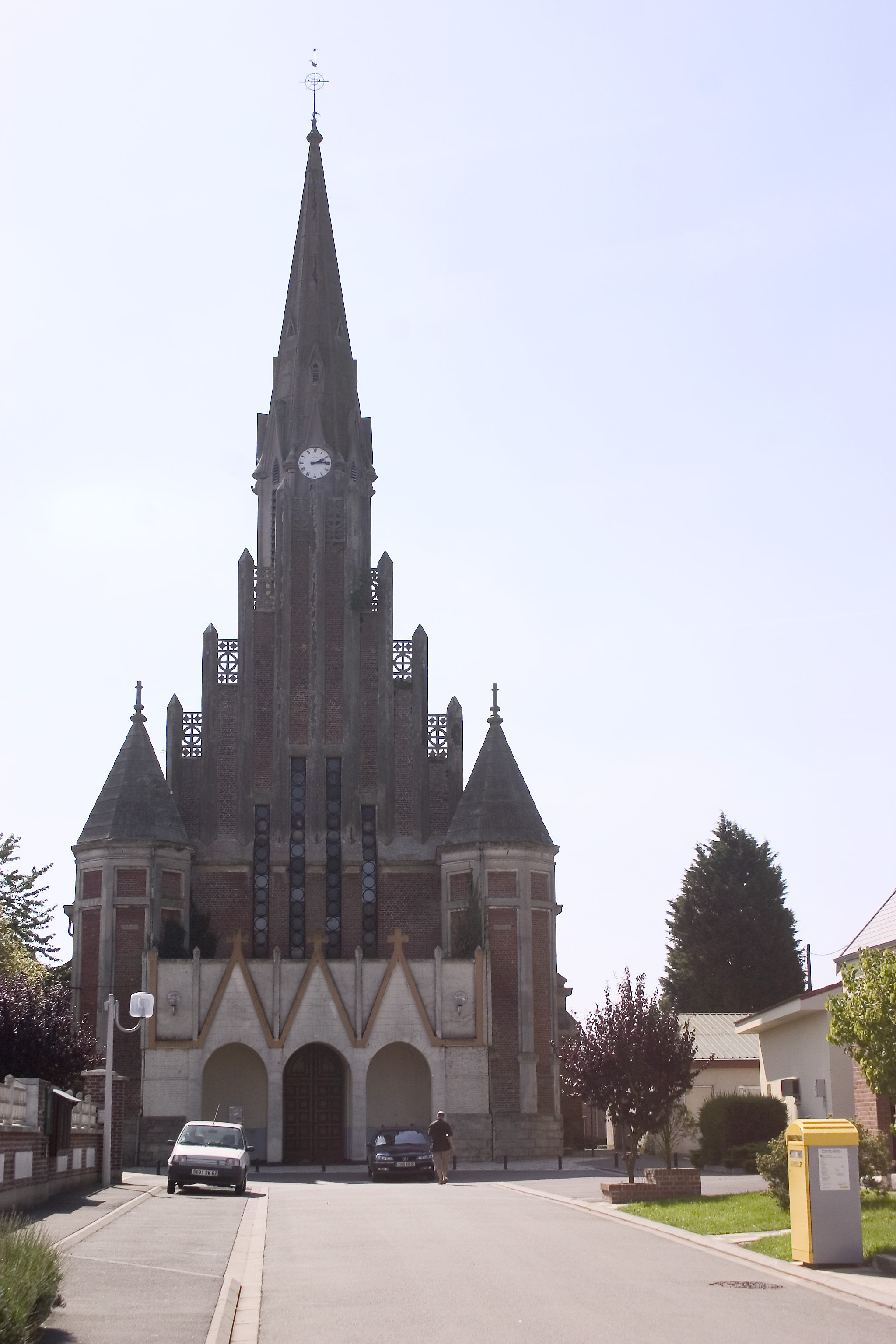
- The church of Vis-en-Artois

- Coat of arms
- Location of Vis-en-Artois
- Location within France Location within Hauts-de-France
- Coordinates: 50°14′52″N 2°56′27″E
- Country: France
- Region: Hauts-de-France
- Department: Pas-de-Calais
- Arrondissement: Arras
- Canton: Brebières
- Intercommunality: CC Osartis Marquion

Government
  - Mayor (2020–2026): Christian Thiévet
- Area^{1}: 6.42 km^{2} (2.48 sq mi)
- Elevation: 68 m (223 ft)
- Highest elevation: 88 m (289 ft)
- Lowest elevation: 46 m (151 ft)
- Population (2023): 632
  - Density: 98.4/km^{2} (255/sq mi)
- Time zone: UTC+01:00 (CET)
  - Summer (DST): UTC+02:00 (CEST)
- INSEE/Postal code: 62864 /62156
- ^{1} French Land Register data, which excludes lakes, ponds, glaciers > 1 km^{2} (0.386 sq mi or 247 acres) and river estuaries.

Vis-en-Artois (French pronunciation: [vis ɑ̃.n‿aʁtwa], literally Vis in Artois) is a commune in the Pas-de-Calais department in the Hauts-de-France region of France 8 miles (13 km) southeast of Arras.

== Population ==
Historical population
Year	Pop.	±% p.a.
1968	608	—
1975	617	+0.21%
1982	603	−0.33%
1990	539	−1.39%
1999	536	−0.06%
2007	585	+1.10%
2012	655	+2.29%
2017	654	−0.03%
2023	632	−0.57%
Source: INSEE

== See also ==
- Communes of the Pas-de-Calais department
