= Vicki Lee Soboleff =

Haida artist and dancer

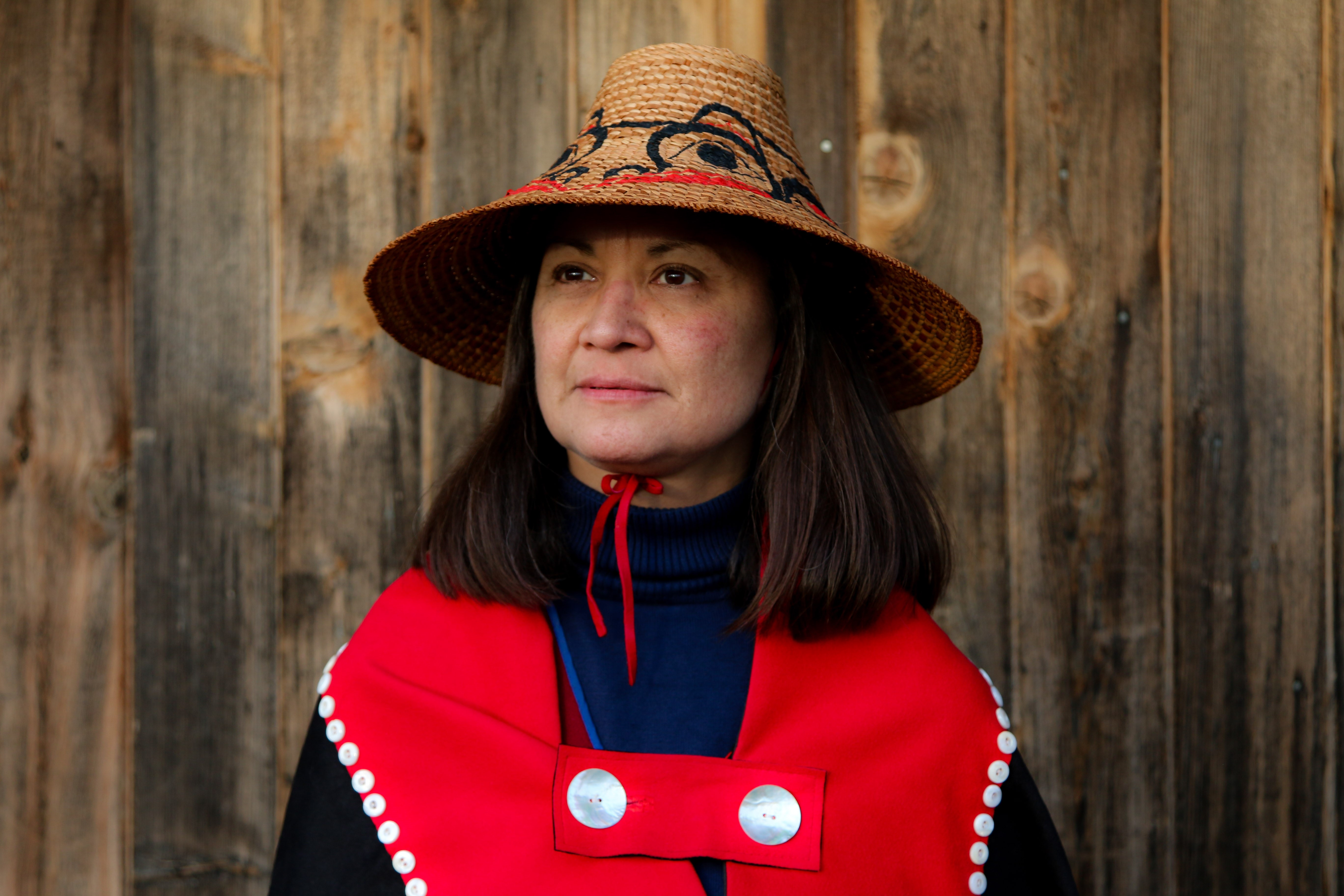
- Born: 1962 (age 63–64); Seattle, WA
- Citizenship: Haida; Tlingit
- Style: Basketry
- Website: https://vickisoboleff.com/

Vicki Lee Soboleff (born 1962) is a Haida and Tlingit artist, dancer, and teacher who specializes in Haida basketry. She was awarded the Margaret Nick Cooke Award in 2016 from the Alaska State Council on the Arts and the Alaska Humanities Forum for her work with Alaska Native dance.

== Biography ==
Soboleff was born in Seattle, Washington, and raised in Ketchikan, Alaska by Vesta Johnson, her grandmother. She is Haida Nation of the Brown Bear House. Starting from age 11, her grandmother alongside Nora and Robert Cogo passed down Haida traditions, songs, dances, and the Haida language to her.

== Career ==
Soboleff learned multiple forms of Haida crafts, including basketry from Selina Peratrovich, Delores Churchill, and Janice Criswell, how to make moccasins from Julia Fawcett, and beadwork from Beatrice Starkweather. She also worked with Cheryl Samuel and Kay Parker on Ravenstail weaving. During the COVID-19 pandemic, she created face masks woven from cedar. She told the Smithsonian that:

I decided to make a face mask because I was under the Washington State Stay at Home mandate, and many people began to sew face masks, but I am not an accomplished seamstress. I am, however, an experienced weaver of red and yellow cedar. One evening as I watched the news, the red and yellow cedar face mask came to me. I jumped up from my chair and began assembling the supplies. I had completed the first face mask by late evening, and I was incredibly happy with it.

During her 20s, she became a member of the Eagle/Raven dancers in 1985 before creating her own dance troupe in 1986 named the Yun Shu Kaa dancers. In 1995, she established the youth dance group, Lda Kut Naaz Sati Yatx'i (translating as "All Nations Children" in the Tlingit language) in Juneau, AK. The group has since grown to over 100 members total by 2019. She eventually left the ownership of the group to Barbara Dude in August 2015 and took up an advisor role. After moving to Washington in July 2017, she helped to organize the youth dance group, X̲aat'áay 'Wáadluwaan G̲aagáay (translating as "All Nations Children" in the Haida language) in 2018.

Along with her work in art and dance, she is grant manager of the Tulalip Tribes of Washington, is board member of the Sealaska Corporation and the Haida Corporation.

== Works ==
In 2020, a woven cedar mask created by Soboleff and titled Just Ovoid It was featured in an exhibition by First American Art Magazine and was chosen in April of that year to be featured in the Renwick Gallery at the Smithsonian American Art Museum. For the latter exhibit, the work was renamed to the Yellow Cedar Face Mask and was described as being made with yellow cedar forming the primary splints of the mask and braided sinew acting as the external ties holding the splints together.

== Achievements ==
In 2016, Soboleff received the Margaret Nick Cooke Award from the Alaska State Council on the Arts and the Alaska Humanities Forum. The award recognizes individuals who have furthered Alaska Native languages and arts. Her cedar mask was featured in the Smithsonian American Art Museum Renwick Gallery's 50th anniversary exhibition, This Present Moment: Crafting a Better World (2022–23) in Washington, DC. In April 2019, she was given the President's Everyday Hero Award from the Central Council of Tlingit & Haida Indian Tribes of Alaska.

== Collections ==
- Smithsonian American Art Museum: Yellow Cedar Face Mask
- National Museum of the American Indian: Face Mask
