= Lani Hotch =

Native American artist from Alaska

- Saantaas'
- Born: Lani Strong; 1956 (age 69–70); Klukwan, Alaska
- Citizenship: Chilkat Indian Village and United States
- Known for: basketry, Chilkat weaving, Ravenstail weaving
- Website: www.lanihotch-northwestcoasttextilearts.com

Lani Hotch, also known as Saantaas', Sekwooneitl and Xhaatooch, is a Tlingit basket maker and textile artist known for Chilkat weaving and Ravenstail weaving. She is based in Klukwan, Alaska.

== Biography ==
Lani Hotch was born in 1956 in Klukwan, Alaska to a Tlingit mother and a father from Northern California. She learned Chilkat weaving from her grandmother Jennie Warren during the mid-1970s but stopped when her grandmother died in March 1977. She began weaving again in 1990 when Cheryl Samuel came to Klukwan to teach Ravenstail weaving.

She has spent the majority of her adult life living in Klukwan with her children and husband. She specializes in basket weaving and uses spruce and root as materials. She has stated that she draws inspiration from her community and her local, natural scenic environment. Hotch began teaching classes about woolen weaving and felt application in her village, which she states "[passes] on the knowledge and skills I've learned. Students who learn these skills are then able to create their own dance regalia and hence, my teaching serves to strengthen the traditions of song and dance as well."

== Selected artworks ==
- The Klukwan Healing Robe
- Berner's Bay Robe
- The Basket Mother Robe

== Selected exhibitions ==
=== Solo exhibitions ===
- The Basket Mother Robe, The Spirit Wrestler Gallery, Vancouver Canada
- Berner's Bay Robe, the Jilkaat Kwaan Heritage Center, Haines Alaska

=== Group exhibitions ===
- The Klukwan Healing Robe
- Berries on a Sunshine Mountain, Time Warp, Vancouver Canada

== Collections ==
| Museum | Location |
|---|---|
| Sheldon Museum | Haines, Alaska |
| Jilkaat Kwaan Cultural Heritage Center | Haines, Alaska |

== Honors and awards ==
- In 2006 Lani Hotch placed second place for contemporary arts in the Sealaska Heritage Institute's Juried Art show.
- In 2011 Hotch won the Jennifer Easton Community Spirit Award from the First Peoples Fund.
- In April 2017 Hotch was proclaimed a "Culture Bearer" by the Chilkat Indian Village (her tribe) which was one her highest honors. To this day she remains the only person in her community to be given such honor
- In 2017 Hotch won the Alaska Governor's Award for Arts in Business Leadership.
- In 2017 Hotch won the Native Arts and Culture Foundation Mentor Artist Apprentice Fellowship.

== Publications ==
- Klukwan's Legacy of Warriors, Lani Hotch, [2014]
- Kaaya Haayi Hit, Lani Hotch, [2013]
- Kluwan Founding Fathers' Story, Lani Hotch. [2013]
- Uncle Albert's K̲u.éex', Lani Hotch, [2014]
- The Klukwan Healing Robe, Lani Hotch, [2013]
- Tsirku Héeni Naaxein = Tsirku River Woven Robe, Lani Hotch, [2014]
- Jilḵaat Héeni Naaxein = Chilkat River Woven Robe, Lani Hotch, [2014]
- Klehini Naaxein = Klehini River Woven Robe, Lani Hotch, [2014]
- Our life is close by our food, Lani Hotch, [2013]
