= Teri Rofkar =

Native American weaver and educator (1956–2016)

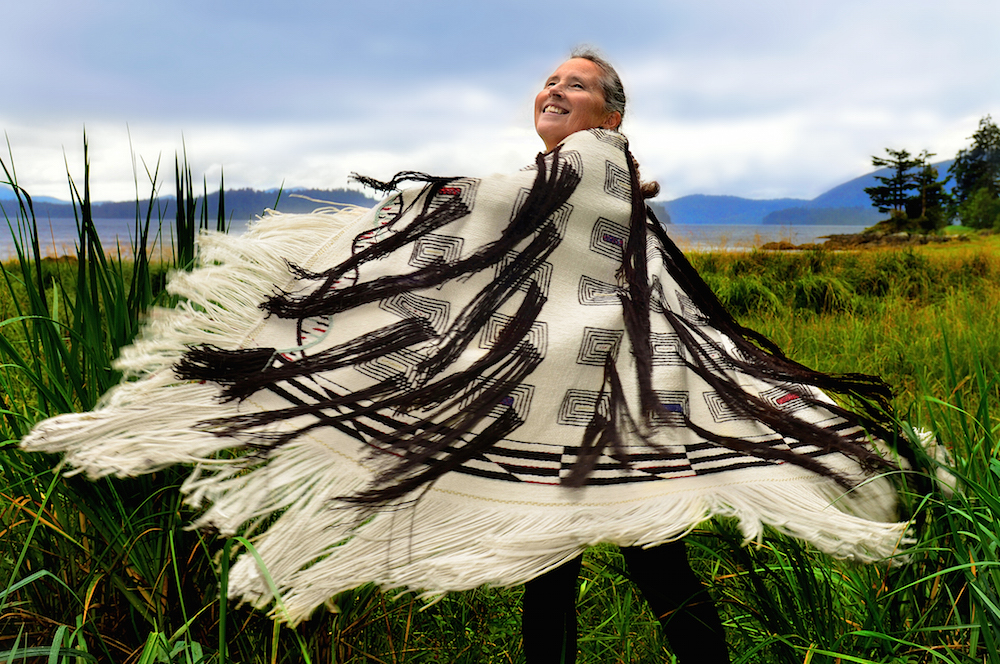
- Rofkar in 2016
- Born: Chas' Koowu Tla'a; September 27, 1956; San Rafael, California, U.S.
- Died: December 2, 2016 (aged 60)
- Known for: Weaving
- Spouse: Denny Rofkar
- Awards: see Awards section

Teri Rofkar, or Chas' Koowu Tla'a (1956–2016), was a Tlingit weaver and educator from Sitka, Alaska. She specialized in Ravenstail (Raven's Tail) designs and spruce root baskets.

Rofkar was born on September 27, 1956 in San Rafael, California and grew up in Pelican and Anchorage, Alaska. In 1976 she moved to Sitka, Alaska, the town her grandmother was born in, raising three children with her husband Denny Rofkar. She died on December 2, 2016, at age 60.

Rofkar learned weaving from her grandmother Eliza Mork, as well as Delores Churchill (Haida), Ernestine Hanlon-Abel (Tlingit) and Cheryl Samuel. She began her professional career as a weaver in 1986. She wove the first Tlingit robe made completely from mountain goat wool in more than two hundred years, but also worked with contemporary materials and technology.

== Methods of weaving ==
Rofkar specialized in twinning, a method of weaving, and a 6,000 year old practice. This method employed freehand looming, a long, continuous process that involves creating baskets and ceremonial robes from the roots of spruce trees.

== Activist life ==
Aside from her artwork, Rofkar was a community educator and researcher through her work as an artist and weaver. Throughout her life she cultivated awareness surrounding traditional Native American crafts by expanding the discourse surrounding them to include new stories and perspectives. Through this, Rokfar connected the histories of native people to the broader global community.

== Collections on display ==
Rofkar's works can be seen on display at the National Museum of the American Indian in Washington, D.C. and the Museum of the North in Fairbanks, Alaska.

== Awards and honors ==
- In 2004, Rofkar won the Governor's Award for Native Art in Alaska.
- In 2006, she was selected for a USA Fellowship from United States Artists in the Crafts and Traditional Arts category.
- She was a recipient of a 2009 National Heritage Fellowship awarded by the National Endowment for the Arts, which is the United States government's highest honor in the folk and traditional arts.
- In 2012, she received the Creative Capital Visual Arts Award.
- In 2013, she received both the Distinguished Artist Award from the Rasmuson Foundation and a Native Arts & Cultures Foundation Artist Fellowship.
- In 2004, Rofkar received an Ecotrust Indigenous Leadership Award.
