= Evelyn Vanderhoop =

Haida weaver from British Columbia (born 1953)

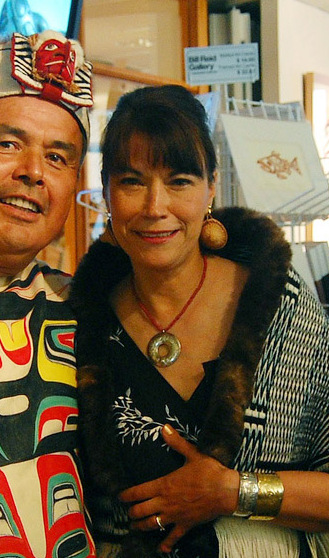
- Born: 1953 (age 72–73); Masset, British Columbia
- Citizenship: Haida Nation and Canadian
- Education: Western Washington University (BFA)
- Known for: Textile arts, painting
- Style: Chilkat weaving, Raven's Tail weaving
- Mother: Delores Churchill (Haida)
- Relatives: Selina Peratrovich, grandmother
- Website: evelynvanderhoopart.blogspot.com

Evelyn Vanderhoop (born in 1953) is a Haida Nation artist from Masset, British Columbia, Canada. She paints and is a textile artist, specializing in Chilkat weaving and Raven's Tail weaving.

Her work is in the collections of the Burke Museum of Natural History and Culture, the Museum of Fine Arts, Boston, and the Canadian Museum of History.

== Early life and background ==
Vanderhoop was born in Masset, British Columbia, in 1953. Her mother, Delores Churchill (Haida), was a prominent weaver, as was her grandmother Selina Peratrovich.

== Education ==
Vanderhoop earned her a Bachelor of Fine Arts degree from Western Washington University in Bellingham, Washington.

== Career ==
In her early career, she worked primarily as a painter, transitioning later into working as a textile artist. Her art practice includes researching and sharing cultural knowledge of Haida history. Vanderhoop specializes in Northern Northwest Coast art weaving.

In 2011, the Canadian Museum of History commissioned her to weave Sqalra Qwii Ghaalgyaat (English: Ripples in the Sky Robe) Raven's Tail Robe. She collaborated with her mother (Delores Churchill) and her two daughters.

In 2017, the Museum of Fine Arts, Boston commissioned a Raven's Tail dance robe from the artist.

== Public Collections ==
Her work can be found in the collections of Burke Museum of Natural History and Culture and the Haida Gwaii Museum, Skidegate, British Columbia.

== Personal ==
Vanderhoop has two daughters and one son, Carrie-Anne Vanderhoop Bellis (Haida/Wampanoag) and Tiffany Amber Vanderhoop (Haida/Wampanoag), and David Elliot Vanderhoop (Haida/Wampanoag).
