= Lily Hope =

Tlingit textile artist (born 1980)

Lily Hope (born 1980, Juneau) is an Alaska Native artist, designer, teacher, weaver, and community facilitator. She is primarily known for her skills at weaving customary Northwest Coast ceremonial regalia such as Chilkat robes and ensembles. She owns a public-facing studio in Juneau, called Wooshkindein Da.àat: Lily Hope Weaver Studio which opened downtown in 2022. Lily Hope is a mother of five children, and works six days a week.

== Biography and education ==
Lily Hope, also known as Lily Lalanya Hudson, was born and raised in Juneau, Alaska by full-time artists. She identifies herself as Tlingit Indian of the Raven moiety from her grandmother's clan, the T’akdeintaan. The clan originated from Snail House in Hoonah, Alaska. Her Lingít name is Wooshkindein Da.àat. Her mother, Clarissa Rizal, and artist Kay Parker, both well-known and also from Juneau, Alaska, taught her how to weave.

Clarissa Rizal (Tlingit, 1956–2016) was a weaver, painter, printmaker, carver, and sculptor. She was one of the last apprentices of the late master Chilkat weaver, Jennie Thlunaut (Tlingit, 1891–1986). In the 1990s, Thlunaut was one of few artists who still created Chilkat weaving. Thlunaut's knowledge of formline design was so thorough that she was able to create her own designs that followed those aesthetic rules. She taught this to Rizal, who in turn taught Hope how to weave in formline style. Hope's ties with her mother were strong to the point that they collaborated on an ensemble and won first place at an art show. Her sister, Ursala Hudson, is also a textile artist and fashion designer.

Hope studied communications and theater at University of Alaska Southeast from 2002 to 2007. Soon after college, she became a well-known Chilkat and Raventail weaver and teacher. She also acted and participated in the Alaskan Regional theater, Perseverance Theatre, whose mission is to “create professional theatre by and for Alaskans." They valued community engagement, cross-cultural collaboration, professional rigor, and regional voice. This ties in with Hope's commitment and dedication to her hometown.

She teaches weaving in Juneau, Yukon Territory, and down the coast of southeast Alaska. She is also a mother of five children.

== Artworks ==
Copper Child (2012) was her first Ravenstail ensemble, in which she collaborated with her mother Clarissa Rizal. It is made from Merino wool, rabbit fur, sea otter fur, and copper cones. It includes a robe, headdress, and apron. It fits a child. Its intent is for celebrations. It contains standing at the top of the mountain pattern repeating across the body of the robe, with Hope's 2002 design, shaman eyes, and Rizal's traditional lightning and Haida spider web designs. It had a run of exhibits and shows and won first place at Sealake Heritage Institute's Juried Art Show in 2012. It now holds a permanent spot in its collection.

Little Watchman (2014) is a child-size Chilkat ensemble that includes a headdress, leggings, a wool jacket adorned with epaulets, and a Chilkat face on the back. It exemplifies the mix of Ravenstail and Chilkat textiles. Chilkat robes used a modified Northwest Coast formline, and she weaves them by hand on an upright frame with no tools other than a tapestry needle to tuck in braids. And it is on display in the exhibition Reflections: Native Arts Across Generations at the Fralin Museum of Art. This exhibition's purpose was to bring together historic Native American art that was drawn from the collections of the Fralin Museum of Art with the work of several distinguished contemporary Native artists.

Lineage Robe (2017) thigh-spun Merino wool, cedar bark, hand-dyed merino wool, beaver fur is part of the collection of the Portland Art Museum. In the Northwest Coast, such as Alaska, British Columbia, Washington, the tribes believe in human and animal interactions were strong enough to the point that they could switch with each other. The Chilkat blanket is a woven cape, worn by high-ranking tribal members during civic and ceremonial occasions. Only the wealthy could make or own. Both men and women contributed to the process of creating the blanket. Men would design the pattern while the women would provide the cedar bark. It was considered a great privilege. The standard design is a white background with a bold black border and fringe on the lower portion. This also consisted of the formline style, which is a primary design from the Northwest. It consisted of darkly outlined shapes called ovoids. Ovoids are U or V-shapes. The blankets are in black, white, or red colors. But on this occasion, Hope mainly used the traditional designs of a Chilkat blanket but added in color to it to modernize it.

Heritage Robe (2017) is her first adult-size Chilkat robe. It took her 17 months, from 2016 to 2017, and more than 1,700 hours at her loom. It is one of four robes in the exhibition at Portland Art Museum, in Portland Oregon that are connected by the same teaching lineage. It mainly holds the same outlined shapes and characteristics from the Lineage Robe. Hope worked on the robe at SHI's Delores Churchill Artist-in-Residence Studio. While she was working on the project, her mother, Clarissa Rizal, died. The intention of the robe, according to Hope, is to help build international awareness and recognition of Chilkat weaving. Tlingit children and grandchildren could learn more about their ancestry.

Giving Strength Robe (2019) 5-inch-by-5-inch squares to create a traditional indigenous robe. This is a collaboration with many Chilkat and Ravenstail weavers from all over North America. The concept originally came from Heidi Vantrease, the project organizers include Hope, Deanna Lampe, and Ursala Hudson. Ursala Hudson is Hope's sister who is an artist and a graphic designer who photographs and paints. She is also a mother and contributes to society by working as president and one of the founders of Pagosa Peak Open School, the community's charter school. The intention is to bring weavers together to bring in strength and for survivors to be able to heal. The completed robe will be given to Aiding Women in Abuse and Rape Emergencies (AWARE), Juneau's gender-inclusive shelter for survivors of gender-based violence. This project was mildly based on Clarissa Rizal's “Weavers Across the Water's robe”, which also brought weavers together to create a robe to fight for a cause.

In 2025, Hope received attention for creating miniature Ravenstail regalia for Labubu collectible toys.

== Exhibitions ==
- "Sharing Honors and Burdens: Renwick Invitational 2023," Renwick Gallery Smithsonian Institution. May 26, 2023 - March 31, 2024.
- "Exhibit On The History Of Northern Northwest Coast Weaving," Alaska State Museum. May 1- October 10, 2020.
- "Reflections: Native Arts Across Generations," The Fralin Museum of Art. May 24, 2018 - January 27, 2019.
- “The Art of Resilience: The Continuum of Tlingit Art," Portland Art Museum. 2016 - 2017.
- "Interwoven Radiance, Center for Contemporary Native Art," Portland Art Museum. November 10, 2017 – June 24, 2018

== Collections ==
Hope's work is included in the following public collections.

- Portland Art Museum, Portland, Oregon
- The Fralin Museum of Art, Charlottesville, Virginia
- Sealaska Heritage Institute, Juneau, Alaska

== Awards ==
- 2026 United States Artists Fellowship
- 2022 Artist-in-Residence at Institute of American Indian Arts, January 20 - Feb 8 2022
- 2021 SHIFT award from Native Arts and Cultures Foundation “Protecting the Material Sovereignty of Our Indigenous Homelands" ”
- 2018 Mentor Artist Fellowship
- 2017 Bill Holm Research Grant
- 2012 Sealaska Heritage Institute's Juried Art Show

== See also ==
- Ursala Hudson
- Northwest Coast art
- Indigenous peoples of the Northwest Coast
- Indigenous textile art of the Americas
