= Selina Peratrovich =

Haida artist (1890–1984)

- Ilst'ayaa
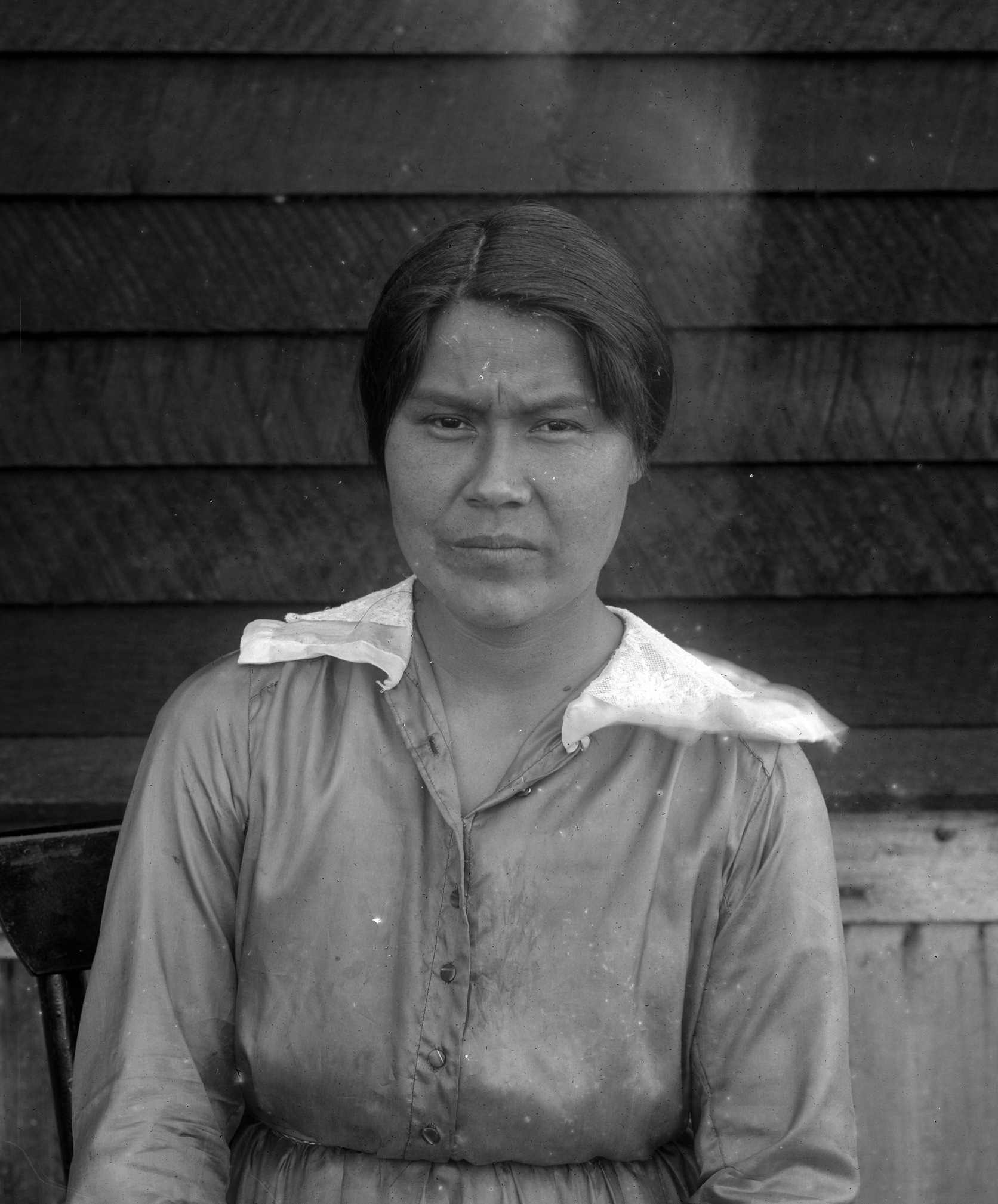
- Born: 1889 or 1890; Old Massett
- Died: December 23, 1984
- Relatives: Delores Churchill (daughter); Primrose Adams (daughter in law); Evelyn Vanderhoop (granddaughter); Lisa Telford (granddaughter); Lisa Hageman Yahgulanaas (great grand-daughter)

Selina Victoria Harris Adams Peratrovich (1889/1890 – 1984, Haida: Ilst’ayaa), also recorded in museum collections as Mrs. Alfred Adams was a Haida weaver and teacher. Born in Old Masset, in British Columbia, she was raised in Howkan, Alaska, before being returned to Canada as a teenager to marry Alfred Adams. During her marriage, she learnt how to weave from her mother in law, Elizabeth Adams; after her second marriage she settled in Ketchikan, Alaska. She became known as a weaver and teacher and is credited with preserving the art of Haida basket weaving.

Peratrovich died in 1984 at the age of 95. Her students include weavers such as Delores Churchill, Isabel Rorick, Florence Davidson, Vicki Lee Soboleff, Clarissa Rizal, April Churchill, Primrose Adams, and Evelyn Vanderhoop, and her work is in the collections of several museums in the United States and Canada.

== Life ==
Selina Peratrovich was born Selina Victoria Harris in 1889 or 1890 (Note: Peratrovich's delayed birth registry, registration number 1890-09-995828, gives her birthday as April 1, 1890.) to a G̱aw Git'ans Eagle Clan in Old Masset, on the Queen Charlotte Islands (now Haida Gwaii). She and her mother moved to the Haida village of Howkan, on Prince of Wales Island in Alaska, where Peratrovich grew up, after her mother married Protestant minister Sam Davis. Growing up, she was punished in school for speaking the Haida language she was fluent in. Peratrovich was raised by her grandmother, who avoided teaching her how to weave to prevent her from marrying at a young age. At the age of fifteen, however, Peratrovich's paternal family took her back to Canada to marry the around 32 year old Alfred Adams, a teacher, lumber worker, lay preacher, and store owner. She returned to her mother in Alaska on multiple occasions to finish her schooling, before marrying Adams at age seventeen.

She and Adams settled in Masset, where they ran a general store together. They had ten children together. Her first child died as an infant and her mother, grandmother, brother, sister and brother's children died in the 1918 flu pandemic. She and Adams adopted her sister's surviving children. Another of her children served in World War II. After Adams's death in 1945, a man from Southeast Alaska by the name of Peratrovich proposed to her and she accepted.

In the later years of her life, Peratrovich's eyesight deteriorated and she developed arthritis. She died on December 23, 1984, at the age of 95. At least five of her children had predeceased her.

== Weaving ==
Peratrovich was a weaver who worked with spruce root and cedar bark, though she found the former more difficult. Some of her later works are identifiable through a characteristic running guilloche motif. She returned to Haida Gwaii twice a year to gather materials; in her later years, she and her daughter, fellow weaver Delores Churchill, would hike through the Tongass National Forest for supplies, which Peratrovich would select.

Peratrovich was not allowed to watch her own mother work, as basket making was not traditionally performed with children nearby. It was during her marriage to Adams that Peratrovich first learned how to weave; after two years of requesting that her new mother in law, Elizabeth Adams, teach her, Elizabeth Adams finally agreed. She sold her baskets in Vancouver, while her husband was in the city attending teacher conferences. To prevent her children from interfering in her work, she would hire a babysitter. She did teach weaving classes at her daughter, Delores Churchill's school; the young Churchill lost interest in weaving, however, after her mother made her burn substandard baskets and gave the $5 she won in a weaving competition to another child. Churchill finally learned to weave at the age of 42, after enrolling in a class Peratrovich was teaching; Peratrovich initially attempted to deny her entry, but was told by the school that she had to accept her daughter as a student.

After her second marriage, Peratrovich became known as a teacher of other basket makers; she began teaching because she didn't want the art of Haida basket weaving to be lost. She settled in Ketchikan, where she taught classes at the Ketchikan Community College. She also taught classes with her daughter, Delores Churchill; both women exhibited their work consulted with museums, and taught workshops and gave lectures on Haida basket weaving across Alaska, the rest of the United States, and Europe. She was subject to an National Endowment for the Arts-funded study on the art of basket weaving and, in 1983, was presented with an Alaska Governor's Award in art for her work preserving Haida basket making and raising awareness of it. Her weaving also won awards at the Anchorage Historical and Fine Arts Museum (1973), the Alaska Festival of Native Arts (1973), and the Heard Museum (1974). The year before she died, she and Churchill went to Hawai'i for the "Pacific Basketmakers: A Living Tradition" exhibit.

Some of Peratrovich's baskets were in a collection acquired by the Royal Ontario Museum in 1924 and a practice hat she made from cedar root was purchased by the Anchorage Historical and Fine Arts Museum. Her work is in the collections of museums across the United States, Canada, and Europe, including the British Museum and the Alaska State Museum. In 2015, work she had produced that had been painted by Tlingit aritst Nathan Jackson was given to the Tongass Historical Museum in Ketchikan.

== Legacy ==
Peratrovich is credited with maintaining the art of Haida basket weaving and, in the 1980s, was one of the most respected Haida weavers alive, known to both Alaskan and Canadian Haida groups. Peratrovich taught weavers such as Isabel Rorick (her granddaughter), Florence Davidson, Vicki Lee Soboleff, Clarissa Rizal, April Churchill (granddaughter), Primrose Adams (her daughter in law), Evelyn Vanderhoop (granddaughter) and daughter Delores Churchill. Peratrovich's other granddaughters also include weaver Lisa Telford and her great grand daughter, Lisa Hageman Yahgulanaas, is a weaver as well.

After her death, the 1985 University of Alaska Museum in Fairbanks and Institute of Alaska Native Arts-organized travelling exhibition "Interwoven Expressions" was dedicated to her and displayed two of her hats.
