= Ursala Hudson =

- Style: Chilkat weaving, Ravenstail
- Mother: Clarissa Rizal
- Website: kadusne.com

Ursala Hudson is an Alaska Native textile artist, graphic designer, and fashion designer. She also photographs and paints. She creates Chilkat weaving, including dance regalia, belts, collars, and earrings.

== Biography and education ==
Hudson identifies as being of European, Filipina, and Alaska Native descent. She is Tlingit of the Raven moiety from her grandmother's clan, the T’akdeintaan. The clan originated from the Snail House in Hoonah, Alaska.

Her mother, Clarissa Rizal was an artist and weaver. Since Hudson lived in Colorado instead of Alaska, she questioned her right to weave in Northwest styles but gradually established her weaving practice, acknowledging her state of diaspora. She began weaving a few years before 2022. Her sister, Lily Hope, is also a well-known textile artist.

Hudson lives in Pagosa Springs, Colorado. She is a mother and serves as the president and one of the founders of Pagosa Peak Open School, the community's charter school.

== Artworks ==
Giving Strength Robe (2019) is a collaboration with many Chilkat and Ravenstail weavers from all over North America. The concept originally came from Heidi Vantrease, the project organizers include Lily Hope, Deanna Lampe, and Ursala Hudson. The completed robe will be given to Aiding Women in Abuse and Rape Emergencies (AWARE), Juneau's gender-inclusive shelter for survivors of gender-based violence.

== Exhibitions ==
- 2023: Sharing Honors and Burdens: Renwick Invitational 2023 (2023–24), Renwick Gallery, Smithsonian Institution
- 2022: Self-Determined: A Contemporary Survey of Native and Indigenous Artists, Center for Contemporary Arts Santa Fe, New Mexico
  - SWAIA Santa Fe Indian Market, Shiny Drop Gala Centennial Party
- 2021: In the Spirit of Contemporary Native Arts (2021), Washington State History Museum, Tacoma, WA

== Awards and honors ==
- 2022: Artist in Business Leadership Fellow from the First Peoples Fund
- IAIA/SHI Artist-in-Residence in Santa Fe, January 20–February 8, 2022
- 2021: LIFT Early Career Support for Native Artists, Native Arts and Cultures Foundation
- Best in show, In the Spirit of Contemporary Native Arts (2021), Washington State History Museum, Tacoma, WA
- 2020: Category Winner, Tidal Celebration Juried Art Show, 2020
