= Peratrovich =

Peratrovich is a surname of Serbian origin. Notable people with this surname include:

- Elizabeth Peratrovich (1911–1958), American activist
- Frank Peratrovich (1895–1984), American politician
- Selina Peratrovich (1889 or 1890–1984), Haida weaver
