= X'unéi =

Tlingit chief in Yakutat, Alaska c. 1791

X'unéi, also spelled as X'unei and sometimes known as Juné, was a powerful chief of the Tlingit at Yakutat in 1791.

== War against Yeilxaak ==
Chief X'unéi was encountered by Alejandro Malaspina's Spanish expedition to Yakutat in 1791 under the name of Juné. He is also mentioned in Tlingit oral histories as the head of the L'ukwnax.ádi clan and is known for leading the L'ukwnax.ádi in a long, bloody war against the Gaanaxteidee clan of Klukwan led by the powerful chief Yeilxaak. Yeilxaak was killed during this war in 1791.
