= Anna Brown Ehlers =

Chilkat weaver

- Born: 1955 (age 70–71); Juneau, Alaska, U.S.
- Known for: Chilkat weaving
- Notable work: Largest Chilkat blanket (orca motif, 2017)
- Style: Northwest Coast art
- Awards: Community Spirit Award (First People's Fund, 2001); United States Artists Fellow (2006); Rasmuson Foundation Fellowship (2009); National Heritage Fellowship (National Endowment for the Arts, 2017); Luce Indigenous Knowledge Fellow (2023); Distinguished Artist (Rasmuson Foundation, 2023)

Anna Brown Ehlers (born c. 1955) is a Chilkat weaver from Juneau, Alaska. A native Tlingit, she has taught the unique Northwest coast art form of Chilkat weaving to prevent the craft from dying out. She has been widely recognized for her work, and was awarded a National Heritage Fellowship by the National Endowment for the Arts in 2017.

== Biography ==
Anna Brown Ehlers was born in Juneau, Alaska a member of the Tlingit tribe. As a child she grew up watching her grandmothers Mary Betts and Marie Peters practice beading and sewing of traditional hides. At age four, she saw her uncle, a veteran of WWII wearing a Chilkat blanket in a parade, and knew she wanted to dedicate her life to crafting the unique blankets.

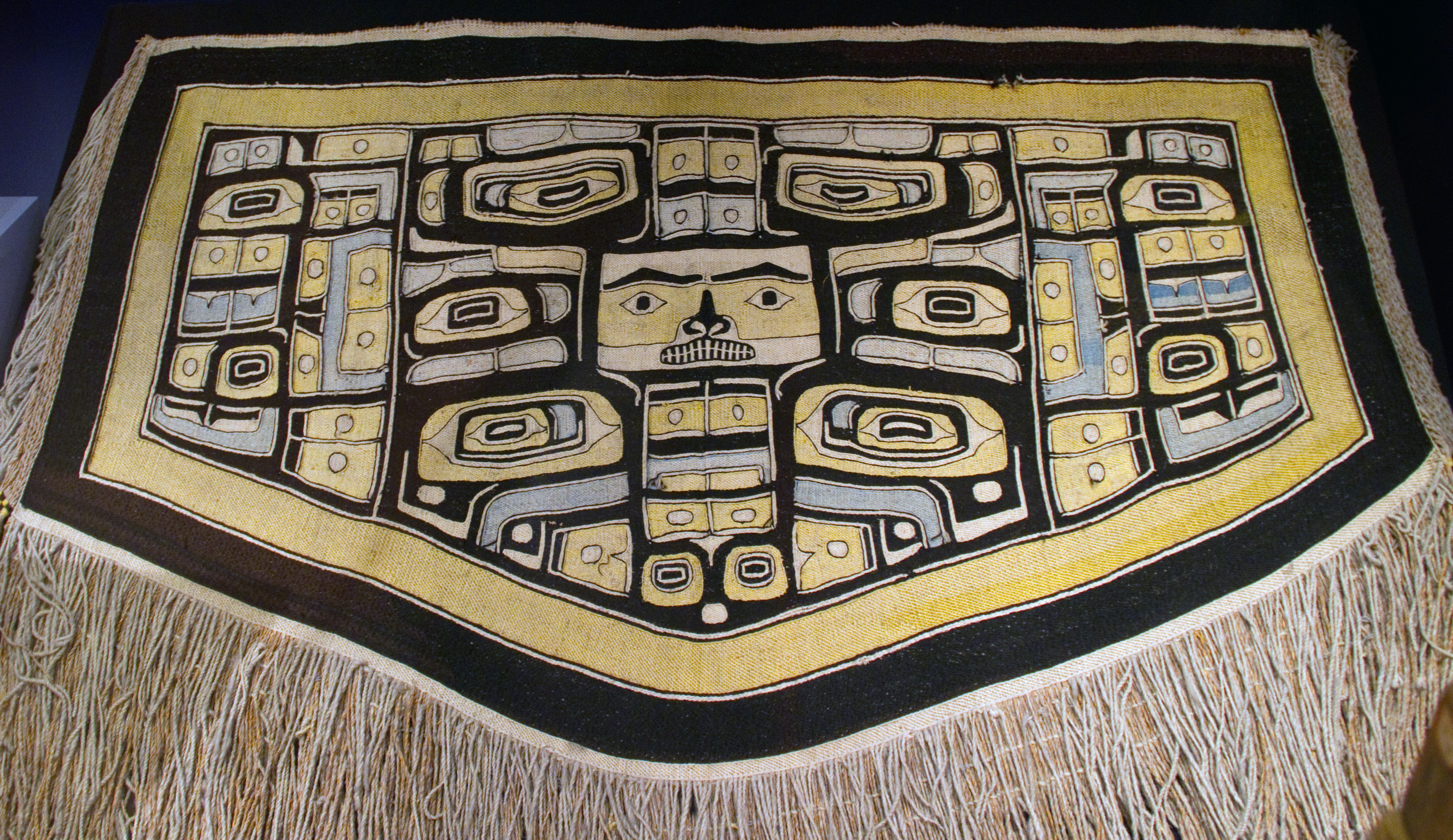
Historical example of Chilkat weaving similar to the style practiced by Anna Brown Ehlers

=== Chilkat weaving ===
Ehlers has specialized in the unique craft of Chilkat weaving for over 35 years. Chilkat blankets and weavings take an important ceremonial role in Tlingit tribal life at potlatch ceremonies. They are made with mountain goat hides, yellow cedar bark and traditionally dyed wools.

She developed her skills by apprenticing under master weaver Jennie Thlunaut. Thulunaut was one of the last of the Tlingit to practice the art, which she shared with Ehlers to prevent it from being lost. In 1984, she left her job to pursue weaving full time. Chilkat blankets can take a year or more to create.

Ehlers is known for using unique materials in her Chilkat blankets, including gold thread. The use of gold thread in her designs came from a dream shared by her daughter. She describes the meaning of the blankets she creates,

“Our blankets say who we are. The designs include our tribal crests and our relation to the land. When you wear it, it connotes your ancestry and people know who you are. It’s not about ownership, it’s about relationship.”

Ehlers additionally works to restore historical Chilkat weavings that have been acquired by museum collections.

=== Honors ===
In 2001 she received a Community Spirit Award from the First People's Fund. In 2006, she was named a United States Artists Fellow. It would be the first year that the United States Artists organization would recognize an Alaska-native artist.

In 2009 she received a Fellowship from the Rasmuson Foundation.

In 2017 she was recognized by the National Endowment for the Arts and awarded a National Heritage Fellowship for her expertise in Chilkat weaving. In honor of the award, she weaved the largest Chilkat blanket in history, depicting an orca whale motif spanning eight feet wide and seven feet tall.

In 2023 she was named a Luce Indigenous Knowledge Fellow. That year, she was named a Distinguished Artist by the Rasmuson Foundation. With the award, she planned to weave the largest Chilkat blanket in tribal history.

== Exhibitions ==
- 2020 - Echoes and Reverberations, at The Fabric Workshop and Museum
