= Jennie Thlunaut =

Tlingit textile artist (ca. 1891–1986)

- Shaxʼsaani Kéekʼ
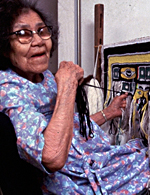
- Thlunaut in 1986
- Born: May 18, 1891; Lax̱acht'aak, Alaska
- Died: March 6, 1986 (aged 98)
- Spouses: John James (m. 1905–1920) John Mark Thlunaut (m. 1922–1952)
- Awards: National Heritage Fellowship (1986)

Jennie Thlunaut (c. 1891–1986) was a Tlingit artist, who is credited with keeping the art of Chilkat weaving alive and was one of the most celebrated Northwest Coastal master weavers of the 20th century.

== Biography ==
Jennie Thlunaut, or Shaxʼsaani Kéekʼ ("Younger Sister of the Girls"), was born on 18 May 1890, 1891, or 1892, depending on the source. She was born in Lax̱acht'aak, in the Jilḵaat Ḵwaan (Chilkat Territory), Southeast Alaska, where she led a typical Tlingit childhood, being outdoors and playing at the beach. She hunted and fished with her family, as well as gathered native plant foods, such as berries or wild celery. Jennie's parents were Matthew (Yaandakinyeil) and Ester (Yaandakinyeil) Johnson. Jennie's mother was Eagle moiety of the Wolf House (G̱ooch Hít) in Angoon, to which Jennie was born. Jennie's father was G̱aanaax̱teidí clan in the Frog House (Xíxchʼi Hít) in Klukwan. Jennie grew up in Klukwan in the Frog House. As a young girl Jennie showed interests in making baskets, moccasins, doing beadwork, and in weaving by the make-believe games she played with her friends. Her mother fostered those interests by teaching her how to do those arts. Jennie has become widely recognized especially for her skill as a Tlingit weaver of Chilkat blankets. She received her first batch of mountain goat hair as a child and her mother taught her weaving when she was only 10 years old.

Jennie was married by arrangement at the age of thirteen in 1905 to John James, a Gaanax̱teidí man from the Shakes (Shéiksh) family in Wrangell. Jennie's parents gave the Chilkat blanket with the frog crest that Jennie and her mother had made in 1902 to John James at their traditional Tlingit wedding. Jennie and John James had three daughters, Kathryn, Edith, and Edna. John James became ill with something that Jennie described as "funny sick" in 1920 and, after two months in the hospital in Haines, died. Before he died John James had a dream premonition, which he told Jennie about, that she would be able to take care of herself, and so he died peacefully in knowing his spouse would be all right.

Jennie remarried in 1922 to John Mark Thlunaut, with whom she moved into the Raven House (Yéil Hít) of the Lukwaax̱.ádi clan in Haines. Jennie and John had one surviving daughter, Agnes.

John Mark Thlunaut died in 1952, and Jennie moved out of the Raven house at Haines to a small house by the river in Klukwan. In 1973 Jennie moved to a new house that was "constructed by the Tlingit and Haida Housing Authority under the HUD program," but its location away from the river was inconvenient for her, and she split her time between the two houses.

Jennie was active in church and civic affairs and in traditional Tlingit ceremonies and potlatches throughout her life and has "been recognized for her life-long dedication to her home, family, people, and culture."

== Weaving ==
Jennie finished a blanket that had been started by her mother and had been passed to Jennie after her mother died in 1908. She sold her first finished blanket for $50. Jennie made her own first blanket from start to finish in 1910 while living "in a tent" in Ketchikan where she and her husband were fishing for the summer. When her daughter attended Sheldon Jackson School, Jennie paid the tuition with a blanket she wove featuring a frog emerging from winter hibernation.

Jennie made more than fifty blankets and twenty-five tunics in her seventy-five-year-long career. Jennie was a prolific weaver, and while traditionally a Chilkat blanket would take a full year to finish, Jennie was able to finish many blankets while preserving subsistence foods, holding down a job, and raising her children. Jennie sold some of her work, but much of her work was given as gifts to her family. Chilkat blankets are traditionally woven with mountain goats wool (dyed with tree lichens, oxidized copper, and urine steeped hemlock bark) and red cedar bark. Men traditionally provided the materials for the weavings, and the women prepared the materials and made the weavings. Jennie spun all of her own yarn in the traditional way, twisting the wool against her leg.

== Honors ==
The Smithsonian Institution chose her to demonstrate weaving in their Festival of American Folklife in 1984. In 1986, she was awarded the National Endowment for the Arts National Heritage Fellowship. In 1988 Sealaska Heritage Foundation produced a documentary about her life and work. A book, Haa Tuwunáagu Yís, for Healing Our Spirit, edited by Nora and Richard Dauenhauer, which features interviews with Jennie, won the 1991 American Book Award. Her work was featured in many exhibitions, including "Tlingit Aanee" at the Harvard Museum of Natural History.

== Legacy ==
Jennie died from cancer on 16 July 1986 while on an airplane, flying home to Klukwan, Alaska. Of the 11 children she gave birth to, three were still living in 1994.

During the early 20th century, Chilkat blankets were interred in graves, cut into pieces and distributed to mourners, or taken from the community into museums or private collections. Designs became limited, possibly due to a dwindling number of painted pattern boards from which to copy. It fell upon weavers to generate new designs, which became simplified as weavers decreased in numbers. Of these few remaining weavers, Jennie Thlunaut, "the longest-lived member of their fraternity ... , had absorbed sufficient knowledge of the formline tradition ... to keep a large measure of the design structure intact" in her original Chilkat designs.

Jennie tirelessly kept alive a traditional art form during a time when cultural interest in the traditional arts nearly died out, and many young artists of a new generation have learned from Jennie Thlunaut the traditional art of Chilkat weaving. Many of the traditional and cultural arts of the Northwest coastal regions are experiencing a revival, and Jennie Thlunaut has been a seed carrier of knowledge to the younger generations.

"Jennie amazed us with her speed at weaving..." said contemporary Chilkat weaver Clarissa Hudson, "Her fingers seemed to fly through the warp, and she didn't even used a pattern." Biographers Rosita Worl and Charles Smythe wrote, "She will be remembered as one of the most eminent and celebrated weavers of Tlingit ceremonial robes."

== See also ==
- Anna Brown Ehlers, apprentice of Jennie Thlunaut
