= Yeilxaak =

Chief of Klukwan

Yeilxaak, also spelled as Yeilxáak and sometimes known as Ilkhak, was a powerful chief of the Chilkat Tlingit at Klukwan. He is the earliest chief of Klukwan to have encountered Europeans.

== Meetings with Europeans ==
It is not certain when his rule started, but he was both the head of the Gaanaxteidee clan and the chief of all of Klukwan Tlingits by 1788. During this year, during a trading visit at Yakutat, he met the Russian explorers Izmailov and Bocharov. These men recorded his name as Ilkhak.

According to Alejandro Malaspina's Spanish expedition in 1791 and to Tlingit oral histories, Yeilxaak became the rival and enemy of X'unéi. X'unéi, whose name was recorded as Juné by Malaspina's expedition, was a powerful chief of the Yakutat Tlingit and the head of the L'ukwnax.ádi clan. Yeilxaak was killed in 1791 during the long and bloody war between the L'ukwnax.ádi clan of Yakutat and the Gaanaxteidee clan of Klukwan.

== Family ==
In Cora Benson's genealogy, Yeilxaak was the son of K'uxshóo I and Yeidukdatán. His two sisters were Nuwuteiyi and Kaaguneteen. After his death, Yeilxaak was succeeded as the chief of Klukwan first by his nephew Xetsuwu, the son of Nuwuteiyi, and later by his other nephew Shkeedlakáa, the son of Kaaguneteen.
