= Clarissa Rizal =

Native American artist (1956–2016)

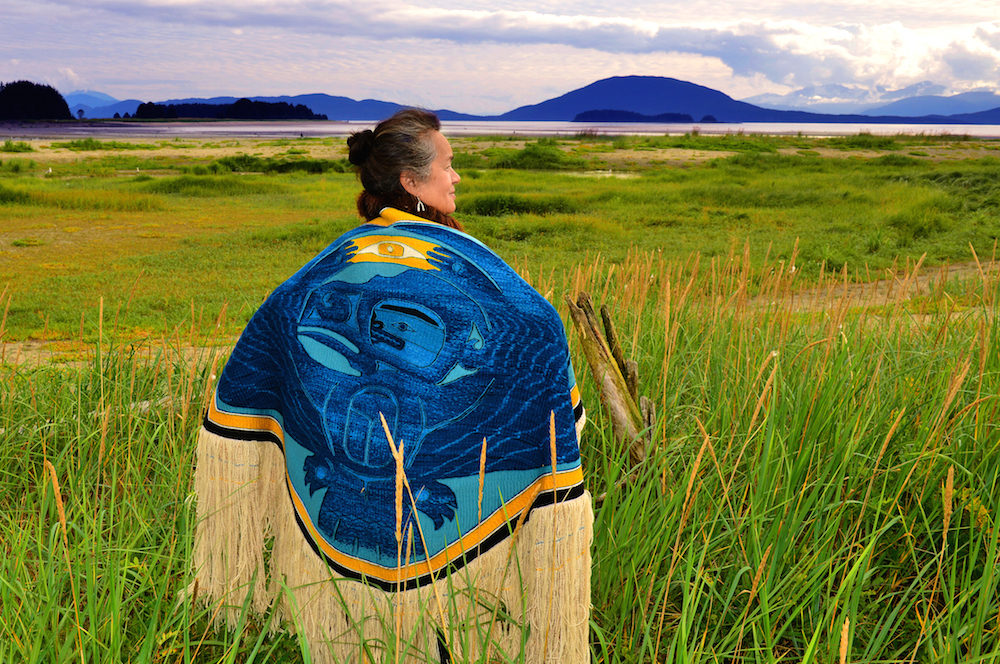
- Rizal in August 2016
- Born: Clarissa Seya Lampe; June 4, 1956; Juneau, Alaska, U.S.
- Died: December 7, 2016 (aged 60); Pagosa Springs, Colorado, U.S.
- Movement: Northwest Coast art
- Children: Lily Hope, Ursala Hudson (Kadusné), Kahlil Hudson
- Awards: National Heritage Fellowship (2016); Honoring Alaska's Indigenous Literature Award (2007–08)
- Website: clarissarizal.com

Clarissa Rizal (June 4, 1956 – December 7, 2016) was a Tlingit artist, visionary, and organizer of Filipino descent. She was best known as a Chilkat and Ravenstail weaver, but she also worked in painting, printmaking, carving, and sculpting. In addition to being a visual artist, she was a musician and wordsmith.

== Personal life ==
Clarissa Seya Lampe was born on June 4, 1956 in Juneau, Alaska. Following the Tlingit tradition of clan membership via matrilineal descent, she was of the T'aḵdeintaan (black-legged kittywake) clan of Hoonah/Glacier Bay through her mother Irene Sarabia Lampe, of the Head House. She produced works for a time using the married name of Clarissa Hudson. She had a son and two daughters who are weavers. The daughters, Lily Hope and Ursala Hudson, weave and teach weaving in Alaska and in other states. Rizal's son, Kahlil Hudson, is a film director and associate professor at the Institute of American Indian Arts (IAIA). Rizal died on December 7, 2016 in Pagosa Springs, Colorado.

== Major works ==
Copper Woman (2002, wool and cedar), a five-piece woven ensemble, demonstrates Rizal's skill in Chilkat and Raven's Tail weaving. Her work demonstrates a spirituality and poetic sensibility; she compared Chilkat weaving as a meditative and spiritual practice akin to Tai chi leading to "new horizons, new ways of thinking, and new ways of being." She also inserted political and historical statements into her woven works. For example, the images in her Resilience weaving document Western colonialism by depicting ships, museums and churches. Juxtaposed next to the images of Western influence are Native logos reflecting cultural integration, resistance, and strength including the Eagle and Raven moieties. Resilience embodies the universal pride of a people who have worked to maintain and reinforce the self-worth, culture and heart which colonialism tried to rob.

Her appliquéd blanket, Spirit of the Music, depicts a kneeling guitarist encircled by seven squatting figures which are linked to one another. It is a reference to Rizal's work as a singer in the Tlingit funk band, Khu.éex'. She produced large scale paintings, illustrated books, and the painted designs on one of the fiberglass horses in The Trail of Painted Ponies, Santa Fe, New Mexico's 2001 public art project.

Her Weavers Across the Waters robe was first worn by canoe carver Wayne Price during the dedication of the Huna Tribal House at Glacier Bay and demonstrated her vision and her ability to organize other weavers. The work was completed by inviting Northwest Coast Chilkat and Raven's Tail weavers to submit 5x5 inch squares, assembled from kits which Rizal created, to be incorporated into the work. The result is a work incorporating a wide array of styles all connecting back to the Tlingit tradition.

== Apprenticeship and writing ==
When in her twenties, Rizal apprenticed under Jennie Thlunaut to learn Chilkat weaving. Thlunaut was in her 90s and met Rizal at a workshop during which Thlunaut grabbed Rizal and said "You are it! Do you hear? You are it!" meaning that Rizal was the one who Thlunaut saw as the true successor to her tradition.

In 2005, Rizal published a book titled Jennie Weaves an Apprentice: A Chilkat Weaver's Handbook. It won a 2007–08 Honoring Alaska's Indigenous Literature Award from the Alaska Native Knowledge Network at the University of Alaska, Fairbanks. Rizal contributed illustrations to the children's book Mary's Wild Winter Feast (2014). She studied under Harry K. Bremner Sr. for song and dance and Selina Peratrovich for basketing.

== Awards and honors ==
Rizal received awards for her artwork. She won a 2013 Artist Fellowship from the Rasmuson Foundation. In 2015, she received a Native Arts and Cultures Foundation National Artist Fellowship. She was a 2011 and 2016 First Peoples Fund Cultural Capital Fellow. Rizal was a recipient of a 2016 National Heritage Fellowship awarded by the National Endowment for the Arts, which is the U.S. government's highest honor in the folk and traditional arts. Her mentor Jennie Thlunaut received the same award in 1986.

Other awards include several Native American Art Markets’ Best of Show: the 1992 & 1994 Lawrence Indian Art Show in Lawrence, Kansas, the 1994 Santa Fe Indian Market in Santa Fe, the 2002 Heard Museum Indian Market in Phoenix, and the 2004 and 2006 Sealaska Juried Art Show in Juneau.

One of the last robes on which Rizal worked was a collaborative effort, Weavers Across the Water. At least fifty weavers either submitted squares or helped Rizal in other ways. The squares were woven together into a single robe. It was first worn by master carver Wayne Price at the dedication of a new Huna tribal house in Glacier Bay. Rizal took the robe to Washington, D.C. for the NEA award event.
