= Chilkat Indian Village =

Alaska Native tribe

Chilkat Indian Village (Klukwan) Jilḵáat Ḵwáan (Tlingit)
- Alaska Native village
- Chilkat Indian Village
- Coordinates: 59°23′56″N 135°53′25″W
- Constitution Ratified: June 18, 1934; 92 years ago
- Capital: Klukwan, Alaska

Government
  - Type: Representative democracy
  - Body: Chilkat Tribal Council
  - President: Kimberly Strong

Population (2006)
  - Estimate: 140
- Demonym: Chilkat Tlingit
- Time zone: UTC– 09:00 (AKST)
  - Summer (DST): UTC– 08:00 (AKDT)
- Website: chilkat-nsn.gov

The Chilkat Indian Village (Klukwan) is a federally recognized Native American tribe in the United States of Chilkat Tlingit people.. This Alaska Native tribe is headquartered in Klukwan, Alaska, with a mailing address in Haines, Alaska.

The Chilkat Indian Village is also known as the Village of Klukwan. Klukwan has been a village preceding colonization. Its name in Tlingit: Tlakw Aan translates as "Eternal Village". It was settled by Raven clan Tlingit men and Eagle clan Tlingit women.

== Government ==
The Chilkat Indian Village is led by a democratically elected tribal council. Their president is Kimberly Strong. The Alaska Regional Office of the Bureau of Indian Affairs serves the tribe.

The Chilkat Indian Village first ratified their constitution and by-laws in 1934. They ratified a new constitution in 2006. They are served by the Alaska Regional Office of the Bureau of Indian Affairs.

== Enrollment ==
The tribe determines citizenship from its 1940 base roll. All lineal descendants from people listed on the 1940 may enroll. Those who do not live in the village can enroll as a at-large members who do not have nominating or voting privileges and cannot run for office.

In 2006, they had 140 enrolled citizens.

== Language ==
The tribe speaks English and the Chilkat dialect of the Tlingit language.

== Arts and culture ==
Chilkat Tlingit are known for Chilkat weaving and formline design. In 2016, the tribe opened the Jilkaat Kwaan Cultural Center.

== Notable Chilkat Tlingit people ==
- Lani Hotch (born 1956), basket maker, Chilkat weaver, Ravenstail weaver
- Yeilxáak, 18th-century chief
