= Lisa Telford =

Git'ans Git'anee Haida weaver

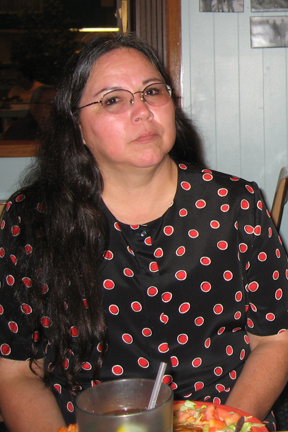
- Born: Ketchikan, Alaska
- Style: Northwest Coast style weaving techniques

Lisa Telford (born in Ketchikan, Alaska) is a Git'ans Git'anee Haida weaver who creates contemporary garments, shoes and other objects using Northwest Coast style weaving techniques. Her work serves as a commentary on Native identity, stereotypes and fashion.

Her baskets may be seen in the collections of The Oregon Historical Society, Hallie Ford Museum of Art, the Smithsonian National Museum of the American Indian, the Heard Museum, the Portland Art Museum, the Burke Museum and at Stonington Gallery.

== Training ==
Telford comes from a long line of weavers including her grandmother, mother, aunt and cousins. Despite her Indiana upbringing, she grew up connected to her culture, visiting Alaska for traditional gatherings and potlatches and participating in traditional dance.

For 16 years Telford worked as a carpenter. In 1996, she took a position as a job developer with a nonprofit organization called ANEW — Apprenticeship and Nontraditional Employment for Women and Men.

At the age of 35, she began learning to weave traditional Haida baskets from her aunt, Delores Churchill, and traditional cedar garments from her cousin, Holly Churchill.

== Creative process ==
Telford stuck strictly to the tradition of form follows function until 2004 when she went into contemporary cedar clothing, cedar shoes, cowboy boots and neckties.

Telford tells of her work:

I harvest and prepare my own material, using red & yellow cedar bark and spruce root in my work. Harvesting cedar bark takes me hundreds of miles from home and many hours of preparation time. Materials are prepared differently depending on the final product. The bark is traditionally stored for one year and then further processing is required before weaving may start.

After that, baskets can take Telford five to 200 hours to make.

As a young weaver she once sat down and counted every stitch on one of her grandmother's old baskets. "At first my basketry had to be perfect, and then I let it all go and that's when I found true joy". The artist compares making baskets to therapy, saying it helps her relax from the stresses of life. She also called basketry her thread to sanity.

== Collaborations ==
In 2011, Telford worked with glass artist Preston Singletary on an exhibition of women's forms in glass.

In 2011, Telford received in the National Native Artist Exchange Grant to work with Kelly Church. She taught Kelly how to find and choose the proper cedar tree for harvesting, how to split and prepare the bark to be stored.

== Exhibitions ==
Hearts of Our People: Native Women Artists, June 2019 -September 2020, organized by the Minneapolis Institute of Art, Minneapolis, MN

== Grants, honors, and awards ==
- 1998 - demonstrator at the Suquamish Museum and the Seattle Art Museum
- 1998 - instructor at the Sealaska Heritage Foundation
- 1998 - instructor at the Kootznoowoo Cultural Foundation
- 1999 - artist in residence at Eitejorg Museum in Indianapolis
- 1999 - artist in residence at the National Museum of the American Indian/Smithsonian Institution
- 1999 - artist in residence at the ATLATL in New York
- 2006 - visiting-researcher at the Burke Museum's Bill Holm Center for the Study of Northwest Coast Art
- 2011 - received an Artistic Innovation grant from the Native Arts and Cultures Foundation
- 2011 - her work was chosen selected as the catalog cover image for "Time Warp: Contemporary Textiles of the Northwest Coast," at the Bill Reid Gallery of Northwest Coast Art
- 2012 - won first place at the 53rd annual Indian Fair & Market at the Heard Museum
