= Lisa Hageman Yahgulanaas =

Haida weaver

- Kuuyas 7waahlal Gidaak
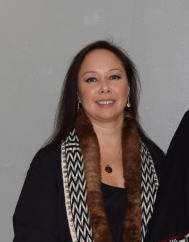
- Lisa Hageman Yahgulanaas in 2016
- Occupation: Weaver
- Website: ravenweaver.com

Lisa Hageman Yahgulanaas (also Kuuyas 7waahlal Gidaak, lit. 'Precious Potlatch Woman') is a Haida weaver. She is from Haida Gwaii and is based in Masset. She has won multiple awards in British Columbia.

== Weaving style ==
Yahgulanaas specializes in Yelth Koo (Raven's Tail), a traditional geometric weaving style. In 2014, ARTnews reported that textiles and regalia woven by her "have a distinctively modernist edge."

== Recognition ==
In 2010, Yahgulanaas was one of six First Nations artists to receive the BC Creative Achievement Award for First Nations Art, awarded in recognition of an artist's entire body of work. She credited the award to the Hageman-7idansuu Robe, a robe she created in 2009 which was the first Haida robe in more than 150 years to use only the Z-twist technique.

In 2016, when visiting Haida Gwaii, Prince William, Duke of Cambridge and Catherine, Duchess of Cambridge wore scarves woven by Yahgulanaas.

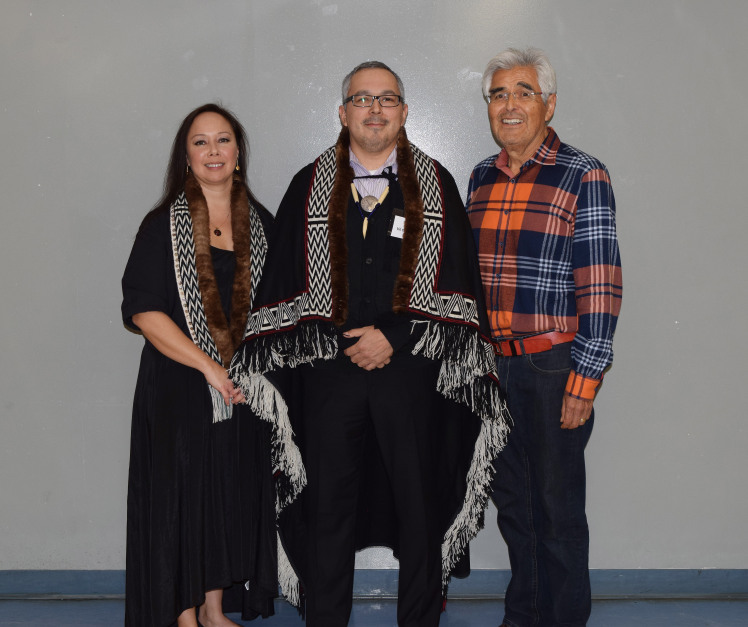
From left: Yahgulanaas with then-President of the Haida Nation Peter Lantin and carver Robert Davidson, photographed in 2016

Also in 2010, Yahgulanaas received an award of excellence from the World Art Market at the Museum of Anthropology at UBC for her Woven Sea Robe, which combined the traditional Raven's Tail weaving technique with modern button blanket and appliqué styles.

From July 23 to October 4, 2020, Yahgulanaas' robe Raining Gold was featured in Àbadakone (Continuous Fire), an exhibition of indigenous art at the National Gallery of Canada.

In 2021, Yahgulanaas was commissioned by the National Gallery of Canada to weave a chief's robe, a dance apron, and leggings as part of its Re-Creation project.

== Personal life ==
A member of the Yahgulanaas clan within the Dadens Raven moiety of the Haida, Yahgulanaas is descended from a family of Haida weavers.
