= Chilkat weaving =

Northwest Coast weaving style

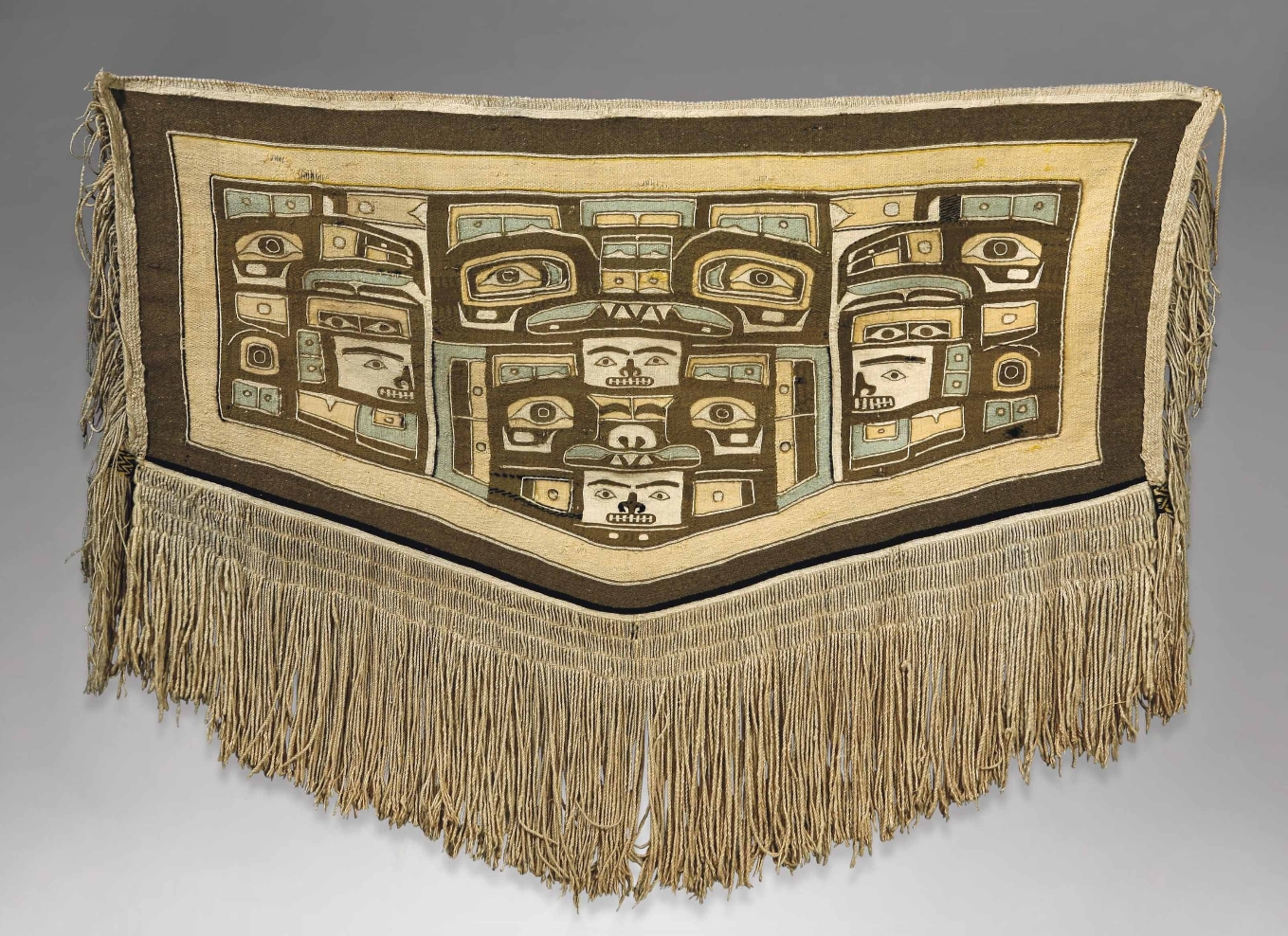
Chilkat blanket attributed to Mary Ebbetts Hunt (Anisalaga), 1823-1919, Fort Rupert, British Columbia. Height: 117 cm. (46 in.)

Chilkat weaving is a traditional form of weaving practiced by Tlingit, Haida, Tsimshian, and other Northwest Coast peoples of Alaska and British Columbia. Chilkat robes (Tlingit: Naaxein) are worn by high-ranking tribal members on civic or ceremonial occasions, including dances. The blankets are almost always black, white, yellow and blue.

== Background ==
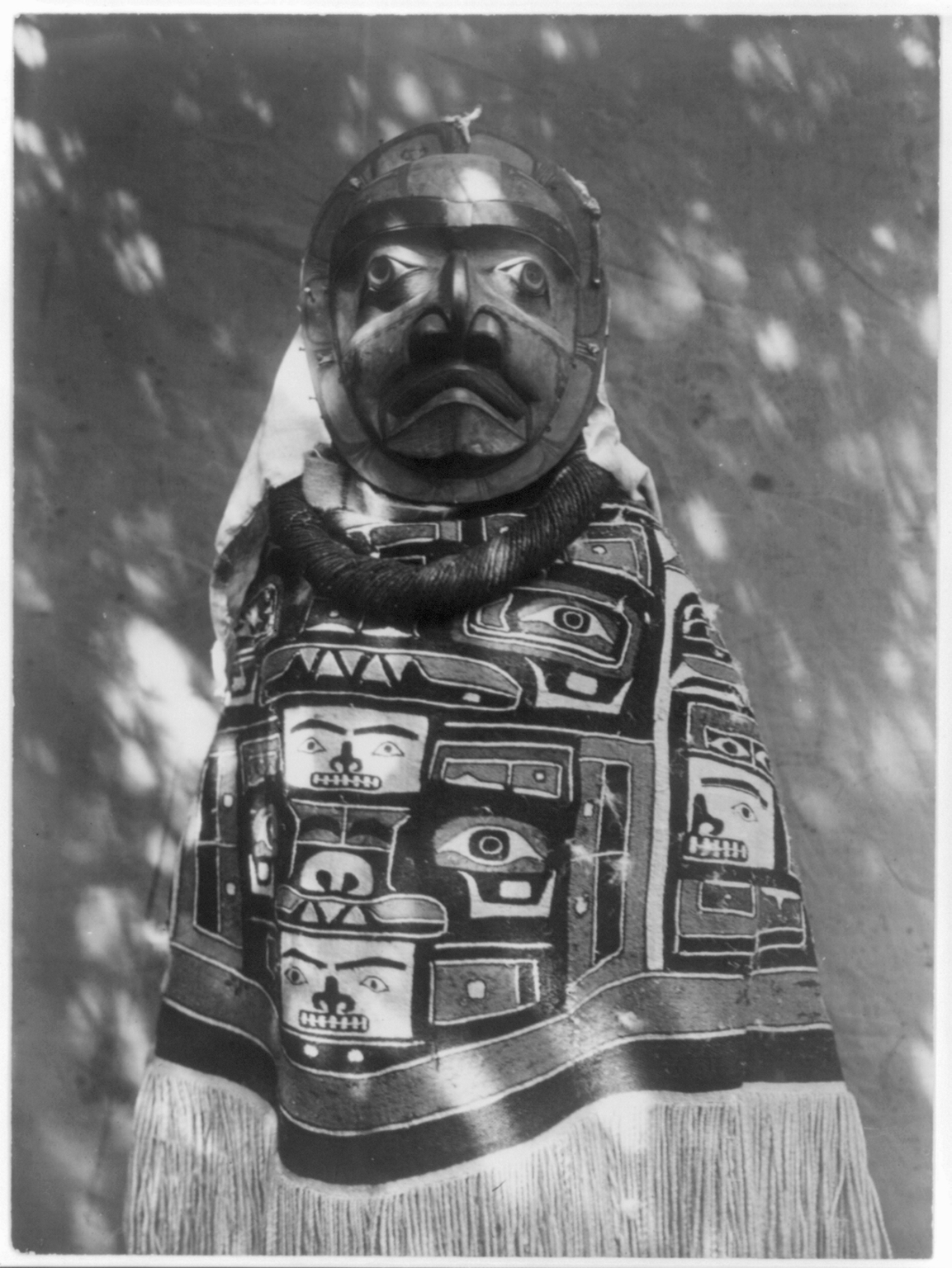
Kwagu'ł woman wearing the same fringed Chilkat blanket by Mary Ebbetts Hunt shown above (worn backwards), a hamatsa neckring and mask

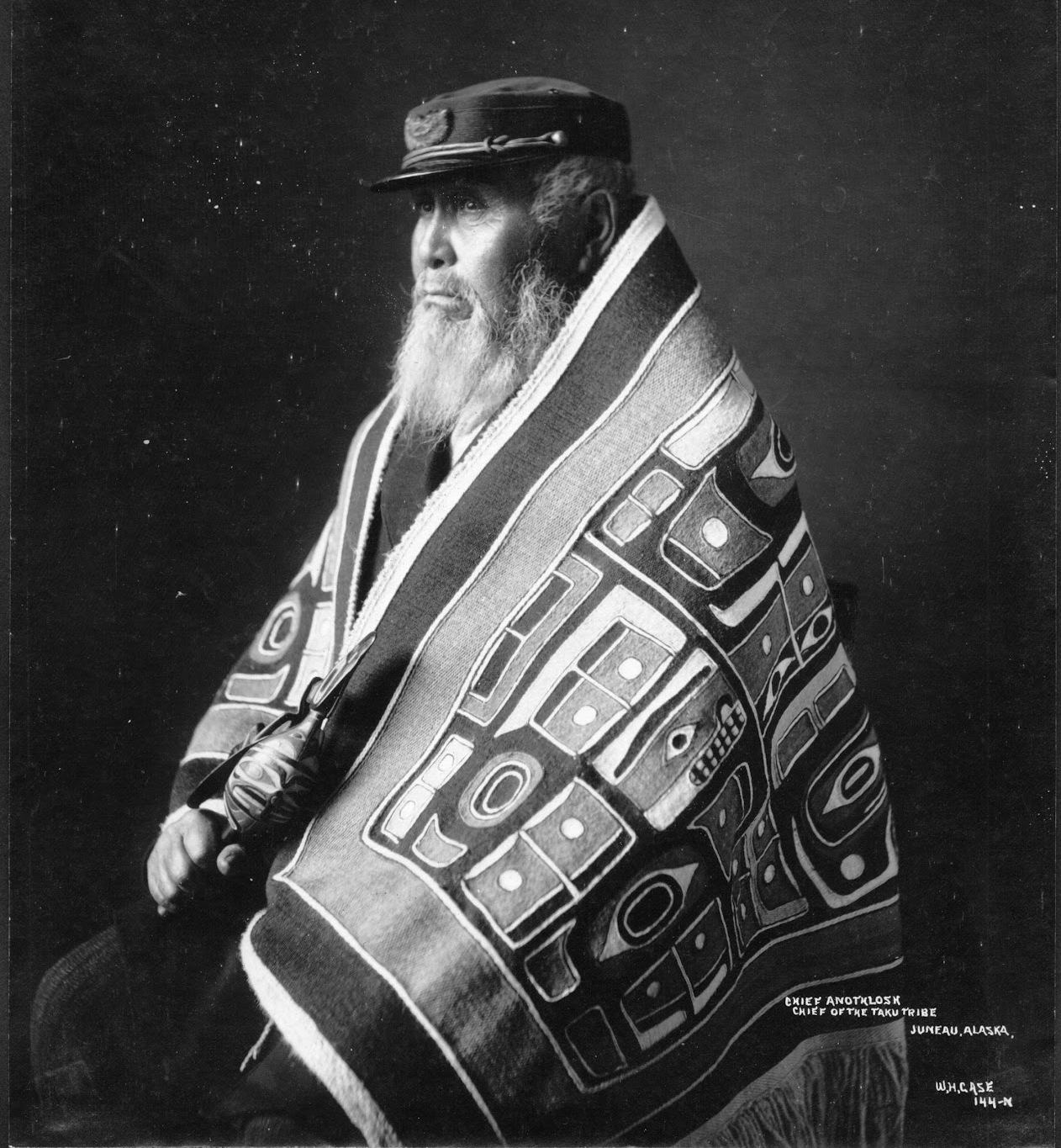
Chief Anotklosh (Taku) wearing a Chilkat blanket, Juneau, Alaska, c. 1913

The name derives from the Tlingit people of the Chilkat (Jilkháat) region near Klukwan, Alaska on the Chilkat River. The Nisga'a are reputed to have invented the technique, according to some Tlingit weavers, though this is not attested in Tsimshian sources. Chilkat weaving can be applied to blankets, robes, dance tunics, aprons, leggings, shirts, vests, bags, hats, and wall-hangings. Chilkat clothing features long wool fringe that sways when the wearer dances. Traditionally, chiefs would wear Chilkat robes during potlatch ceremonies.

Chilkat weaving is one of the most complex weaving techniques in the world. It is unique in that the artist can create curvilinear and circular forms within the weave itself. A Chilkat robe can take a year to weave. Traditionally mountain goat wool, dog fur, and yellow cedar bark are used in Chilkat weaving. Today sheep wool might be used. The designs used Northwest Coast formlines, a traditional aesthetic language made up of ovoid, U-form, and S-form elements to create highly stylized, but representational, clan crests and figures from oral history—often animals and especially their facial features. Yellow and black are dominant colors in the weavings, as is the natural buff color of the undyed wool. Blue can be a secondary color. Traditionally, yellow dye could be derived from wolf moss, which also acted as a deterrent to moths, while black dye came from a combination of Western hemlock, iron, and copper. By the late 1800s to early 1900s, many weavers used synthetically dyed yarns solely or in combination with the naturally dyed yarns.

Looms used in Chilkat weaving only have a top frame and vertical supports, with no bottom frame, so the warp threads hang freely. The weaver works in vertical sections, as opposed to moving horizontally from end to end. Consequently, many designs are broken into vertical columns. As with most Northwest Coast art, these columns are bilaterally symmetrical.

== Revival ==
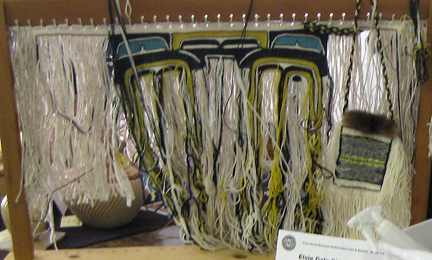
Beginning of a Chilkat apron, woven by Elsie Gale Stewart-Burton (Haida), Ketchikan, Alaska

In the 1990s, only an estimated six people still practiced true Chilkat weaving, but today the technique is enjoying a revival. Kaagwaantaan Clan, Ghooch Hít woman Jennie Thlunaut (1891–1986) was a celebrated Chilkat weaver, whose knowledge of formline design was so thorough, she was able to create her own designs following the traditional rules. Thlunaut trained Ghaanaxhteidí Clan woman Anna Brown Ehlers and T’akhdeintaan Clan woman Clarissa Rizal. Rizal and others worked to train a new generation of weavers, and since that time more individuals have begun weaving in the Tlingit, Haida, and Tsimshian communities.

As of 2022, an estimated twelve living people had woven a Chilkat robe.

These tribes also create Ravenstail weavings and button blankets.

== See also ==
- Lily Hope
- Ursala Hudson
- Northwest Coast art
- Native American art
