= Ravenstail weaving =

Pacific Northwest Coast form of weaving

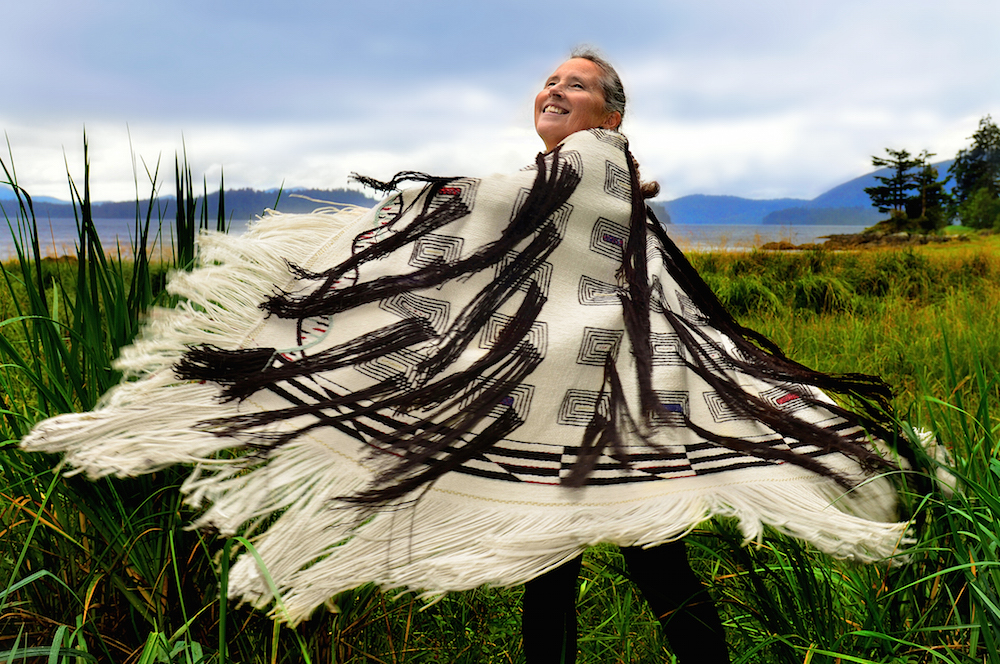
Weaver Teri Rofkar with a Ravenstail ceremonial blanket robe she wove.

Ravenstail weaving (yéil koowú), also known as Raven's Tail weaving, is a traditional form of geometric weaving-style practiced by Northwest Coast peoples.

== History ==
The practice of Ravenstail and Chilkat weaving originated among the Tsimshian, and was retained by traditional Tlingit and Haida weavers in present-day Alaska and British Columbia. Ravenstail weaving is thought to be a precursor to Chilkat weaving. Ravenstail weaving has sharp, geometric lines and minimal colors; while Chilkat weaving visually looks more natural with curved lines and a larger color palette.

Ravenstail uses a finger-weaving technique called 'twining'. Typically, for Ravenstail pieces, it is created in modern times using black and white (and sometimes yellow) colored merino sheep-wool (sometimes with the traditional slender strands of animal sinew or, a more modern substitute, small amounts of silk) or, when legally available and affordable to the weaver, the original traditional fiber, yarn made from wild mountain goat (Oreamnos americanus) wool, to create bold geometric woven patterns. The early examples, ones made before first contact with foreign explorers and traders who introduced sheep's wool to the continent, were constructed from mountain goat-wool yarn. There are not many surviving historical examples, with roughly a dozen Ravenstail robes in North American and European museums.

== Revival ==
After the 1800s, Ravenstail died out of popularity and due to the rise of new weaving innovations and techniques. The Ravenstail weaving technique almost went extinct after 200 years of inactivity.

Cheryl Samuel was the first person to replicate Ravenstail weaving for revival purposes, and by the mid-1980s she had obtained permission from several Pacific Northwest indigenous tribes to revive the art to regularly teach classes on the subject. In 1987, Samuel published a book The Raven's Tail: Northern Geometric Style Weaving (University of British Columbia Press). In the 1990s additional research was done to bring back the traditional craft; and museums and cultural centers in the Alaskan cities of Juneau, Ketchikan, and Sitka struggled together to revive the craft by working with both Natives and non-Natives. In November 1990, a Ravenstail Weaver's Guild was formed in Ketchikan through the Totem Heritage Center, and served to strengthen craft community between Native and non-Natives in the United States and Canada.

In 2021 the exhibition The Spirit Wraps Around You: Northern Northwest Coast Native Textiles, was held at the Alaska State Museum and included Ravenstail weaving while highlighted the oldest known weavings from Indigenous peoples of the Pacific Northwest Coast.

== Notable weavers ==
- Delores Churchill (Haida)
- Lily Hope (Tlingit)
- Lani Hotch (Tlingit)
- Marie Oldfield (Tsimshian)
- Clarissa Rizal (Tlingit)
- Teri Rofkar (Tlingit)
- Cheryl Samuel (non-Native), the first person to replicate the technique during the revival period.
- Ann Smith (Tlingit/Tutchone)
- Evelyn Vanderhoop (Haida)
- aay aay gidins (Haida)

== See also ==
- Button blankets
