= Tlingit =

Indigenous people of the Pacific Northwest Coast of North America

Lingít
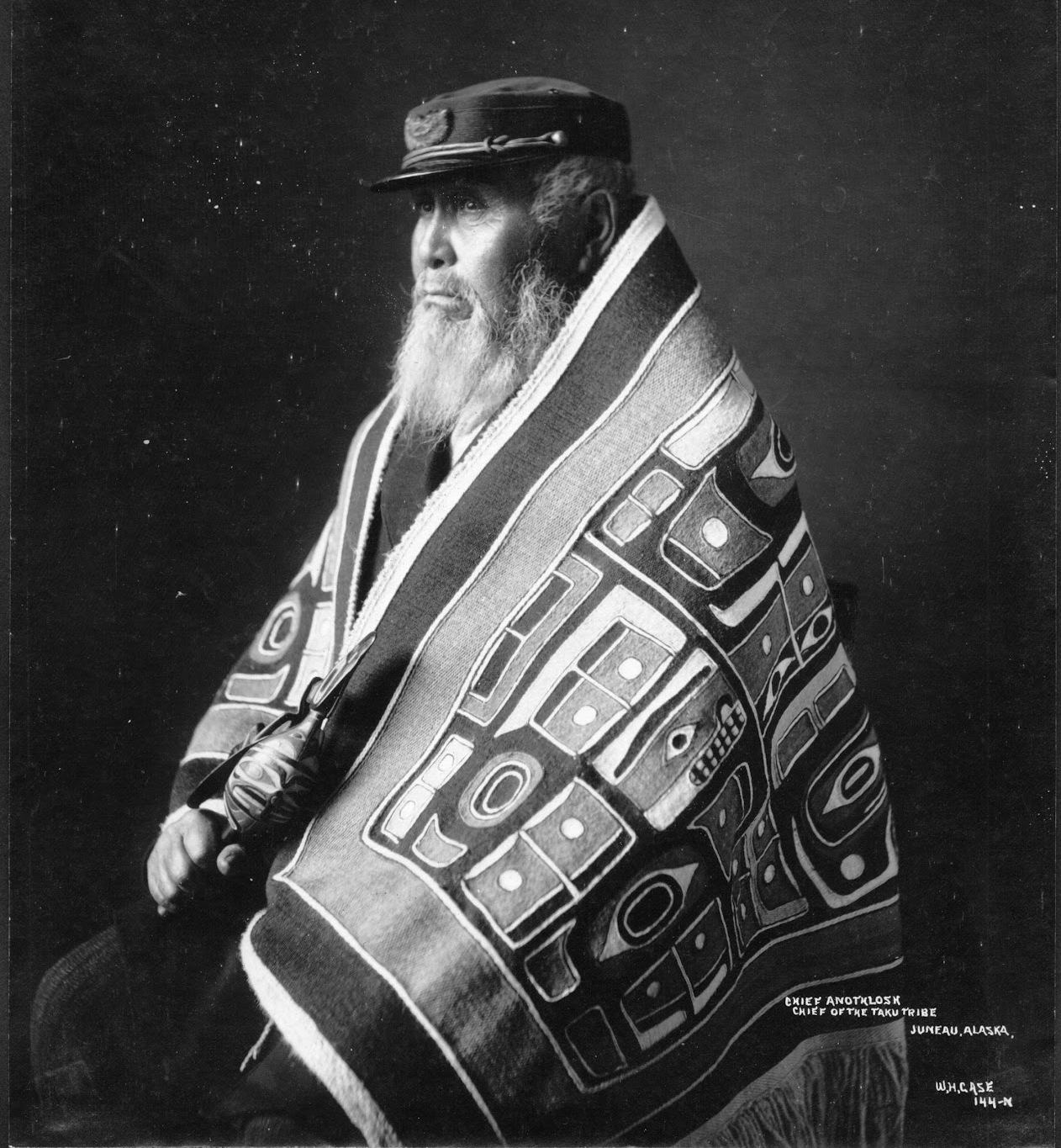
- Chief Anotklosh of the Taku Tribe, wearing a Chilkat blanket, Juneau, Alaska, c. 1913

Regions with significant populations
- United States (Alaska): 22,601 (2020)
- Canada (British Columbia, Yukon): 2,110

Languages
- English, Tlingit, Russian (historically)

Religion
- Christianity, esp. Russian Orthodox; Traditional Alaska Native religion

Lingít "People of the Tides"
- Person: Lingít
- People: Lingít
- Language: Lingít (Lingít x̱ʼéinax̱)
- Country: Lingít Aaní

The Tlingit or Lingít (/ˈklɪŋkɪt, ˈtlɪŋkɪt/ KLING-kit, TLING-kit) are an Indigenous people of the Pacific Northwest Coast of North America. Tlingit people are Alaska Natives and First Nations in Canada. They speak the Tlingit language, a Na-Dene language.

The Tlingit have a matrilineal kinship system, with children born into the mother's clan, and property and hereditary roles passing through the mother's line. Their culture and society developed in the temperate rainforest of the southeast Alaskan coast and the Alexander Archipelago. The Tlingit have maintained a complex hunter-gatherer culture based on semi-sedentary management of fisheries. Hereditary slavery was practiced extensively until it was outlawed by the United States Government. The Inland Tlingit live in the far northwestern part of the province of British Columbia and the southern Yukon in Canada. Taku Tlingit live in British Columbia and Alaska.

== Name ==
Their autonym Lingít means 'People of the Tides'. The Russian name Koloshi (Колоши, from a Sugpiaq-Alutiiq term kulut'ruaq for the labret worn by women) or the related German name Koulischen may be encountered referring to the people in older historical literature, such as Grigory Shelikhov's 1796 map of Russian America.

== Contemporary nations ==
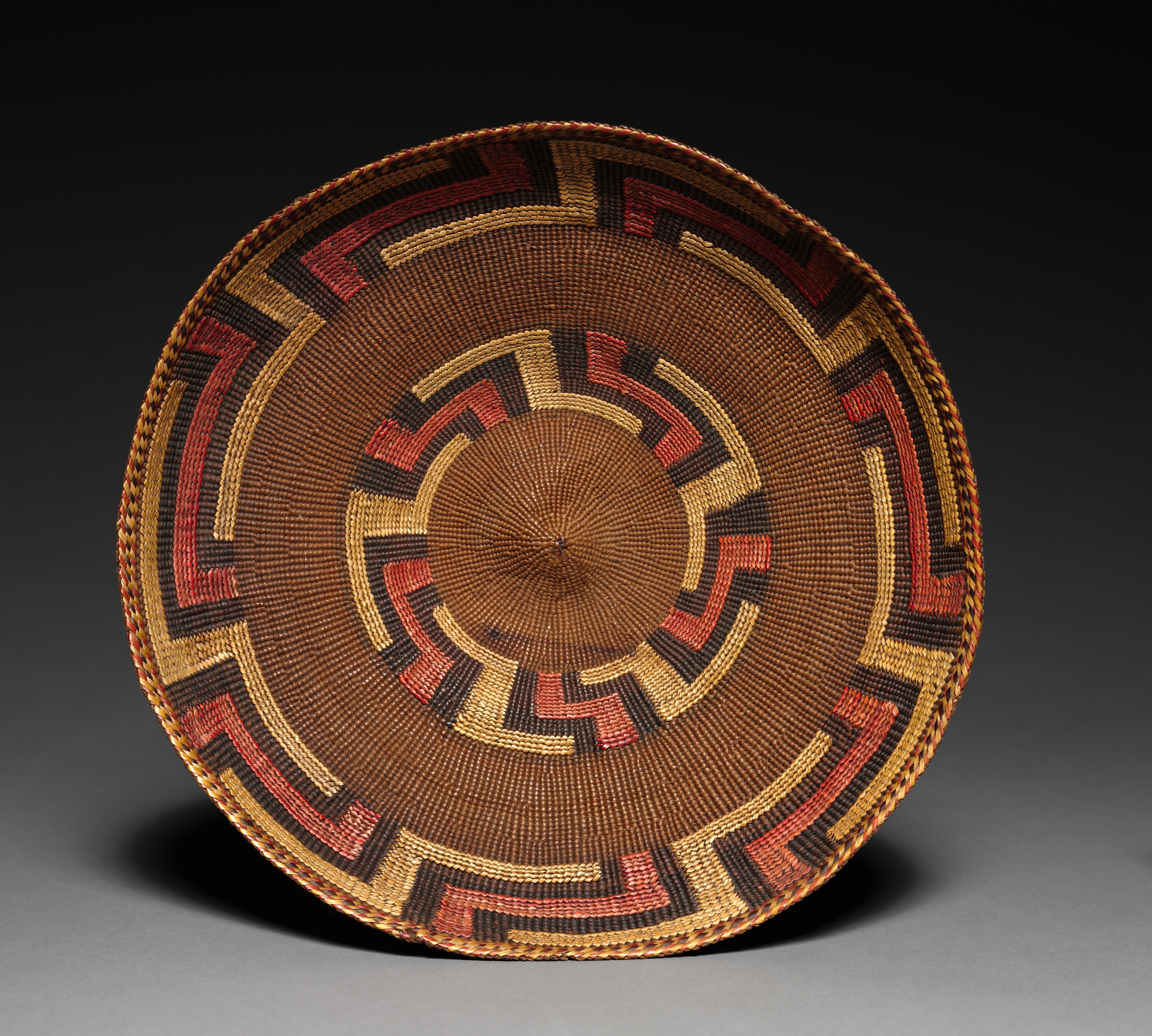
Tlingit twined basket tray, late 19th c., spruce root, sea lyme-grass, pigment, Cleveland Museum of Art

Federally recognized tribes of Tlingit people in the United States are in Alaska and include:

- Angoon Community Association
- Central Council of the Tlingit & Haida Indian Tribes
- Chilkat Indian Village (Klukwan)
- Chilkoot Indian Association (Haines)
- Craig Tribal Association
- Douglas Indian Association
- Hoonah Indian Association
- Ketchikan Indian Community
- Klawock Cooperative Association
- Organized Village of Kake
- Organized Village of Saxman
- Petersburg Indian Association
- Sitka Tribe of Alaska
- Skagway Village
- Wrangell Cooperative Association
- Yakutat Tlingit Tribe

Sealaska Corporation is an Alaska Native Regional Corporation that includes Tlingit people. Within Sealaska are smaller regional corporations.

First Nations in Canada of Tlingit people are in British Columbia and Yukon and include:

- Carcross/Tagish First Nation, Yukon
- Taku River Tlingit First Nation, British Columbia
- Teslin Tlingit Council, Yukon

== Territory ==
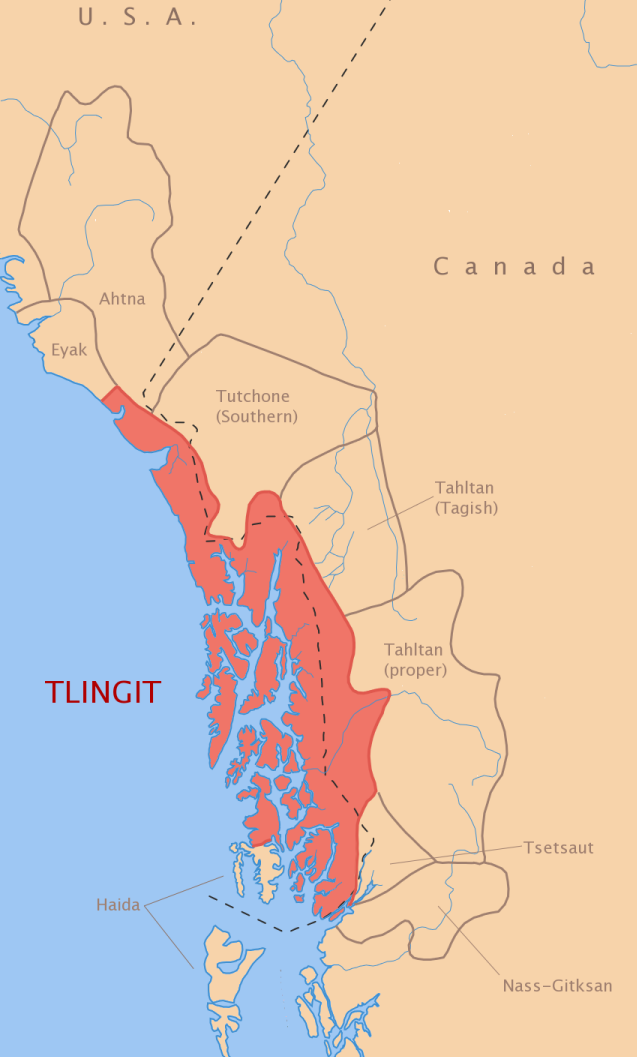
Tlingit and neighboring peoples

The greatest territory historically occupied by the Tlingit extended from the Portland Canal along the present border between Alaska and British Columbia, north to the coast just southeast of the Copper River delta in Alaska. The Tlingit occupied almost all of the Alexander Archipelago, except the southernmost end of Prince of Wales Island and its surroundings, where the Kaigani Haida moved just before the first encounters with European explorers.

The Coastal Tlingit tribes controlled one of the mountain passes into the Yukon interior; they were divided into three tribes: the Chilkat Tlingit (Jilḵáat Ḵwáan) along the Chilkat River and on Chilkat Peninsula, the Chilkoot Tlingit (Jilḵoot Ḵwáan) and the Taku Tlingit (Tʼaaḵu Ḵwáan) along the Taku River.

Inland, the Tlingit occupied areas along the major rivers that pierce the Coast Mountains and Saint Elias Mountains and flow into the Pacific, including the Alsek, Tatshenshini, Chilkat, Taku, and Stikine rivers. With regular travel up these rivers, the Tlingit developed extensive trade networks with Athabascan tribes of the interior, and commonly intermarried with them. From this regular travel and trade, a few relatively large populations of Tlingit settled around Atlin, Teslin, and Tagish Lakes, whose headwaters flow from areas near the headwaters of the Taku River.

Delineating the current territory of the Tlingit is complicated because they live in both Canada and the United States, they lack designated reservations, other complex legal and political concerns make the situation confusing, and their population is highly mobile. They also share territory with Athabascan peoples such as the Tahltan, Kaska, and Tagish. In Canada, the Interior Tlingit communities, such as Atlin, British Columbia (Taku River Tlingit), Teslin, Yukon (Teslin Tlingit Council), and Carcross, Yukon (Carcross/Tagish First Nation) have reserves.

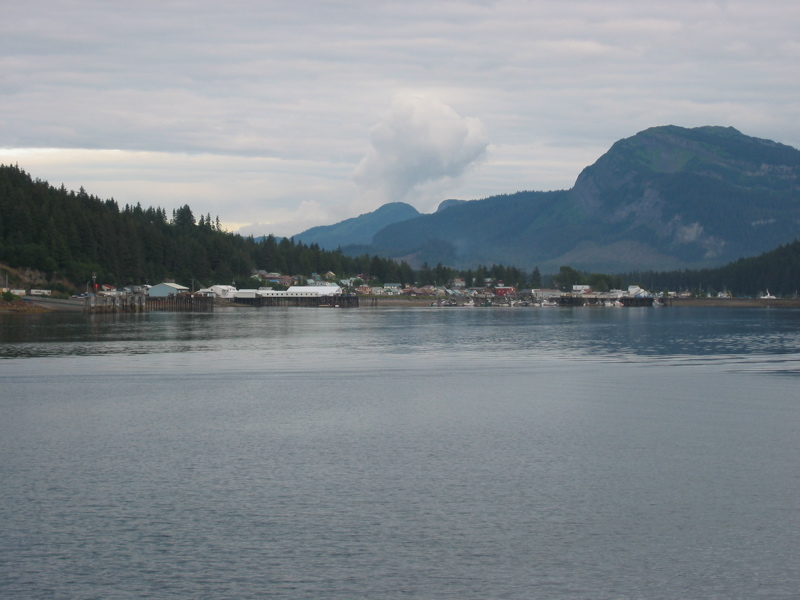
Hoonah, Alaska, a traditional Tlingit village near Glacier Bay, home of the Xúnaa Ḵáawu

Tlingits in Alaska lack Indian reservations because the Alaska Native Claims Settlement Act (ANCSA) established regional corporations throughout Alaska with complex portfolios of land ownership rather than bounded reservations administered by Tribal Governments. The corporation in the Tlingit region is Sealaska Corporation, which serves the Tlingit, Haida, and Tsimshian in Alaska.

Tlingit people participate in the commercial economy of Alaska, and typically live in privately owned housing and land. Many also possess land allotments from Sealaska or from earlier distributions predating ANCSA. Their current residences are within their historical homelands. Land around Yakutat, south through the Alaskan Panhandle, to the lakes in interior Yukon, as being Lingít Aaní, the Land of the Tlingit.

The extant Tlingit territory can be roughly divided into four major sections, paralleling ecological, linguistic, and cultural divisions:

- Southern Tlingit, south of Frederick Sound, who live in the northernmost reaches of the Western Red cedar forest.
- Northern Tlingit, north of Frederick Sound to Cape Spencer, Glacier Bay, and Lynn Canal; they occupy the warmest and richest of the Sitka Spruce and Western Hemlock forests.
- Inland Tlingit along large interior lakes, the Taku River drainage, and southern Yukon, whose share a subsistence lifeway similar to Athabascans in the mixed spruce taiga.
- Gulf Coast Tlingit, who live along a narrow strip of coastline backed by steep mountains and extensive glaciers north of Cape Spencer and along the coast of the Gulf of Alaska to Controller Bay and Kayak Island. Pacific storms hit their territory.

These categories reflect differences in cultures, food harvesting, and dialects. Tlingit groups trade among themselves with neighboring communities. These academic classifications are supported by similar self-identification among the Tlingit.

=== Tribes or ḵwáans ===
Tlingit tribe	IPA	Translation	Village or Community location	Anglicized, archaic variants or adaptations
G̱alyáx̱ Ḵwáan	[qaɬjáχ qʰʷáːn]	Salmon Stream Tribe	Yakataga-Controller Bay area	Kaliakh
Xunaa Ḵáawu	[χʊnaː kʰáːwʊ]	Tribe or People from the Direction of the North Wind	Hoonah	Hoonah people
Sʼawdáan Ḵwáan	[sʼawdáːn qʰʷáːn]	From Sʼoow ('jade') daa (around), aan (land/country/village) because the bay is the color of jade all around	Sedum	Sumdum
Tʼaḵjik.aan Ḵwáan	[tʼaqtʃikʔaːn qʰʷáːn]	Coast Town Tribe	northern Prince of Wales Island	Tuxekan
Laax̱aayík Kwáan	[ɬaːχaːjík qʰʷáːn]	Inside the Glacier People	Yakutat area	Yakutat
Tʼaaḵu Ḵwáan	[tʼaːqʰu qʰʷáːn]	Geese Flood Upriver Tribe	Taku	Taku Tlingit, Taku people
Xutsnoowú (a.k.a. Xudzidaa) Ḵwáan	[xutsnuːwú qʰʷáːn]	Brown Bear Fort a.k.a. Burnt Wood Tribe	Angoon	Hootchenoo people, Hoochenoo, Kootznahoo
Hinyaa Ḵwáan	[hinjaː qʰʷáːn]	Tribe From Across The Water	Klawock	Henya, Hanega
G̱unaax̱oo Ḵwáan	[qunaːχuː qʰʷáːn]	Among The Athabascans Tribe	Dry Bay	Gunahoo people, Dry Bay people
Deisleen Ḵwáan	[tesɬiːn qʰʷáːn]	Big Sinew Tribe	Teslin	Teslin Tlingit, Teslin people, Inland Tlinkit
Sheetʼká Ḵwáan (also Shee Tʼiká)	[ʃiːtʼkʰá qʰʷáːn]	Outside Edge of a Branch Tribe	Sitka	Sitka, Shee Atika
Shtaxʼhéen Ḵwáan	[ʃtaxʼhíːn qʰʷáːn]	Bitter Water Tribe	Wrangell	Stikine people, Stikine Tlingit
Séet Ká Ḵwáan	[séːtʰ kʰʌ́ qʰʷáːn]	People of the Fast Moving Water	Petersburg	Séet Ká Ḵwáan
Jilḵáat Ḵwáan	[tʃiɬqʰáːt qʰʷáːn]	From Chaal ('food cache') x̱aat ('salmon') ḵwaan ('dwellers'): Salmon Cache Tribe	Klukwan	Chilkat people
Áa Tlein Ḵwáan	[ʔáː tɬʰeːn qʰʷáːn]	Big Lake Tribe	Atlin	Taku River Tlingit, Inland Tlingit
Ḵéex̱ʼ Kwáan	[qʰíːχʼ qʰʷáːn]	Dawn Tribe	Kake	Kake people
Taantʼa Ḵwáan	[tʰaːntʼa qʰʷáːn]	Sea Lion Tribe	Fort Tongass (formerly) & Ketchikan (today)	Tongass people
Jilḵoot Ḵwáan	[tʃiɬqʰuːt qʰʷáːn]	Chilkoot Tribe	Haines	Chilkoot people
Áakʼw Ḵwáan	[ʔáːkʷʼ qʰʷáːn]	Small Lake Tribe	Auke Bay	Auke people
Kooyu Ḵwáan	[kʰuːju qʰʷáːn]	Stomach Tribe	Kuiu Island	Kuiu people
Saanyaa Ḵwáan	[saːnjaː qʰʷáːn]	Southward Tribe	Cape Fox Village (formerly) & Saxman (today)	Saanya Kwaan, owns Saxman Corporation, which owns Cape Fox Corporation

== Culture ==
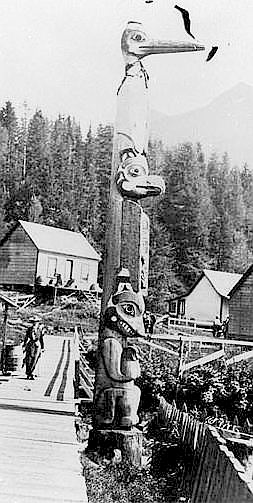
A Tlingit totem pole in Ketchikan c. 1901

The Tlingit culture is multifaceted and complex, a characteristic of Northwest Pacific Coast people with access to easily exploited rich resources. In Tlingit culture a heavy emphasis is placed upon family and kinship, and on a rich oratory tradition. Wealth and economic power are important indicators of rank, but so is generosity and proper behavior, all signs of "good breeding" and ties to aristocracy. Art and spirituality are incorporated in nearly all areas of Tlingit culture, with even everyday objects such as spoons and storage boxes decorated and imbued with spiritual power and historical beliefs of the Tlingits.

Tlingit society is divided into two moieties, the Raven and the Eagle. These in turn are divided into numerous clans, which are subdivided into lineages or house groups. They have a matrilineal kinship system, with descent and inheritance passed through the mother's line. These groups have heraldic crests, which are displayed on totem poles, canoes, feast dishes, house posts, weavings, jewelry, and other art forms. The Tlingits pass down at.oow(s) or blankets that represented trust. Only a Tlingit can inherit one but they can also pass it down to someone they trust, who becomes responsible for caring for it but does not rightfully own it.

Like other Northwest Coast native peoples, the Tlingit did practice hereditary slavery.

== Philosophy and religion ==
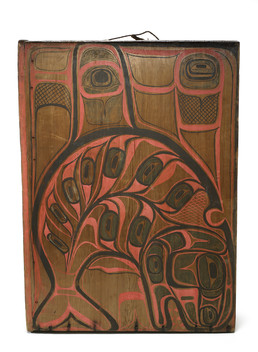
Kóok gaaw, box drum, late 19th century. Image is of a sea wolf (orca).

Tlingit thought and belief, although never formally codified, was historically a fairly well organized philosophical and religious system whose basic axioms shaped the way Tlingit people viewed and interacted with the world around them. Tlingits were traditionally animists, and hunters ritually purified themselves before hunting animals. Shamans, primarily men, cured diseases, influenced weather, aided in hunting, predicted the future, and protected people against witchcraft. A central tenet of the Tlingit belief system is the reincarnation of both humans and animals.

Between 1886 and 1895, in the face of their shamans' inability to treat Old World diseases including smallpox, many Tlingit people converted to Orthodox Christianity. Russian Orthodox missionaries had translated their liturgy into the Tlingit language. It has been argued that they saw Eastern Orthodox Christianity as a way of resisting assimilation to the "American way of life", which was associated with Presbyterianism. After the introduction of Christianity, the Tlingit belief system began to erode.

Today, some young Tlingits look back towards their traditional tribal religions and worldview for inspiration, security, and a sense of identity. While many elders converted to Christianity, contemporary Tlingit "reconcile Christianity and the 'traditional culture.'"

== Language ==
Two Tlingit speakers, recorded in the United States.

The Tlingit people of Southeast Alaska and Western Canada speak the Tlingit language (Lingít [ɬɪ̀nkít]), which forms an independent branch of the Na-Dené language family. Tlingit has a complex grammar and sound system and also uses several rare phonemes.

Tlingit has an estimated 200 to 400 native speakers in the United States and 100 speakers in Canada. The speakers are all bilingual or near-bilingual in English. Tribes, institutions, and linguists are expending extensive effort into revitalization programs in Southeast Alaska to revive and preserve the Tlingit language and its culture. Sealaska Heritage Institute, Goldbelt Heritage Institute and the University of Alaska Southeast have Tlingit language programs, and community classes are held in Klukwan and Angoon.

== Housing ==
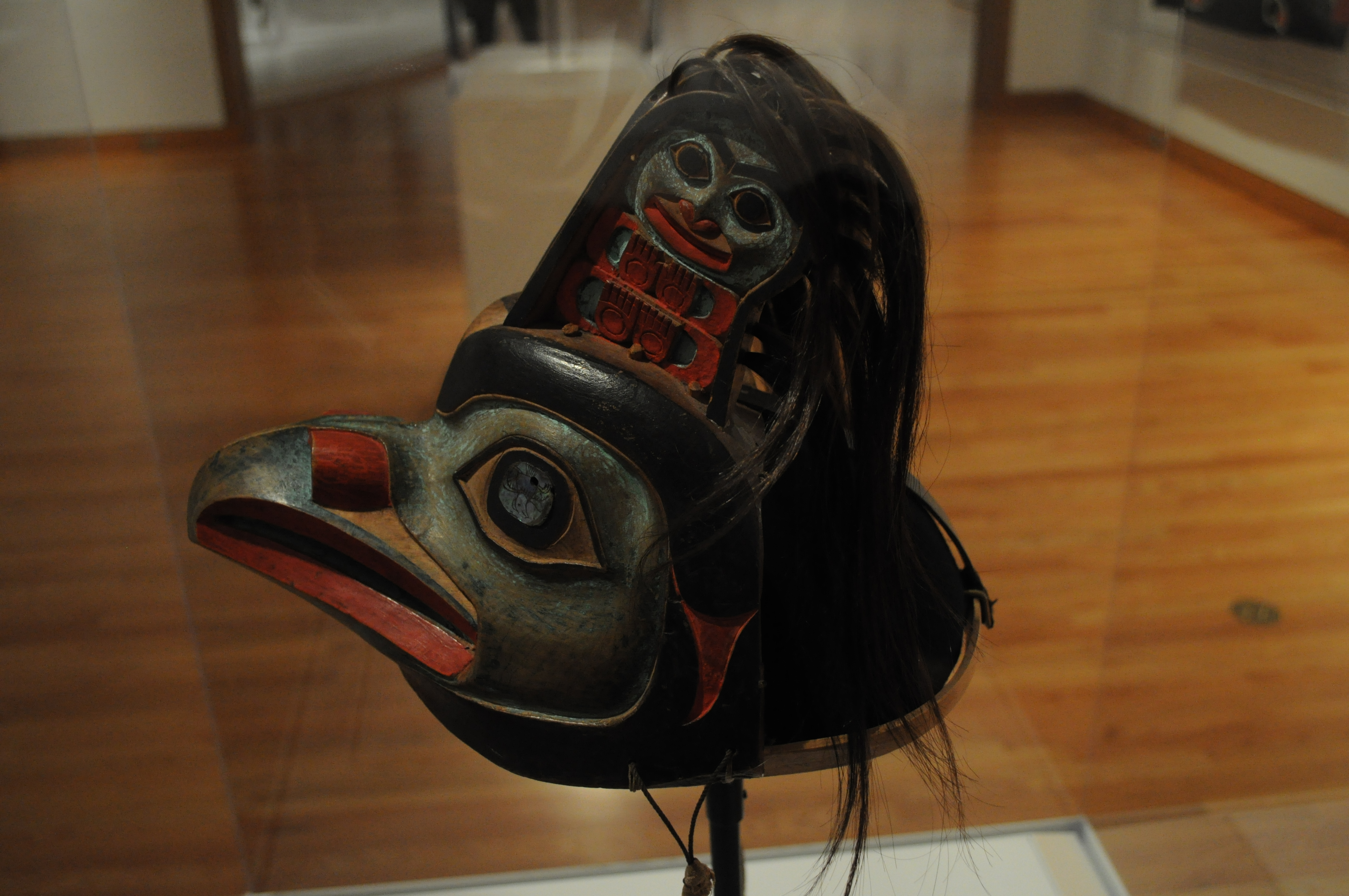
Raven at the Headwaters of Nass, ceremonial hat, Seattle Art Museum

Tlingit tribes historically built plank houses made from cedar and today call them clanhouses; these houses were built with a foundation such that they could store their belongings under the floors. It is said that these plank houses had no adhesive, nails, or any other sort of fastening devices. Clan houses were usually square or rectangular in shape and had front facing designs and totem poles to represent to which clan and moiety the makers belonged.

== Economy ==
Many Tlingit men work in the fishing industry while women are employed at canneries or in the local handicraft industry. These handicrafts include items like wood carvings and woven baskets which are sold for practical or tourist consumption.

== History ==
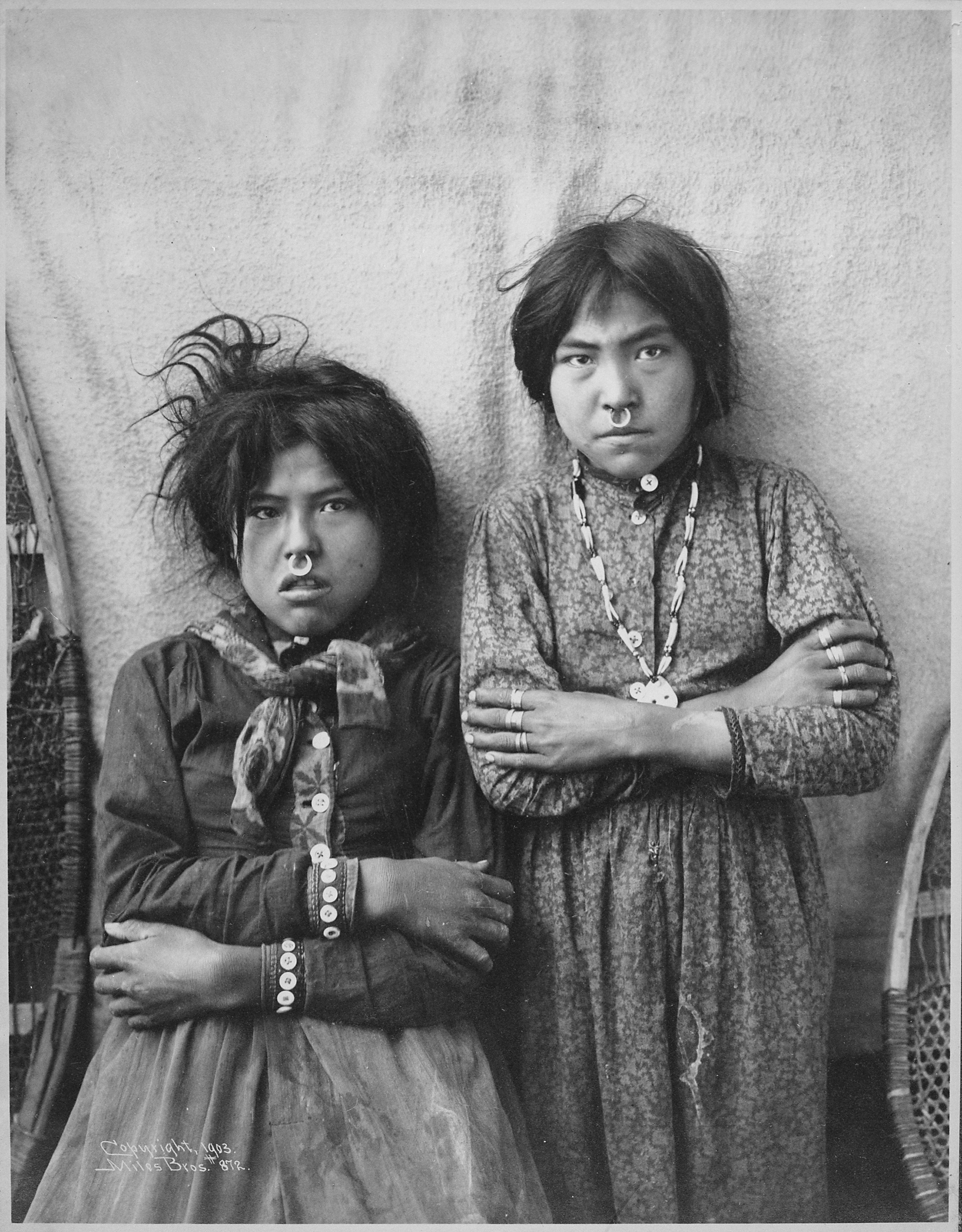
Two Tlingit girls, near Copper River (Alaska), 1903. Photograph taken by the Miles Brothers

Various cultures of Indigenous people have continuously occupied the Alaska territory for thousands of years, leading to the Tlingit. Human culture with elements related to the Tlingit originated around 10,000 years ago near the mouths of the Skeena and Nass Rivers. The historic Tlingit's first contact with Europeans came in 1741 with Russian explorers. Spanish explorers followed in 1775. Tlingits maintained their independence but suffered from epidemics of smallpox and other infectious diseases brought by the Europeans. The 1862 Pacific Northwest smallpox epidemic killed about 60% of the Mainland Tlingit and 37% of the Island Tlingit.

== Food ==
Food is a central part of Tlingit culture, and the land is an abundant provider. Most of the richness of intertidal life found on the beaches of Southeast Alaska can be harvested for food. Though eating off the beach could provide a fairly healthy and varied diet, eating nothing but "beach food" is considered contemptible among the Tlingit and a sign of poverty. Indeed, shamans and their families were required to abstain from all food gathered from the beach, and men might avoid eating beach food before battles or strenuous activities in the belief that it would weaken them spiritually and perhaps physically as well. Thus for both spiritual reasons as well as to add some variety to the diet, the Tlingit harvest many other resources for food besides those they easily find outside their front doors. No other food resource receives as much emphasis as salmon; however, seal and game are both close seconds.

Halibut, shellfish, and seaweed traditionally provided food in the spring, while late spring and summer bring seal and salmon. Summer is a time for gathering wild and tame berries, such as salmonberry, soap berry, and currants. In fall, sea otters are hunted. Herring and eulachon are also important staples, that can be eaten fresh or dried and stored for later use. Fish provide meat, oil, and eggs. Sea mammals, such as sea lions and sea otters, are used for food and clothing materials. In the forests near their homes, Tlingit hunted deer, bear, mountain goats and other small mammals.

== Genetics ==
Genetic analyses of HLA I and HLA II genes as well as HLA-A, -B, and -DRB1 gene frequencies links the Ainu people of Japan to some Indigenous peoples of the Americas, especially to populations on the Pacific Northwest Coast such as Tlingit. The scientists suggest that the main ancestor of the Ainu and of the Tlingit can be traced back to Paleolithic groups in Southern Siberia.

== Notable Tlingit people ==
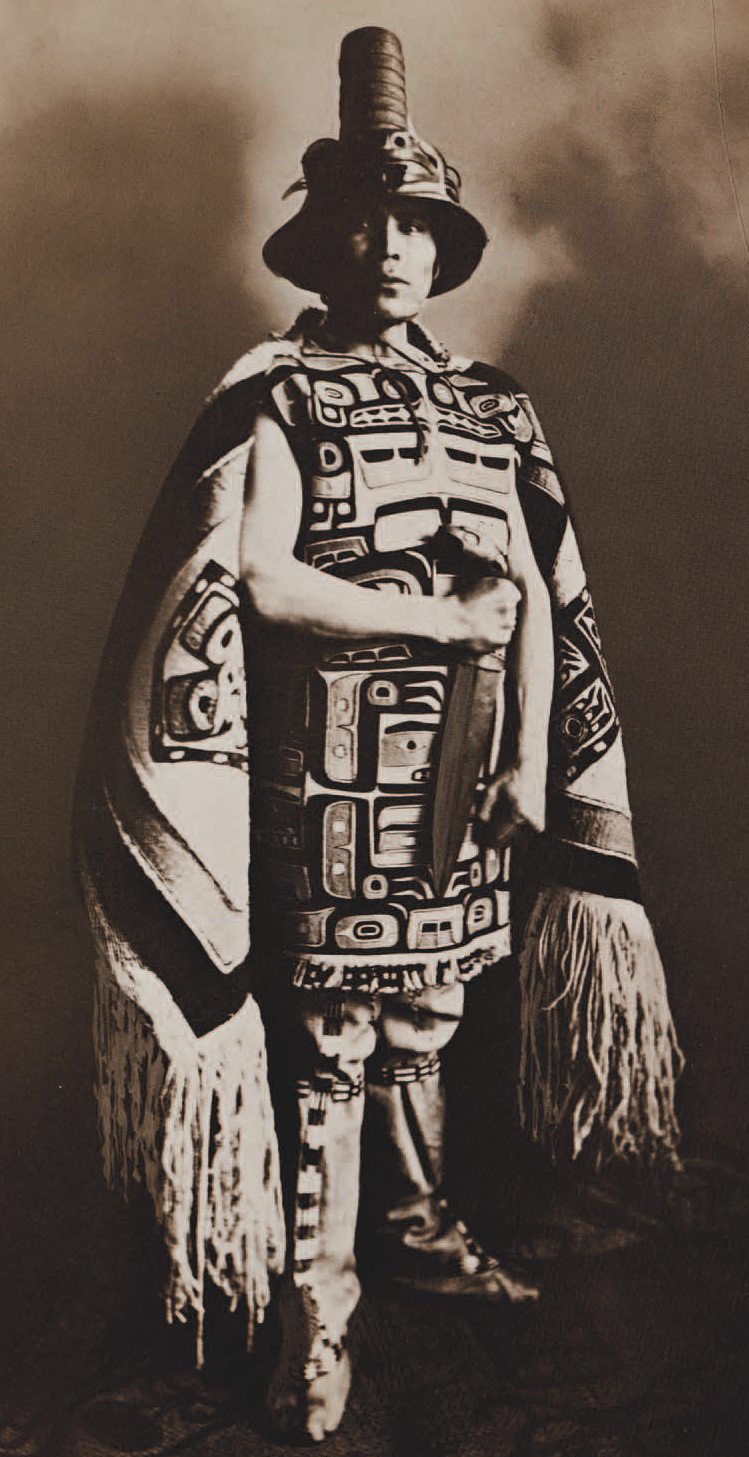
Louis Shotridge in Tlingit ceremonial costume, circa 1913

- Anna Brown Ehlers (b. 1955), Chilkat weaver
- Todd Gloria (b. 1978), politician
- Ernestine Hayes (b. 1945), poet, memorist, and professor
- Ursala Hudson, Chilkat and Ravenstail weaver
- Nathan Jackson (artist) (born 1938), woodcarver
- Esther Littlefield (1906–1997), artist, cultural interpreter
- Byron Mallott (1943–2020), Lieutenant Governor of Alaska (2014–2018)
- Nora Marks Dauenhauer (1927–2017), poet, author, and scholar
- Larry McNeil (b. 1955), photographer
- Da-ka-xeen Mehner, photographer and installation artist
- Tillie Paul (1863–1952), civil rights advocate and educator
- William Paul (1885–1977), attorney
- Elizabeth Peratrovich (1911–1958), civil rights advocate
- Clarissa Rizal (1956–2016), Chilkat and Ravenstail weaver
- Dino Rossi (b. 1959), politician
- Martin Sensmeier (b. 1985), actor
- Louis Shotridge (1883–1937), a Tlingit anthropologist and curator
- Preston Singletary (b. 1963), glass artist
- Walter Soboleff (1908–2011), scholar, elder, and religious leader
- Vera Starbard, playwright and author
- Jennie Thlunaut (c. 1891–1986), Chilkat weaver
- X̱ʼunei Lance Twitchell, scholar and author
- Amos Wallace (1920–2004), totem pole carver and artist
- X'unéi (unknown), a powerful Yakutat chief that went to war against Yeilxaak
- Yeilxaak (unknown–1791), the first chief of Klukwan to be encountered by Europeans

== See also ==
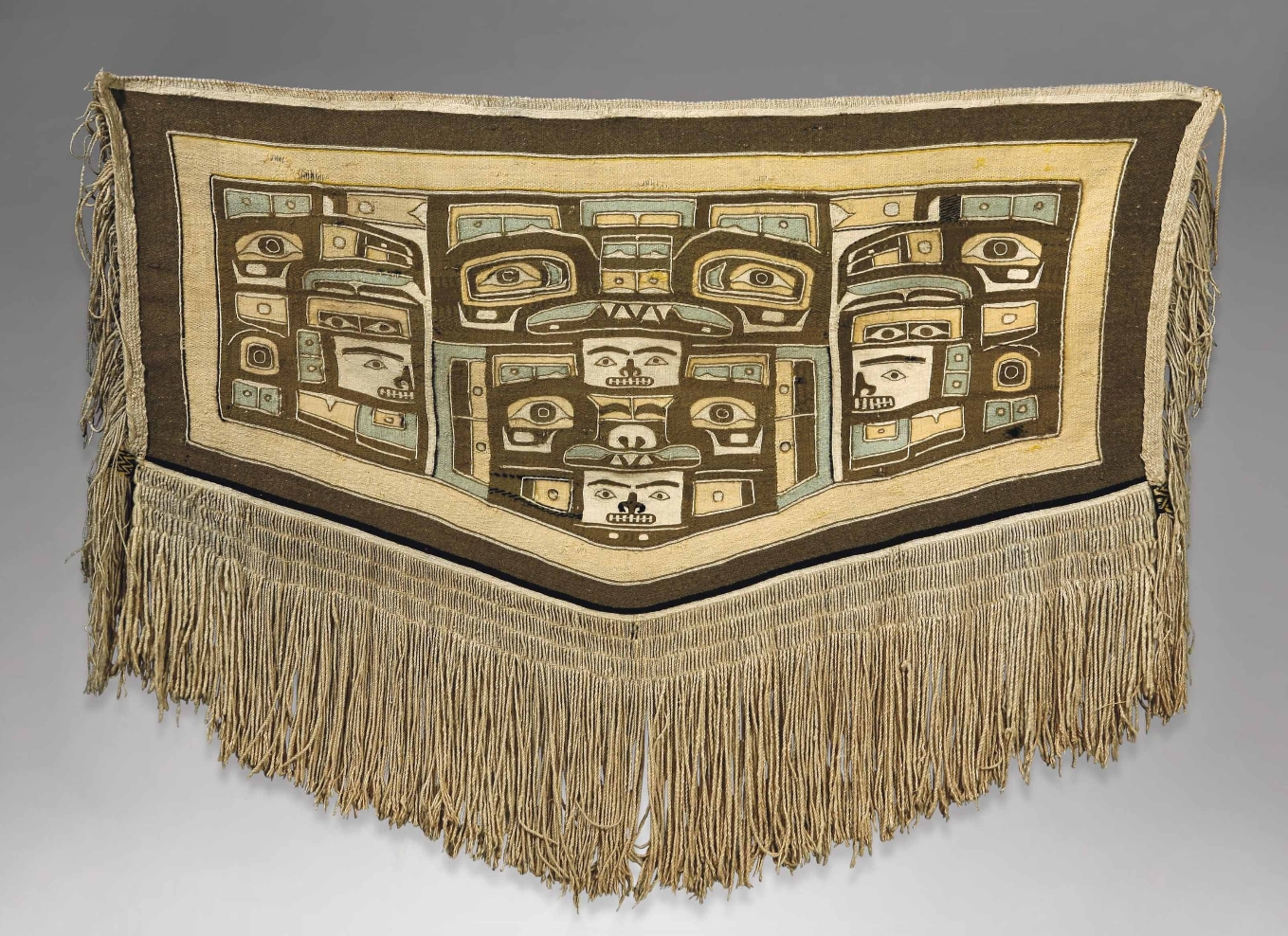
Chilkat blanket attributed to Mary Ebbetts Hunt (Anisalaga), 1823-1919

- Chilkat weaving
- Ravenstail weaving
- Battle of Sitka (Tlingit Rebellion, 1802)
- Battle of Port Gamble
- History of the Tlingit
- List of edible plants and mushrooms of southeast Alaska
- Maritime fur trade
- Tlingit clans
- Alaska Native storytelling
