= Delores Churchill =

Canadian Haida weaver

Delores E. Churchill
- Ilskyaalas
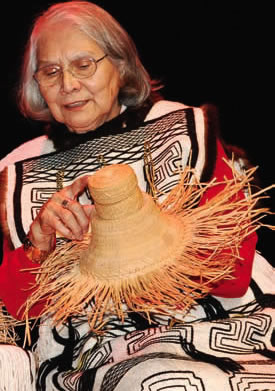
- Churchill with a partially woven basketry hat, 2006
- Born: 1929 (age 96–97); Old Massett, British Columbia, Canada
- Known for: Traditional weaving, language revitalization

Delores E. Churchill (Haida: Ilskyaalas; born 1929) is a First Nations (Haida) artist. She is a weaver of baskets, hats, robes, and other regalia, as well as leading revitalization efforts for Haida, her native language.

== Background ==
Churchill was born in Massett, Haida Gwaii in British Columbia, Canada in 1929. She first studied traditional Haida weaving with her mother, Selina Peratrovich, who is also a nationally recognized master weaver.

She went on to study traditional Tsimshian weaving from masters Flora Matthew and Brenda White. Churchill further studied at the British Museum and relearned the six-strand weave. After retiring from a bookkeeping career and raising her family, Churchill turned her attention back to basketry at a time when Haida basket weaving was in serious decline as an art form among younger members of the tribe. She taught her niece, Lisa Telford, traditional Haida basket weaving. Additionally Churchill studied ravenstail weaving under Cheryl Samuel.

Churchill is an eminent Haida weaver and an expert in gathering and preparing materials for cedar bark, spruce root, and Chilkat weaving. Her artistic influence and knowledge of the art stretches around the globe. Churchill has taught basketry and exhibited her works and has also worked as a researcher and consultant, helping identify works in museum collections.

== Artwork ==
Churchill is known for her utilitarian and ceremonial objects that often use spruce root, cedar bark, wool, and natural dyes. Some of her artwork is displayed at the Totem Heritage Center in Ketchikan, Alaska, where she has also taught courses in basketry.

== Haida language revitalization ==
As one of the few remaining native speakers of Haida, Churchill has fought to share her linguistic heritage. Canada and the United States both suppressed use of the Haida language, especially through forcing Native children to speak English in boarding schools. Churchill was forced by her teachers in the Canadian residential school she attended as a child to speak English and was punished for speaking her own language. Despite these challenges, Churchill has remained adamant in her desire to preserve her native language and frequently works with Haida children and assisted her daughter April Churchill's language revitalization.

== Awards and honors ==
Churchill is the recipient of numerous awards, including:

- Alaska State Council on the Arts fellowship
- United States Artists Fellowship, 2020
- Lifetime Achievement Award from the Central Council of Tlingit and Haida Indian Tribes of Alaska, 2017
- National Basketry Association Lifetime Achievement Award, 2017
- National Heritage Fellowship from the National Endowment for the Arts, 2006
- Lifetime Fellowship Award, Rasmuson Foundation, 2006
- Connie Boochever Fellowship, 2003
- Governor's Award for the Arts, 2003
- First People's Fund Community Spirit Award, 2002
- National Endowment for the Arts, Creative Artists Residencies, Hull, Quebec, 1996
- Fellow, Canadian Museum of Civilization, Hull, Quebec, 1996
- Honorary Doctorate of Humane Letters, University of Alaska Southeast, Juneau, 1991
- The Lisle Fellowship, Art and Culture in Mexico, Guadalajara, Mexico, 1991
- Alaska State Legislative Award in recognition of commitment to Native art, 1986
