= Klukwan, Alaska =

Klukwan, Alaska Tlingit: Tlákw.aan
- Census-designated place
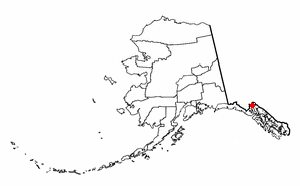
- Location of Klukwan, Alaska
- Coordinates: 59°24′0″N 135°53′36″W
- Country: United States
- State: Alaska
- Census Area: Hoonah-Angoon

Government
  - State senator: Jesse Kiehl (D)
  - State rep.: Andi Story (D)

Area
  - Total: 1.89 sq mi (4.90 km^{2})
  - Land: 1.39 sq mi (3.60 km^{2})
  - Water: 0.50 sq mi (1.30 km^{2})
- Elevation: 272 ft (83 m)

Population (2020)
  - Total: 87
  - Density: 62.6/sq mi (24.18/km^{2})
- Time zone: UTC-9 (Alaska (AKST))
  - Summer (DST): UTC-8 (AKDT)
- ZIP code: 99827
- Area code: 907
- FIPS code: 02-40510
- GNIS feature ID: 1866956

Klukwan (Tlingit: Tlákw.aan) is a census-designated place (CDP) in Alaska, United States. It is technically in Hoonah-Angoon Census Area, though it is an enclave of Haines Borough. As of the 2020 census, Klukwan had a population of 87.

The Chilkat Indian Village, a federally recognized tribe, is headquartered in Klukwan.

== History ==
Klukwan began as a Chilkat Tlingit village along the trade route later known as the Dalton Trail. In 1880, the U.S. Navy reported the name of the village as "Chilcat of Klukquan". The name is Tlakw Áan in Tlingit, meaning roughly "forever village" due to its antiquity. Klukwan is the only remaining of five Chilkat villages that were in the area before 1900.

== Geography ==
Klukwan is located at 59°24′0″N 135°53′36″W (59.400098, -135.893393). It is 21 miles (34 km) northwest of Haines, on the north side of the Chilkat River near the Haines Highway. It is bordered to the west by the Covenant Life CDP.

According to the United States Census Bureau, the Klukwan CDP has a total area of 1.9 square miles (4.9 km^{2}), of which 1.4 square miles (3.6 km^{2}) are land and 0.50 square miles (1.3 km^{2}), or 26.55%, are water.

Klukwan is an enclave of Haines Borough, Alaska. Although Klukwan is located in the Hoonah-Angoon Census Area of the Unorganized Borough, it is entirely surrounded by territory of Haines Borough, and therefore cut off from the rest of the Census Area.

== Demographics ==
Historical population
Census	Pop.	Note	%±
1880	565		—
1890	326		−42.3%
1910	245		—
1920	167		−31.8%
1930	97		−41.9%
1940	97		0.0%
1950	91		−6.2%
1960	112		23.1%
1970	103		−8.0%
1980	135		31.1%
1990	129		−4.4%
2000	139		7.8%
2010	95		−31.7%
2020	87		−8.4%
U.S. Decennial Census

Klukwan first appeared on the 1880 U.S. Census as "Kluckquan", an unincorporated Tlingit village. With 565 residents, it was recorded as the 5th largest community in Alaska. In 1890, it reported as "Klakwan." It next appeared in 1910 under its present spelling of Klukwan. It was made a census-designated place (CDP) as of the 1980 census.

As of the census of 2000, there were 139 people, 44 households, and 31 families residing in the CDP. The population density was 111.9 inhabitants per square mile (43.2/km^{2}). There were 85 housing units at an average density of 68.4 per square mile (26.4/km^{2}). The racial makeup of the CDP was 10.07% White, 88.49% Native American, 0.72% Asian, and 0.72% from two or more races. 3.60% of the population were Hispanic or Latino of any race.

There were 44 households, out of which 54.5% had children under the age of 18 living with them, 45.5% were married couples living together, 15.9% had a female householder with no husband present, and 27.3% were non-families. 25.0% of all households were made up of individuals, and 6.8% had someone living alone who was 65 years of age or older. The average household size was 3.16 and the average family size was 3.75.

In the CDP, the age distribution of the population shows 33.1% under the age of 18, 13.7% from 18 to 24, 23.7% from 25 to 44, 23.0% from 45 to 64, and 6.5% who were 65 years of age or older. The median age was 27 years. For every 100 females, there were 104.4 males. For every 100 females age 18 and over, there were 121.4 males.

The median income for a household in the CDP was $30,714, and the median income for a family was $31,563. Males had a median income of $26,250 versus $26,250 for females. The per capita income for the CDP was $11,612. There were none of the families and 1.5% of the population living below the poverty line, including no under eighteens and none of those over 64.
