= Evolutionary models of food sharing =

Systems describing the emergence of resource sharing in nature

Evolutionary biologists have developed various theoretical models to explain the evolution of food-sharing behavior—"[d]efined as the unresisted transfer of food" from one food-motivated individual to another—among humans and other animals.

Models of food-sharing are based upon general evolutionary theory. When applied to human behavior, these models are considered a branch of human behavioral ecology. Researchers have developed several types of food-sharing models, involving phenomena such as kin selection, reciprocal altruism, tolerated theft, group cooperation, and costly signaling. Kin-selection and reciprocal-altruism models of food-sharing are based upon evolutionary concepts of kin selection and altruism. Since the theoretical basis of these models involves reproductive fitness, one underlying assumption of these models is that greater resource-accumulation increases reproductive fitness. Food-sharing has been theorized as an important development in early human evolution.

== Kin selection models ==
W. D. Hamilton was among the first to propose an explanation for natural selection of altruistic behaviors among related individuals. According to his model, natural selection will favor altruistic behavior towards kin when the benefit (as a contributing factor to reproductive fitness) towards the recipient (scaled based upon Wright's coefficient of genetic relatedness between donor and recipient) outweighs the cost of giving. In other words, kin selection implies that food will be given when there is a great benefit to the recipient with low cost to the donor. An example of this would be sharing food among kin during a period of surplus. The implications of kin-selection is that natural selection will also favor the development of ways of determining kin from non-kin and close kin from distant kin. When Hamilton's rule is applied to food-sharing behavior, a simple expectation of the model is that close kin should receive food shares either more frequently or in larger quantities than distant relatives and non-kin. Additionally, greater imbalances in the quantities shared between close kin are expected than those shared with non-kin or distantly related individuals However, if reciprocal altruism is an important factor, then this may not be the case among close kin who are also reciprocity partners (see subsection below). Based on Feinman's extension of Hamilton's model, cheating such as recipients not sharing food with their donors, is more likely to take place between unrelated (or distantly related) individuals than closely related individuals.

== Reciprocal models ==
In addition to expanding the ideas of Hamilton and kin-based altruism, Saul Feinman also theorized food-sharing based on Robert Trivers' model of reciprocal altruism. Following Trivers' ideas, reciprocal altruism models of food-sharing generate expectations of when and how a recipient of food from a donor will share food in a future interaction with that donor. Like the kin selection model, food will be shared when the benefit towards the recipient is greater than the costs to the donor, such as a period of surplus.

Food sharing in chimpanzees

In 1984, Jim Moore proposed a model for the evolution of reciprocal food-sharing based on evidence from chimpanzees and modern human hunter-gatherer groups. This model was designed to address problems that Trivers' model failed to address. One problem, according to Moore, was that the model did not adequately explain the initial development of reciprocal altruism. If a population started with one reciprocal altruist who only gives benefits to other reciprocal altruists, then this trait would not be selected as there would be no other altruists to interact with.

Moore's model made the following assumptions:

- Humans evolved from chimp-like ancestors with a similar hierarchical social structure (i.e., open dominance hierarchy that is male-dominated)
- Males were highly motivated to achieve high rank. The short term reward of this was the position itself and the long-term reward was reproductive success, which resulted from greater access to mates with high rank position.
- Begging behavior similar to that of chimpanzees existed, such as that between an infant and mother
- There is an intermediate range of resource abundance that will favor sharing (e.g., meat for human ancestors that were occasionally-carnivorous herbivores)

With these assumptions, Moore proposed that human ancestors would have learned to hunt and share food if they faced punitive action from other group members if an individual did not share food with the group. An individual who finds a scarce, defensible resource would have faced begging behavior from other group members. Costs and benefits of sharing in this scenario can be sorted into status, fight risk, and nutritional value. Nutritional value is determined by the size of the food portion relative to the nutritional needs of the individuals. The nutritional value remains constant throughout this scenario, or declines in value as portions of it are consumed by the obtaining individual. As another individual begs with increasing intensity, the beggar's social cost increases, until the beggar's social costs exceed that of fighting; this is paralleled by the benefits to the food-obtainer. If the benefits to the food-obtainer exceed the beggar's cost of fighting, then the beggar should attack. At or before this time, the food-obtainer should decide to share or not. This decision is made depending on the expected reaction from the beggar. It is expected that they will decide to share at a time that would maximize benefits and minimize loss in nutritional value. If the beggar was initially dominant, it may follow up the first sharing interaction with further begging or fighting, reciprocation of sharing, or let the incident pass. Further begging and fighting impose risk onto the beggar as the food-obtainer might feel and behave dominantly and become dominant if the beggar loses. Inaction allows the food-obtainer to remain slightly dominant. If other group members witnessed this change in dominance position, then the beggar may demonstrate redirected aggression and attack a lower-rank bystander. Later, when the beggar obtains food, it may choose to reciprocate after getting the initial food-obtainer to beg, but this only occurs if the benefits offered exceed the status cost of the initial food-obtainer's begging. Thus, Moore's model predicted that natural selection would favor aggressive sharing and assertive reciprocation to re-establish status.

Feinman attempted to combine kin selection and reciprocal food-sharing models. Based on inequalities in direct access to food resources among hunter-gatherers, donors are more likely to share foods that their recipients do not have direct access to. Feinman also hypothesizes that, as a donor's reproductive value decreases, the probability of the donor giving food increases, either with or without reciprocal sharing. For example, older individuals (mostly women) in some foraging societies will share food and care of younger unrelated individuals. Further, the probability of a donor giving food will decrease as the reproductive value of a recipient also decreases. Some foods are not as predictable in their distribution and are thus termed less reliable. As foods become less reliable, they are expected to be shared more because they are rarer than more commonly encountered food sources. As food becomes scarcer, donors are expected to become more strict in their sharing habits and may favor close relatives, recipients who actively reciprocate and give food, and recipients with higher reproductive value (such as younger offspring or prospective mates) over others. Donors will also tend to share with those who remain familiar and in close proximity to them. Feinman also hypothesizes that donors are more likely to share with those who are culturally similar to them over those who are culturally different.

Recent studies of chimpanzees and other nonhuman primates have found evidence to support reciprocal sharing; however, other factors such as grooming and begging behaviors may also contribute to patterns of nonhuman primate food sharing.

== Tolerated theft ==
Models of tolerated theft seek to explain why in some hunter-gatherer societies, scrounging behaviour is tolerated by other members of a group. This developed in response to variance-reduction models, as reciprocal behavior might have socially related taboos tied to it (such as rules preventing a person to accumulate more wealth). Variance-reduction models seek to explain why redistribution of large food packages (caches or prey items) occurs in daily practices of hunter-gatherers. According to variance reduction theory, it is more optimal to do so than to let excess food rot or spoil.

Blurton Jones argued from an evolutionary biology perspective that, if these taboos did not exist, then it would be more beneficial to be selfish if one found food and did not share and also accepted shares from others (essentially, a cheater under altruism models). Under this idea, selfishness would be expected to develop as a dominant behavior. Unlike cooperative models that link sharing to hunting, tolerated theft links sharing to arrival of any food package (either hunted or scavenged). Cooperative and reciprocal models, according to Jones, could not explain how food-sharing initially developed in societies. He claimed tolerated theft did, then once it became frequent, reciprocal altruism could develop.

Jones outlines several assumptions for his model of tolerated theft:

- Food can be taken by force, unlike rescue or other reciprocal behaviors
- Food can be broken apart into portions, like parts of a single carcass
- Individuals fight only for fitness gain. In this case, a resource's fitness benefit determines the fight outcome. Individuals with much to gain will fight harder and usually win, gaining the fitness benefit.
- Resource values are unequal, but individuals have equal resource holding potential (RHP), a measurement of strength and fighting ability.
- Some parts of a food package will have higher value than others (i.e., they follow a diminishing value curve).

Therefore, the individual that obtains a large package of food (in cases where this seldom happens) faces asymmetric contests over food, and the obtainer does not benefit from fighting over less valuable portions. However, latecomers who have not obtained food on their own will have much to gain even from the less valuable portions. It is not worth the effort for a food-obtainer to fight over these portions, and so the obtainer should be expected to relinquish these without a fight since it would likely lose to the latecomer. Thus, another expectation is that natural selection will favor the ability to assess costs and benefits. Among frequently interacting individuals, the roles of obtainer and latecomer/thief are interchanged, balancing out benefits of latecomer gains and obtainer losses, so reciprocation develops to avoid injury. Equal, reciprocal sharing is the eventual consequence from this tolerated theft behavior. When food packages are small to begin with, then theft is less tolerated as portions have lower returns along the assumed diminishing value curve. Hoarding is expected in cases where either food can be defended, there is a season of scarcity, a synchronous glut (ex. salmon run or agricultural harvest), or when accumulated food no longer follows a diminishing curve (as with financial capital). Scrounging is expected to increase among groups when active foragers miss out on sharing opportunities due to their own acts of less successful foraging. Foragers do worse than scroungers because scroungers are able to participate in 100% of sharing events.

Based on studies by de Waal and others, chimpanzees exhibit tolerated theft behaviors. These are typically between mother and offspring and involve commonly available plant foods.

== Costly signaling models ==
Costly signaling has been interpreted from ethnographic studies in regards to food sharing to explain why certain individuals (primarily males) tend to target difficult-to-acquire foods that sometimes produce less optimal yields. One explanation for this behavior is as a means for males to signal their reproductive quality to prospective mates. This strategy increases reproductive success of hunters who successfully capture these costly resources; however, they risk increasing sexual conflicts with their mates. For high-quality individuals who can both invest less in current partnerships and signal at low cost, this behavior is most profitable.

In their study of turtle hunting by the Meriam people (one of the indigenous Torres Strait Islander peoples), Smith and Bliege Bird frame this collective food-sharing behavior within a costly signaling framework. Among the Meriam, a family will sponsor a turtle-hunting group to collect turtles for feasting purposes associated with funerary activities. Since the hunting group does not receive any of the turtles in return, this behavior does not fit within a reciprocal or cooperative food-sharing framework. Instead, the benefits to hunters is through the signals from hunting. The leaders of these hunting groups signal their skills, specialized knowledge, and charisma which allow them to gain widespread social status when they are successful. This benefit allows hunters to gain priority in other social considerations such as marriages and alliances. The family who sponsored these hunting groups receives all of the captured turtles with no expectation of reciprocal payment in the future. The costs to the hunters are through provisioning the hunt itself, including the purchase of fuel for the boats.

== Group cooperation models ==
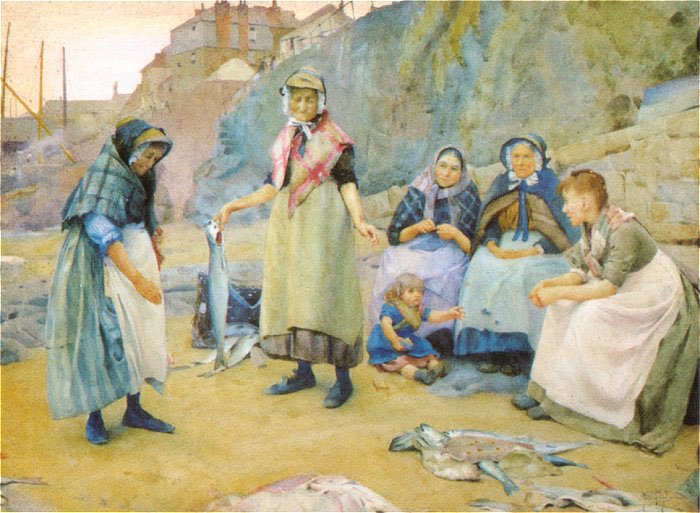
Sharing Fish: painting by Thomas Cooper Gotch, 1891

Among human societies, groups often target foods that pose some level of difficulty in their acquisition. These activities generally require the cooperation of several individuals. Despite the fact that a number of individuals are involved in this acquisition, ownership of the acquired food often goes to a single individual, such as the finder or the one who successfully kills the animal. Owners may share with nonowners who helped in acquiring a food resource; however, this act of sharing may be a means of ensuring cooperation in future activities. For example, the Inupiat of the Northwest Coast of North America shared specific portions of whales depending on membership and role in the successful whaling party. From this perspective, food-sharing is a form of trade-based reciprocal altruism where privately owned food is used to reward labor.

Another consideration of group cooperation is as a way to increase food yields in comparison to acquiring food individually; this can be considered a form of mutualism. Bruce Winterhalder incorporates food-sharing among groups into the diet breadth model derived from optimal foraging theory as a means to reduce risk. Risk is measured in this model as a measure of the probability that a forager's net acquisition rate (NAR) falls below a minimum value, such as a threshold for starvation. Through the use of a stochastic model, a group of independent foragers are able to meet and pool their resources at the end of a foraging period and divide the total resources equally among the group. Through a series of simulations exploring values of group size and other parameters of the model, the results suggest that risk is effectively reduced by pooling and dividing equal shares of resources. When compared with changes in diet breadth, sharing seems to be better at reducing risk than changing the diet breadth. Examination of various group sizes suggests that small groups are capable of effectively reducing risk.

== See also ==
- Altruism
- Human behavioral ecology
- Human evolution
- Parental investment
