= Stotting =

Jumping display of quadrupeds

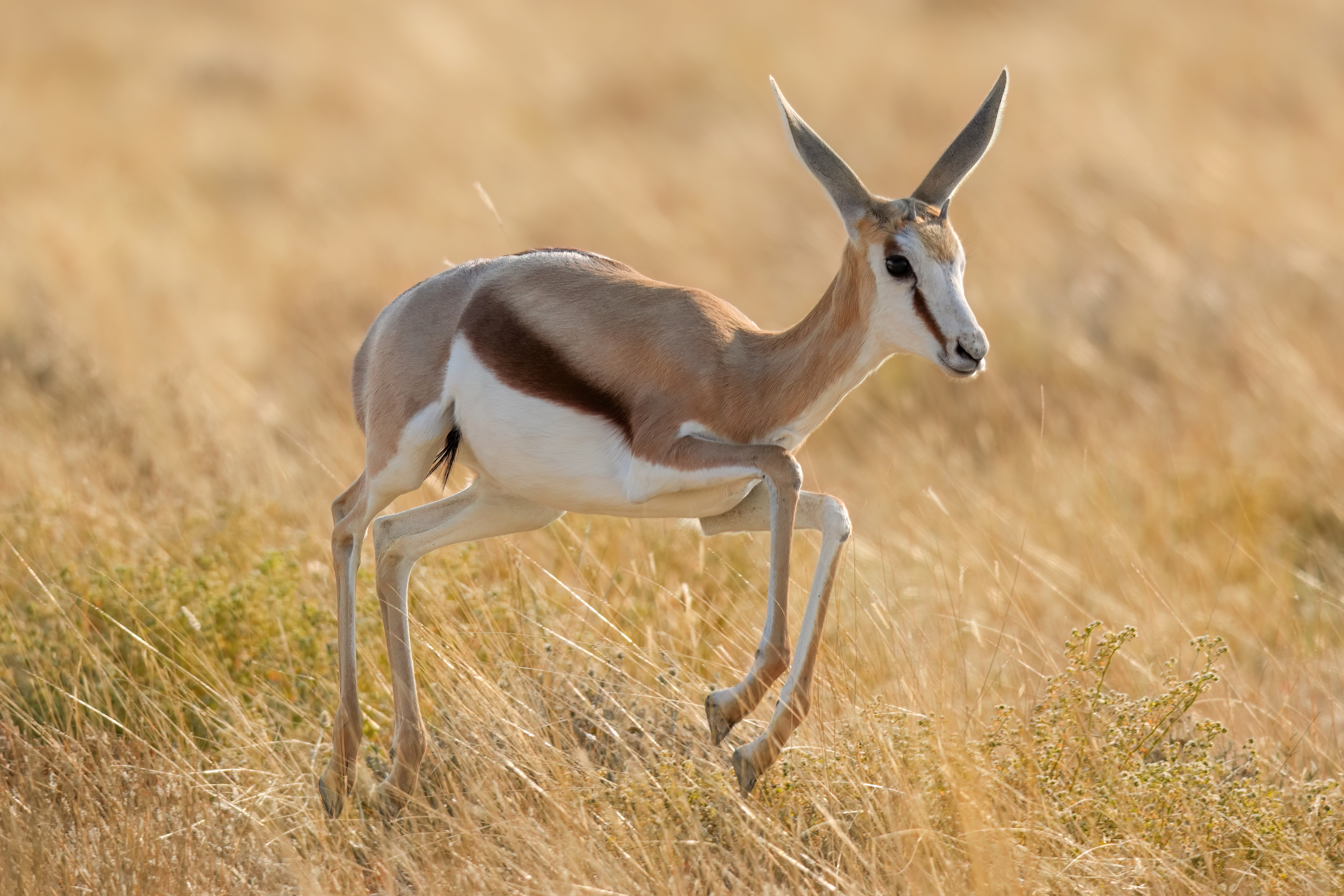
Juvenile springbok stotting in Etosha National Park

Stotting (also called pronking or pronging) is a behavior of quadrupeds, particularly gazelles, in which they spring into the air, lifting all four feet off the ground simultaneously. Usually, the legs are held in a relatively stiff position. Many explanations of stotting have been proposed, though for several of them there is little evidence either for or against.

The question of why prey animals stot has been investigated by evolutionary biologists including John Maynard Smith, C. D. Fitzgibbon, and Tim Caro; all of them conclude that the most likely explanation given the available evidence is that it is an honest signal to predators that the stotting animal would be difficult to catch. Such a signal is called "honest" as it is not deceptive in any way, and would benefit both predator and prey: the predator as it avoids a costly and unproductive chase, and the prey as it does not get chased.

== Etymology ==
Stot is a common Scots and Northern English verb meaning "bounce" or "walk with a bounce". Uses in this sense include stotting a ball off a wall, and rain stotting off a pavement. Pronking comes from the Afrikaans verb pronk-, which means "show off" or "strut", and is a cognate of the English verb "prance".

== Taxonomic distribution ==
Stotting occurs in several deer species of North America, including mule deer and Columbian black-tailed deer, as well as pronghorn, when a predator is particularly threatening, and in a variety of ungulate species from Africa, including Thomson's gazelle and springbok. It is also said to occur in the blackbuck, a species found in India.

Stotting occurs in domesticated livestock such as sheep and goats, typically only in young animals.

== Possible explanations ==
Stotting makes a prey animal more visible, and uses up time and energy that could be spent on escaping from the predator. Since it is dangerous, the continued performance of stotting by prey animals must bring some benefit to the animal (or its family group) performing the behavior. Several possible explanations have been proposed, namely that stotting may be:

1. A good means of rapid escape or jumping over obstructions. However, this cannot be true in Thomson's gazelles because these prey animals do not stot when a predator is less than approximately 40 m away.
2. An anti-ambush behavior; animals living in tall grass may leap into the air to detect potential predators. There is some evidence for this.
3. An alarm signal to other members of the herd that a predator is hazardously close thereby increasing the survival rate of the herd. This would be an instance of group selection, a theory heavily criticized by evolutionary biologists.
4. A socially cohesive behavior to escape predators by coordinated stotting, thereby making it more difficult for a predator to target any individual during an attack. This too would be group selection, subject to the same objections.
5. An honest signal of the animal's fitness. Stotting could be a way of deterring pursuit by warning a predator of the animal's unsuitability as prey: the prey benefits by not being chased (because it is in fact very fit); the predator benefits by not wasting time chasing an animal it is unlikely to catch. This signaling explanation avoids the group selection connotations of the "alarm signal" and "socially cohesive" escape hypotheses.
6. An instance of Amotz Zahavi's handicap principle, whereby stotting is signaling to predators that the animal is so fit it can escape even if it deliberately slows itself down with some apparently useless behavior (i.e. stotting).
7. A predator detection signal whereby the animal signals to the predator that it has been seen and therefore does not have the advantage of surprise. Many such signals exist in different groups of animals. Again, this would be an honest pursuit deterrence signal, benefiting the prey by not being chased (because it can be seen to be aware of the predator and ready to escape immediately) and benefitting the predator by not wasting time stalking prey when it has already been seen. Evidence for this hypothesis is that cheetahs abandon more hunts when their gazelle prey stots, and when they do give chase to a stotting gazelle, they are far less likely to make a kill. However, gazelles stot less often to cheetahs (which stalk and would therefore probably give up when detected) than to African wild dogs, which "course" (chase prey relentlessly, not relying on surprise).
8. A fitness display to potential mates in a sexual selection process rather than an antipredator adaptation.
9. Play, especially in young animals, which may help to prepare them for adult life. In favor of this hypothesis, stotting is sometimes observed in immature animals; against this is the fact that stotting is generally seen in adult prey responding to predators.

The English evolutionary biologist John Maynard Smith concludes that "the natural explanation is that stotting is an index of condition and of escape capability", used as a signal especially to coursing predators. He also observes that "it is hard to see how it could be a handicap", unless perhaps it is a signal to other gazelles of the same species. C. D. Fitzgibbon agrees that it is most likely an honest signal of condition. Tim Caro argues that there is insufficient evidence "to support or refute a startle effect of stotting, prey signalling its health, the Social Cohesion hypothesis or [an] alarm function of stotting"; in his view, stotting informs a predator that it has been detected.

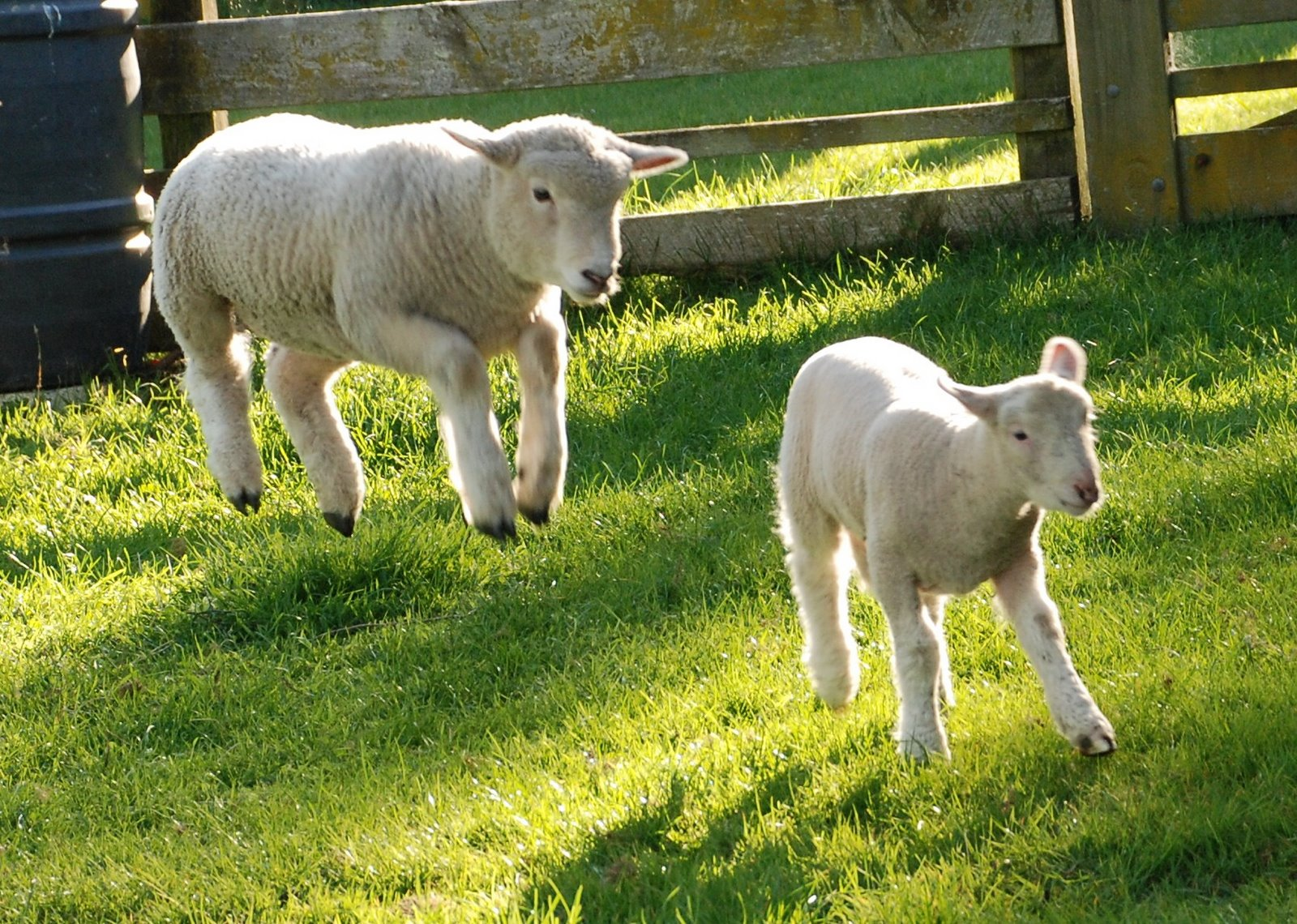
A lamb stotting

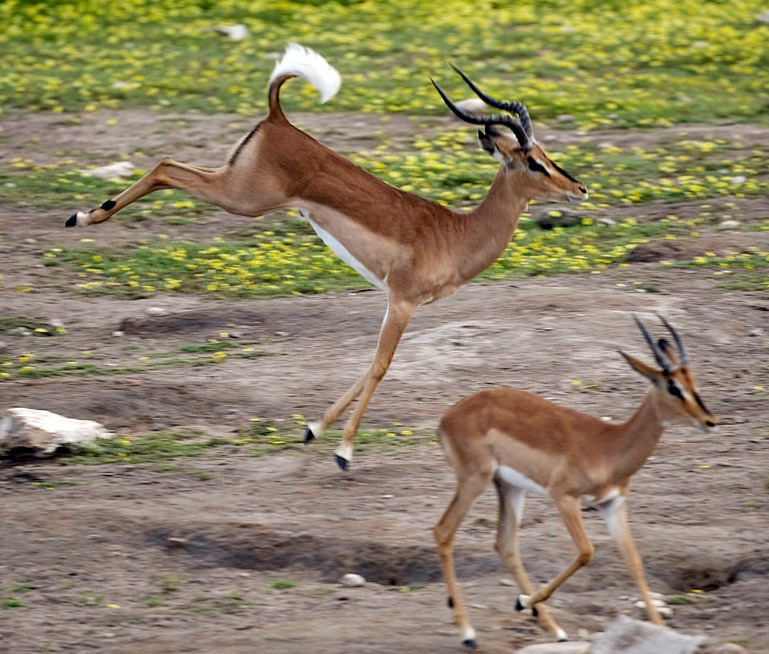
An adult male black-faced impala stotting in Namibia

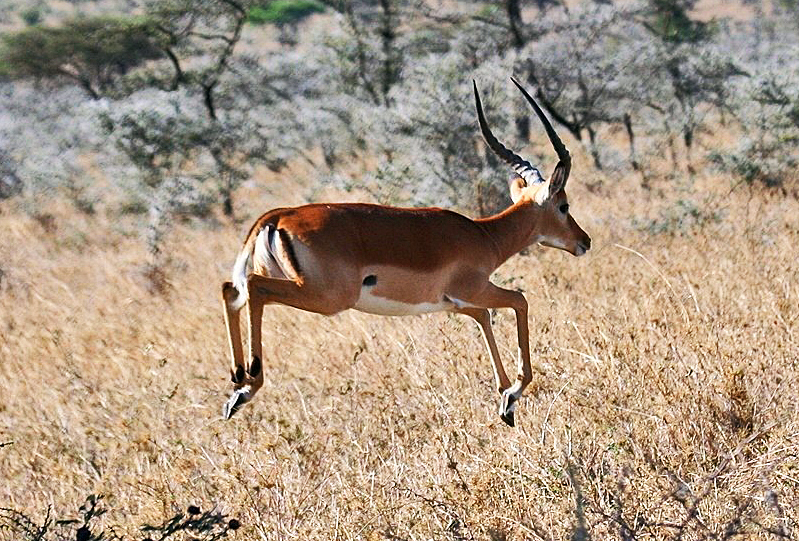
An impala stotting

== See also ==
- Aposematism
- Deimatic behaviour
