= Handicap principle =

Hypothesis in evolutionary biology

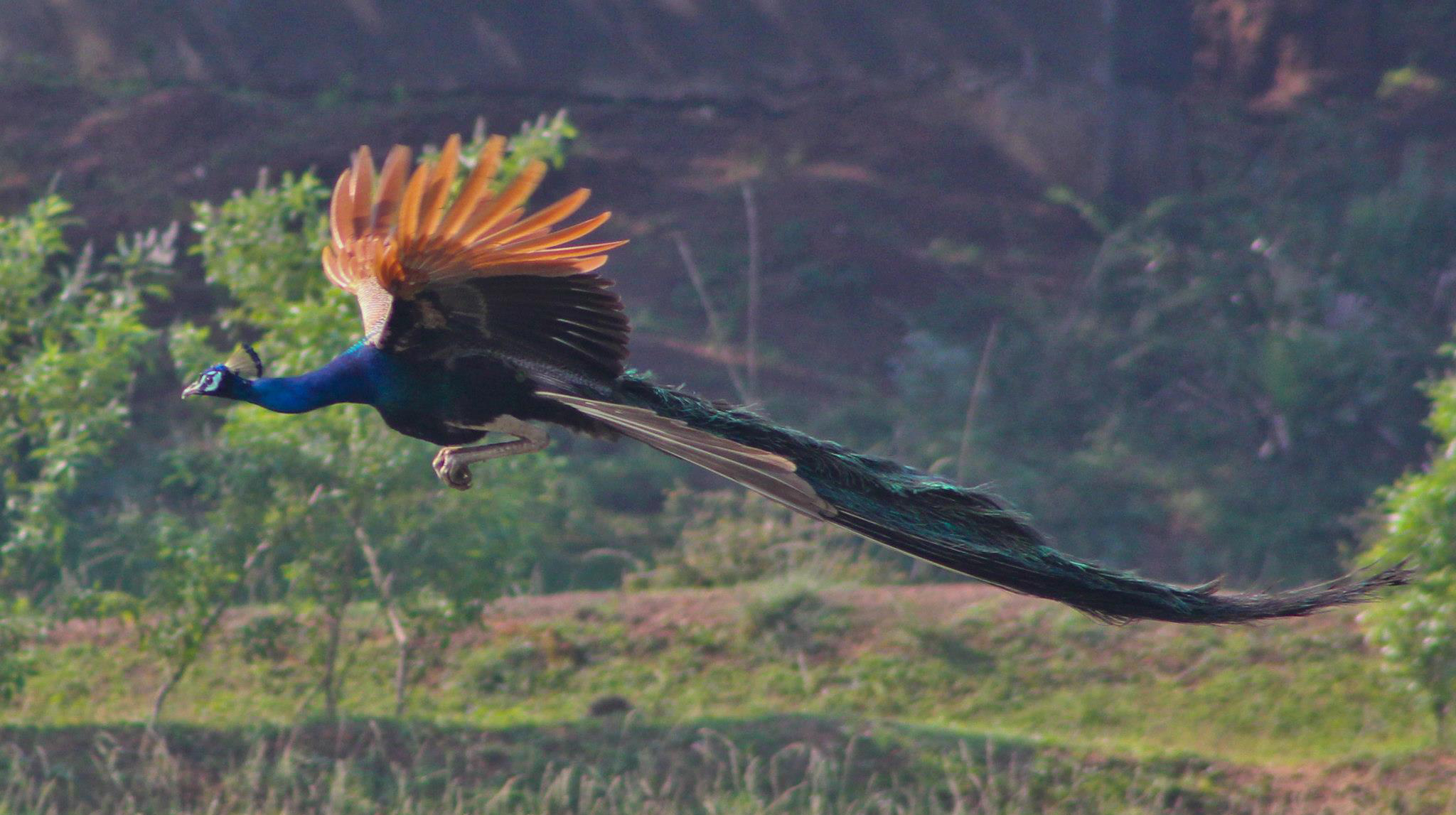
The peacock tail in flight, a classic example of what Amotz Zahavi proposed was a handicapped signal of male quality

The handicap principle is a hypothesis proposed by the Israeli biologist Amotz Zahavi in 1975. It is meant to explain how "signal selection" during mate choice may lead to "honest" or reliable signalling between male and female animals which have an obvious motivation to bluff or deceive each other. The handicap principle suggests that secondary sexual characteristics are costly signals which must be reliable, as they cost the signaller resources that individuals with less of a particular trait could not afford. The handicap principle further proposes that animals of greater biological fitness signal this through handicapping behaviour, or morphology that effectively lowers overall fitness. The central idea is that sexually selected traits function like conspicuous consumption, signalling the ability to afford to squander a resource. Receivers then know that the signal indicates quality, because inferior-quality signallers are unable to produce such wastefully extravagant signals.

The handicap principle is supported by game theory modelling representing situations such as nestlings begging for food, predator-deterrent signalling, and threat displays. However, honest signals are not necessarily costly, undermining the theoretical basis for the handicap principle, which remains unconfirmed by empirical evidence.

== History ==
=== Origins ===
The handicap principle was proposed in 1975 by the Israeli biologist Amotz Zahavi. He argued that mate choice involving what he called "signal selection" would lead to "honest" or reliable signalling between male and female animals, even though they have an interest in bluffing or deceiving each other. The handicap principle asserts that secondary sexual characteristics are costly signals, which are reliable indicators of the signaller's quality, since they cost the signaller resources that lower-quality individuals could not afford. The generality of the phenomenon is a matter of some debate and disagreement, and Zahavi's views on the scope and importance of handicaps in biology have not been accepted by the mainstream. Nevertheless, the idea has been very influential, with most researchers in the field believing that the theory explains some aspects of animal communication.

=== Grafen's signaling game model ===
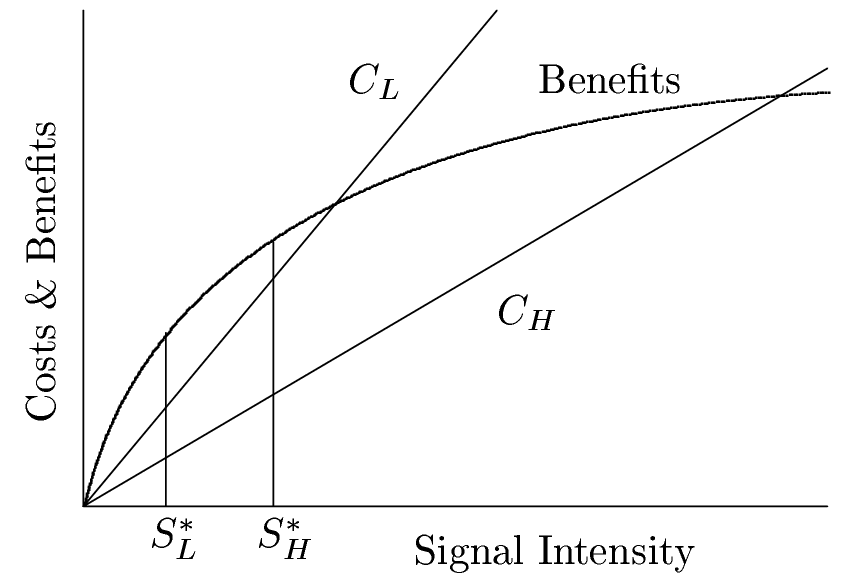
Graph based on Johnstone's 1997 graphical representation of a Zahavian handicap. Where $C_L$ is cost to a low-quality signaller and $C_H$ is cost to a high-quality signaller. Optimal signalling levels are $S^*_L$ for a low-quality signaller, and $S^*_H$ for a high-quality signaller.

The handicap principle was initially controversial, with the British biologist John Maynard Smith a notable early critic of Zahavi's ideas. However, the handicap principle gained wider acceptance because it is supported by game theory models, most notably the Scottish biologist Alan Grafen's 1990 signalling game model. This was essentially a rediscovery of the Canadian-American economist Michael Spence's job market signalling model, where the job applicant signals their quality by declaring a costly education. In Grafen's model, the courting male's quality is signalled by investment in an extravagant trait—similar to the peacock's tail. The signal is reliable if the marginal cost to the signaller is proportionately lower for higher-quality signallers than for lower-quality ones: the cost can be lower or the benefit higher, or both.

A series of papers by the American biologist Thomas Getty showed that Grafen's proof of the handicap principle depends on the critical, simplifying assumption that signallers trade off costs for benefits in an additive fashion, analogous to the way humans invest money to increase income in the same currency. This is illustrated in the figures from Johnstone 1997, which show that the optimum signalling levels are different for low- and high-quality signallers. The validity of the assumption that costs and benefits are additive has been contested, in its application to the evolution of sexually selected signals. It can be reasoned that since fitness depends on the production of offspring, this is a multiplicative rather than additive function of reproductive success.

Further game theoretical models demonstrated the evolutionary stability of handicapped signals in nestlings' begging calls, in predator-deterrent signals and in threat-displays. In the classic handicap models of begging in game theory, all players are assumed to pay the same amount to produce a signal of a given level of intensity, but differ in the relative value of eliciting the desired response (donation) from the receiver. The hungrier the baby bird, the more food is of value to it, and the higher the optimal signalling level (the louder its chirping).

=== Cheap talk models without handicaps ===
Counter-examples to handicap models predate handicap models themselves. Models of signals (such as threat displays) without any handicapping costs show that what biologists call cheap talk may be an evolutionarily stable form of communication. Analysis of some begging models shows that non-communication strategies are not only evolutionarily stable, but lead to higher payoffs for both players. In human mate choice, mathematical analyses including Monte Carlo simulations suggest that costly traits ought to be more attractive to the other sex and much rarer than non-costly traits.

It was soon discovered that honest signals need not be costly at the honest equilibrium, even under conflict of interest. This conclusion was first shown in discrete models and then in continuous models. Similar results were obtained in conflict models: threat displays need not be handicaps to be honest and evolutionarily stable.

=== Unworkable theory lacking empirical evidence ===
In 2015, Simon Huttegger and colleagues wrote that the distinction between "indexes" (unfakable signals) and "fakable signals", crucial to the argument for the handicap principle, is an artefact of signalling models. They demonstrated that absent that dichotomy, cost could not be the only factor controlling signalling behaviours, and that indeed it was "probably not the most important" factor acting against deception.

Dustin J. Penn and Szabolcs Számadó stated in 2019 that there was still no empirical evidence for evolutionary pressure for wasteful biology or acts, and proposed that the handicap principle should be abandoned.

== Predictions and interpretations ==
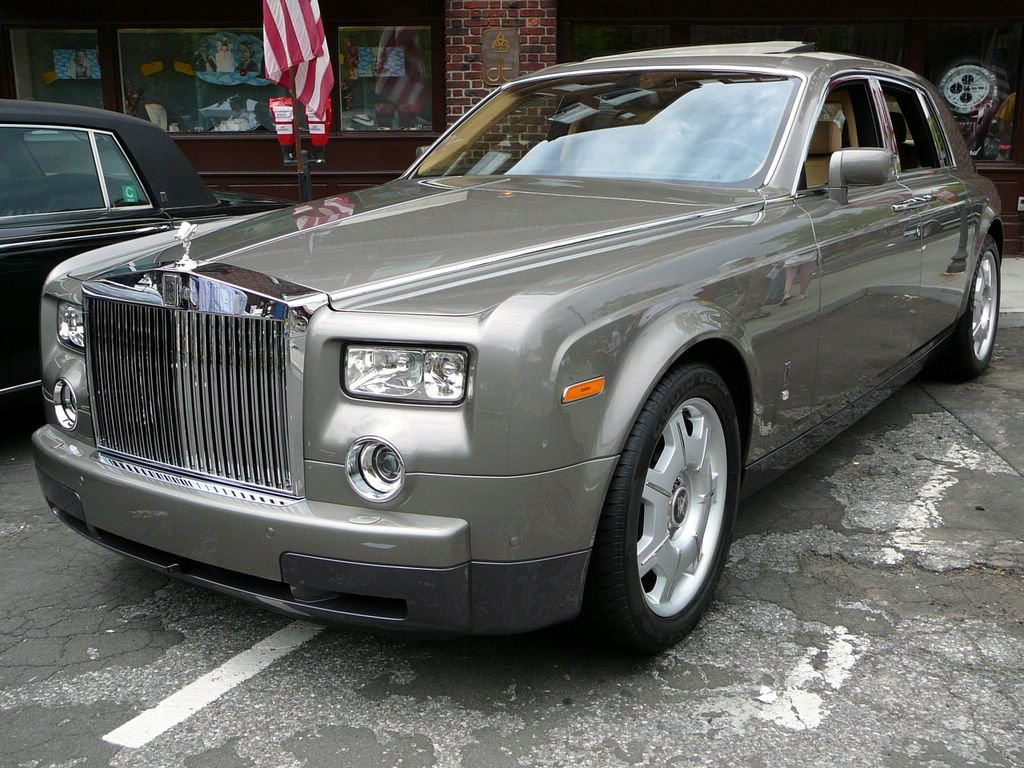
Luxury cars and other "Veblen goods" may be an example of the handicap principle in humans.

The handicap principle predicts that a sexual ornament, or any other signal such as visibly risky behaviour, must be costly if it is to accurately advertise a trait of relevance to an individual with conflicting interests. Typical examples of handicapped signals include bird songs, the peacock's tail, courtship dances, and bowerbird bowers. American scientist Jared Diamond has proposed that certain risky human behaviours, such as bungee jumping, may be expressions of instincts that have evolved through the operation of the handicap principle. Zahavi has invoked the gift-giving potlatch ceremony as a human example of the handicap principle in action: the conspicuous generosity is costly. This interpretation of potlatch can be traced to Thorstein Veblen's use of the ceremony in his book Theory of the Leisure Class as an example of "conspicuous consumption".

The handicap principle gains further support by providing interpretations for behaviours that fit into a single unifying gene-centered view of evolution and making earlier explanations based on group selection obsolete. A classic example is that of stotting in gazelles. This behaviour consists in the gazelle initially running slowly and jumping high when threatened by a predator such as a lion or cheetah. The explanation based on group selection was that such behaviour might be adapted to alerting other gazelle to a cheetah's presence or might be part of a collective behaviour pattern of the group of gazelle to confuse the cheetah. Instead, Zahavi proposed that each gazelle was communicating that it was a fitter individual than its fellows.

=== Signals to members of the same species ===
Zahavi studied in particular the Arabian babbler, a highly social bird, with a life-length of 30 years, which appears to behave altruistically. Its helping-at-the-nest behaviour, where non-parent birds assist in feeding, guarding, and caring for nestlings, often occurs among unrelated individuals. This, therefore, cannot be explained by kin selection, natural selection acting on genes that close relatives share with the altruistic individual. Zahavi reinterpreted these behaviours according to his signalling theory and its correlative, the handicap principle. The altruistic act is costly to the donor, but may improve its attractiveness to potential mates. The evolution of this condition may be explained by competitive altruism.

French biologist Patrice David showed that in the stalk-eyed fly species Cyrtodiopsis dalmanni, genetic variation underlies the response to environmental stress, such as variable food quality, of a male sexual ornament, eye span. He showed that some male genotypes always develop large eye spans, but others reduce eye span in proportion to environmental worsening. David inferred that female mate choice yields genetic benefits for offspring.

=== Signals to other species ===
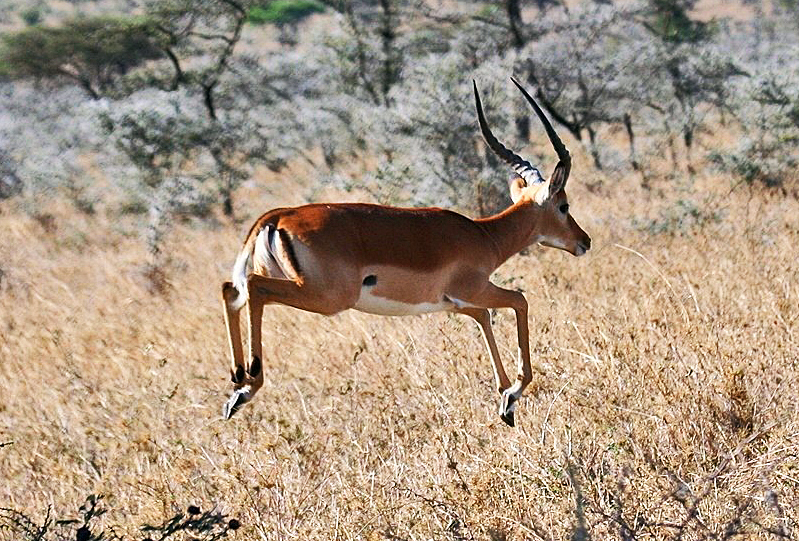
Impala stotting, a behaviour that may serve as a pursuit deterrence signal to predators

Signals may be directed at predators, with the function of showing that pursuit will probably be unprofitable. Stotting, for instance, is a form of energetic jumping that certain gazelles do when they sight a predator. As this offers no evident benefit and would seem to waste resources (diminishing the gazelle's head start if chased by the predator), it appeared likely to be selected against. However, it made sense when seen as a pursuit deterrence signal to predators. By investing a little energy to show a lion that it has the fitness necessary to avoid capture, a gazelle reduces the likelihood that it will have to evade the lion in an actual pursuit. The lion, faced with the demonstration of fitness, might decide that it would fail to catch this gazelle, and thus choose to avoid a probably wasted pursuit. The benefit to the gazelle is twofold. First, for the small amount of energy invested in the stotting, the gazelle might not have to expend the tremendous energy required to evade the lion. Second, if the lion is in fact capable of catching this gazelle, the gazelle's bluff may lead to its survival that day (in the event the bluff succeeds). However, the mathematical biologist John Maynard Smith commented that other explanations were possible, such as that it was an honest signal of fitness, or an honest signal that the predator had been detected, and it was hard to see how stotting could be a handicap.

Another example is provided by larks, some of which discourage merlins by sending a similar message: they sing while being chased, telling their predator that they will be difficult to capture.

=== Immunocompetence handicaps ===
The theory of immunocompetence handicaps suggests that androgen-mediated traits accurately signal condition due to the immunosuppressive effects of androgens. This immunosuppression may be either because testosterone alters the allocation of limited resources between the development of ornamental traits and other tissues, including the immune system, or because heightened immune system activity has a propensity to launch autoimmune attacks against gametes, such that suppression of the immune system enhances fertility. Healthy individuals can afford to suppress their immune system by raising their testosterone levels, at the same time augmenting secondary sexual traits and displays. A review of empirical studies into the various aspects of this theory found weak support.

== See also ==
- Aposematism
- Costly signaling theory in evolutionary psychology
- Fisherian runaway
- Multiple sexual ornaments
- Parasite-stress theory
- Sacrifice
