= Costly signaling theory in evolutionary psychology =

Behavioral theory

Costly signaling theory in evolutionary psychology refers to uses of costly signaling theory and adaptationism in explanations for psychological traits and states. Often informed by the closely related fields of human behavioral ecology and cultural evolution, such explanations are predominantly focused on humans and emphasize the benefits of altering the perceptions of others. They also stress the need to do so in ways that are difficult to fake, due to the widespread existence of adaptations which demand reliable information to avoid manipulation through dishonest signals.

Although initially created to explain costly morphological traits as honest signals of an individual's underlying quality resulting from sexual selection, the scope of costly signaling theory has been expanded to include signals of cooperative intent and need, with the targets of such signals often going beyond potential mates.

== Costly signaling background ==
Almost any organism can benefit from altering the perceptions, behavior, and physiology of others in its environment in ways that favor itself. Particularly true in social species, the result is often investment in signals to enhance one's perceived attractiveness, formidability, or cooperative value to members of their own species.

A signal differs from a cue in that signals evolved to influence the behavior or perceptions of others, while a cue is any piece of information an organism uses to alter its current state that was not created for this purpose. As signals evolve due to their communicative effects and are often not fully linked to the qualities being signaled, they have the potential to be easily faked by those who do not possess a trait. Such faking would likely be favored through natural selection due to the ubiquity of conflicts of interests among living things. These conflicts create situations in which the negative impacts on others are either not relevant, or still worth the benefits to the signaler.

Although there are substantial risks of being deceived, targets of a signal may still benefit from paying attention to this information as long as it is honest and relevant to fitness-related problems. For this reason, natural selection is thought to have resulted in adaptations in many species to verify the validity of signals before accepting the information as reliable. Signaling in a costly manner is thought to satisfy these anti-manipulation adaptations when the resultant signals are comparatively cheaper to produce for those who have the underlying quality compared to those who lack it. In these instances, individuals with the quality can maximize their fitness by investing more in the signal relative to those who lack the quality or possess it to a lesser degree, thereby resulting in a signal that, while often not impossible to fake, tends to not be worth faking.

== Costly signals of beneficial qualities ==
The majority of costly signaling explanations involve behaviors that broadcast beneficial traits about oneself to others. In many instances, these signals are expected to be directed towards potential mates, with males often thought to benefit more from such signaling due to their relatively low levels of investment in offspring leading to greater fitness benefits in having multiple partners. However, the importance of cooperation over human evolutionary history is also thought to have resulted in many signals that involve showing one's potential as a cooperative partner to those outside of mates.

=== Costly signals of embodied capital ===
==== Hunting ====
Primarily through the work of human behavioral ecologists, hunting among humans has received much attention as potentially serving as an honest indicator of various qualities due to its potential for differential costs. The first signaling approaches to hunting emphasized that although hunting can provide an important source of calories and nutrients in small-scale societies, it is still practiced when it is less efficient than other means of food production and often involves the targeting of species that result in less meat for a given period. In response to this and findings that food is typically shared widely in small-scale societies, the show-off hypothesis suggests that men may hunt difficult prey in part due to reputational benefits that increase the likelihood that others will want good hunters in their group because of the benefits they provide.

Later models built off this by incorporating costly signaling theory. In addition to the costs of inefficiency reported in some hunts, hunting can be costly in terms of the time needed to develop one's skill, the risks involved, and the resources required for a successful hunt. For this reason, it has been proposed to honestly signal a wide range of traits including strength, skill, ability to buffer risk, leadership, and various beneficial cognitive traits, all of which can increase one's attractiveness to mates and cooperative partners. As with other costly signals, this is due to hunting being relatively more costly for those who lack the previously mentioned qualities or possess them to a lesser degree, with such individuals being more likely to produce less effective signals and become injured, both of which deter faking the signal.

Although not mutually exclusive with the show-off hypothesis, such approaches have been presented as explaining a wider range of hunting behaviors as the benefits that come with signaling one's qualities does not require that hunting benefits others, thereby better accounting for relatively wasteful displays. However, these models still emphasize the benefits of providing for others as meat sharing is often public and attracts large audiences, thereby increasing the effectiveness of a signal to increase one's status within a group.

Evidence in favor of hunting being a costly signal of beneficial qualities has primarily come from its valuation by group members and by the benefits good hunters enjoy. In small-scale societies, individuals can often tell a good hunter from a bad one, with skilled hunters having been reported as having higher status than those less skilled. Material benefits are also seen with good hunters having been shown to have increased reproductive success, more political power, and more support for one's kin in both times of illness and health.

Compared to the existence of the reputational benefits of hunting, its importance in explaining human hunting relative to explanations involving kin selection or reciprocity is more controversial. This is primarily seen through disagreement on the amount of provisioning that happens within a family and the general ability of hunters to control who receives the meat they bring in.

==== Risk-taking ====
Often invoked in costly signaling approaches to hunting, risk-taking has been suggested to result in honest signals of quality in other forms. As risk increases, so do the costs that come with failure. This results in greater costs for those who do not have qualities which allow for greater chances of success or the ability to buffer failure relative to those who possess such qualities. For this reason, risky behaviors may often be honest signals, with individuals who lack the relevant traits being expected to avoid risk or suffer too much damage from failures to maintain risky behavior.

Many beneficial qualities have been suggested to underlie risk-taking behavior. For example, physical skill, good judgment, or bravery have all been argued to increase the chances of success in risky situations. Similarly, social dominance, confidence, and ambition may also help in competition among conspecifics, with social dominance, ambition, and wealth also potentially limiting the costs of failure.

In general, the targets of risky signals are often thought to be potential mates. This is primarily due to the finding that young males (who are the age and sex class with the highest reproductive variance) take more risks than any other group in both experiments and observational data. By undertaking risky endeavors, males are thought to signal the previously mentioned qualities which may be directly related to one's ability to provision and protect one's family. However, traits like bravery and physical prowess may also be valued by cooperative partners due to their benefits in group-hunting and warfare, thereby increasing the potential audience for risk takers.

==== Physical attractiveness ====
Physically attractive traits have also been hypothesized to be signals of mate quality, with facial characteristics, body type, voice characteristics, and body modification having all been suggested to provide information relevant to reproduction. However, most approaches focus on how the information is relevant to the receiver rather than whether the information takes the form of signals or cues, with the two possibilities often hard to distinguish between.

Although exceptions exist, costly signaling theory has mainly been incorporated into explanations for attractive male traits in a wide range of species. In humans, both low voice pitch and facial masculinity in males have been suggested to be honest indicators of male quality due to testosterone's connection to facial and vocal cord development and its hypothesized role in mediating tradeoffs. From such perspectives, only high-quality males can afford to invest heavily in phenotypic qualities outside those needed for survival due to lower relative costs of such investment, with testosterone's linking of these traits with facial and vocal characteristics preventing individuals from faking these signals. Additionally, low voice pitch may also be difficult to fake in the short-term due to activation of the autonomic nervous system, which controls fight-or-flight responses, altering voice pitch. For this reason, only individuals who are confident in their ability are likely ability can afford to maintain low levels of arousal, thereby potentially serving as an honest signal of formidability.

Regardless of whether the information comes from cues or signals, differences are expected in which information is valued by each sex. In general females are expected to be more sensitive to information about the ability of potential mates to acquire and defend resources, while males are expected to focus more on potential partners' ability to conceive and take care of future children. Outside of these areas, both sexes are often suggested to benefit similarly in signaling pathogen resistance or a lack of harmful mutations due to their hypothesized importance over human evolutionary history.

==== Art ====
Art has also received attention as a costly signal of beneficial qualities relevant to sexual selection. If defined as environmental modification lacking adaptive functions outside of sexual selection, art or art-like behavior has been observed in spiders, crabs, fish, and birds in addition to humans. Unlike the art of other species, however, the form of human art is generally not considered to be genetically encoded. Instead, adaptationist approaches often involve the hypothesis that humans possess adaptations capable of resulting in a wide range of artwork as sexual signals and adaptations for correctly evaluating the information being signaled.

The costs of producing art are expected to increase with the quality of the piece and come in multiple forms. Creating art can require substantial amounts of time to learn the skills involved, find materials, and produce the work, all of which can prevent the individual from investing in other fitness enhancing tasks. The materials involved may also require substantial resources to obtain and production itself may be physically demanding or risky. Once created, works of art may also require defense against theft or sabotage from potential rivals.

Since these costs are relatively less impactful for those in good condition, producing art is thought to be an honest signal of one's quality, with those in good condition being able to afford greater investment in art. For this reason, it may reliably signal information about one's health, access to resources, or the relative absence of harmful mutations which might negatively impact one's ability or overall condition. In instances where art needs to be defended, it may also signal one's formidability and social power.

As a hypothesized form of sexual signaling, males are expected to benefit from using art to signal to larger audiences than females, with evidence of this seen in both humans and non-human animals. However, in humans, the potential for sex differences has been argued to not extend to artistic ability due to the commonality of long-term monogamous relationships resulting in the increased importance of mutual mate choice, something which favors females to invest more in sexual signals relative to other species.

Evidence consistent with art often involving sexual signals in humans primarily comes from studies examining mate preferences. For example, a study examining mating preferences in thirty-seven cultures found that being "creative and artistic" was the sixth most important trait to females and the seventh most important trait to males out of thirteen qualities regarded as attractive. Additionally, greater effort towards the creation of public art has been associated with higher numbers of sexual partners among populations of both young adults and artists.

==== Courtship duration ====
Lengthy courtships have also been proposed to honestly signal one's overall quality, particularly in non-human animals. Although often accompanied by other signals, courtship duration on its own can create substantial opportunity costs as males cannot court other females at this time or invest in other fitness enhancing activities. For this reason, it may be an honest signal of overall quality due to the expectation that low-quality males will suffer more from opportunity costs per unit of time in courtship than high quality males, thereby favoring low quality males to drop out courtship sooner.

In humans, willingness to engage in lengthy courtships has also been suggested to signal desire for a long-term relationship as opposed to casual sex, with there being evidence that persistent courtship styles are more attractive for females seeking long-term relationships than those seeking shorter-term relationships.

==== Infant crying as a signal of vigor ====
In addition to potentially signaling need or being a means to manipulate parents, crying in human infants has been suggested to serve as a costly signal meant to decrease the child's risk of infanticide, something which is seen across cultures.

Due to the fact that conflicts of interests exist between an offspring and both its parents and siblings, parents are expected to be sensitive to the quality of their offspring in determining how much investment to provide. As parental investment in one offspring cannot go to another, the potential exists for investment in a new child to reduce an individual's fitness. This can happen when an offspring is unlikely to survive, thereby favoring investment in other areas. Additionally, such investment may still be costly with high likelihoods of survival if it puts the well-being of other siblings at risk. In these situations, older siblings are expected to be favored due to being closer to reproduction and the fact that they have already survived infancy which has higher mortality rates than later childhood.

Crying is proposed to help reduce one's infanticide risk by establishing the perception of vigor in others. This is primarily thought to be possible due to the energy costs of crying making it costlier for infants in worse condition. For this reason, it may serve as a reliable indicator of what an infant can afford to spend, thereby making it an honest signal of quality. Additionally, the acoustic frequency of one's cries may also carry information about one's fitness prospects based on studies which have found correlations between cry pitch and various diseases.

Such an approach has been extended to the excessive crying of colic. However, crying's connection to need has also been suggested to result in excessive crying being more likely to lead to reduced investment by making offspring appear in worse of condition.

==== Academic publishing ====
Although not necessarily a signal of the author's qualities, the costs involved with academic publishing have been suggested to result in honest signaling about the quality of the journal article being submitted under certain conditions.

Academic publishing involves conflicts of interests between authors and journals, with authors benefiting from having articles accepted in high prestige journals regardless of quality and journals benefiting from publishing only articles that meet their standards. When the submission process involves little cost and no differential benefits, the optimal strategy for authors is likely to involve signaling that one's work is higher quality than it is and submitting all publications to high-impact journals before submitting them to lower-impact journals, even when the probability of acceptance is low.

One way for honest signaling to arise in academic publishing is if the costs involved differ based on the quality of the paper. This is possible when submitting a low-quality paper to a high impact journal results in a lengthier peer review process, requires greater time to give the paper the appearance of being higher quality, or necessitates payments for resubmission. As these costs are experienced to a greater degree when submitting low-quality papers, their existence may favor honest communication and submission to journals that match the quality of the paper.

=== Costly signals of cooperative intent ===
Outside of mating contexts in which there is little to gain through the provisioning or care of offspring, a signal of one's high quality may often not be enough to result in beneficial treatment from others, even when it is honest. Instead, individuals are also expected to pay attention to the likelihood that they will receive benefits before cooperating with another individual. This makes signaling one's willingness to provide benefits to others an important part of establishing cooperative relationships, something which is seen in both observational and experimental studies which have found that individuals tend to prefer those who are generous but have less to give as cooperative partners than those who have the ability to provide benefits but often do not.

==== Public displays of generosity ====
Costly signaling has often been used in attempts to explain instances of public generosity in which individuals incur costs without any immediate benefits. Although often thought to signal one's ability to provide benefits, such behaviors have also been considered as honest signals of one's willingness to cooperate due to the costs involved.

===== Food sharing =====
Food sharing is often reported to be a common occurrence in many small-scale societies, particularly with hunted game. Non-signaling explanations for this have focused on either the benefits of establishing reciprocal relationships with others to buffer risk or the limited benefits of maintaining control over food, due to either the effort required or spoilage in large game. However, neither may be mutually exclusive with signaling strategies due to the importance of reputation to cooperative relationships and the fact that sharing food that may not be worth defending still requires the effort to collect in the first place.

Due to its link to food production, food sharing may signal the qualities of the provider in instances when obtaining food results in differential costs based on one's underlying traits. As with other signals of cooperative intent, it may also signal one's generosity, as such sharing is costlier for those who are likely to defect rather than gain from long-term cooperative relationships.

When seen as a signal of generosity, the type of information signaled is likely to depend on the form of sharing and who receives what. Sharing widely may signal one's intentions of future cooperation with one's group, while more targeted examples constrained to only a subset of one's group can signal interest in forming cooperative relationships with individuals or coalitions within a group. Sharing may also be an effective signal of generosity to those not receiving benefits if it reflects a stable personality trait that varies among individuals.

====== Competitive feasting ======
Compared to the day to day sharing seen in small-scale societies, the staging of large feasts in which those holding them pay the majority of the costs may also demonstrate cooperative intent, with such practices being found among diverse groups. However, the fact that feasts tend to only happen at particular times of the year and involve competition between groups has been used to suggest that they may primarily be forms of conspicuous consumption meant to signal one's overall quality or status.

===== Blood donations =====
Costly signaling has also been suggested to explain blood donations. In the most common form, individuals give blood voluntary, while receiving no payment and having no control over who gets the donation. This results in a lack of obvious benefits for the donator who also incurs opportunity costs and the risk of mistakes and other negative outcomes, the threat of which may cause anxiety and other forms of psychological distress.

Unlike explanations involving direct reciprocity and kin selection which are suggested to be irrelevant to blood donations due to the lack of control over who receives the blood, signaling explanations allow for benefits to come from one's ability to alter the perceptions of others in ways that benefit the signaler. This is proposed to involve increased perceptions of generosity and willingness to take risks in addition to providing reliable information about one's health due to individuals with certain health conditions or diseases not being allowed to donate blood.

===== Indirect reciprocity =====
Costly signaling may also be involved in many forms of indirect reciprocity. Indirect reciprocity occurs when one's seemingly altruistic acts increase one's reputation for cooperation, making others more likely to help regardless of if they were the target of the act. Based on game theoretic models, this can evolve in the absence of signaling through fixed strategies. However, in species with the flexibility to alter their level of cooperation in response to their own state and relevant social variables, past behaviors with others may not be enough on their own to reliably signal cooperative intent without the inclusion of other means to ensure the honesty of the signal. When this is the case and a species has the ability to both determine the likelihood others will cooperate and signal their own cooperative intent, costly signaling may be an important mechanism behind indirect reciprocity.

In humans, this has been proposed to take the form of individuals identifying potential targets of signals through the maintenance of welfare-tradeoff ratios and then employing costly signals to increase one's perceived value as a cooperator to attractive targets for cooperation in the future.

==== Dyadic gift giving ====
Costly signals have also been suggested to be important for demonstrating commitment to both initiate and maintain dyadic relationships, with gift giving in particular receiving substantial attention as an individual strategy and as a custom.

Such approaches emphasize that the risk of defection from potential friends and romantic partners is particularly high at the start of relationships due to the amount of private information individuals have about their intentions to cooperate. Gifts are thought to help with this when the costs involved are large enough to not be worth providing by someone who does not value the potential for a long-term relationship. As the costs of the gift are thought to result in a reliable signal, almost any form of gift could signal future cooperative intent. However, gifts that do not increase the receiver's fitness prospects may be favored, as those that result in material benefits for the receiver are likely to increase the risk of being manipulated by others. Similarly, the fact that gifts are often personalized, sex specific, or involve goods that degrade quickly has been suggested to reduce the likelihood that the receiver can benefit from regifting the item with other partners, thereby further reducing the risk of defection.

As a relationship develops, some models emphasize that the costs involved with gift giving should increase to signal greater levels of commitment. Assuming one's partner reciprocates along the way, this is expected to result in costs that are greater than what would be expected from with a large favor when one is likely to be in need, the time when developed friendships are most vulnerable to defection.

Although the focus is often on signaling one's desire for a long-term relationship, it is likely not the only quality being signaled. Instead, one's ability to acquire resources may also be demonstrated in larger gifts. Additionally, individuals may also demonstrate one's thoughtfulness and attentiveness to a partner by matching the gift to his or her preferences, something which has been proposed to be very difficult to fake.

Assuming other individuals in a population behave similarly, gift giving may also reduce the benefits of defection by making it costly to start new relationships, something which may be particularly likely when gift giving is largely dictated by customs that are inherently costly for those without the intent of future cooperation.

==== Ritual ====
Costly signaling approaches to ritual often emphasize the ability of ritual behavior to honestly signal commitment to one's group due to the costs involved resulting in signals that are difficult to fake.

Religious rituals have received the most attention as potential costly signals. Like other forms of ritual, the costs involved come from the time, energy, material goods, or physical harm required for one to fit the ritual's prescriptions, with extreme forms of self-harm not being uncommon. Although the costs of the ritual itself are likely to be equal among believers and nonbelievers, skeptics have been suggested to perceive rituals as more costly due to them not believing in the power of the ritual to achieve what believers expect of it. This difference in perception makes it less likely an individual will find belief worth faking, with costlier practices expected to provide greater indications of one's commitment. Additionally, the commonality that religious rituals are often complex means that mistakes may be easy to spot throughout the ritual, further decreasing the likelihood of someone faking their commitment.

Evidence consistent with costly signaling explanations for religious ritual comes from both experimental and observational studies; however, few examinations exist on the topic. For example, members of religious kibbutzes have been shown to be more cooperative compared to secular kibbutzes in a common-pool resource game. Similarly, those engaging in communal religious rituals have been shown to have larger cooperative networks than those who did not participate. Other studies have attempted to more directly link the costs of signals to the effectiveness of cooperation, with one finding the number of costly requirements of a commune to be associated with longer commune lifespan and another finding that participation in and observation of a costly ritual was associated with larger donations compared to those involved with a less costly ritual.

==== Apology ====
In addition to attempts at creating cooperative relationships, the costly signaling model of apology suggests that costly signals may also be used as a way to restore cooperation after a transgression. Since the costs of honest and dishonest verbal apologies are identical for the individual apologizing and the costs of continued victimization may be severe for the target of the apology, it is unlikely that verbal apologies alone will often be enough to convey contrition. For this reason, costs may be an adaptive part of an apology, increasing the effectiveness of the apology so that the apologizer is more likely to remain in the cooperative venture.

For an apology to be effective, the model does not require costs to be tied to harm caused by the transgression. Instead, the signal only needs to be costly enough to outweigh the benefits a defector could gain in a one-time interaction, thereby creating a situation in which only those who are interested in future cooperation gain net benefits from the signal.

As honesty is established through costs, apologies consistent with the model can take many forms, with financial loss, self-harm, and the reduction of one's status have all been documented to be associated with apologies to both other individuals and religious deities. Apologies may also include gifts or other benefits; however, the benefits themselves are not predicted to increase the honesty of the signal. Instead, they may simply be one way for the signaler to incur costs.

In addition to less costly forms, non-lethal suicide attempts have also been suggested to serve as honest apologies in some instances. Unlike other forms of costs, the costs of a suicide attempt primarily come from the probability of one's death, with riskier attempts being seen as costlier. According to the costly apology model of suicide, such substantial costs may be required to honestly signal contrition when the potential payoff to future defection is large enough to still allow for deceivers to gain net benefits through less costly signals, something which may occur when highly valuable cooperative relationships are in threat of being ended. Suicide attempts may also increase the spread of the information from the signal due to their noteworthy nature, something which may be particularly important when the transgression was made against a group or puts cooperative relationships with those outside the aggrieved at risk.

Evidence for the costly signaling model of apology has mainly come from experiments. For example, multiple vignette studies have found that costly apologies increase the perception of sincerity by the target of the signal across different countries and religions, with the costs of gift giving and self-punishment both being effective. Similarly, participants in a study that had them imagine an accidental transgression in the past were more likely to report willingness to engage in a costly apology when an individual was more likely to be important to them. However, costly self-punishment was common in a study which forced participants to accidentally treat an anonymous partner unfairly, something which is consistent with the idea that apologies may also serve to maintain one's reputation to a larger audience.

==== Infant-directed song ====
Infant-directed song has been suggested to be a costly signal of parental attentiveness, something which is thought to be particularly important when infants are too young to walk or correctly avoid dangers in their environment.

Although parents experience fitness benefits from providing attention to infants and infants can gain fitness benefits from their parents spending time in other tasks, the optimal amount of resources devoted to this is expected to be an example of parent-offspring conflict, with infants benefiting from more attention than what is ideal for the parent. Due to this conflict of interest, infants are expected to be sensitive to information relating to parental attention and come equipped with adaptations help elicit it, something which is proposed to result in selection pressures on parents to better signal their attententiveness.

Infant-directed song is thought to help with this due to its production being costlier to make when the parent is focused on other aspects of its environment, thereby increasing the honesty of the signal. According to this hypothesis, the potential costs of infant-directed song can come in multiple non-exclusive forms. For example, singing may require investment in both planning and memory, while also potentially requiring the parent to attend to the infant's emotional state and alter the song to match. It may also prevent one from doing physically demanding activities in instances that require specific breathing patterns.

Whatever form the costs take, the benefit to the parent is suggested to be quicker and more reliable satiation of infant demands which would then allow greater for investment in other areas.

=== Costly signals of wealth ===
As wealth influences one's access to resources directly and by increasing the status of those who possess it, demonstrations of wealth have been hypothesized to have substantial benefits and often take the form of costly signals. Although wealth alone may be worth signaling, such signals are often suggested to display information about qualities relating to one's ability to acquire and defend resources in the future. They may also signal generosity when this involves a charitable component; however, this benefit is often considered secondary.

==== Conspicuous consumption ====
One potential means for signaling wealth is conspicuous consumption. Conspicuous consumption refers to instances when individuals purchase luxury goods which provide little to no utility over less costly versions, thereby prioritizing self-presentation over economic efficiency. It is common across humans regardless of class and often involves strategic planning to maximize the audience of the display and the strength of the signal.

Most signaling explanations of conspicuous consumption predict the targets of the signal will predominately be potential mates. As with other signals relating to sexual selection, males are typically expected to invest more in these signals due to the potential for greater benefits through additional matings. In these instances, the information signaled is thought to go beyond genetic quality and signal the potential for investment, which can be attractive to those seeking both long-term and short-term mating strategies. Although often focused on males, females have also been suggested to benefit from conspicuous consumption in mating contexts due to its hypothesized ability to demonstrate the commitment of one's partner and signal one's mate quality to rivals, both of which may help in intrasexual competition and deter mate poaching.

Despite the focus on sexual selection, conspicuous consumption may also be useful for problems outside of acquiring mates. This can involve attempts at attracting other cooperative partners, who stand to gain from the signalers ability to confer benefits should they form an alliance. As in mating contexts, there may also be benefits to intimidating rivals, thereby decreasing the likelihood of direct competition for resources in the future.

Evidence consistent with conspicuous consumption being a costly signal of wealth and status comes from primarily from findings that females find males with more expensive items more desirable. This is mainly seen in experiments which have manipulated the costs of items associated with males, with cars and clothing typical of higher classes having been found to be associated with increased probabilities of females entering into various types of romantic and sexual relationships and greater perceptions of attractiveness across multiple studies.

Outside of its benefits, there has been much less research on whether conspicuous consumption meets the other requirements of being a signal, with it being possible that a mismatch exists between hypothesized adaptations for status signaling and modern environments which include marketing campaigns that might exploit such adaptations. However, its commonality across cultures and class boundaries have been used to argue that humans may be well suited to balancing the costs and benefits of the signal.

==== Public philanthropy ====
Extravagant charitable donations have also been suggested to honestly signal one's wealth due to large donations being impossible or costlier to make for those with fewer resources. As with conspicuous consumption, such signals are also often expected to provide information about one's underlying quality in addition to wealth, particularly relating to one's ability to acquire and maintain possession of resources.

Due to the qualities signaled and their public nature, public philanthropy has been suggested to mainly serve to attract new cooperators. For this reason, existing cooperators may view such signals as threats to their ongoing relationships, and put more weight on private signals to evaluate the cooperative intent of the signaler. Consistent with this reasoning, public displays of generosity may often decrease one's perceptions of cooperativeness or trustworthiness when they appear to be strategies meant to gain recognition or prestige.

== Costly signals of need ==
In addition to signaling qualities meant to increase one's attractiveness to potential mates or other cooperative partners, costly signals have also been suggested to result in honest displays of need. Primarily aimed at existing cooperators who would be motivated to help given genuine need on the part of the signaler, such signals are hypothesized to reduce doubt surrounding the severity of one's situation in ways less costly signals could not.

=== Depression ===
Due in part to its costs, prevalence, and apparent ability for anyone to develop it, major depression has been hypothesized to often serve as a credible signal of need. The bargaining model of depression suggests that throughout our evolutionary history individuals would have often faced instances of social adversity (e.g., abuse, the death of an important figure in one's life, or the end of a romantic relationship) in which their fitness prospects depended primarily on responses from others. In these situations, providing social support could result in benefits for individuals who gain from cooperating with the depressed individual or otherwise benefit from their success. However, the costs involved with providing help and the threat of manipulation require reliable information before sufficient help is likely to be provided.

As with the other proposed costly signals, depression is proposed to achieve this due to the costs involved making the signal prohibitively costly to fake for those who are not in severe enough need. The costs of major depression primarily come through the reduction of interest and investment in one's normal pattern of behavior. Although highly costly to those who are not in need, this does not require substantial costs on the part of an honest signaler. Instead, instances of severe enough adversity can result in a situation in which there is no difference in one's fitness prospects in being depressed or not, with the costs still being substantial for those not actually in enough need.

In addition to serving as an honest signal of need, the bargaining model also emphasizes depression's potential role as a bargaining tool. This is possible due to the reduction in behavior that often accompanies depression reducing the benefits the depressed individual provides to others. For this reason, many instances of depression are predicted to be analogous to a labor strike in that individuals who previously benefited from the depressed individual receive the message that they need to upregulate their support to once again gain from his or her cooperation.

=== Illness symptoms ===
Various types of conspicuous illness symptoms have also been suggested to serve as honest signals of need. Although much of one's illness symptoms are likely to come in the form of cues resulting from one's susceptibilities to a pathogen or byproducts of one's defenses against it, such approaches suggest they may also be upregulated in order to better signal need. As symptoms may be costly in terms of energy, opportunity costs, and reputation, it is expected to be costlier for potential fakers than those who are actually ill and experiencing symptoms already. For this reason, potential fakers are not expected to gain net fitness benefits from such displays, thus increasing the likelihood the targets of one's signal will believe the individual to be ill and provide meaningful benefits that outweigh the costs of signaling.

Formulated as an explanation for placebo responses, the signaling theory of symptoms predicts that once the signaling function of upregulated symptoms is achieved and others provide support, symptoms will then be downregulated to a level appropriate for disease fighting signaling. In line with this, evidence for the ability to alter one's symptom levels in response to the presence of conspecifics exists in many species, and placebo responses themselves tend to primarily occur after treatments an individual believe to be efficacious are given. Additionally, placebo responses are often sensitive to the demeanor and behaviors of the care provider, as would be expected with signaling approaches if care providers are seen as potential targets of the signal.

=== Crying ===
Compared to the other proposed signals of need, crying is the least controversial as having a signaling function. However, it has been argued that there is currently little evidence to distinguish it from a cue with a high degree of confidence, and relatively few signaling explanations involve the costs of crying and how this might lead to honest signaling.

==== Infant crying as a signal of need ====
The functions of crying are often thought to differ based on whether the crier is an infant or from another age class. In infants, signaling need for food, attention, and protection have been the most commonly proposed functions. As is the case with explanations of crying as a signal of vigor, the primary cost of infant crying is typically thought to be energetic, with such costs having the potential to result in a signal that is costlier to fake than produce when in honest need. This has been used to suggest that the frequency and duration of crying forms an important part of the signal; however, it has also been proposed that the costs underlying crying may also be connected to the sounds produced.

Despite the commonality of signaling explanations for infant crying, responses to infants can often be negative in addition to the positive responses predicted. In particular, negative responses to crying have been found to be associated with post-partum depression, anxiety, and high levels of neuroticism. However, not all responses are thought to be equally relevant to evaluating whether crying can be an adaptive signal, with negative emotional responses alone not being sufficient evidence of negative fitness outcomes due to the greater importance of behavioral responses.

==== Adult crying ====
Often expected to involve low costs compared to the other hypothesized costly signals of need, the potential costs of adult crying have been proposed to come from diverse areas. For example, crying has been shown to reduce one's reputation and potentially lead to avoidance in Western societies. It may also be connected to lessened immune function based on studies reporting lower levels of salivary Immunoglobulin A in adult women following tears but not sadness alone. Tear production also impedes vision, reducing one's ability to respond to threats in one's environment. However, tears may also function to hide information by increasingly the difficulty of others to determine the direction of one's gaze.

Consistent with signaling explanations, individuals have been shown to respond positively to those crying despite viewing them less favorably and experiencing more negative emotions, although negative responses are also reported. Additionally, individuals have been found to report feeling better after crying when social support is present, with crying alone tending to not improve one's mood as would be predicted with a signaling hypothesis.

== See also ==
- Alternative mating strategy
- Fisherian runaway
- Handicap principle
- Human mating strategies
- Online dating service
- Parental investment in humans
- Sociosexuality
