= Multiple sexual ornaments =

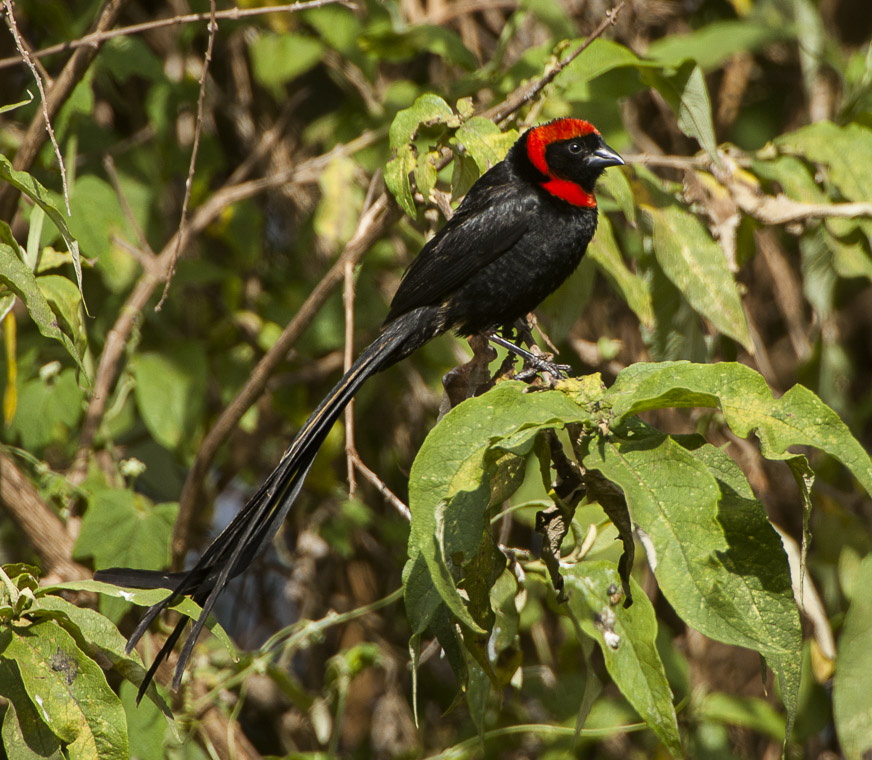
The red-cowled widowbird is one of several Euplectes species with two sexual ornaments

Many species have multiple sexual ornaments, whereby females select mating partners using several signals instead of only one. Whereas this phenomenon is self-evident and hence long recognized, adaptive explanations of why females use several signals instead of only one signal have been formulated relatively recently. Several hypotheses exist, but mutually exclusive tests are still lacking.

== Hypotheses ==
Several hypotheses attempt to explain why males have multiple sexual ornaments.

=== Multiple messages hypothesis ===
The multiple message hypothesis states that different ornaments signal different properties of an individual's overall quality. Models support the possibility that this hypothesis is evolutionarily stable but empirical tests are lacking.

Some ornaments represent long-term or short-term changes in overall condition. Elegant plumes in a bird or antlers in a deer grown once a year could signal the overall condition of an animal during the long period of growth; this is thus an example of a long-term change. Secondary characters like the inflatable bare patches of skin on a grouse species or the colorful patches of skin in a primate species could represent short-term changes.

=== Redundant signals hypothesis ===
The redundant signal hypothesis, also known as back-up signal hypothesis, states that each character can only best show partial representation of overall condition. If each ornament reflected the male's quality with a certain error, then mate choice based on a single trait would lead a female to select a male in poor condition rather than one in great condition. Thus, a female ought to look at multiple sexual traits of a male if she wants to get an overall view of the male's quality. The redundant signals hypothesis differs from the multiple messages hypothesis, as the latter predicts that different signals reflect the same aspect of mate quality, whereas the former predicts that different signals reflect different aspects. There has been some empirical support of this hypothesis. However, the majority of studies showed no correlation, suggesting the redundant signals are less common in indicating mate quality compare to other hypothesis like multiple messages hypothesis.

=== Unreliable signals hypothesis ===
The unreliable signal hypothesis suggests that some signals are unreliable indicators of overall male quality. Therefore, a female should look at multiple traits because one trait could be misleading. There is some support for this hypothesis.

=== Sexual interference hypothesis ===
The sexual interference hypothesis proposes that additional male signals evolve to hinder female mate choice by interfering with the propagation and reception of other males' sexual signals. Females respond by evolving the ability to glean meaningful information from signals despite males' attempts at obfuscation. In turn, males respond by improving their interference signals and producing new signals that are not so easily blocked. This iterative co-evolutionary process increases the costs of assessment for females and the costs of signal production for males, and leads to temporary equilibria of honest advertising via multiple signals.
