= Signalling theory =

Theory in evolutionary biology

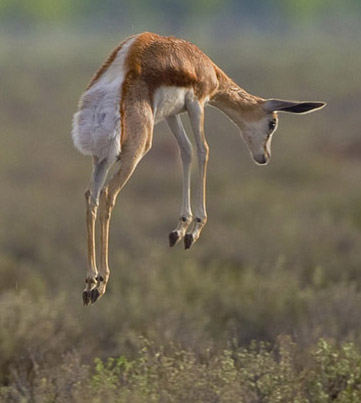
By stotting (also called pronking), a springbok (Antidorcas marsupialis) signals honestly to predators that it is young, fit, and not worth chasing.

Within evolutionary biology, signalling theory is a body of theoretical work examining communication between individuals, both within species and across species. The central question is how organisms with conflicting interests, such as in sexual selection, are expected to provide honest signals rather than deceive or cheat, given that the passing on of pleiotropic traits is subject to natural selection, which aims to minimize associated costs without assuming any conscious intent. Mathematical models describe how signalling can contribute to an evolutionarily stable strategy.

Signals are given in contexts such as mate selection by females, which subjects the advertising males' signals to selective pressure. Signals thus evolve because they modify the behaviour of the receiver to benefit the signaller. Signals may be honest, conveying information which usefully increases the fitness of the receiver, or dishonest. An individual can cheat by giving a dishonest signal, which might briefly benefit that signaller, at the risk of undermining the signalling system for the whole population.

The question of whether the selection of signals works at the level of the individual organism or gene, or at the level of the group, has been debated by biologists such as Richard Dawkins, arguing that individuals evolve to signal and to receive signals better, including resisting manipulation. Amotz Zahavi suggested that cheating could be controlled by the handicap principle, where the best horse in a handicap race is the one carrying the largest handicap weight. According to Zahavi's theory, signallers such as male peacocks have "tails" that are genuinely handicaps, being costly to produce. The system is evolutionarily stable as the large showy tails are honest signals. Biologists have attempted to verify the handicap principle, but with inconsistent results. The mathematical biologist Ronald Fisher analysed the contribution that having two copies of each gene (diploidy) would make to honest signalling, demonstrating that a runaway effect could occur in sexual selection. The evolutionary equilibrium depends sensitively on the balance of costs and benefits.

The same mechanisms can be expected in humans, where researchers have studied behaviours including risk-taking by young men, hunting of large game animals, and costly religious rituals, finding that these appear to qualify as costly honest signals.

== Sexual selection ==
When animals choose mating partners, traits such as signalling are subject to evolutionary pressure. For example, the male gray tree frog, Dryophytes versicolor, produces a call to attract females. Once a female chooses a mate, this selects for a specific style of male calling, thus propagating a specific signalling ability. The signal can be the call itself, the intensity of a call, its variation style, its repetition rate, and so on. Various hypotheses seek to explain why females would select for one call over the other. The sensory exploitation hypothesis proposes that pre-existing preferences in female receivers can drive the evolution of signal innovation in male senders, in a similar way to the hidden preference hypothesis which proposes that successful calls are better able to match some 'hidden preference' in the female. Signallers have sometimes evolved multiple sexual ornaments, and receivers have sometimes evolved multiple trait preferences.

== Honest signals ==
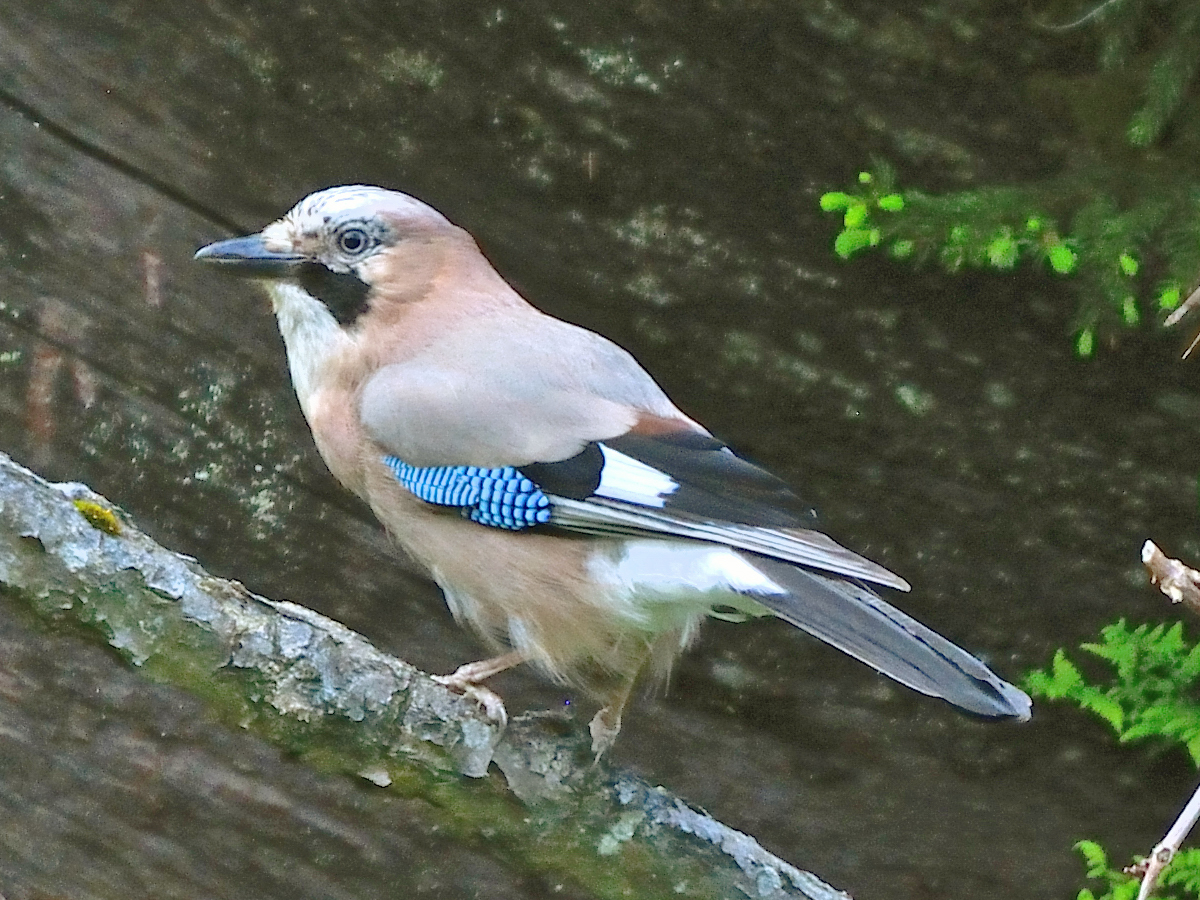
Eurasian jay, Garrulus glandarius, gives honest signals—loud alarm calls—from its tree perch when it sees a predator.

In biology, signals are traits, including structures and behaviours, that have evolved specifically because they change the behaviour of receivers in ways that benefit the signaller. Traits or actions that benefit the receiver exclusively are called "cues". For example, when an alert bird deliberately gives a warning call to a stalking predator and the predator gives up the hunt, the sound is a "signal". But when a foraging bird inadvertently makes a rustling sound in the leaves that attracts predators and increases the risk of predation, the sound is not a signal, but a cue.

Signalling systems are shaped by mutual interests between signallers and receivers. An alert bird such as a Eurasian jay warning off a stalking predator is communicating something useful to the predator: that it has been detected by the prey; it might as well quit wasting its time stalking this alerted prey, which it is unlikely to catch. When the predator gives up, the signaller can get back to other tasks such as feeding. Once the stalking predator is detected, the signalling prey and receiving predator thus have a mutual interest in terminating the hunt.

Within species, mutual interests increase with kinship. Kinship is central to models of signalling between relatives, for instance when broods of nestling birds beg and compete for food from their parents.

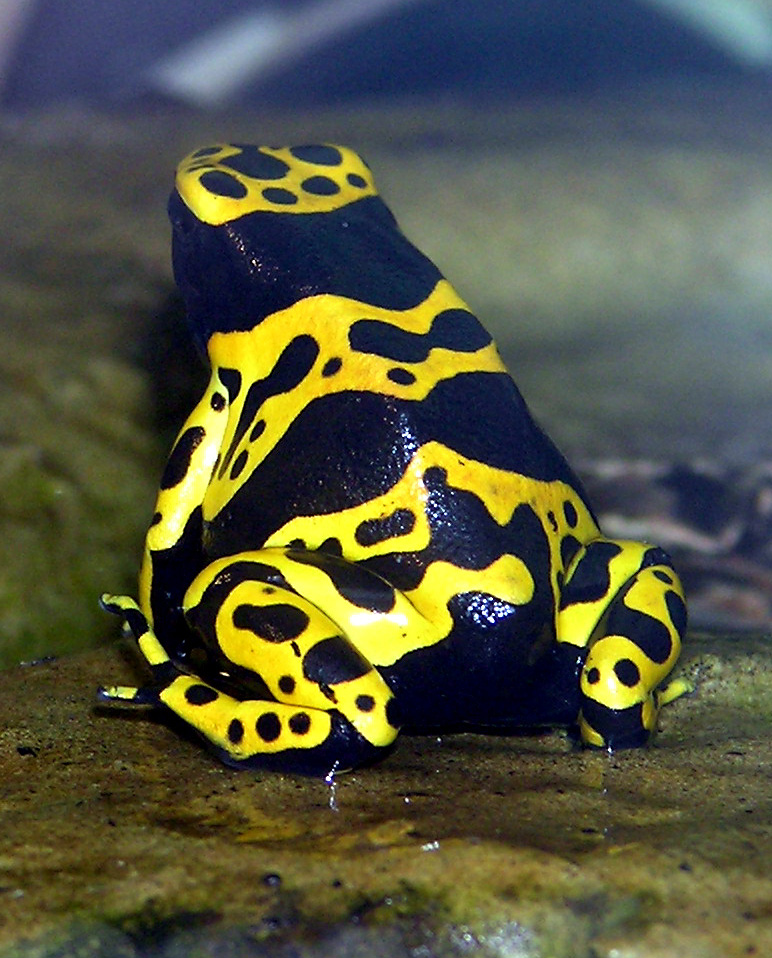
The yellow-banded poison dart frog, Dendrobates leucomelas, gives an honest signal of its toxicity to warn off predators and reduce the frog's risk of injury.

The term honesty in animal communication is controversial because in non-technical usage it implies intent, to discriminate deception from honesty in human interactions. However, biologists use the phrase "honest signals" in a direct, statistical sense. Biological signals, like warning calls or resplendent tail feathers, are honest if they reliably convey useful information to the receiver. That is, the signal trait (Note: Economists call what is available to the receiver "public information".) tells the receiver about an otherwise unobservable factor. (Note: Economists call the unobservable thing that would be of value to the receiver "private information"; biologists often call it "quality") Honest biological signals do not need to be perfectly informative, reducing uncertainty to zero; all they need to be useful is to be correct "on average", so that some behavioural response to the signal is advantageous, statistically, compared to the behaviour that would occur in absence of the signal. Ultimately the value of the signalled information depends on the extent to which it allows the receiver to increase its fitness.

One type of honest signal is the signalling of quality in sexually reproducing animals. In sexually reproducing animals, one sex is generally the "choosing sex" (often females) and the other the "advertising sex" (often males). The choosing sex achieves the highest fitness by choosing the partner of the highest (genetic) quality. This quality cannot be observed directly, so the advertising sex can evolve a signal, which advertises its quality. Examples of these signals include the tail of a peacock and the colouration of male sticklebacks. Such signals only work, i.e. are reliable, if the signal is honest. The link between the quality of the advertising sex and the signal may depend on environmental stressors, with honesty increasing in more challenging environments.

Another type of honest signal is the aposematic warning signal, generally visual, given by poisonous or dangerous animals such as wasps, poison dart frogs, and pufferfish. Warning signals are honest indications of noxious prey, because conspicuousness evolves in tandem with noxiousness (a conspicuous, non-noxious organism gets eaten). Thus, the brighter and more conspicuous the organism, the more toxic it usually is. The most common and effective colours are red, yellow, black and white.

The mathematical biologist John Maynard Smith discusses whether honest signalling must always be costly. He notes that it had been shown that "in some circumstances" a signal is reliable only if it is costly. He states that it had been assumed that parameters such as pay-offs and signalling costs were constant, but that this might be unrealistic. He states that with some restrictions, signals can be cost-free, reliable, and evolutionarily stable. However, if costs and benefits "vary uniformly over the whole range" then indeed honest signals have to be costly.

== Dishonest signals ==
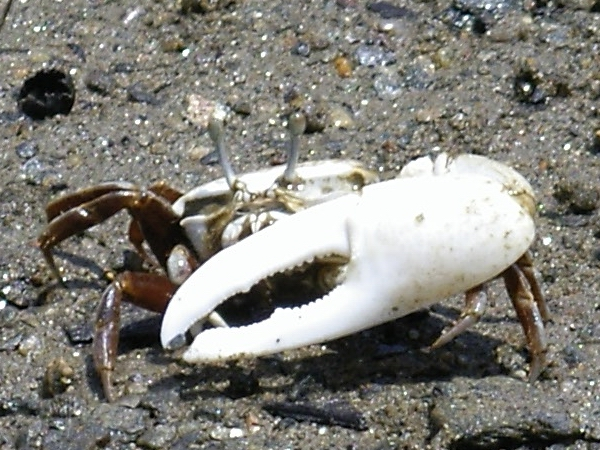
Male fiddler crab, in the family Ocypodidae, signals with its enlarged fighting claw, but weak regrown claws may be dishonest signals.

Because there are both mutual and conflicting interests in most animal signalling systems, a central problem in signalling theory is dishonesty or cheating. For example, if foraging birds are safer when they give a warning call, cheats could give false alarms at random, just in case a predator is nearby. But too much cheating could cause the signalling system to collapse. Every dishonest signal weakens the integrity of the signalling system, and so reduces the fitness of the group. An example of dishonest signalling comes from Fiddler crabs such as Austruca mjoebergi, which have been shown to bluff (no conscious intention being implied) about their fighting ability. When a claw is lost, a crab occasionally regrows a weaker claw that nevertheless intimidates crabs with smaller but stronger claws. The proportion of dishonest signals is low enough for it not to be worthwhile for crabs to test the honesty of every signal through combat.

Richard Dawkins and John Krebs in 1978 considered whether individuals of the same species would act as if attempting to deceive each other. They applied a "selfish gene" view of evolution to animals' threat displays to see if it would be in their genes' interests to give dishonest signals. They criticised previous ethologists, such as Nikolaas Tinbergen and Desmond Morris, for suggesting that such displays were "for the good of the species". They argued that such communication ought to be viewed as an evolutionary arms race in which signallers evolve to become better at manipulating receivers, while receivers evolve to become more resistant to manipulation. The game theoretical model of the war of attrition similarly suggests that threat displays ought not to convey any reliable information about intentions.

Deceptive signals can be used both within and between species. Perhaps the best-known example of inter-species deception is mimicry: when individuals of one species mimic the appearance or behaviour of individuals of another species. A variety of mimicry types exist, including Batesian, Müllerian, host mimicry and "aggressive" mimicry. A very frequent type is ant mimicry. Deception within species can be bluffing (during contest) or sexual mimicry where males or females mimic the patterns and behaviour of the opposite sex. A well-known example is the bluegill sunfish where mimic males look like and behave like females in order to sneak into the guarded nests of territorial males and fertilize some of the eggs.

== Handicap principle ==
The handicap principle is an obsolete idea originating with Amotz Zahavi, now considered disproven. Biologists believe honest signals are maintained by condition dependent trade-offs, not by handicaps.

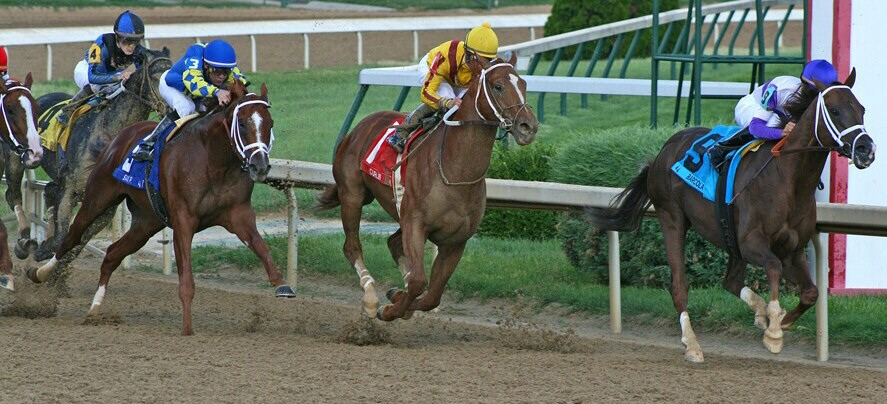
The best horses in a handicap race carry the largest weights, so the size of the handicap is a measure of the animal's quality.

In 1975, Zahavi proposed a verbal model for how signal costs could constrain cheating and stabilize an "honest" correlation between observed signals and unobservable qualities, based on an analogy to sports handicapping systems. He called this idea the handicap principle. The purpose of a sports handicapping system is to reduce disparities in performance, making the contest more competitive. In a handicap race, intrinsically faster horses are given heavier weights to carry under their saddles. Similarly, in amateur golf, better golfers have fewer strokes subtracted from their raw scores. This creates correlations between the handicap and unhandicapped performance, if the handicaps work as they are supposed to, between the handicap imposed and the corresponding horse's handicapped performance. If nothing was known about two race horses or two amateur golfers except their handicaps, an observer could infer who is most likely to win: the horse with the bigger weight handicap, and the golfer with the smaller stroke handicap. By analogy, if peacock 'tails' (large tail covert feathers) act as a handicapping system, and a peahen knew nothing about two peacocks except the sizes of their tails, she could "infer" that the peacock with the bigger tail has greater unobservable intrinsic quality. Display costs can include extrinsic social costs, in the form of testing and punishment by rivals, as well as intrinsic production costs. Another example given in textbooks is the extinct Irish elk, Megaloceros giganteus. The male Irish elk's enormous antlers could perhaps have evolved as displays of ability to overcome handicap, though biologists point out that if the handicap is inherited, its genes ought to be selected against.

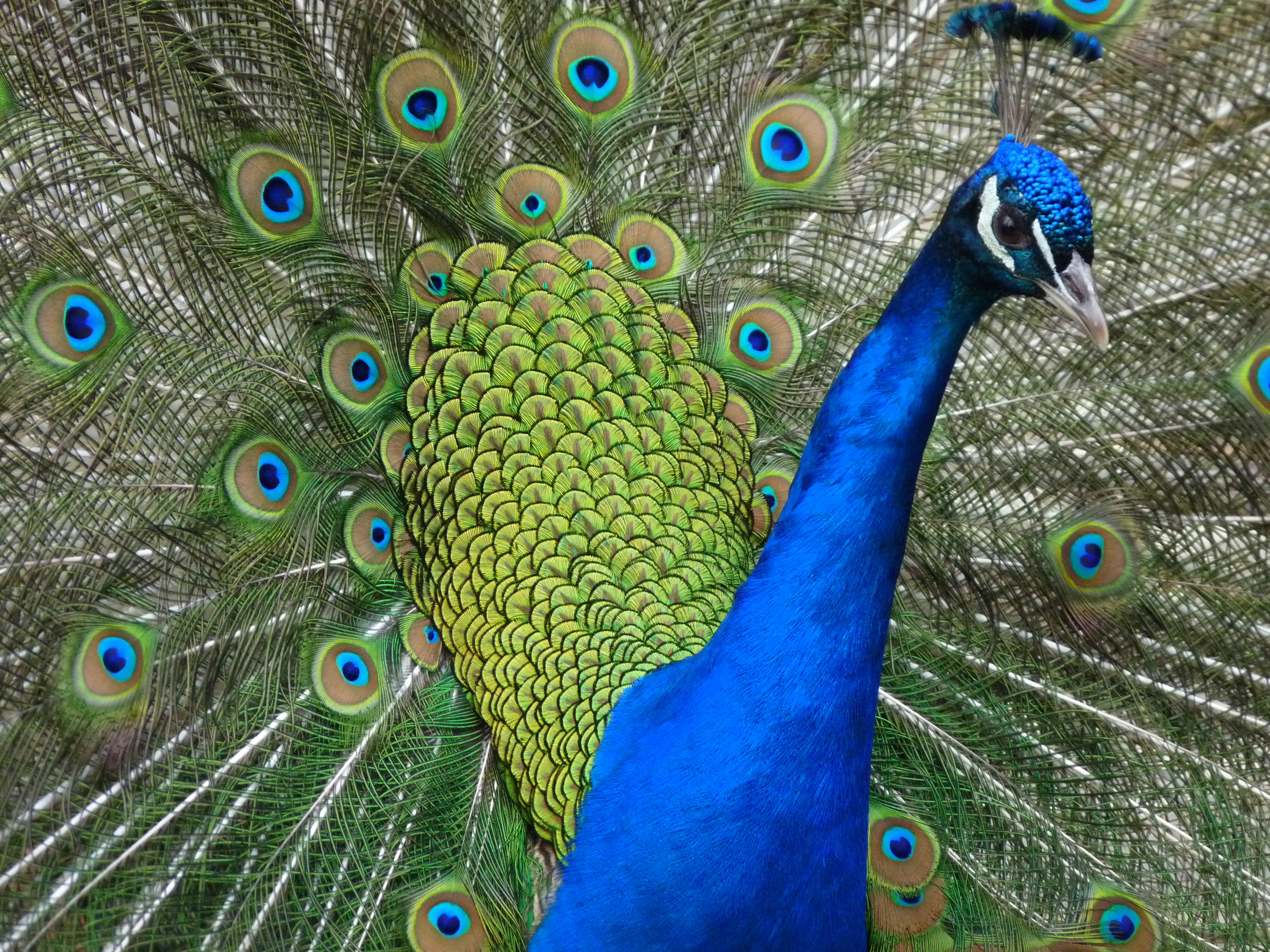
Peacock signals reproductive fitness with its large colourful tail, possibly because it is a handicap.

A similar idea to the Handicap Principle was articulated by Kurt Vonnegut in his 1961 short story Harrison Bergeron. In Vonnegut's futuristic dystopia, the Handicapper General uses a variety of handicapping mechanisms to reduce inequalities in performance. A spectator at a ballet comments: "it was easy to see that she was the strongest and most graceful of all dancers, for her handicap bags were as big as those worn by two hundred pound men." Zahavi interpreted this analogy to mean that higher quality peacocks with bigger tails are signalling their ability to "waste" more of some resource by trading it off for a bigger tail. This resonates with Thorstein Veblen's idea that conspicuous consumption and extravagant status symbols can signal wealth.

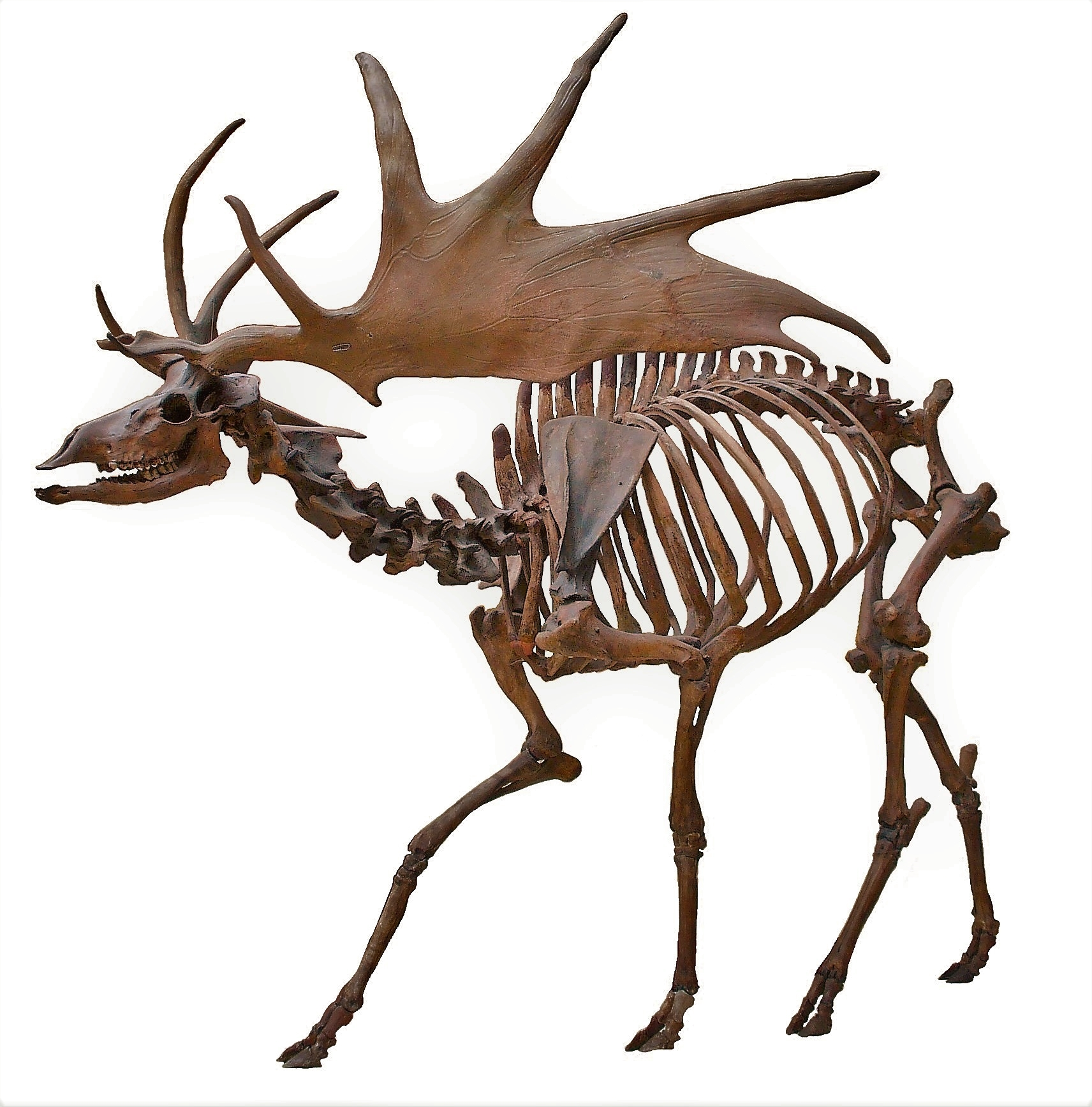
The enormous antlers of the extinct Irish elk, Megaloceros giganteus may have evolved as displays of ability to overcome handicap.

Zahavi's conclusions rest on his verbal interpretation of a metaphor, and initially the handicap principle was not well received by evolutionary biologists. However, in 1984, Nur and Hasson used life history theory to show how differences in signalling costs, in the form of survival-reproduction tradeoffs, could stabilize a signalling system roughly as Zahavi imagined. Genetic models also suggested this was possible. In 1990 Alan Grafen showed that a handicap-like signalling system was evolutionarily stable if higher quality signallers paid lower marginal survival costs for their signals.

In 1982, W. D. Hamilton proposed a specific but widely applicable handicap mechanism, parasite-mediated sexual selection. He argued that in the never-ending co-evolutionary race between hosts and their parasites, sexually selected signals indicate health. This idea was tested in 1994 in barn swallows, a species where males have long tail streamers. Møller found that the males with longer tails, and their offspring, did have fewer bloodsucking mites, whereas fostered young did not. The effect was therefore genetic, confirming Hamilton's theory.

Another example is Lozano's hypothesis that carotenoids have dual but mutually incompatible roles in immune function and signalling. Given that animals cannot synthesize carotenoids de novo, these must be obtained from food. The hypothesis states that animals with carotenoid-depended sexual signals are demonstrating their ability to "waste" carotenoids on sexual signals at the expense of their immune system.

The handicap principle has proven hard to test empirically, partly because of inconsistent interpretations of Zahavi's metaphor and Grafen's marginal fitness model, and partly because of conflicting empirical results: in some studies individuals with bigger signals seem to pay higher costs, in other studies they seem to be paying lower costs. A possible explanation for the inconsistent empirical results is given in a series of papers by Getty, who shows that Grafen's proof of the handicap principle is based on the critical simplifying assumption that signallers trade off costs for benefits in an additive fashion, the way humans invest money to increase income in the same currency. (Note: Grafen's proof is formally similar to a classic monograph on economic market signalling by Nobel laureate Michael Spence.) But the assumption that costs and benefits trade off in an additive fashion is true only on a logarithmic scale; for the survival cost – reproduction benefit tradeoff is assumed to mediate the evolution of sexually selected signals. Fitness depends on producing offspring, which is a multiplicative function of reproductive success given an individual is still alive times the probability of still being alive, given investment in signals.

Later models have shown that the popularity of handicap principle relies on the critical misinterpretation of Grafen's model by Grafen himself. Contrary to his claims, his model is not a model of handicap signalling. Grafen's key equations show the necessity of marginal cost and differential marginal cost, nowhere in his paper was Grafen able to show the necessity of wasteful equilibrium cost (a.k.a. handicap). Grafen's model is a model of condition dependent signalling that builds on a traditional life-history trade-off between reproduction and survival. In general, later models have shown that the key condition of honest signalling is the existence of such condition-dependent trade-off and that the cost of signals can be anything at the equilibrium for honest individuals, including zero or even negative. The reason is that deception is prevented by the potential cost of cheating and not by the cost paid by the honest individuals. This potential cost of cheating (marginal cost) has to be larger than the potential (marginal) benefits for potential cheaters. In turn this implies that the honest peacock or deer need not be wasteful, it will be efficient. It is the potential cheater that needs to be less efficient. Signal selection is not a selection for waste, as claimed by Zahavi, it is guided by the same mechanism - natural selection - as any other trait in nature.

== Costly signalling and Fisherian diploid dynamics ==
The effort to discover how costs can constrain an "honest" correlation between observable signals and unobservable qualities within signallers is built on strategic models of signalling games, with many simplifying assumptions. These models are most often applied to sexually selected signalling in diploid animals, but they rarely incorporate a fact about diploid sexual reproduction noted by the mathematical biologist Ronald Fisher in the early 20th century: if there are "preference genes" correlated with choosiness in females as well as "signal genes" correlated with display traits in males, choosier females should tend to mate with showier males. Over generations, showier sons should also carry genes associated with choosier daughters, and choosier daughters should also carry genes associated with showier sons. This can cause the evolutionary dynamic known as Fisherian runaway, in which males become ever showier. Russell Lande explored this with a quantitative genetic model, showing that Fisherian diploid dynamics are sensitive to signalling and search costs. Other models incorporate both costly signalling and Fisherian runaway. These models show that if fitness depends on both survival and reproduction, having sexy sons and choosy daughters (in the stereotypical model) can be adaptive, increasing fitness just as much as having healthy sons and daughters.

== Models of signalling interactions ==
Perhaps the most popular tool to investigate signalling interactions is game theory. A typical model investigates an interaction between a signaller and a receiver. Games can be symmetrical or asymmetric. There can be several types of asymmetries including asymmetry in resources or asymmetry of information. In many asymmetric games the receiver is in a possession of a resource that the signaller wants to get (resource asymmetry). Signallers can be of different types; the type of any given signaller is assumed to be hidden (information asymmetry). Asymmetric games are frequently used to model mate choice (sexual selection) or parent-offspring interactions. Asymmetric games are also used to model interspecific interactions such as predator-prey, host-parasite or plant-pollinator signalling. Symmetric games can be used to model competition for resources, such as animals fighting for food or for a territory.

== Human honest signals ==
Human behaviour may also provide examples of costly signals. In general, these signals provide information about a person's phenotypic quality or cooperative tendencies. Evidence for costly signalling has been found in many areas of human interaction including risk-taking, hunting, and religion.

=== Costly signalling in hunting ===
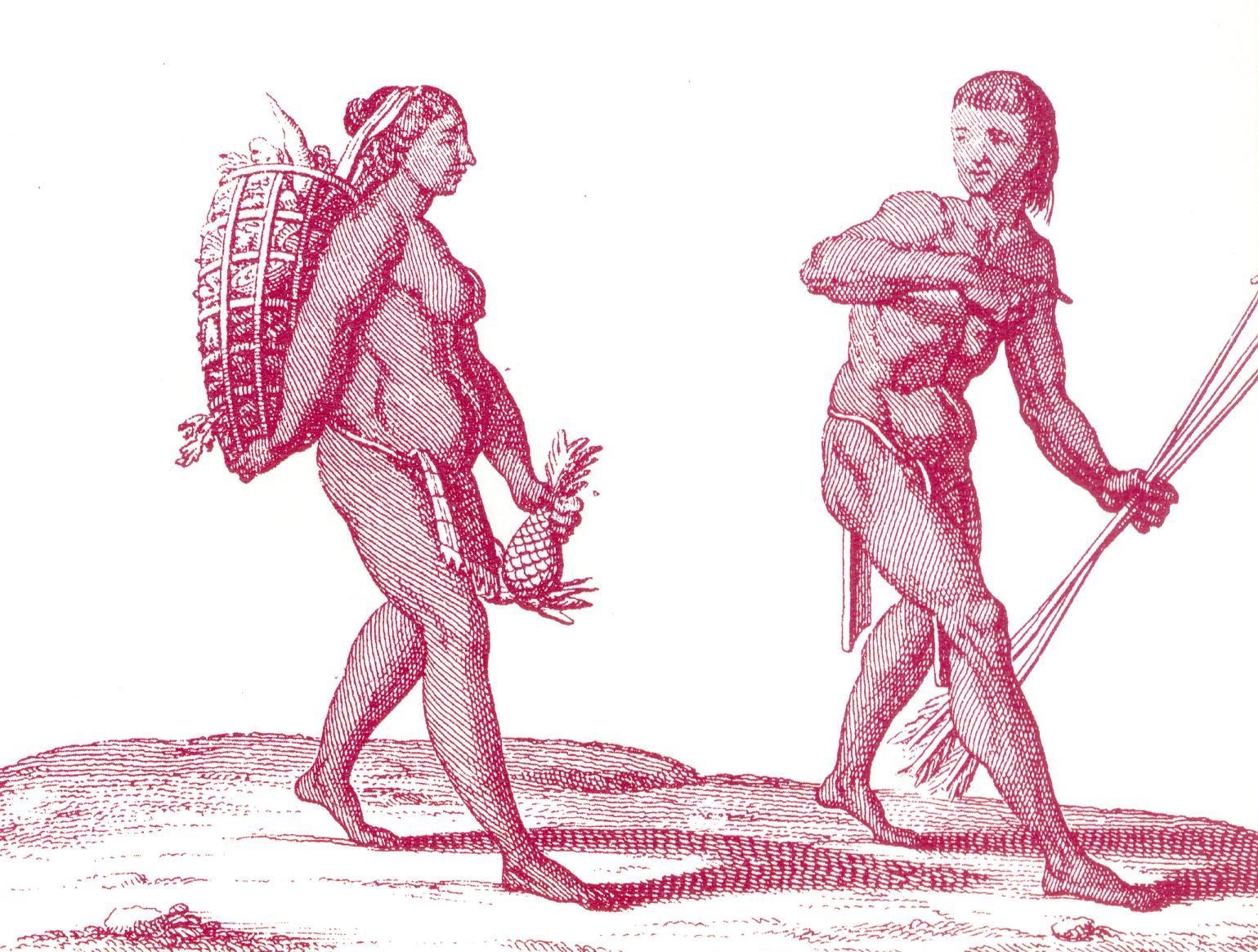
A female gatherer and a male hunter of the Kali'na people of Guyana, drawn by Pierre Barrère in 1743. Generous sharing by male hunters may serve as a "costly signal", helping them to acquire mates.

Large game hunting has been studied extensively as a signal of men's willingness to take physical risks, as well as showcase strength and coordination. Costly signalling theory is a useful tool for understanding food sharing among hunter gatherers because it can be applied to situations in which delayed reciprocity is not a viable explanation. Instances that are particularly inconsistent with the delayed reciprocity hypothesis are those in which a hunter shares his kill indiscriminately with all members of a large group. In these situations, the individuals sharing meat have no control over whether or not their generosity will be reciprocated, and free riding becomes an attractive strategy for those receiving meat. Free riders are people who reap the benefits of group-living without contributing to its maintenance. Costly signalling theory can fill some of the gaps left by the delayed reciprocity hypothesis. Hawkes has suggested that men target large game and publicly share meat to draw social attention or to show off. Such display and the resulting favorable attention can improve a hunter's reputation by providing information about his phenotypic quality. High quality signallers are more successful in acquiring mates and allies. Thus, costly signalling theory can explain apparently wasteful and altruistic behaviour.

In order to be effective, costly signals must fulfill specific criteria. Firstly, signallers must incur different levels of cost and benefit for signalling behaviour. Secondly, costs and benefits must reflect the signallers' phenotypic quality. Thirdly, the information provided by a signal should be directed at and accessible to an audience. A receiver can be anyone who stands to benefit from information the signaller is sending, such as potential mates, allies, or competitors. Honesty is guaranteed when only individuals of high quality can pay the (high) costs of signalling. Hence, costly signals make it impossible for low-quality individuals to fake a signal and fool a receiver.

Bliege Bird et al. observed turtle hunting and spear fishing patterns in a Meriam community in the Torres Strait of Australia, publishing their findings in 2001. Here, only some Meriam men were able to accumulate high caloric gains for the amount of time spent turtle hunting or spear fishing (reaching a threshold measured in kcal/h). Since a daily catch of fish is carried home by hand and turtles are frequently served at large feasts, members of the community know which men most reliably brought them turtle meat and fish. Thus, turtle hunting qualifies as a costly signal. Furthermore, turtle hunting and spear fishing are actually less productive (in kcal/h) than foraging for shellfish, where success depends only on the amount of time dedicated to searching, so shellfish foraging is a poor signal of skill or strength. This suggests that energetic gains are not the primary reason men take part in turtle hunting and spear fishing. A follow-up study found that successful Meriam hunters do experience greater social benefits and reproductive success than less skilled hunters.

The Hadza people of Tanzania also share food, possibly to gain in reputation. Hunters cannot be sharing meat mainly to provision their families or to gain reciprocal benefits, as teenage boys often give away their meat even though they do not yet have wives or children, so costly signalling of their qualities is the likely explanation. These qualities include good eyesight, coordination, strength, knowledge, endurance, or bravery. Hadza hunters more often pair with highly fertile, hard-working wives than non-hunters. A woman benefits from mating with a man who possesses such qualities as her children will most likely inherit qualities that increase fitness and survivorship. She may also benefit from her husband's high social status. Thus, hunting is an honest and costly signal of phenotypic quality.

Among the men of Ifaluk atoll, costly signalling theory can also explain why men torch fish. Torch fishing is a ritualized method of fishing on Ifaluk whereby men use torches made from dried coconut fronds to catch large dog-toothed tuna. Preparation for torch fishing requires significant time investments and involves a great deal of organization. Due to the time and energetic costs of preparation, torch fishing results in net caloric losses for fishers. Therefore, torch fishing is a handicap that serves to signal men's productivity. Torch fishing is the most advertised fishing occupation on Ifaluk. Women and others usually spend time observing the canoes as they sail beyond the reef. Also, local rituals help to broadcast information about which fishers are successful and enhance fishers' reputations during the torch fishing season. Several ritual behaviors and dietary constraints clearly distinguish torch fishers from other men. First, males are only permitted to torch fish if they participate on the first day of the fishing season. The community is well informed as to who participates on this day, and can easily identify the torch fishers. Second, torch fishers receive all of their meals at the canoe house and are prohibited from eating certain foods. People frequently discuss the qualities of torch fishermen. On Ifaluk, women claim that they are looking for hard-working mates. With the distinct sexual division of labor on Ifaluk, industriousness is a highly valued characteristic in males. Torch fishing thus provides women with reliable information on the work ethic of prospective mates, which makes it an honest costly signal.

In many human cases, a strong reputation built through costly signalling enhances a man's social status over the statuses of men who signal less successfully. Among northern Kalahari foraging groups, traditional hunters usually capture a maximum of two or three antelopes per year. It was said of a particularly successful hunter:

"It was said of him that he never returned from a hunt without having killed at least a wildebeest, if not something larger. Hence the people connected with him ate a great deal of meat and his popularity grew."

Although this hunter was sharing meat, he was not doing so in the framework of reciprocity. The general model of costly signalling is not reciprocal; rather, individuals who share acquire more mates and allies. Costly signalling applies to situations in Kalahari foraging groups where giving often goes to recipients who have little to offer in return. A young hunter is motivated to impress community members with daughters so that he can obtain his first wife. Older hunters may wish to attract women interested in an extramarital relationship, or to be a co-wife. In these northern Kalahari groups, the killing of a large animal indicates a man who has mastered the art of hunting and can support a family. Many women seek a man who is a good hunter, has an agreeable character, is generous, and has advantageous social ties. Since hunting ability is a prerequisite for marriage, men who are good hunters enter the marriage market earliest. Costly signalling theory explains seemingly wasteful foraging displays.

=== Physical risk ===
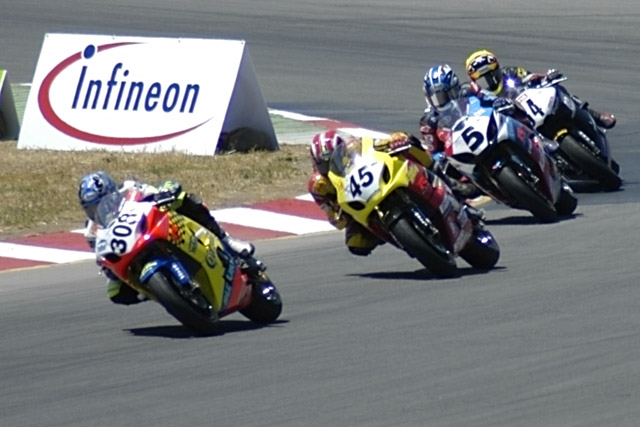
Young men may take part in risky sports like motorcycle racing to signal their strength and skill.

Costly signalling can be applied to situations involving physical strain and risk of physical injury or death. Research on physical risk-taking is important because information regarding why people, especially young men, take part in high risk activities can help in the development of prevention programs. Reckless driving is a lethal problem among young men in western societies. A male who takes a physical risk is sending the message that he has enough strength and skill to survive extremely dangerous activities. This signal is directed at peers and potential mates. When those peers are criminals or gang members, sociologists Diego Gambetta and James Densley find that risk-taking signals can help expedite acceptance into the group.

In a study of risk-taking, some types of risk, such as physical or heroic risk for others' benefit, are viewed more favorably than other types of risk, such as taking drugs. Males and females valued different degrees of heroic risk for mates and same-sex friends. Males valued heroic risk-taking by male friends, but preferred less of it in female mates. Females valued heroic risk-taking in male mates and less of it in female friends. Females may be attracted to males inclined to physically defend them and their children. Males may prefer heroic risk-taking by male friends as they could be good allies.

In western societies, voluntary blood donation is a common, yet less extreme, form of risk-taking. Costs associated with these donations include pain and risk of infection. If blood donation is an opportunity to send costly signals, then donors will be perceived by others as generous and physically healthy. In a survey, both donors and non-donors attributed health, generosity, and ability to operate in stressful situations to blood donors.

=== Religion ===
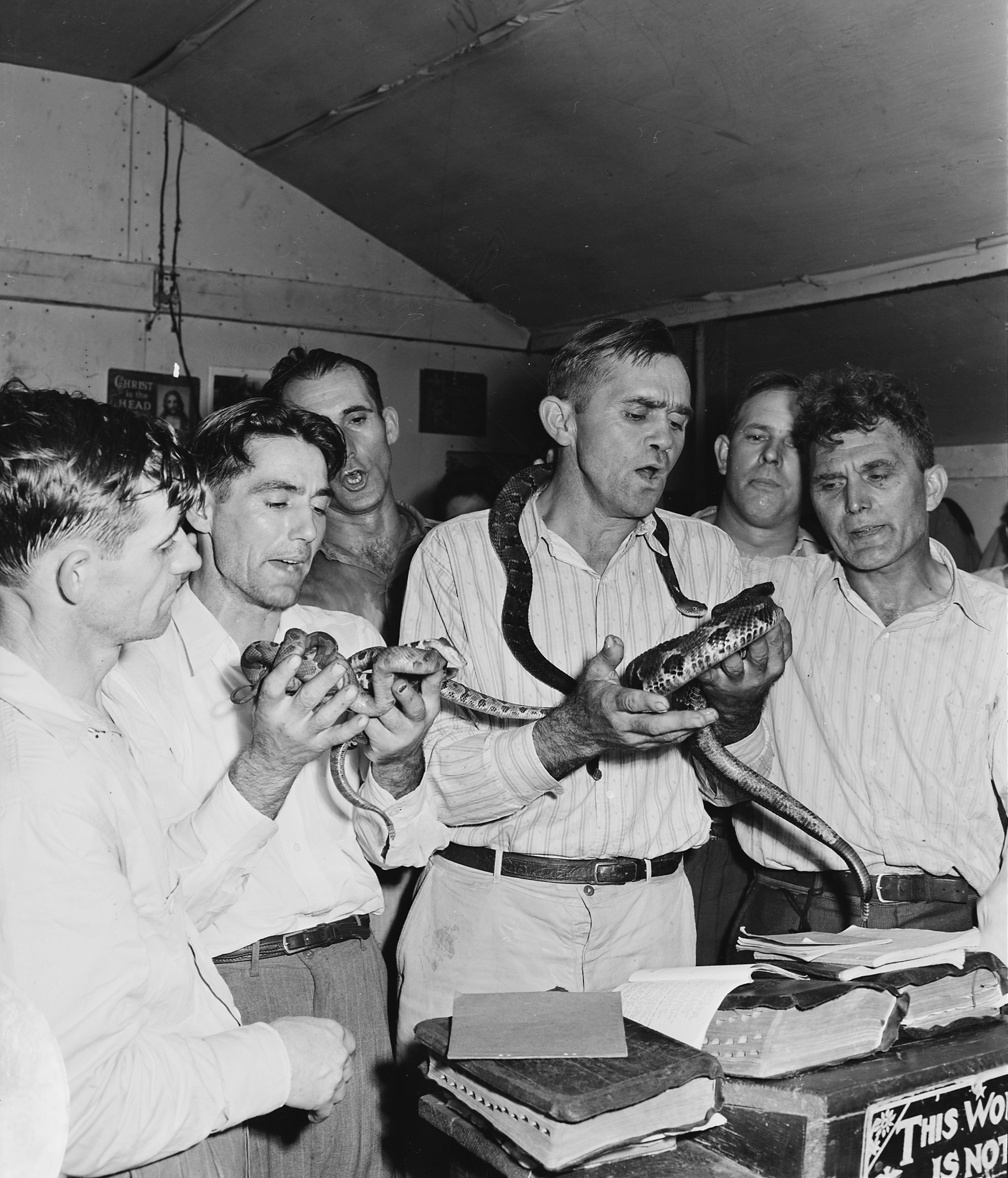
Religious rituals such as snake handling may be explainable as costly signals.

Costly religious rituals such as genital modification, food and water deprivation, and snake handling look paradoxical in evolutionary terms. Devout religious beliefs wherein such traditions are practiced appear maladaptive. Religion may have arisen to increase and maintain intragroup cooperation. Cooperation leads to altruistic behaviour, and costly signalling could explain this. All religions may involve costly and elaborate rituals, performed publicly, to demonstrate loyalty to the religious group. In this way, group members increase their allegiance to the group by signalling their investment in group interests. However, as group size increases among humans, the threat of free riders grows. Costly signalling theory accounts for this by proposing that these religious rituals are costly enough to deter free riders.

Irons proposed that costly signalling theory could explain costly religious behaviour. He argued that hard-to-fake religious displays enhanced trust and solidarity in a community, producing emotional and economic benefits. He showed that display signals among the Yomut Turkmen of northern Iran helped to secure trade agreements. These "ostentatious" displays signalled commitment to Islam to strangers and group members. Sosis demonstrated that people in religious communities are four times more likely to live longer than their secular counterparts, and that these longer lifespans were positively correlated with the number of costly requirements demanded from religious community members. However, confounding variables may not have been excluded. Wood found that religion offers a subjective feeling of well-being within a community, where costly signalling protects against free riders and helps to build self-control among committed members. Iannaccone studied the effects of costly signals on religious communities. In a self-reported survey, as the strictness of a church increased, the attendance and contributions to that church increased proportionally. In effect, people were more willing to participate in a church that has more stringent demands on its members. Despite this observation, costly donations and acts conducted in a religious context does not itself establish that membership in these clubs is actually worth the entry costs imposed.

Despite the experimental support for this hypothesis, it remains controversial. A common critique is that devoutness is easy to fake, such as simply by attending a religious service. However, the hypothesis predicts that people are more likely to join and contribute to a religious group when its rituals are costly. Another critique specifically asks: why religion? There is no evolutionary advantage to evolving religion over other signals of commitment such as nationality, as Irons admits. However, the reinforcement of religious rites as well as the intrinsic reward and punishment system found in religion makes it an ideal candidate for increasing intragroup cooperation. Finally, there is insufficient evidence for increase in fitness as a result of religious cooperation. However, Sosis argues for benefits from religion itself, such as increased longevity, improved health, assistance during crises, and greater psychological well-being, although both the supposed benefits from religion and the costly-signaling mechanism have been contested.

=== Language ===
Some scholars view the emergence of language as the consequence of some kind of social transformation that, by generating unprecedented levels of public trust, liberated a genetic potential for linguistic creativity that had previously lain dormant. "Ritual/speech coevolution theory" views rituals as costly signals that ensures honesty and reliability of language communication. Scholars in this intellectual camp argue that even chimpanzees and bonobos have latent symbolic capacities that they rarely—if ever—use in the wild. Objecting to the sudden mutation idea, these authors state that even if a chance mutation were to install a language organ in an evolving bipedal primate, it would be adaptively useless. A very specific social structure—one capable of upholding unusually high levels of public accountability and trust—must have evolved before or concurrently with language to make reliance on "cheap signals" (words) an evolutionarily stable strategy.

== See also ==
- Alarm signal
- Conspicuous consumption
- Dramaturgy (sociology)
- Game theory
- Green-beard effect
- Knowledge falsification
- Origin of language
- Signalling (economics)
- Virtue signalling
- Zoosemiotics

== Sources ==
- Archetti, M. (2000). "The origin of autumn colours by coevolution". Journal of Theoretical Biology. 205 (4): 625–630. Bibcode:2000JThBi.205..625A. doi:10.1006/jtbi.2000.2089. PMID 10931756. S2CID 27615064.
- Barrett, L.; Dunbar, R.; Lycett, J. (2002). Human evolutionary psychology. Princeton University Press. ISBN 978-0-691-09622-3.
- Bergstrom, C. T.; Lachmann, M. (2001). "Alarm calls as costly signals of antipredator vigilance: the watchful babbler game". Animal Behaviour. 61 (3): 535–543. CiteSeerX 10.1.1.28.773. doi:10.1006/anbe.2000.1636. S2CID 2295026.
- Bliege Bird, R.; Bird, D. W. (1997). "Delayed reciprocity and tolerated theft". Current Anthropology. 38 (1): 49–78. doi:10.1086/204581. JSTOR 2744435. S2CID 144673809.
- Bliege Bird, R.; Smith, E; Bird, D (2001). "The Hunting Handicap: Costly Signaling in Human Foraging Strategies". Behavioral Ecology and Sociobiology. 50 (1): 96. doi:10.1007/s002650100375. S2CID 44317038.
- Blount, Jonathan D.; Speed, Michael P.; Ruxton, Graeme D.; Stephens, Philip A. (2009). "Warning displays may function as honest signals of toxicity". Proceedings of the Royal Society B. 276 (1658): 871–877. doi:10.1098/rspb.2008.1407. PMC 2664363. PMID 19019790.
- Bradbury, J. W.; Vehrenkamp, S. L. (1998). Principles of animal communication. Sunderland, MA: Sinauer. ISBN 978-0-87893-100-2.
- Bulbulia, J. (2004). "The cognitive and evolutionary psychology of religion". Biology and Philosophy. 19 (5): 655–686. doi:10.1007/s10539-005-5568-6. S2CID 14168539.
- Caryl, P. G. (1979). "Communication by agonistic displays: what can games theory contribute to ethology?". Behaviour. 68 (1–2): 136–169. doi:10.1163/156853979X00287.
- Dall, S. R. X.; Giraldeau, L.; Olsson, O.; McNamara, J.; Stephens, D. (2005). "Information and its use by animals in evolutionary ecology". Trends Ecol. Evol. 20 (4): 187–193. doi:10.1016/j.tree.2005.01.010. PMID 16701367.
- Dawkins, Richard; Krebs, John (1978). Krebs, John; Davies, N. B. (eds.). Animal signals: information or manipulation?. Blackwell. pp. 282–309.
- Densley, James A. (2012). "Street Gang Recruitment: Signaling, Screening, and Selection". Social Problems. 59 (3): 301–321. doi:10.1525/sp.2012.59.3.301.
- Dowling, J. H. (1968). "Individual ownership and the sharing of game in hunting societies". American Anthropologist. 70 (3): 502–507. doi:10.1525/aa.1968.70.3.02a00040.
- Eshel, I.; Sansone, Emilia; Jacobs, Frans (2002). "A long-term genetic model for the evolution of sexual preference: the theories of Fisher and Zahavi re-examined". J. Math. Biol. 45 (1): 1–25. doi:10.1007/s002850200138. PMID 12140688. S2CID 23864644.
- Farthing, G. W. (2005). "Attitudes toward heroic and non-heroic physical risk takers as mates and as friends". Evolution and Human Behavior. 26 (2): 171–185. Bibcode:2005EHumB..26..171F. doi:10.1016/j.evolhumbehav.2004.08.004.
- Feldhamer, George A. (2007). Mammalogy: Adaptation, Diversity, Ecology. JHU Press. p. 423.
- Gambetta, Diego (2009) [1952]. Codes of the underworld: how criminals communicate. Princeton University Press. ISBN 978-0-691-11937-3. OCLC 243550245.
- Gerhardt, H. Carl; Humfeld, Sarah C.; Marshall, Vincent T. (2007). "Temporal order and the evolution of complex acoustic signals". Proceedings of the Royal Society B. 274 (1619): 1789–1794. doi:10.1098/rspb.2007.0451. PMC 2173945. PMID 17507330. "A first step in understanding the evolution of complex signals is to identify the factors that increase the effectiveness of compound signals with two different elements relative to a single-element signal. Are there, for example, characteristics of novel elements that make a compound call more attractive to prospective mates than a single established element alone? Or is any novel element that increases sensory stimulation per se likely to have this effect?"
- Getty, T. (1998a). "Handicap signalling: when fecundity and viability do not add up". Animal Behaviour. 56 (1): 127–130. doi:10.1006/anbe.1998.0744. PMID 9710469. S2CID 36731320.
- Getty, T. (1998b). "Reliable signalling need not be a handicap". Animal Behaviour. 56 (1): 253–255. doi:10.1006/anbe.1998.0748. PMID 9710484. S2CID 34066689.
- Getty, T. (2002). "The discriminating babbler meets the optimal diet hawk". Anim. Behav. 63 (2): 397–402. doi:10.1006/anbe.2001.1890. S2CID 53164940.
- Getty, T. (2006). "Sexually selected signals are not similar to sports handicaps". Trends in Ecology and Evolution. 21 (2): 83–88. doi:10.1016/j.tree.2005.10.016. PMID 16701479.
- Godfray, H. C. J. (1995). "Evolutionary theory of parent-offspring conflict". Nature. 376 (6536): 133–138. Bibcode:1995Natur.376..133G. doi:10.1038/376133a0. PMID 7603563. S2CID 4311075.
- Grafen, A. (1990). "Biological signals as handicaps". Journal of Theoretical Biology. 144 (4): 517–546. Bibcode:1990JThBi.144..517G. doi:10.1016/S0022-5193(05)80088-8. PMID 2402153.
- Gurven, M.; Hill, K. (2009). "Why do men hunt?". Current Anthropology. 50 (1): 51–73. doi:10.1086/595620. PMID 19579355. S2CID 33909267.
- Gurven, M.; Hill, K.; Hurtado, A.; Lyles, R; Lyles, Richard (2000). "Food transfers among Hiwi foragers of Venezuela: tests of reciprocity". Human Ecology. 28 (2): 171–218. doi:10.1023/A:1007067919982. S2CID 11683972.
- Hamilton, W. D.; Brown, SP (2001). "Autumn tree colours as a handicap signal". Proceedings of the Royal Society B. 268 (1475): 1489–1493. doi:10.1098/rspb.2001.1672. PMC 1088768. PMID 11454293.
- Hamilton, W. D.; Zuk, M. (1982). "Heritable true fitness and bright birds: a role for parasites?". Science. 218 (4570): 384–387. Bibcode:1982Sci...218..384H. doi:10.1126/science.7123238. PMID 7123238. S2CID 17658568.
- Hawkes, K. (1990). Cashdan, E. (ed.). Why do men hunt? Some benefits for risky choices. Westview, Boulder. pp. 145–166.
- Hawkes, K. (1991). "Showing off: tests of another hypothesis about men's foraging goals". Ethological Sociobiology. 12: 29–54. doi:10.1016/0162-3095(91)90011-E.
- Hawkes, K. (1993). "Why hunter-gatherers work". Current Anthropology. 34 (4): 341–362. doi:10.1086/204182. S2CID 62877593.
- Hawkes, K.; O'Connell, J. F.; Blurton Jones, N. G. (2001). "Hadza meat sharing". Evol Hum Behav. 22 (2): 113–142. Bibcode:2001EHumB..22..113H. doi:10.1016/S1090-5138(00)00066-0. PMID 11282309.
- Hawkes, K.; Bliege Bird, R (2002). "Showing off, handicap signaling, and the evolution of men's work". Evolutionary Anthropology. 11 (2): 58–67. doi:10.1002/evan.20005. S2CID 15164689.
- Hood, R.; Hill, P.; Spilka, B. (2009). The Psychology of Religion: An Empirical Approach. Guilford Press. ISBN 978-1-606-23303-0.
- Iannaccone, L. R. (1992). "Sacrifice and Stigma: Reducing Free-Riding in Cults, Communes, and Other Collectives". Journal of Political Economy. 100 (2): 271–291. doi:10.1086/261818. S2CID 140903249.
- Irons, W. (1996). J. P. Hurd (ed.). Morality as an Evolved Adaptation. Edwin Mellon Press. pp. 1–34.
- Irons, W. (2001). Randolph Nesse (ed.). Religion as a hard-to-fake sign of commitment. Russell Sage Foundation. pp. 292–309.
- Johnstone, R. A. (1995). "Sexual selection, honest advertisement and the handicap principle: reviewing the evidence". Biological Reviews. 70 (1): 1–65. doi:10.1111/j.1469-185X.1995.tb01439.x. PMID 7718697. S2CID 40322800.
- Johnstone, R. A. (1997). Krebs, J. R.; Davies, N. B. (eds.). The evolution of animal signals. Blackwell. pp. 155–178.
- Johnstone, R. A. (1998). "Conspiratorial whispers and conspicuous displays: Games of signal detection". Evolution. 52 (6): 1554–1563. doi:10.2307/2411329. JSTOR 2411329. PMID 28565324.
- Johnstone, R. A. (1999). "Signaling of need, sibling competition, and the cost of honesty". PNAS. 96 (22): 12644–12649. Bibcode:1999PNAS...9612644J. doi:10.1073/pnas.96.22.12644. PMC 23029. PMID 10535976.
- Kelly, R. L. (1995). The foraging spectrum: diversity in hunter-gatherer lifeways. Smithsonian Institution Press.
- Kokko, H. (2002). "The sexual selection continuum". Proceedings of the Royal Society B. 269 (1498): 1331–1340. doi:10.1098/rspb.2002.2020. PMC 1691039. PMID 12079655.
- Kotiaho, J. S. (2001). "Costs of sexual traits: a mismatch between theoretical considerations and empirical evidence". Biological Reviews. 76 (3): 365–376. doi:10.1017/S1464793101005711. PMID 11569789. S2CID 31138256.
- Lailvaux, Simon P.; Reaney, Leeann T.; Backwell, Patricia R. Y. (2009). "Dishonest signalling of fighting ability and multiple performance traits in the fiddler crab Uca mjoebergi". Functional Ecology. 23 (2). Wiley: 359–366. Bibcode:2009FuEco..23..359L. doi:10.1111/j.1365-2435.2008.01501.x. ISSN 0269-8463.
- Lee, R. B. (1979). The !Kung San: men, women and work in a foraging society. Cambridge University Press.
- Lee, R. B. (1993). The Dobe Ju/'hoansi. Harcourt Brace.
- Lozano, G. A. (1994). "Carotenoids, parasites, and sexual selection". Oikos. 70 (2): 309–311. Bibcode:1994Oikos..70..309L. doi:10.2307/3545643. JSTOR 3545643. S2CID 86971117.
- Lyle, H.; Smith, E.; Sullivan, R. (2009). "Blood Donations as Costly Signals of Donor Quality" (PDF). Journal of Evolutionary Psychology. 7 (4): 263–286. CiteSeerX 10.1.1.621.5917. doi:10.1556/JEP.7.2009.4.1. Archived from the original (PDF) on 2023-03-07.
- Maan, M. E.; Cummings, M.E. (2012). "Poison frog colors are honest signals of toxicity, particularly for bird predators". American Naturalist. 179 (1): E1–E14. doi:10.1086/663197. hdl:2152/31175. JSTOR 663197. PMID 22173468. S2CID 1963316.
- Marlowe, F. W. (2010). The Hadza: Hunter-gatherers of Tanzania. University of California Press.
- Marshall, L. (1976). The !Kung of Nyae Nyae. Harvard University Press.
- Maynard Smith, John (1994). "Must reliable signals always be costly?". Animal Behaviour. 47 (5): 1115–1120. doi:10.1006/anbe.1994.1149. S2CID 54274718.
- Maynard Smith, John; Harper, David (2003). Animal Signals. Oxford University Press.
- McElreath, R.; Boyd, R. (2007). Mathematical Models of Social Evolution. University of Chicago Press.
- McGraw, K. J.; Ardia, D. R. (2003). "Carotenoids, immunocompetence, and the information content of sexual colors: An experimental test". Am. Nat. 162 (6): 704–712. doi:10.1086/378904. PMID 14737708. S2CID 1854401.
- Møller, A. P.; Pomiankowski, A. (1993). "Why have birds got multiple sexual ornaments?". Behavioral Ecology and Sociobiology. 32 (3): 167–176. doi:10.1007/bf00173774. S2CID 25591725.
- Møller, A. P. (1994). Sexual selection and the barn swallow. Oxford University Press.
- Nell, V. (2002). "Why Young Men Drive Dangerously: Implications for Injury Prevention". Current Directions in Psychological Science. 11 (2): 75–79. doi:10.1111/1467-8721.00172. S2CID 67829895.
- Nur, N.; Hasson, O (1984). "Phenotypic plasticity and the handicap principle". Journal of Theoretical Biology. 110 (2): 275–297. Bibcode:1984JThBi.110..275N. doi:10.1016/S0022-5193(84)80059-4.
- Pomiankowski, Andrew; Iwasa, Yoh (1993). "Evolution of Multiple Sexual Preferences by Fisher's Runaway Process of Natural Selection". Proceedings of the Royal Society B: Biological Sciences. 253 (1337): 173–181. doi:10.1098/rspb.1993.0099. JSTOR 49806. S2CID 53617849.
- Rees, T. (2009). "Is Personal Insecurity a Cause of Cross-National Differences in the Intensity of Religious Belief?" (PDF). Journal of Religion and Society. 11: 1–24. CiteSeerX 10.1.1.170.310. Archived from the original (PDF) on 2013-12-30.
- Schreiber, G.; Schlumpf, K.; Glynn, S.; Wright, D.; Tu, Y.; King, M.; Higgins, M.; Kessler, D.; Gilcher, R.; et al. (2006). "Convenience, the Bane of Our Existence, and Other Barriers to Donating". Transfusion. 46 (4): 545–553. doi:10.1111/j.1537-2995.2006.00757.x. PMID 16584430. S2CID 11169811.
- Schuurmans-Stekhoven, James (2016). "Are we, like sheep, going astray: is costly signaling (or any other mechanism) necessary to explain the belief-as-benefit effect?". Religion, Brain & Behavior. 7 (3): 258–262. doi:10.1080/2153599X.2016.1156558. S2CID 88890309.
- Searcy, W. A.; Nowicki, S. (2005). The evolution of animal communication: reliability and deception in signaling systems. Princeton University Press. ISBN 978-0-691-07095-7.
- Shostak, M. (1981). Nisa: the life and words of a !Kung Woman. Harvard University Press.
- Smith, E. A.; Bliege Bird, R. (2000). "Turtle hunting and tombstone opening: public generosity as costly signaling". Evol Hum Behav. 21 (4): 245–261. Bibcode:2000EHumB..21..245S. doi:10.1016/S1090-5138(00)00031-3. PMID 10899477.
- Smith, E.; Bliege Bird, R.; Bird, D. (2002). "The Benefits of Costly Signaling: Meriam Turtle Hunters". Behavioral Ecology. 14 (1): 116–126. doi:10.1093/beheco/14.1.116.
- Sosis, R. (1997). The Collective Action Problem of Male Cooperative Labor on Ifaluk Atoll. University of New Mexico (PhD Thesis).
- Sosis, R.; Feldstein, S.; Hill, K. (1998). "Bargaining theory and cooperative fishing participation on Ifaluk Atoll". Human Nature. 9 (2): 163–203. doi:10.1007/s12110-998-1002-5. PMID 26197444. S2CID 11355960.
- Sosis, R. (2000a). "Costly signaling and torch fishing on Ifaluk Atoll". Evolution and Human Behavior. 21 (4): 223–244. Bibcode:2000EHumB..21..223S. doi:10.1016/S1090-5138(00)00030-1. PMID 10899476.
- Sosis, R. (2000b). "Religion and intra-group cooperation: preliminary results of a comparative analysis of utopian communities". Cross-Cultural Research. 34: 70–87. CiteSeerX 10.1.1.531.1005. doi:10.1177/106939710003400105. S2CID 44050390.
- Sosis, R.; Bressler, E. (2003). "Cooperation and commune longevity: a test of the costly signaling theory of religion". Cross-Cultural Research. 37 (2): 211–239. doi:10.1177/1069397103037002003. S2CID 7908906.
- Sosis, R. (2003). "Signaling, Solidarity, and the Sacred: The Evolution of Religious Behavior". Evolutionary Anthropology. 12 (6): 264–274. doi:10.1002/evan.10120. S2CID 443130.
- Spence, A.M. (1974). Market Signaling, Information Transfer in Hiring and Related Processes. Harvard University Press. ISBN 978-0-674-54990-6.
- Steadman, L.; Palmer, C. (2008). The Supernatural and Natural Selection: Religion and Evolutionary Success. Paradigm.
- Stevens, M.; Ruxton, G. D. (2012). "Linking the evolution and form of warning coloration in nature". Proceedings of the Royal Society B: Biological Sciences. 279 (1728): 417–426. doi:10.1098/rspb.2011.1932. PMC 3234570. PMID 22113031.
- Tazzyman, Samuel J.; Iwasa, Yoh; Pomiankowski, Andrew (2014). "The Handicap Process Favors Exaggerated, Rather than Reduced, Sexual Ornaments". Evolution. 68 (9): 2534–2549. doi:10.1111/evo.12450. PMC 4277338. PMID 24837599.
- Thomas, E.M. (1959). The harmless people. Knopf.
- Tuzin, D. (1982). G. H. Herdt (ed.). Ritual Violence among the Ilahita Arapesh. University of California Press. 321–356.
- Veblen, T. (1899). The Theory of the Leisure Class: an Economic Study of Institutions. Penguin.
- Vonnegut, Kurt (October 1961). "Harrison Bergeron". Fan. Science Fiction Magazine: 5–10.
- Wiessner, P. (1996). Wiessner, P.; Schiefenhovel, W. (eds.). Leveling the hunter: constraints on the status quest in foraging societies. Berghahn. pp. 171–192.
- Wiessner, P. (2002). "Hunting, healing, and hxaro exchange: A long-term perspective on !Kung (Ju/'hoansi) large-game hunting". Evol Hum Behav. 23 (6): 407–436. Bibcode:2002EHumB..23..407W. doi:10.1016/S1090-5138(02)00096-X.
- Wood, Connor (2016). "Ritual well-being: toward a social signaling model of religion and mental health". Religion, Brain & Behavior. 7 (3): 258–262. doi:10.1080/2153599X.2016.1156558. S2CID 88890309.
- Zahavi, Amotz (1975). "Mate selection — a selection for a handicap". Journal of Theoretical Biology. 53 (1): 205–214. Bibcode:1975JThBi..53..205Z. CiteSeerX 10.1.1.586.3819. doi:10.1016/0022-5193(75)90111-3. PMID 1195756.
- Zahavi, Amotz (1977). "Reliability in communication systems and the evolution of altruism". In Stonehouse, B.; Perrins, C.M. (eds.). Evolutionary Ecology. Macmillan. pp. 253–259. doi:10.1007/978-1-349-05226-4_21. ISBN 978-0-333-28161-1.
- Zahavi, Amotz (1997). The Handicap Principle. Oxford University Press. ISBN 978-0-19-510035-8.

=== Further reading ===
- Zahavi, Amotz (1977). "The cost of honesty (Further remarks on the handicap principle)". Journal of Theoretical Biology. 67 (3): 603–605. Bibcode:1977JThBi..67..603Z. doi:10.1016/0022-5193(77)90061-3. PMID 904334.
- Zahavi, Amotz (1977). "The Testing of the Bond". Animal Behaviour. 25: 246–247. doi:10.1016/0003-3472(77)90089-6. S2CID 53197593.
