= Conspicuous consumption =

Concept in sociology and economy

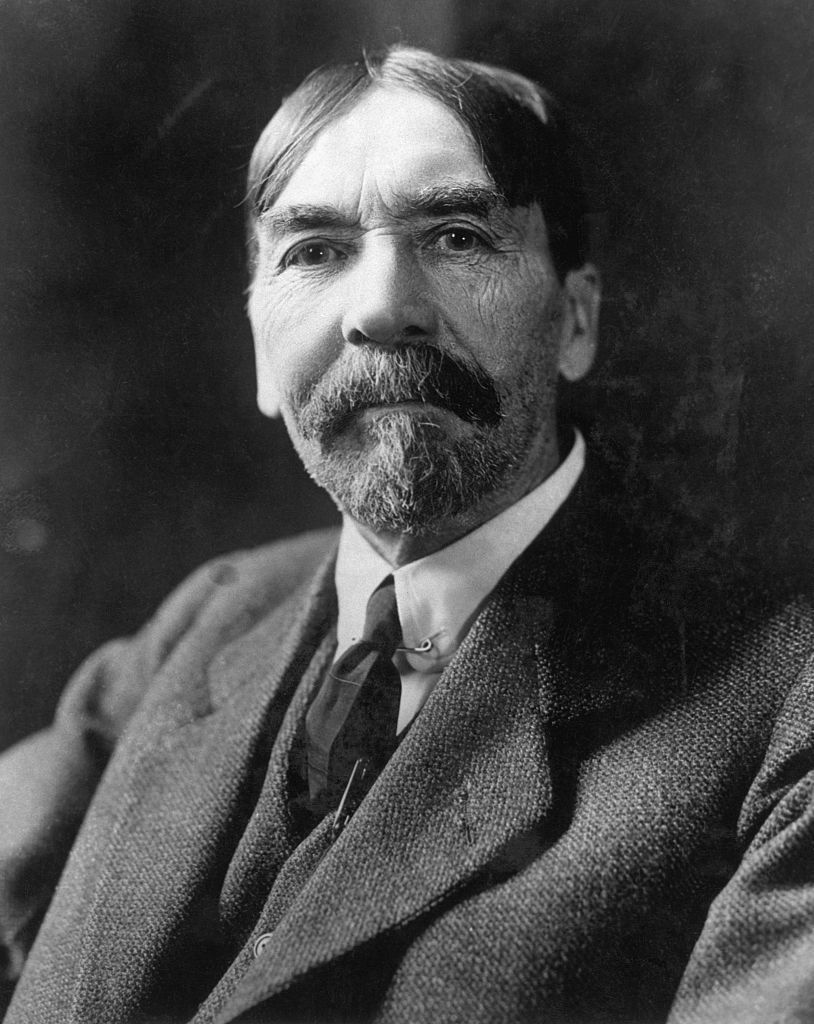
The sociologist and economist Thorstein Veblen coined the term "conspicuous consumption", and was a pioneer of the institutional economics movement.

In sociology and in economics, the term conspicuous consumption describes and explains the consumer practice of buying and using goods of a higher quality, price, or in greater quantity than practical. In 1899, the sociologist Thorstein Veblen coined the term conspicuous consumption to explain the spending of money on and the acquiring of luxury commodities (goods and services) specifically as a public display of economic power—the income and the accumulated wealth—of the buyer. To the conspicuous consumer, the public display of discretionary income is an economic means of either attaining or maintaining a given social status.

The development of Veblen's sociology of conspicuous consumption also identified and described other economic behaviours such as invidious consumption, which is the ostentatious consumption of goods, an action meant to provoke the envy of other people; and conspicuous compassion, the ostentatious use of charity meant to enhance the reputation and social prestige of the donor; thus the socio-economic practices of consumerism derive from conspicuous consumption.

== History and development ==
In The Theory of the Leisure Class: An Economic Study in the Evolution of Institutions (1899), Thorstein Veblen identified, described, and explained the behavioural characteristics of the nouveau riche (new rich) social class that emerged from capital accumulation during the Second Industrial Revolution (1860–1914). In that 19th-century social and historical context, the term "conspicuous consumption" applied narrowly in association with the men, women, and families of the upper class who applied their great wealth as a means of publicly manifesting their social power and prestige, either real or perceived. The strength of one's reputation is in direct relationship to the amount of money possessed and displayed; that is to say, the basis "of gaining and retaining a good name, are leisure and conspicuous consumption."

In the 1920s, economists such as Paul Nystrom proposed that changes in lifestyle as result of the industrial age led to massive expansion of the "pecuniary emulation." That conspicuous consumption had induced in the mass of society a "philosophy of futility" that would increase the consumption of goods and services as a social fashion; consumption for the sake of consumption.

In 1949, James Duesenberry proposed the "demonstration effect" and the "bandwagon effect", whereby a person's conspicuous consumption psychologically depends upon the actual level of spending, but also depends upon the degree of his or her spending, when compared with and to the spending of other people. That the conspicuous consumer is motivated by the importance, to him or to her, of the opinion of the social and economic reference groups for whom he or she are performed the conspicuous consumption.

=== Social class and consumption ===
Veblen said that conspicuous consumption comprised socio-economic behaviours practised by rich people as activities usual and exclusive to people with much disposable income; yet a variation of Veblen's theory is presented in the conspicuous consumption behaviours that are very common to the middle class and to the working class, regardless of the person's race and ethnic group. Such upper-class economic behaviour is especially common in societies with emerging economies in which the conspicuous consumption of goods and services ostentatiously signals that the buyer rose from poverty and has something to prove to society.

In The Millionaire Next Door: The Surprising Secrets of America's Wealthy (1996), Thomas J. Stanley and William D. Danko reported conspicuous frugality, another variation of Veblen's social-class relation to conspicuous consumption. That Americans with a net worth of more than a million dollars usually avoid conspicuous consumption, and tend to practise frugality, such as paying cash for a used car rather using credit, in order to avoid material depreciation and paying interest upon a car loan.

== Consumerism theory ==
Since the 19th century, conspicuous consumption explains the psychology behind the economics of a consumer society, and the increase in the types of goods and services that people consider necessary to and for their lives in a developed economy. Supporting interpretations and explanations of contemporary conspicuous consumption are presented in Consumer Culture (1996) by Celia Lury, Consumer Culture and Modernity (1997) by Don Slater, Symbolic Exchange and Death (1998) by Jean Baudrillard, and Spent: Sex, Evolution, and the Secrets of Consumerism (2009) by Geoffrey Miller.

Moreover, D. Hebdige, in Hiding in the Light (1994), proposes that conspicuous consumption is a form of displaying a personal identity, and a consequent function of advertising, as proposed in Ads, Fads, and Consumer Culture (2000), by A. A. Berger. Each variant interpretation and complementary explanation is derived from Veblen's original sociologic proposition in The Theory of the Leisure Class: that conspicuous consumption is a psychological end in itself, from which the practitioner (man, woman, family) derived the honour of superior social status.

== Materialism and gender ==
In An Examination of Materialism, Conspicuous Consumption and Gender Differences (2013), the researchers Brenda Segal and Jeffrey S. Podoshen reported great differences in the consumerism practised by men and women. The data about materialism and impulse purchases of 1,180 Americans indicate that men have greater scores for materialism and conspicuous consumption; and that women tended to buy goods and services on impulse; and both sexes were equally loyal to a given brand of goods and services.

== Distinctions of type ==
The term conspicuous consumption denotes the act of buying something, especially something expensive, that is not necessary to one's life, in a noticeable way. Scholar Andrew Trigg (2001) defined conspicuous consumption as behaviour by which one can display great wealth, by means of idleness—expending much time in the practice of leisure activities, and spending much money to consume luxury goods and services.

Conspicuous compassion, the practice of publicly donating large sums of money to charity to enhance the social prestige of the donor, is sometimes described as a type of conspicuous consumption. This behaviour has long been recognised and sometimes attacked—for example, the New Testament story Lesson of the widow's mite criticises wealthy people who make large donations ostentatiously, while praising poorer people who make small but comparatively more difficult donations in private.

Possible motivations for conspicuous consumption include:

- Demonstration/bandwagon effect — In the book Income, Saving and the Theory of Consumer Behavior (1949), James Duesenberry proposed that a person's conspicuous consumption psychologically depends not only upon the actual level of spending, but also upon the degree of his or her spending, as compared with the spending of other people. Thus the conspicuous consumer is motivated by the importance, to him or to her, of the opinion of the social and economic reference groups for whom are performed the patterns of conspicuous consumption.
- Aggressive ostentation — In a 2006 CBSNews.com article, Dick Meyer said that conspicuous consumption is a form of anger towards society, an "aggressive ostentation" that is an antisocial behaviour, which arose from the social alienation suffered by men, women, and families who feel they have become anonymous in and to their societies. This feeling of alienation is aggravated by the decay of the communitarian ethic essential to a person feeling him or herself part of the whole society.
- Shelter and transport — In the United States, the trend towards building houses that were larger than needed by a nuclear family began in the 1950s. Decades later, in the year 2000, that practice of conspicuous consumption resulted in people buying houses that were double the average size needed to comfortably house a nuclear family. Negative consequences of either buying or building an oversized house might include:
  - the loss of or reduction in the family's domestic recreational space—the backyard and the front yard;
  - the spending of old-age retirement funds to pay for a too-big house;
  - over-long commuting time, from house to job, and vice versa, because the required plot of land was unavailable near a city.

Oversized houses facilitated other forms of conspicuous consumption, such as an oversized garage for the family's oversized motor vehicles or buying more clothing to fill larger clothes closets. Conspicuous consumption becomes a self-generating cycle of spending money for the sake of social prestige. Analogous to the consumer trend for oversized houses is the trend towards buying oversized light trucks, specifically the off-road sport utility vehicle type (cf. station wagon/estate car), as a form of psychologically comforting conspicuous consumption, because such large vehicles usually are bought by city-dwellers, an urban nuclear family.

- Prestige – In a 1999 article, Jacqueline Eastman, Ronald Goldsmith, and Leisa Reinecke Flynn said that status consumption is based upon conspicuous consumption; however, the literature of contemporary marketing does not establish definitive meanings for the terms status consumption and conspicuous consumption. Moreover, A. O'Cass and H. Frost (2002) claim that sociologists often incorrectly used the two terms as interchangeable and equivalent terms. In a later study, O'Cass and Frost determined that, as sociological constructs, the terms status consumption and conspicuous consumption denote different sociological behaviours. About the ambiguities of denotation and connotation of the term conspicuous consumption, R. Mason (1984) reported that the classical, general theories of consumer decision-processes do not readily accommodate the construct of "conspicuous consumption", because the nature of said socio-economic behaviours varies according to the social class and the economic group studied.
- Motivations – Paurav Shukla (2010) says that, whilst marketing and sales researchers recognise the importance of the buyer's social and psychological environment, the definition of the term status-directed consumption remains ambiguous, because the development of a comprehensive general theory requires that social scientists accept two fundamental assumptions, which usually do not concord. First, though the "rational" (economic) and the "irrational" (psychologic) elements of consumer decision-making often influence a person's decision to buy particular goods and services, marketing and sales researchers usually consider the rational element dominant in a person's decision to buy the particular goods and services. Second, the consumer perceives the utility of the product (the goods, the services) as a prime consideration in evaluating its usefulness, i.e. the reason to buy the product. These assumptions, required for the development of a general theory of brand selection and brand purchase, are problematic, because the resultant theories tend either to misunderstand or to ignore the "irrational" element in the behaviour of the buyer-as-consumer; and because conspicuous consumption is a behaviour predominantly "psychological" in motivation and expression, Therefore, a comprehensive, general theory of conspicuous consumption would require a separate construct for the psychological (irrational) elements of the socio-economic phenomenon that is conspicuous consumption.

== Examples ==
Conspicuous consumption is exemplified by purchasing goods that are exclusively designed to serve as symbols of wealth, such as luxury-brand clothing, high-tech tools, and vehicles.

=== Luxury fashion ===
Materialistic consumers are likely to engage in conspicuous luxury consumption. The global yearly revenue of the luxury fashion industry was €1.64 trillion in 2019. Buying of conspicuous goods is likely to be influenced by the spending habits of others. This view of luxury conspicuous consumption is being incorporated into social media platforms which is impacting consumer behaviour. During periods of economic downturn, consumers tend to turn away from "logomania" products and instead purchase luxury goods that signal affluence more subtly.

== Criticism ==
In 1919, the journalist H. L. Mencken addressed the sociological and psychological particulars of the socio-economic behaviours that are conspicuous consumption, by asking:

Do I enjoy a decent bath because I know that John Smith cannot afford one—or because I delight in being clean? Do I admire Beethoven's Fifth Symphony because it is incomprehensible to Congressmen and Methodists—or because I genuinely love music? Do I prefer terrapin à la Maryland to fried liver because plowhands must put up with the liver—or because the terrapin is intrinsically a more charming dose? Do I prefer kissing a pretty girl to kissing a charwoman, because even a janitor may kiss a charwoman—or because the pretty girl looks better, smells better, and kisses better?

=== Inequality and debt ===
In The Theory of the Leisure Class (1899) Veblen said that "among the motives which lead men to accumulate wealth, the primacy, both in scope and intensity, therefore, continues to belong to this motive of pecuniary emulation of the rich". In the study "Borrowing to Keep Up (with the Joneses): Inequality, Debt, and Conspicuous Consumption" (2020), Sheheryar Banuri and Ha Nguyen reported three findings:

- Consumption tends to increase when the buying and the using of goods and services is conspicuous: Consumption signals status to other people.
- Conspicuous consumption increases the frequency of borrowing money: Poor people take out loans in order to compete at consumption.
- Economic inequality is worsened with access to credit: Poor people borrow money in order to signal status, which becomes a vicious circle.

The findings that Banuri and Nguyen reported indicate that the cyclical effect of borrowing money for conspicuous consumption leads to and perpetuates economic inequality. That poor people imitate, try to match, and emulate the consumption patterns of rich people in order to increase their social status, and perhaps rise in society. That such socio-economic behaviours, facilitated by easy access to credit, generate macroeconomic volatility and support Veblen's concept of pecuniary emulation used to finance a person's social standing.

Other research supports these and similar results. For example income inequality has been found to be associated with reduced savings rates. One hypothesized mechanism for this relationship is 'expenditure cascades' whereby consumption norms are set by the relatively wealthy, who then have more income and consumption relative to others as inequality rises. This emulation of the consumption norms of relatively wealthy peers is supported by a large literature.

One complication found in the macro literature is that the link between inequality and savings may depend on context, in particular on the degree of financialisation. When the degree of financialisation is high, inequality tends to reduce the national savings rate as the emulation effect is more powerful when finance is readily available, but the opposite effect may occur when financialisation is low as the emulation effect is weak, and the rich tend to save at a higher rate than the poor. The effect of inequality on savings is also found to be positive in Asia, where financialization is lower. The relationship is also found to depend on economic policy and institutions. For example inequality appears to lower savings in 'liberal market economies' but to rather reduce aggregate demand in 'coordinated market economies'.

In the case where inequality lowers savings, and increases leverage and a tendency to run large current account imbalances via the expenditure cascade mechanism, this has been associated with more frequent and/or severe economic crisis.

== Solutions ==
In the case of conspicuous consumption, taxes upon luxury goods diminish societal expenditures on high-status goods, by rendering them more expensive than non-positional goods. In this sense, luxury taxes can be seen as a Pigouvian tax correcting market failure—with an apparent negative deadweight loss, these taxes are a more efficient mechanism for increasing revenue than 'distorting' labour or capital taxes. A luxury tax applied to goods and services for conspicuous consumption is a type of progressive sales tax that at least partially corrects the negative externality associated with the conspicuous consumption of positional goods. In Utility from Accumulation (2009), Louis Kaplow said that assets exercise an objective social-utility function, i.e. the rich man and the rich woman hoard material assets, because the hoard, itself, functions as status goods that establish his and her socio-economic position within society. When utility is derived directly from accumulation of assets, this lowers the dead weight loss associated with inheritance taxes and raises the optimal rate of inheritance taxation.

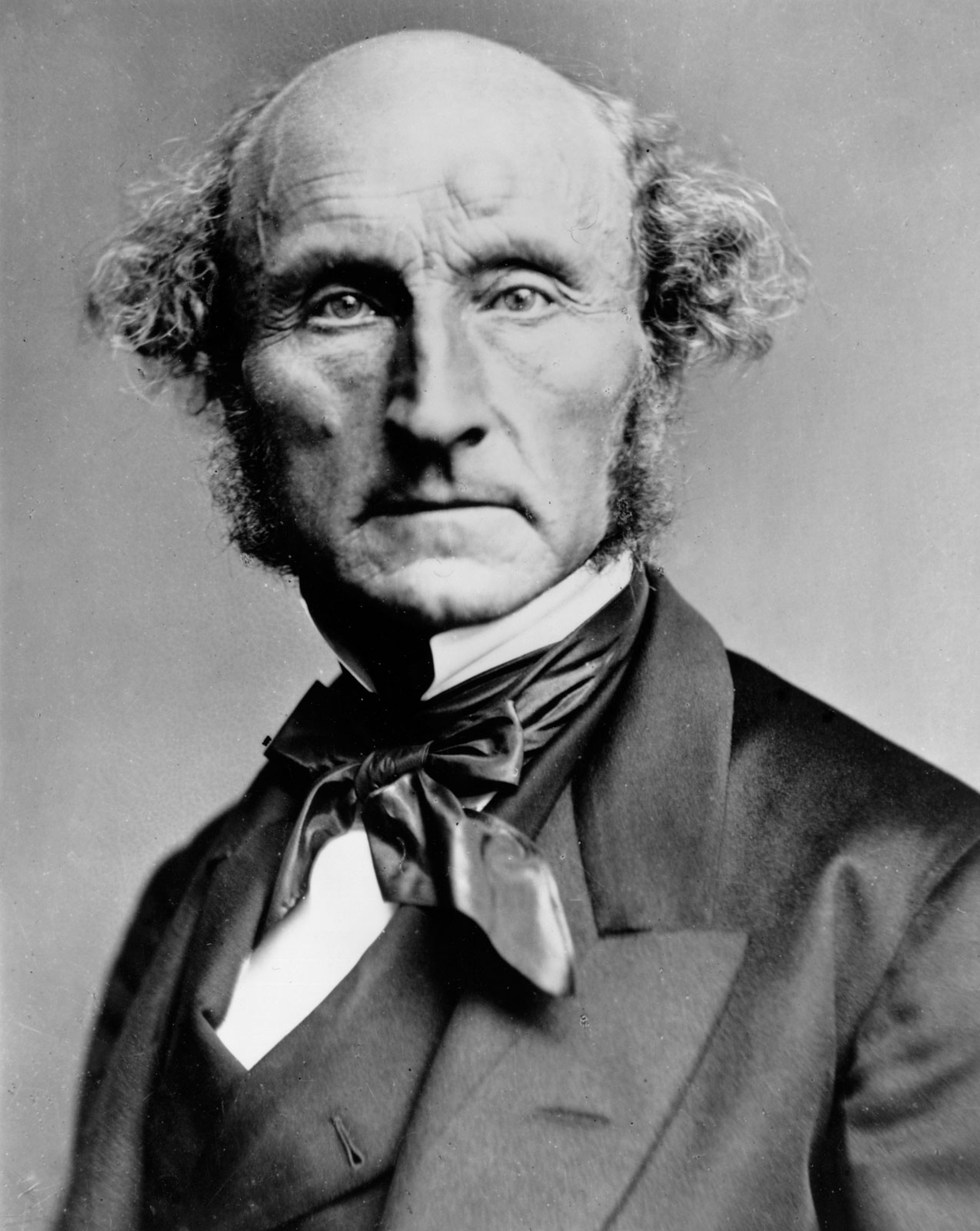
In the 19th century, the philosopher John Stuart Mill recommended taxing the practice of conspicuous consumption.

In place of luxury taxes, economist Robert H. Frank proposed the application of a progressive consumption tax; in a 1998 New York Times article, John Tierney said that as a remedy for the social and psychological malaise that is conspicuous consumption, the personal income tax should be replaced with a progressive tax upon the yearly sum of discretionary income spent on the conspicuous consumption of goods and services. Another option is the redistribution of wealth, either by means of an incomes policy – for example the conscious efforts to promote wage compression under variants of social corporatism such as the Rehn–Meidner model and/or by some mix of progressive taxation and transfer policies, and provision of public goods. When individuals are concerned with their relative income or consumption in comparison to their peers, the optimal degree of public good provision and of progression of the tax system is raised. Because the activity of conspicuous consumption, itself, is a form of superior good, diminishing the income inequality of the income distribution by way of an egalitarian policy reduces the conspicuous consumption of positional goods and services. In Wealth and Welfare (1912), the economist A. C. Pigou said that the redistribution of wealth might lead to great gains in social welfare:

Now the part played by comparative, as distinguished from absolute, income is likely to be small for incomes that only suffice to provide the necessaries and primary comforts of life, but to be large with large incomes. In other words, a larger proportion of the satisfaction yielded by the incomes of rich people comes from their relative, rather than from their absolute, amount. This part of it will not be destroyed if the incomes of all rich people are diminished together. The loss of economic welfare suffered by the rich when command over resources is transferred from them to the poor will, therefore, be substantially smaller relatively to the gain of economic welfare to the poor than a consideration of the law of diminishing utility taken by itself suggests.

The economic case for the taxation of positional, luxury goods has a long history; in the mid-19th century, in Principles of Political Economy with some of their Applications to Social Philosophy (1848), John Stuart Mill said:

I disclaim all asceticism, and by no means wish to see discouraged, either by law or opinion, any indulgence which is sought from a genuine inclination for, any enjoyment of, the thing itself; but a great portion of the expenses of the higher and middle classes in most countries ... is not incurred for the sake of the pleasure afforded by the things on which the money is spent, but from regard to opinion, and an idea that certain expenses are expected from them, as an appendage of station; and I cannot but think that expenditure of this sort is a most desirable subject of taxation. If taxation discourages it, some good is done, and if not, no harm; for in so far as taxes are levied on things which are desired and possessed from motives of this description, nobody is the worse for them. When a thing is bought not for its use but for its costliness, cheapness is no recommendation.

In the case where conspicuous consumption mediates a link between inequality and unsustainable borrowing, one suggested policy response is tighter financial regulation.

"Conspicuous non-consumption" is a phrase used to describe a conscious choice to opt out of consumption with the intention of sending deliberate social signals.

== See also ==
- Affluenza
- Anti-consumerism
- Bling
- Class consciousness
- Commodity fetishism
- Conspicuous conservation
- Conspicuous leisure
- Costly signaling theory in evolutionary psychology
- Elitism
- Frugality
- Giffen good
- Handicap principle
- Haul video
- Hoarding
- Izikhothane
- Keeping up with the Joneses
- Materialism
- Mottainai
- Post-purchase rationalization
- Potlatch
- Prestige pricing
- Sign value
- Signalling theory
- Simple living
- Status symbol
- Structural functionalism
- Sumptuary law
- Sumptuary taxes
- Surplus economics
- Veblen good
