= Izikhothane =

South African competition to determine which party is wealthier

Izikhothane (Ukukhothana), or rather Skhothane, refers to South African showmanship or dance battles in which individuals or groups compete in front of large crowds to determine by conspicuous consumption which party is wealthier. These 'battles' are performed using material items such as money, mobile phones, clothes, alcohol or foods. In most instances a battle is won by the intentional destruction or wastage of one's own expensive items to demonstrate the lack of concern for such material possessions due to the ability to afford more of the same. A competitor's chances of victory are improved by having items that are more expensive than those of their opponent it can be money or clothes. Some of the Izikhothanes are from Botswana (Fearless Mosha).

== Origin ==
The word "Izikhothane" is a slang word that originates from the Zulu word "Osikhotheni". Osikhotheni means people who live in the bushes/bundus, and that is derived from the Zulu word "Isikhotha" which means "bush". The singular form of this word is "usikhotheni". This term is township slang for hustlers who live a lavish lifestyle (nice expensive clothes etc.) without having a job or owning a business. You can call them modernised beggars who live by using illegal ways to satisfy their hunger for their lavish lifestyles.

Izikhothane originated in the early 2000s in the South African townships of Ekurhuleni Metropolitan previously known as the Eastrand, but mainly started in Katlehong, one of the townships in Eastrand. The act remained largely unnoticed until it gained popularity in 2011 and 2012. A similar trend called uSwenka existed in South Africa in the 1950s where migrant workers and labourers dressed themselves in their finest suits and shoes to compete in contests. The winner of these contests would win money, household necessities or livestock, which they would send back home to their families.

== Practices ==
The Izikhothane are usually from impoverished backgrounds and spend beyond their financial means to purchase high-end designer apparel, prestige branded alcohol, luxury food items, and expensive accessories including jewellery and mobile phones. These items are then destroyed or disposed of in an attempt to create a perception of opulence and thereby gain social status.

In Eastern Cape this culture is mostly joined at 11 to 18 years old. The purpose of the culture is to impress and making your clan famous. The members make battles of showing off tags and dancing with other groups to make themselves famous. In P.E. the culture mostly includes music in it. The members end up dissing each other's in terms of challenging. In Eastern Cape a Clan called Kallawa Jewish is the most famous group in the Eastern cape and also Skeem Seh Njabulo, in Jeffreys Bay is Smart Fellaz. Hankey got the elderly clan called Mpolo Trend. The members get money in different ways. Uitenhage got a clan called smart Vegas that is really famous. Eastern cape got the mostly talented clans for example Innocent Squad (also known as Obhuti abamsulwa) is one of the clan with its own recording studio (Omthina fam). As the Producer and the member of the clan meets Young Talents International, he said "I am very glad to be in my clan. My wish is us to be the example of our fellow clans. Grow and glow. Be wise, stop wasting and save for the future" said Blessing Brighter mostly known as Jostar. In other ways community don't support this culture but it never stopped. In Eastern Cape, Carvela is mostly worn in terms of showing you afford. They always show themselves in Public places for attention and makes Saturday a big day for them.

The ability to afford expensive clothing is fundamental to Izikhothane and one's reputation is determined by this expression. The Izikhothane sometimes demonstrate this by buying two pairs of the same high-end brand of shoe in different colours and then wearing one shoe of each colour to indicate that two pairs of the same expensive shoe can be afforded. Another tactic in battle is to wear expensive clothing in layers and then destroy one layer at a time thereby destroying more clothes than the opponent. Price tags are sometimes retained on the clothing so that competitors can flaunt the cost of their items.

== Battles ==
The aim of the dance battle is to show more abundance than your opponents as this determines the winner of the battle. There is no tangible reward for winning an Izikhothane battle, just the recognition and affection from the audience that witnesses the battle.

Izikhothane battles occur predominantly across South Africa's townships. The act or battle is performed in a public place such as a park or any open space so that large crowds may gather to witness the event.

Competitors were predominantly males aged between 12 and 25 years. The popularity of Izikhothane also started to attract female youth (Material.Mix and Material.Prix). Izikhothane groups compete against each other in inter- or intra-township battles. A group's identity and reputation is upheld by its members' wasteful extravagance.

To perform in an Izikhothane battle, a contestant must purchase expensive items such as clothing, shoes, alcohol and exorbitant accessories. Loud, colourful, branded items are a necessity. The more a competitor's gear costs, the more dominant they are able to be in the battle. Once at the battle venue, the contestant calls out an opponent. Thereafter these two competitors dance around, showing off their expensive material items to each other and to the crowd. To win the battle, a contestant may be required to destroy their items such as tearing up cash notes, burning or tearing up their designer branded clothing, pouring out expensive alcohol or custard onto the ground and submerging their mobile phones in water. The champions are decided by the crowd whereby the crowd cheers for the Izikhothane that impressed them the most with their abundance of wealth as depicted by the destruction of their high-value items.

== See also ==
- Competitive altruism
- Koha, a similar concept among the Māori
- Moka exchange, a similar concept in Papua New Guinea
- Potlatch
- Potluck
- Pow wow, a gathering whose name is derived from the Narragansett word for "spiritual leader"
