= List of bibliographical materials on the potlatch =

Below is a list of books and sources about the potlatch, an Indigenous ceremony from the north west coast of Canada, and the United States.

== General ==
- Barnett, Homer G. (1938) "The Nature of the Potlatch." American Anthropologist. vol. 40, no. 3, pp. 349–358.
- Bracken, Christopher (1997) The Potlatch Papers: A Colonial Case History. Chicago: University of Chicago Press.
- Cole, Douglas, and Ira Chaikin (1990) An Iron Hand upon the People: The Law against the Potlatch on the Northwest Coast. Vancouver: Douglas & McIntyre. ISBN 0-295-97050-2
- Mauss, Marcel (2002) "The Gift." London: Routledge.
- Rosman, Abraham, and Paula G. Rubel (1971) Feasting with Mine Enemy: Rank and Exchange among Northwest Coast Societies. Prospect Heights, Illinois: Waveland Press.
- Rubel, Paula G., and Abraham Rosman (1983) "The Evolution of Exchange Structures and Ranking: Some Northwest Coast and Athapaskan Examples." Journal of Anthropological Research, vol. 39, no. 1, pp. 1–25.

== Tlingit ==
- de Laguna, Frederica (1972) Under Mount Saint Elias: The History and Culture of the Yakutat Tlingit. Washington: Smithsonian Institution Press.
- Emmons, George Thornton (1991) The Tlingit Indians. Ed. by Frederica de Laguna. Seattle: University of Washington Press.
- Kan, Sergei (1989) Symbolic Immortality: The Tlingit Potlatch of the Nineteenth Century. Washington: Smithsonian Books. ISBN 1-56098-309-4.
- Dauenhauer, Nora Marks, and Richard Dauenhauer (eds.) (1990) Haa Tuwanáagu Yís, for Healing Our Spirit: Tlingit Oratory. (Classics of Tlingit Oral Literature, vol. 2.) Seattle: University of Washington Press.

== Haida ==
- Boelscher, Marianne (1988) The Curtain Within: Haida Social and Mythical Discourse. Vancouver: University of British Columbia Press.
- Stearns, Mary Lee (1981) Haida Culture in Custody: The Masset Band. Seattle: University of Washington Press.
- Steltzer, Ulli (1984) A Haida Potlatch. Seattle: University of Washington Press.

== Tsimshianic-speakers ==
- Adams, John W. (1973) The Gitksan Potlatch: Population Flux, Resource Ownership and Reciprocity. Toronto: Holt, Rinehart, and Winston of Canada.
- Beynon, William (2000) Potlatch at Gitsegukla: William Beynon’s 1945 Field Notebooks. Ed. by Margaret Anderson and Marjorie Halpin. Vancouver: UBC Press.
- Boas, Franz (1916) Tsimshian Mythology. Washington: Government Printing Office.
- Daly, Richard (2005) Our Box Was Full: An Ethnography for the Delgamuukw Plaintiffs. Vancouver: UBC Press.
- "Fur Trader, A" (Peter Skene Ogden) (1933) Traits of American Indian Life and Character. San Francisco: Grabhorn Press. Reprinted, Dover Publications, 1995. (Ch. 4 is the earliest known description of a Nisga'a potlatch.)
- Garfield, Viola E. (1939) "Tsimshian Clan and Society." University of Washington Publications in Anthropology, vol. 7, no. 3, pp. 167–340.
- Glavin, Terry (1990) A Death Feast in Dimlahamid. Vancouver: New Star Books.
- Grumet, Robert Stephen (1975) "Changes in Coast Tsimshian Redistributive Activities in the Fort Simpson Region of British Columbia, 1788-1862." Ethnohistory, vol. 22, no. 4, pp. 294–318.
- Hoyt-Goldsmith, Diane (1997) Potlatch: A Tsimshian Celebration. New York: Holiday House.
- McDonald, James A. (1990) "Poles, Potlatching, and Public Affairs: The Use of Aboriginal Culture in Development." Culture, vol. 10, no. 2, pp. 103–120.
- McDonald, James A. (1995) "Building a Moral Community: Tsimshian Potlatching, Implicit Knowledge and Everyday Experiences." Cultural Studies, vol. 9, no. 1, pp. 125–144.
- McDonald, James A. (2003) People of the Robin: The Tsimshian of Kitsumkalum. CCI Press and Alberta ACADRE Network.
- McNeary, Stephen A. (1976) Where Fire Came Down: Social and Economic Life of the Niska. Ph.D. diss., Bryn Mawr College, Bryn Mawr, Penn.
- Pierce, William Henry (1933) From Potlatch to Pulpit. Vancouver: Vancouver Bindery.
- Roth, Christopher F. (2002) "Goods, Names, and Selves: Rethinking the Tsimshian Potlatch." American Ethnologist, vol. 29, no. 1, pp. 123–150.
- Seguin, Margaret (ed.) (1984) The Tsimshian: Images of the Past: Views for the Present. Vancouver: University of British Columbia Press.
- Seguin, Margaret (1985) Interpretive Contexts for Traditional and Current Coast Tsimshian Feasts. Ottawa: National Museums of Canada.
- Seguin, Margaret (1986) "Understanding Tsimshian 'Potlatch.'" In: Native Peoples: The Canadian Experience, ed. by R. Bruce Morrison and C. Roderick Wilson, pp. 473–500. Toronto: McClelland and Stewart.
- Vaughan, J. Daniel (1984) "Tsimshian Potlatch and Society: Examining a Structural Analysis." In: The Tsimshian and Their Neighbors of the North Pacific Coast, ed. by Jay Miller and Carol M. Eastman, pp. 58–68. Seattle: University of Washington Press.

== Kwakwaka'wakw ==
- Benedict, Ruth (1934) Patterns of Culture. Boston: Houghton Mifflin.
- Boas, Franz (1897) "The Social Organization and the Secret Societies of the Kwakiutl Indians." pp. 311–738 In: Report of the U.S. National Museum for 1895, pp. 311–738. Washington.
- Boas, Franz (1966) Kwakiutl Ethnography. Ed. by Helen Codere. Chicago: University of Chicago Press.
- Codere, Helen (1950) Fighting with Property: A Study of Kwakiutl Potlatching and Warfare, 1792-1930. New York: J. J. Augustin.
- Codere, Helen (1956) "The Amiable Side of Kwakiutl Life: The Potlatch and the Play Potlatch." American Anthropologist, vol. 28, pp. 334–351.
- Drucker, Philip, and Robert F. Heizer (1967) To Make My Name Good: A Reexamination of the Southern Kwakiutl Potlatch. Berkeley: University of California Press.
- Goldman, Irving (1975) The Mouth of Heaven: An Introduction to Kwakiutl Religious Thought. Huntington, N.Y.: Robert E. Krieger Publishing Company.
- Graeber, David (2001) Toward an Anthropological Theory of Value: The False Coin of Our Own Dreams. New York: Palgrave.
- Harkin, Michael E. (1990) "Mortuary Practices and the Category of the Person among the Heiltsuk." Arctic Anthropology, vol. 27, no. 1, pp. 87–108.
- Masco, Joseph (1995) "'It Is a Strict Law That Bids Us Dance': Cosmologies, Colonialism, Death and Ritual Authority in the Kwakwaka'wakw Potlatch, 1849-1922." Comparative Studies in Society and History, vol. 37, no. 1, pp. 41–75.
- Olson, Ronald L. (1950) "Black Market in Prerogatives among the Northern Kwakiutl." Kroeber Anthropological Society Papers, vol. 1, pp. 78–80.
- Spradley, James P. (1969) Guests Never Leave Hungry: The Autobiography of James Sewid, a Kwakiutl Indian. New Haven, Conn.: Yale University Press.
- Walens, Stanley (1981) Feasting with Cannibals: An Essay on Kwakiutl Cosmology. Princeton, N.J.: Princeton University Press.
- Wolf, Eric R. (1999) Envisioning Power: Ideologies of Dominance and Crisis. Berkeley: University of California Press.

== Nuu-chah-nulth ==
- Clutesi, George (1969) Potlatch. Sidney, B.C.: Gray's Publishing.
- Drucker, Philip (1951) The Northern and Central Nootkan Tribes. Washington: United States Government Printing Office.
- Jewitt, John R. (1815) A Narrative of the Adventures and Sufferings of John R. Jewitt, only survivor of the crew of the ship Boston, during a captivity of nearly three years among the savages of Nootka Sound: with an account of the manners, mode of living, and religious opinions of the natives. digital copy
- Sapir, Edward (1916) "The Social Organization of the West Coast Tribes." In: Proceedings and Transactions of the Royal Society of Canada for 1915, third series, vol. 9, no. 2, pp. 355–374.

== Coast Salish ==
- Suttles, Wayne (1960) "Affinal Ties, Subsistence, and Prestige among the Coast Salish." American Anthropologist, vol. 62, no. 2, pp. 296–305.

== Columbia River ==
- French, Kathrine S. (1955) Culture Segments and Variation in Contemporary Social Ceremonialism on the Warm Springs Reservation, Oregon. Ph.D. dissertation, Department of Political Science, Columbia University, New York.
