= Competitive altruism =

Theorized evolutionary mechanism

Competitive altruism is a possible mechanism for the persistence of cooperative behaviours, specifically those that are performed unconditionally. The theory of reciprocal altruism can be used to explain behaviours that are performed by a donor who receives some sort of benefit in the future. When no such compensation is received, however, reciprocity fails to explain altruistic behaviour. Both reciprocal altruism and competitive altruism anticipate that the more altruistic one is, the more they will receive. Competitive altruism explains unreciprocated altruistic behaviour as individuals striving to outcompete others in terms of their generosity so as to gain the unique benefits obtained from an enhanced status and reputation.

== Origins of competitive altruism in humans ==
Compared to other primates, humans show a much higher degree of altruism and cooperation towards unrelated individuals. This behaviour is unusual as it goes against one's best interests of benefiting oneself and their relatives in the interest of better survival. A study using sharing games to investigate the ontogenic origins of competitive altruism found evidence that a significant developmental change occurs in children from 5 to 8 years old. The 8 year old participants were more generous in the sharing game, especially when they were observed and their behaviour could affect their chances of being partnered with. The differences in behaviour between the 5 and 8 year olds suggest there is a component of their development at this stage that allows them to learn the mechanism of competitive altruism.

Evolutionary psychologists believe that altruistic behaviour provides adaptive advantages to humans. For example, through self-sacrificial competitive altruism, individuals perform conspicuous self-sacrificial prosocial acts to promote their desirable qualities. This allows them to be viewed favourably by others, which may reap benefits such as a desirable job or better choice of mate. A study found that sex played an important role in triggering this behaviour. Participants were placed into mixed-sex trios to complete a series of tasks, which involved self-sacrificial actions that were viewed as costly, difficult, and crucial towards the group's success. Participants who engaged in self-sacrificial behaviour were favourably viewed, and were rewarded later on by other participants with more money and being preferred as a task partner. The males scored higher than females for the self-rated personality trait of glory seeking, whilst females scored higher for social inhibition. Additionally, the more glory seeking males tended to engage in the self-sacrificial behaviour. Furthermore, the presence of other males seemed to trigger competitive altruistic behaviour, with males oftentimes pushing females out of the self-sacrificial roles, despite the willingness of several female participants. Moreover, males in the self sacrificial roles perceived their role as being of higher status than females in the same role did. This role's desirability can be attributed to it being a conspicuous display of self-sacrificing altruism that exemplifies their helpfulness and ability to withstand the cost. This behaviour can also be highly beneficial for males during mate selection. For example, many bird species' males have elaborate plumage. Although this reduces other aspects of the male's fitness, it is suggested that other than making themselves visually attractive, it signals their superior resistance to parasites. This is because a more elaborate plumage display indicates they can afford to divert those resources to their appearance instead of their health.

== Characteristics ==
To explain competitive altruism, Roberts uses the example of preening among birds. Because certain birds cannot reach parasites on all parts of their bodies, particularly their necks, they benefit from preening one another. For any given bird, there is an entire flock of potential preeners, who compete in hopes of establishing a beneficial relationship. Cheaters, or those birds that try to be preened without preening others, do not compete and thus are excluded from these relationships. Their fitness is lowered because they are ostracized by members of the flock.

McNamara et al. quantitatively analyzed this theory. Like Robert Axelrod, they created a computer program to simulate repeated interactions among individuals. The program involved players with two genetically determined traits, a "cooperative trait" and a "choosiness trait". They found the following results:

'Paradoxical' trait combinations yield particularly low payoffs: individuals with low choosiness but high effort tend to get exploited by their co-players; individuals with high choosiness but low effort waste their time searching for better co-players, which are, however, unlikely to accept them. The positive correlation between choosiness and cooperativeness leads to a positive assortment between cooperative types – an essential feature of all mechanisms that promote cooperation.

The development of such cooperation requires variation in the degree of cooperation and choosiness, which the researchers attributed to genetic mutation and variation. McNamara et al. also determined that since a period of searching is required for "mutually acceptable" players to find one another, competitive altruism is more likely to arise in animals with long life spans.

== The prisoner's dilemma ==
To relate this condition to the prisoner's dilemma, an individual may benefit the most in a one-time interaction with another by defecting (i.e. receiving benefits without incurring any cost to itself). However, in an iterated prisoner's dilemma, where individuals interact more than once if the act of defecting makes the individual less likely to attract a fit mate in the future, then cooperative behavior will be selected for.

This selection for cooperation is even stronger if an individual's action in interaction is observed by third-party individuals, for the possibility of forming a reputation arises. Amotz Zahavi, famous for his work with the altruistic Arabian babbler, suggests that this level of "social prestige" will affect which individuals interact with one another and how they behave.

Competitive altruism has been demonstrated repeatedly in studies with humans. For instance, individuals are more generous when their behaviour is visible to others and altruistic individuals receive more social status and are selectively preferred as collaboration partners and group leaders. Adding insights from sexual selection theory research has also found that men behave more altruistically in the presence of an (attractive) female, and altruistic males are selectively preferred as long-term sexual partners.

== The handicap principle ==
The theory of competitive altruism also helps one connect such behaviour to the handicap principle. With competitive altruism, cooperation is considered a trait that provides a signaling benefit, and thus is subject to sexual selection. Like a peacock's tail, cooperation persists and is magnified, even though it carries a cost to the individual. Cooperation must be significantly costly to the individual, such that only a limited proportion of the population is fit enough to partake.

Roberts builds on the idea of altruism as a signalling benefit with his "free gift theory". Because the recipient gains some benefit from the interaction with the donor, there is an incentive to pay attention to the signal. For example, some male birds will offer food to a potential mate. Such behavior, called courtship feeding, not only benefits the female, who receives a meal without expending any energy, but also conveys the ability of the male to forage. Consequently, the signal is kept true (i.e. it remains a correct reflection on the fitness of the mate).

However, the connection between competitive altruism and signaling is not without criticism. Wright raises the point that an altruistic signalling behaviour like gift-giving would cause a "flow of fitness from the higher quality individual to the lower quality one" and reduce the veracity of the signal. To account for this likely trend, Wright stipulates that the altruistic behavior must be directed at a mate or ally. For the theory to hold, the signaling benefit would have to be shown to improve the individual's fitness beyond the benefit gained from the "investment" in the partner.

== Encouraging cooperative behaviour ==
For certain cooperative behaviour, such as the provision of public goods, individuals have the incentive to not contribute, as the benefits are spread among many and only the altruist must incur the cost. Competitive altruism can explain why societies are willing to contribute to the provision of public goods and how societies avoid problems such as the tragedy of the commons.

=== Public Goods ===
Milinski et al.'s study found that people contribute more in public goods games when they expect to participate in an indirect reciprocity game afterwards, and people donate higher amounts to those who contributed more in the public goods game. A 2004 study replicating and expanding on Milinski et al.'s findings found that the consideration of reputation is also linked to trust. This study found that high contributors in the public goods game were not more likely to be high contributors in the indirect reciprocity game as previous research suggested. Furthermore, participants gave money even when their partner contributed very little in the public goods game. Previous research has shown people typically do not reward low contributors and usually punish them by lowering their payoff. This difference was explained as the money participants sent to low contributors in the second game not being a reward, rather a token of trust in hopes this encourages their partner to give them more money back.

=== Tragedy of the Commons ===
The mechanism of competitive altruism can be used to solve the tragedy of the commons by appealing to people's desire for a high status and positive reputation and its benefits to encourage prosocial behaviour. A 2010 study found that when a competition was based on giving, participants gave more compared to competitions based on earnings. Furthermore, if winning a generosity competition or topping a generosity ranking, such as Slate magazine's rankings of the most generous Americans based on charitable contributions, allows one to gain better rank or social status, this may fuel competitive altruistic behaviour. Competitive altruism can be used to solve the tragedy of the commons by encouraging sustainable behaviour. Research has shown mixed findings on motivations for engaging in sustainable behaviour, with some studies emphasising pure altruism and other studies emphasising competitive altruism as the key motivation. Pinto et al.'s found that motivations behind recycling is linked to pure altruism encouraging cooperation, whilst both pure and competitive altruism were linked to motivating buying eco-friendly products. They also found that identity goals such as reputation was a key moderator for sustainable behaviour. Behaviours associated with collectivist ideals, such as buying eco-friendly products, were more likely to have competitive altruism as a key motivation.

== See also ==
- Conspicuous conservation
- Coopetition
- Nice guy
- Noblesse oblige
- Potlatch
