= Potlatch among Athabaskan peoples =

The traditional potlatch among Athabaskan peoples was a gathering that combined aspects of competition, peacekeeping and a show of wealth.

== History ==
The traditional Athabaskan potlatch had "social, religious and economic significance." It was a gathering that combined aspects of competition, peacekeeping and a show of wealth. During a potlatch, members of the society with a surplus of food and supplies provide these for all members of a clan, and in situations with other clans this sharing of resources is either a competitive showing or one of creating loyalties, and sometimes both simultaneously.

Traditionally the village was centered on the chiefs' house, and this is where potlatches were held. This was because the chief had the biggest cache where the food was stored.

There were many different reasons to hold a potlatch in Athabaskan culture, including the birth of a child, a surplus of food, or a death in the clan. The most elaborate of Athabaskan potlatches was the mortuary or funeral potlatch. This marked "the separation of the deceased from society and is the last public expression of grief."

There were slight variations in the funeral and mortuary potlatches depending on the status or role of the member of the clan who had died. Different songs and dances were performed for a warrior than for an elder. Because of the tight-knit manner of a group or clan, usually due to extended family ties, the death of an elder, in particular, had a very large effect on the tribe. The corpse would first be dressed by the women of the clan and be prepared, while the mobilizing and putting together of the funeral would be taken care of by the closest male relative of the deceased. The preparations would differ but the proceedings of the funerals themselves were generally similar.

The potlatch generally consisted of "the feast, dancing & singing, oratory, and the distribution of gifts". The feast was provided by a wealthier member of the group to communicate "sentiment, affection, familiarity and goodwill." Dancing and singing were a reciprocation of the guests to the hosts for their generosity. Stories were told in the same manner, and for entertainment. The act of giving out gifts was possibly the most dynamic aspect of the traditional Athabaskan potlatch. This was a generous act of sharing one's wealth with the rest of the tribe, and simultaneously a show of the abundance and superiority of the host.

Modern potlatches still contain many of the traditional aspects of sharing food, giving gifts, singing, dancing and telling stories, but now the purpose has changed. Most modern potlatches can be held for similar reasons, such as a birth or a death, but now they are no longer so much a show of wealth, but a celebration to keep the tradition alive.

== Food ==
As with other aspects of the potlatch, food plays a significant role in the social structure; providing large amounts of food for the guests is symbolic of the host's love and care for his guests, and also for the nourishment he symbolically provides to future generations. Due to the overabundance of food, leftovers are distributed first to elders, then the remainder of the guests. According to Simeone, doing so is "a reminder of the host's generosity long after the event."

=== Preparation ===
As the potlatch is attended by dozens to hundreds of people from neighboring villages, and is often hosted by one or two people, food and money are given as a gift to the host by family members, to help offset the cost of feeding so many. Several men of the village are tasked with hunting moose specifically for a potlatch; it is not uncommon for three or more moose to be killed to feed the guests over the two or three days feasting. One account of a potlatch in the village of Tetlin claimed 22 moose were killed and butchered in preparation of a particularly large feast. In addition to moose meat, many other types of wild food are harvested or donated, such as beaver, duck, salmon, and berries. Traditional subsistence foods provide a reminder of the relationship between the Athabaskan and the land which has historically sustained them.

=== Meals ===
Breakfast and lunch are served each day for potlatch attendees and are less formal than the evening meal. Breakfast is offered each morning; eggs, bacon, coffee, and potatoes are common fare. Lunch consists of soup, sandwiches, and tea. The evening meal is scheduled for a specific time and all potlatch attendees are expected to attend. It is the most significant spiritual and social event of the potlatch and is treated as such by the attendees. Large rolls of white butcher paper are rolled out on the floor to serve as place settings and many participants sit next to each other on the floor. Benches and chairs are provided for elders.

=== Types ===
Moose is normally cooked by the men of the potlatch. It is served roasted, fried, and as moose head stew, which consists of the meaty portions of the moose's head mixed with vegetables and rice in large stew pots. Grilled and smoked salmon is served, as is soup made from round whitefish. Wild cranberries and blueberries are incorporated into desserts.

The traditional wild food is supplemented by store-bought items, most notably black loose leaf tea, which was introduced to the Athabaskan by traders in the 1800s and remains a staple among present day potlatches. Bannock, also known as fry bread, rolls, and salads are also served.

== Dance ==
The celebration of dance for the Athabaskan people plays a vital role in the success of a potlatch. Unlike many cultures that have changed their mourning over the course of many generations, the Athabaskan people have stayed strong and true to the old ways of song and dance.

Dancing is a very important part of Athabaskan culture, and it is often the focal point of the potlatch, particularly after the evening meal. During potlatches a variety of songs are sung; the first songs sung of the weeklong event are called the mourning songs. Traditionally new songs are sung first to give thanks to the hosts that are sponsoring the potlatch, followed by the singing of old songs.

Poldine Carlo, an Athabaskan from Interior Alaska, noted that "The potlatch usually lasted for a week. The first night we would have a big potlatch at the community hall and then the mourning songs were sung, the new songs first for the ones the potlatch was being given for and then the old, old songs that we have been singing for a long time. The women would stand in line all across the hall and dance."

An excerpt from the book Rifles, Blankets, & Beads tells of "sorry songs" that were sung at a potlatch that took place in Tanacross: "At one potlatch in Tanacross, for example, a sequence of sorry songs began with one made especially for the person that had just died. It followed by songs for a young man who died in a house fire 10 years before; a boy who drowned in the river while attempting to draw water and for Elisha's father, who died in the 1960s."

The grieving process is shared between the family, the people of their village, and often, members of neighboring villages. Just as in the past, its size depends on the age and social status of the deceased and the host's wealth. In major potlatches with wealthy hosts, attendance spans across the entire community, outer communities, and cities such as Fairbanks and Anchorage. If a family member of the deceased doesn't attend, arrives late, or has not communicated their loss to the rest of the community, tribal chiefs have been known to interrupt potlatches to publicly shame them. The burden of grief is meant to be shared. Its burden lessens through the kinship of community, and the gathering of communities supplements healing and joy.

For Ahtna Athabaskans, a potlatch begins with mourners expressing their grief by crying, singing sorry songs, and dancing, then, song and dance turns joyous. At the end, gifts are distributed to dissolve grief of the hosts. One dance practiced by some Athabaskans, like the Koyukon, is the calico dance, where colorful bolts of cloth tied with furs are passed, traditionally among female participants, who dance in a large circle, and people, traditionally men, dance inside. Sometimes, this is followed by an Athabaskan fiddle dance. Speeches often come prior to song and dance in Koyukon potlatches.

== Gifts ==
A traditional Athabaskan potlatch is concluded with the giving of gifts. Valuable trade items, traditionally dentalium shells, now largely replaced by rifles, blankets, cash, and beaded items, are collected by the host from members of their mother's moiety and are redistributed by the host to members of his father's moiety in exchange for their contributions of celebration and participation in the potlatch. For instance, an exceptional dancer might be rewarded for her abilities, and likewise a grave digger or pallbearer would be compensated at a funeral potlatch.

At the conclusion of a potlatch, gifts are piled high in the center of the meeting hall and distributed to guests. By distributing guns and blankets to the assembled guests, the host demonstrates his relationship to and his feelings for his paternal relatives and potential marriage partners. Through these distributions the host gains prestige as he symbolically ensures his guests' existence by giving them guns to hunt with and blankets to keep them warm.

Beaded items are also commonly given as gifts at potlatches, including necklaces, moccasins, gloves, vests, and gun cases. Beads, like the dentalium they have come to replace, are symbolic of social relations that, when expressed in the form of necklaces or sashes, literally surround or embrace the individual. Today Tanacross people see dentalium shells not only as symbols of prestige but also as expressions of affection.

While rifles, blankets and beaded items are traditional potlatch gifts, they are not the only ones. Other gifts might include furs, afghans, quilts, moose hide jackets, calico, snowshoes, gloves, hats, coffeepots, enameled plates, snow shovels, suitcases, frying pans and many others both practical and symbolic.

Dentalium shells and moose hide jackets are often worn by the host while distributing gifts. In some communities, gifts are given out while wearing gloves. If the gloves are kept, it is believed that the wealth will be stored in them, and eventually return to the giver.

Often a potlatch host will fully deplete their savings and give away their entire material wealth. The potlatch is an honorable ceremony, and in giving everything away, the host gains prestige. A rich man who does not share his possessions is, to an Athabaskan, a stingy man who is to be pitied.

== See also ==
- Gift economy
- Koha, a similar concept among the Māori
- Kula ring, a similar concept in the Trobriand Islands (Oceania)
- Moka, another similar concept in Papua New Guinea
- Potluck (folk etymology has derived the term "potluck" from the Native American custom of potlatch)
- Pow wow, a gathering whose name is derived from the Narragansett word for "spiritual leader"
