= Reciprocal altruism =

Form of behaviour between organisms

Diagram showing reciprocal altruism

In evolutionary biology, reciprocal altruism is a behaviour whereby an organism acts in a manner that temporarily reduces its fitness while increasing another organism's fitness, with the expectation that the other organism will act in a similar manner at a later time.

The concept was initially developed by Robert Trivers to explain the evolution of cooperation as instances of mutually altruistic acts. The concept is close to the strategy of "tit for tat" used in game theory. In 1987, Trivers presented at a symposium on reciprocity, noting that he initially titled his article "The Evolution of Delayed Return Altruism," but reviewer W. D. Hamilton suggested renaming it "The Evolution of Reciprocal Altruism." While Trivers adopted the new title, he retained the original examples, causing confusion about reciprocal altruism for decades. Rothstein and Pierotti (1988) addressed this issue at the symposium, proposing new definitions that clarified the concepts. They argued that "Delayed Return Altruism" was a superior term and introduced "pseudo-reciprocity" to replace it.

== Theory ==
The concept of "reciprocal altruism", as introduced by Trivers, suggests that altruism, defined as an act of helping another individual while incurring some cost for this act, could have evolved since it might be beneficial to incur this cost if there is a chance of being in a reverse situation where the individual who was helped before may perform an altruistic act towards the individual who helped them initially. This concept finds its roots in the work of W.D. Hamilton, who developed mathematical models for predicting the likelihood of an altruistic act to be performed on behalf of one's kin.

Putting this into the form of a strategy in a repeated prisoner's dilemma would mean to cooperate unconditionally in the first period and behave cooperatively (altruistically) as long as the other agent does as well. If chances of meeting another reciprocal altruist are high enough, or if the game is repeated for a long enough amount of time, this form of altruism can evolve within a population.

This is close to the notion of "tit for tat" introduced by Anatol Rapoport, although there still seems a slight distinction in that "tit for tat" cooperates in the first period and from thereon always replicates an opponent's previous action, whereas "reciprocal altruists" stop cooperation in the first instance of non-cooperation by an opponent and stay non-cooperative from thereon. This distinction leads to the fact that in contrast to reciprocal altruism, tit for tat may be able to restore cooperation under certain conditions despite cooperation having broken down.

Christopher Stephens shows a set of necessary and jointly sufficient conditions "... for an instance of reciprocal altruism:

1. the behaviour must reduce a donor's fitness relative to a selfish alternative;
2. the fitness of the recipient must be elevated relative to non-recipients;
3. the performance of the behaviour must not depend on the receipt of an immediate benefit;
4. conditions 1, 2, and 3 must apply to both individuals engaging in reciprocal helping.

There are two additional conditions necessary "...for reciprocal altruism to evolve:"

- A mechanism for detecting 'cheaters' must exist.
- A large (indefinite) number of opportunities to exchange aid must exist.

The first two conditions are necessary for altruism as such, while the third is distinguishing reciprocal altruism from simple mutualism and the fourth makes the interaction reciprocal. Condition number five is required as otherwise non-altruists may always exploit altruistic behaviour without any consequences and therefore evolution of reciprocal altruism would not be possible. However, it is pointed out that this "conditioning device" does not need to be conscious. Condition number six is required to avoid cooperation breakdown through forward induction—a possibility suggested by game theoretical models.

In 1987, Trivers told a symposium on reciprocity that he had originally submitted his article under the title "The Evolution of Delayed Return Altruism", but reviewer W. D. Hamilton suggested that he change the title to "The Evolution of Reciprocal Altruism". Trivers changed the title, but not the examples in the manuscript, which has led to confusion about what were appropriate examples of reciprocal altruism for the last 50 years. In their contribution to that symposium, Rothstein and Pierotti (1988) addressed this issue and proposed new definitions concerning the topic of altruism, that clarified the issue created by Trivers and Hamilton. They proposed that Delayed Return Altruism was a superior concept and used the term pseudo-reciprocity in place of DRA.

== Examples ==
The following examples could be understood as altruism. However, showing reciprocal altruism in an unambiguous way requires more evidence as will be shown later.

=== Cleaner fish ===
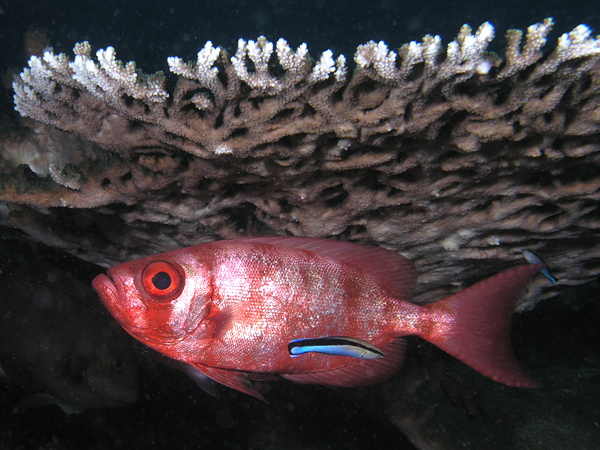
Cleaning symbiosis: a small cleaner wrasse (Labroides dimidiatus) with advertising coloration services a big eye squirrelfish (Priacanthus hamrur) in an apparent example of reciprocal altruism.

An example of reciprocal altruism is cleaning symbiosis, such as between cleaner fish and their hosts, though cleaners include shrimps and birds, and clients include fish, turtles, octopuses and mammals. Aside from the apparent symbiosis of the cleaner and the host during actual cleaning, which cannot be interpreted as altruism, the host displays additional behaviour that meets the criteria for delayed return altruism:

The host fish allows the cleaner fish free entrance and exit and does not eat the cleaner, even after the cleaning is done. The host signals the cleaner it is about to depart the cleaner's locality, even when the cleaner is not in its body. The host sometimes chases off possible dangers to the cleaner.

The following evidence supports the hypothesis:

The cleaning by cleaners is essential for the host. In the absence of cleaners the hosts leave the locality or suffer from injuries inflicted by ectoparasites. There is difficulty and danger in finding a cleaner. Hosts leave their element to get cleaned. Others wait no longer than 30 seconds before searching for cleaners elsewhere.

A key requirement for the establishment of reciprocal altruism is that the same two individuals must interact repeatedly, as otherwise the best strategy for the host would be to eat the cleaner as soon as cleaning was complete. This constraint imposes both a spatial and a temporal condition on the cleaner and on its host. Both individuals must remain in the same physical location, and both must have a long enough lifespan, to enable multiple interactions. There is reliable evidence that individual cleaners and hosts do indeed interact repeatedly.

This example meets some, but not all, of the criteria described in Trivers's model. In the cleaner-host system the benefit to the cleaner is always immediate. However, the evolution of reciprocal altruism is contingent on opportunities for future rewards through repeated interactions. In one study, nearby host fish observed "cheater" cleaners and subsequently avoided them. In these examples, true reciprocity is difficult to demonstrate since failure means the death of the cleaner. However, if Randall's claim that hosts sometimes chase off possible dangers to the cleaner is correct, an experiment might be constructed in which reciprocity could be demonstrated. In actuality this is one of Trivers' examples of Delayed Return Altruism as discussed by Rothstein and Pierotti 1988.

=== Warning calls in birds ===
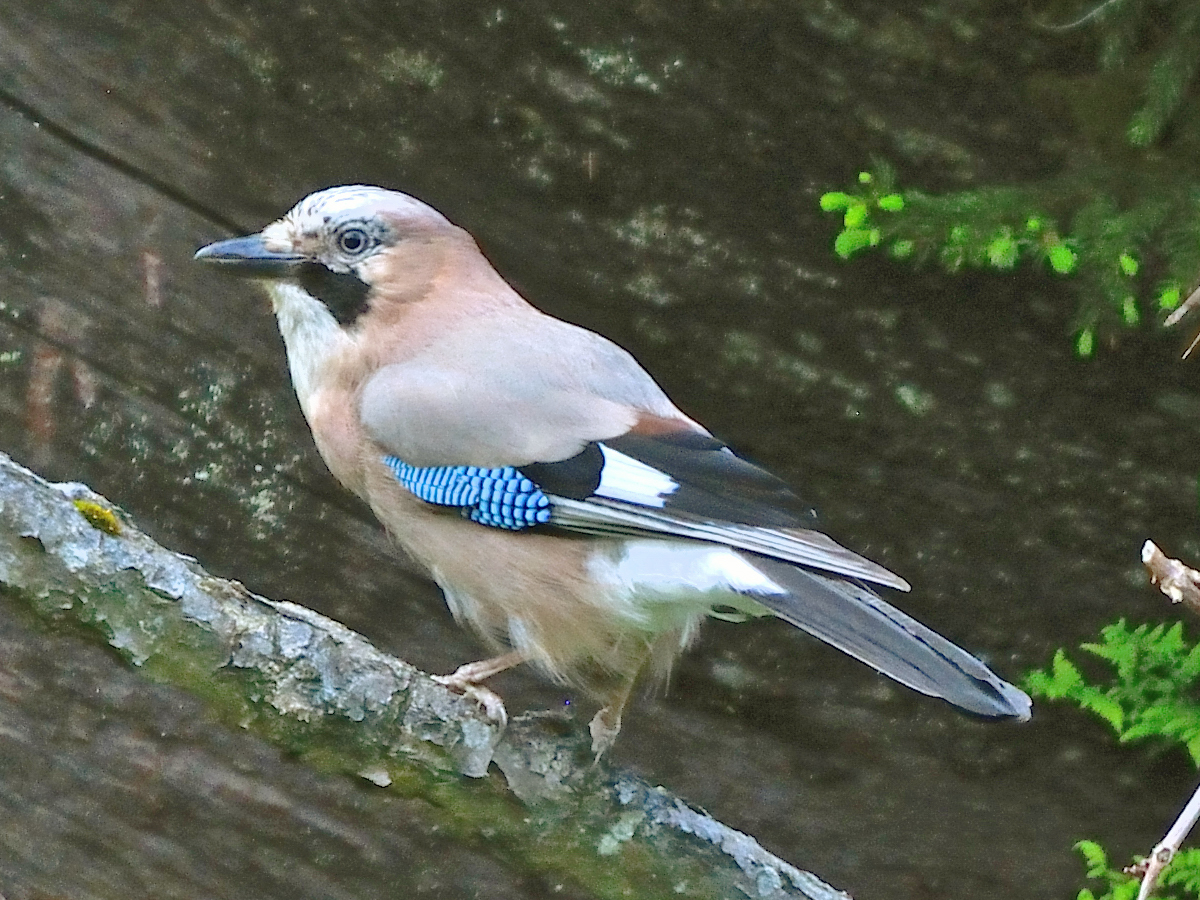
Eurasian jay, Garrulus glandarius, gives loud alarm calls from its tree perch when it sees a predator.

Warning calls, although exposing a bird and putting it in danger, are frequently given by birds. An explanation in terms of altruistic behaviors given by Trivers:

It has been shown that predators learn specific localities and specialize individually on prey types and hunting techniques. It is therefore disadvantageous for a bird to have a predator eat a conspecific, because the experienced predator may then be more likely to eat them. Alarming another bird by giving a warning call tends to prevent predators from specializing on the caller's species and locality. In this way, birds in areas in which warning calls are given will be at a selective advantage relative to birds in areas free from warning calls.

Nevertheless, this presentation lacks important elements of reciprocity. It is very hard to detect and ostracize cheaters. There is no evidence that a bird refrains from giving calls when another bird is not reciprocating, nor evidence that individuals interact repeatedly. Given the aforementioned characteristics of bird calling, a continuous bird emigration and immigration environment (true of many avian species) is most likely to be partial to cheaters, since selection against the selfish gene is unlikely.

Another explanation for warning calls is that these are not warning calls at all: A bird, once it has detected a bird of prey, calls to signal to the bird of prey that it was detected, and that there is no use trying to attack the calling bird. Two facts support this hypothesis:

- The call frequencies match the hearing range of the predator bird.
- Calling birds are less attacked—predator birds attack calling birds less frequently than other birds.

=== Nest protecting ===
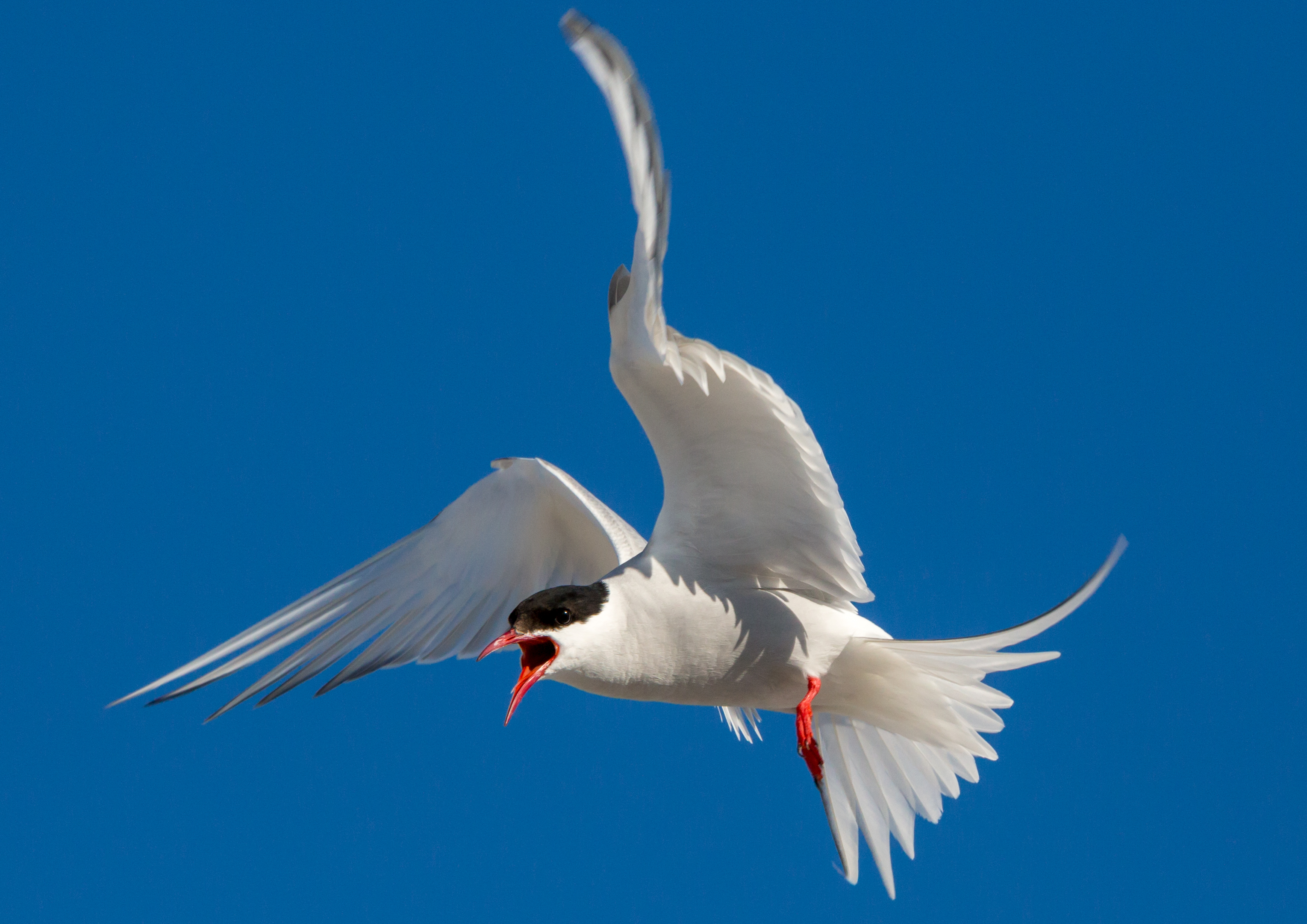
Arctic terns protect their offspring extremely aggressively by very quick drop-downs from a stationary flight over their enemies. Other birds often benefit from this behavior by breeding very close to the Arctic terns.

Red-winged blackbird males help defend neighbor's nests. There are many theories as to why males behave this way. One is that males only defend other nests which contain their extra-pair offspring. Extra-pair offspring are juveniles which may contain some of the male bird's DNA. Another is the tit-for-tat strategy of reciprocal altruism. A third theory is, males help only other closely related males. A study done by The Department of Fisheries and Wildlife provided evidence that males used a tit-for-tat strategy. The Department of Fisheries and Wildlife tested many different nests by placing stuffed crows by nests, and then observing behavior of neighboring males. The behaviors they looked for included the number of calls, dives, and strikes. After analyzing the results, there was not significance evidence for kin selection; the presence of extra-pair offspring did not affect the probability of help in nest defense. However, males reduced the amount of defense given to neighbors when neighbor males reduced defense for their nests. This demonstrates a tit-for-tat strategy, where animals help those who previously helped them. This strategy is one type of reciprocal altruism.

=== Vampire bats ===
Vampire bats also display reciprocal altruism, as described by Wilkinson. The bats feed each other by regurgitating blood. Since bats only feed on blood and will die after just 70 hours of not eating, this food sharing is a great benefit to the receiver and a great cost to the giver. To qualify for reciprocal altruism, the benefit to the receiver would have to be larger than the cost to the donor. This seems to hold as these bats usually die if they do not find a blood meal two nights in a row. Also, the requirement that individuals who have behaved altruistically in the past are helped by others in the future is confirmed by the data. However, the consistency of the reciprocal behaviour, namely that a previously non-altruistic bat is refused help when it requires it, has not been demonstrated. Therefore, the bats do not seem to qualify yet as an unequivocal example of reciprocal altruism.

=== Primates ===
Grooming in primates meets the conditions for reciprocal altruism according to some studies. One of the studies in vervet monkeys shows that among unrelated individuals, grooming induce higher chance of attending to each other's calls for aid. However, vervet monkeys also display grooming behaviors within group members, displaying alliances. This would demonstrate vervet monkey's grooming behavior as a part of kin selection since the activity is done between siblings in this study. Moreover, following the criteria by Stephen, if the study is to be an example of reciprocal altruism, it must prove the mechanism for detecting cheaters.

=== Bacteria ===
Numerous species of bacteria engage in reciprocal altruistic behaviors with other species. Typically, this takes the form of bacteria providing essential nutrients for another species, while the other species provides an environment for the bacteria to live in. Reciprocal altruism is exhibited between nitrogen-fixing bacteria and plants in which they reside. Additionally, it can be observed between bacteria and some species of flies such as Bactrocera tryoni. These flies consume nutrient-producing bacteria found on the leaves of plants; in exchange, they reside within the flies' digestive system. This reciprocal altruistic behavior has been exploited by techniques designed to eliminate B. tryoni, which are fruit fly pests native to Australia.

=== Humans ===
Examples of reciprocal altruism in humans include helping injured individuals, sharing food, tools, or knowledge, and providing assistance in crises with the expectation of future aid. In social interactions, individuals often engage in direct reciprocity, such as returning favors or lending resources with an implicit understanding of future repayment. Indirect reciprocity is also observed, where individuals help others based on reputation, encouraging mutual cooperation within a community. Economic and political systems rely on reciprocal altruism through trade agreements, diplomatic alliances, and social contracts, where long-term benefits outweigh short-term costs. Additionally, studies in game theory, such as the Prisoner's Dilemma, illustrate how cooperative behaviors emerge and stabilize when individuals recognize the advantages of mutual support.

== Exceptions ==
Some animals seem to be unable to develop reciprocal altruism. For example, pigeons defect instead of a random response or a tit-for-tat in a prisoner's dilemma game against a computer. This may be due to favoring short-term thinking over long-term thinking.

== Regulation by emotional disposition ==
In comparison to that of other animals, the human altruistic system is a sensitive and unstable one. Therefore, the tendency to give, to cheat, and the response to other's acts of giving and cheating must be regulated by a complex psychology in each individual, social structures, and cultural traditions. Individuals differ in the degree of these tendencies and responses. According to Trivers, the following emotional dispositions and their evolution can be understood in terms of regulation of altruism.

- Friendship and emotions of liking and disliking.
- Moralistic aggression. A protection mechanism from cheaters acts to regulate the advantage of cheaters in selection against altruists. The moralistic altruist may want to educate or even punish a cheater.
- Gratitude and sympathy. A fine regulation of altruism can be associated with gratitude and sympathy in terms of cost/benefit and the level in which the beneficiary will reciprocate.
- Guilt and reparative altruism. Prevents the cheater from cheating again. The cheater shows regret to avoid paying too dearly for past acts.
- Subtle cheating. A stable evolutionary equilibrium could include a low percentage of mimics in controversial support of adaptive sociopathy.
- Trust and suspicion. These are regulators for cheating and subtle cheating.
- Partnerships. Altruism to create friendships.

It is not known how individuals pick partners as there has been little research on choice. Modeling indicates that altruism about partner choices is unlikely to evolve, as costs and benefits between multiple individuals are variable. Therefore, the time or frequency of reciprocal actions contributes more to an individual's choice of partner than the reciprocal act itself.

== See also ==
- Altruism (biology)
- Collaboration
- The common good
- Competitive altruism
- Enlightened self-interest
- Evolutionary models of food sharing
- Gift economy
- Helping behavior
- Koinophilia
- Mutual Aid: A Factor of Evolution (1902)
- Norm of reciprocity
- Prosocial behavior
- Psychological egoism
- Reciprocity (social psychology)
- Reciprocity (evolution)
- Signalling theory
