= Dene music =

Music genre

Dene music is music composed by Northern Athabaskan-speaking First Nations peoples - the Chipewyan (Denesuline), Tlicho (Dogrib), Yellowknives (T'atsaot'ine), Slavey (Deh Gah Got'ine or Deh Cho), and Sahtu. The term generally refers to traditional musical compositions and dances.

Dene writer Leela Gilday states that there are four main genres: Dene love songs (Ets’ula); tea dance songs (Iliwa), handgames songs and drum dance songs.

While visiting Fort Liard in the 1800s, George Keith observed three kinds of Dene songs: "love songs, lamentation songs, and ceremonial songs".

Dene folk music uses melodies similar to European scales with the coloration of blue notes. According to scholar Michael Asch, Dene music includes "a melodic scale, melody, and metric rhythm". Asch states that traditional Dene music uses only one instrument—a frame drum called egheli—and that drum dances, also known as tea dances, are traditional to all Dene living in the Mackenzie River valley.

Syncopation is common, as are pulsating vocal styles. Melodies generally follow a descending pattern. Many songs, especially Drum Dances, ended with a vocal glissando and percussion break, along with a spoken thank you (mahsi). Vocables are very common.

Songs are typically composed anonymously, though there are no taboos on anyone writing most songs. In the contemporary era, Johnny Landry has become one of the best-known songwriters in this tradition, having penned "Hina Na Ho Hine", the "de facto Dene anthem", in 1980. A version of the song, recorded with Dene drummers, appears on Susan Aglukark's 1995 album This Child.

== See also ==
- Athabaskan fiddle

== Sources ==
- Abel, Kerry Margaret (1993). Drum Songs: Glimpses of Dene History. McGill–Queen's University Press. ISBN 978-0-7735-6389-6. OCLC 243500610.
- Asch, Michael (1988). Kinship and the Drum Dance in a Northern Dene Community. University of Alberta Press; Boreal Institute for Northern Studies. ISBN 0-919058-73-6. ISSN 0838-133X. OCLC 18749031.
