= Athabaskan fiddle =

Fiddle playing style

- Stylistic origins: Waltzes, Jigs, Two steps, Square Dances
- Cultural origins: Alaskan Athabaskans
- Typical instruments: Old time fiddle, guitar

Regional scenes
- Upriver, Downriver

Other topics
- Scottish folk music, Irish folk music, French-Canadian music

Athabaskan fiddle (or fiddle music, fiddling) is the old-time fiddle style that the Alaskan Athabaskans of the Interior Alaska have developed to play the fiddle (violin), solo and in folk ensembles. Fiddles were introduced in this area by Scottish, Irish, French Canadian, and Métis fur traders of the Hudson's Bay Company in the mid-19th century. Athabaskan fiddling is a variant of fiddling of the American southlands. Athabaskan fiddle music is most popular genre in Alaska and northwest Canada and featuring Gwich'in Bill Stevens (1933–2025), he is an Athabaskan fiddling legend and recipient the Alaska Governor's 2002 Award for the Native Arts) and Trimble Gilbert (born 1935, also Traditional Chief of Arctic Village).

The authoritative study of Alaskan Athabaskan fiddle music is The Crooked Stovepipe: Athapaskan Fiddle Music and Square Dancing in Northeast Alaska and Northwest Canada (1993), by Athabaskanist and ethnomusicologist Craig Mishler (now an independent scholar and formerly affiliate research professor at the Alaska Native Language Center, University of Alaska Fairbanks.

== Origins ==
In a sense, there are two main beginnings of Alaskan old-time music: the original introduction of fiddle music in 1847, and Alaska's version of the great folk music revival in the 1970s.

In addition to the fiddle music repertoire, which is distinctively Athabaskan fiddlers incorporate country music into their performances, leaving blurred lines of distinction between Athabaskan fiddle music and country music. Athabaskan fiddle music has been cultivated in relative isolation from mainstream American country music.

According to several accounts, the first fiddler on the Yukon River was a Hudson's Bay Company employee named Antoine Hoole, who was among a trading party who established Fort Yukon, Alaska in 1847. His French Canadian influence likely helped spread the Anglo-Celtic music and dance tradition to the local Indians (First Nations and Métis), a rich tradition that continues today as a unique style of old-time music known as Athabaskan fiddle music. Throughout the 19th and early 20th centuries, fiddle music blended with aboriginal singing and dancing and melodic choral singing of hymns introduced by Anglican and Catholic missionaries. This music developed largely in isolation, with only occasional injections of new influences, and today is its own unique style. Athabaskan old-time fiddling music represents a fusion of traditional Athabascan instrumental and vocal music with the songs and violin tunes brought to the region in the late 1840s by Hudson Bay Company traders from their homelands in Scotland, Ireland, the Orkney Islands and French Canada. The popular Gwich'in tune, The Red River Jig, almost certainly came from the Red River area of southern Manitoba.

The gold rush such as the Klondike (1896–1899) of Canada and Nome (1899–1909) and Fairbanks (1902–1905) of Alaska in the latter days of the 19th century and early 20th century saw another wave of musical influences as the prospectors' waltzes, jigs, schottisches, foxtrots, two steps, and square dances (running sets) were incorporated into this unique musical style.

== Types ==
Two types of Athabaskan fiddle music have developed over time. Traditional Athabaskan fiddle music developed from two geographic centers within the vast Yukon River drainage. Upriver music developed among the Gwich'in and Hän Athabaskans of the Alaska-Yukon border area. Downriver music evolved some 50 years later at the turn of the century with the Klondike Gold Rush among the downriver Yukon peoples including Koyukon, Lower Tanana, and Deg Hit'an Athabaskans. Gwich'in and Koyukon have a distinct style of fiddle playing. With the arrival of this new group of Klondike outsiders came the guitar and new dances such as square dances, waltzes, one-steps, two-steps and polkas. The new musical style as downriver music included country and western tunes. While upriver music performances typically included just a fiddle and a guitar, downriver music was performed by a much larger ensemble.

== Socialization ==
Socialization is how Athabascan fiddle and dance have historically been transmitted, at celebrations, in fish camps, or when visiting each other's homes. In Athabaskan communities fiddle music is an integral part of social events such as potlatches, dances and holiday celebrations. Athabaskan fiddle music and the accompanying dances have been a part of Athabaskan life for over 150 years. Although having been introduced by outsiders, this music was adopted and adapted to serve the Athabaskan community.

=== Athabaskan Fiddle Festival ===
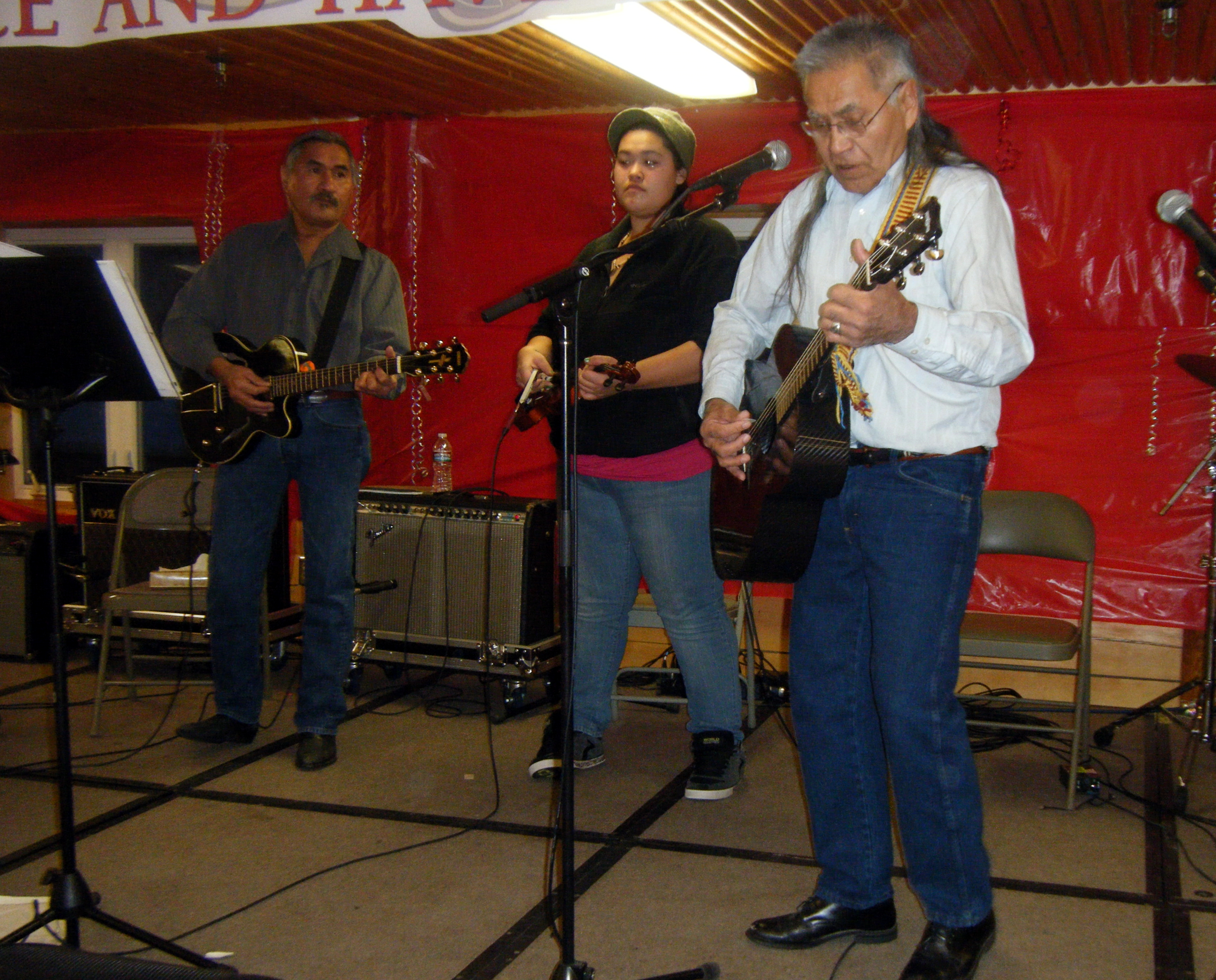
Trio playing at the 2011 festival. The lineup shown of electric guitar, fiddle and acoustic guitar is typical of the lineups seen at the festival.

Since 1983 Athabascan Fiddle Festival or Athabascan Fiddling Festival held annually in November in Fairbanks. The festival was instituted in 1983 by the Alaska State Council on the Arts (ASCA) and the Institute of Alaska Native Art and continues as a vital. This festival is described a testament to the far-reaching appeal of traditional music and he festival features Athabaskan and Eskimo (Yup'ik and Iñupiaq) fiddlers. When Bill Stevens returned to Alaska in 1982, he became instrumental in the development of this festival. He continues to participate in this now annual four-day celebration which has become a major cultural event for the people of the Interior.

The November festival carries on the tradition of fiddle music by bringing together bands from all over the state, including a few Eskimo bands, many of whom save up all year just to participate in this jubilant event. The festival prides itself on being a sober event, where people can gather for family fun, in a safe environment. Starting around 2005, the festival split into two venues, one featuring the faster upriver dances and the other the slower country-style downriver dances.

The best place to initiate a comparative contemporary beadwork (naagąįį in Gwich'in, nedenaałt'onee in Koyukon) study, as well as to hear Athabaskan fiddling, is probably during the annual Athabaskan Old-Time Fiddling Festival.

=== Young Native Fiddlers ===
Young Native Fiddlers (YNF) is a program of fiddle and guitar instruction for Alaska Native children in Fairbanks. Ethnicities of the approximately forty children participating each year include Athabaskan, Yup'ik, Iñupiaq and other American Indian. Funded by grants, community support, and fundraisers, Young Native Fiddlers offers individual, weekly violin or guitar lessons to children aged 5–18. Young Native Fiddlers was originally started as a teacher action research project, until a critical event signaled that greater involvement of members of this YNF community was needed. Young Native Fiddlers has received invitations to perform at fiddle dances with the Indigenous Northern Music Association and the Athabascan Fiddlers' Association as well as for the Alaska Federation of Natives (AFN) and the Festival of Native Arts.

== See also ==
- Dene music
