= Wage compression =

Reduction in wage inequality

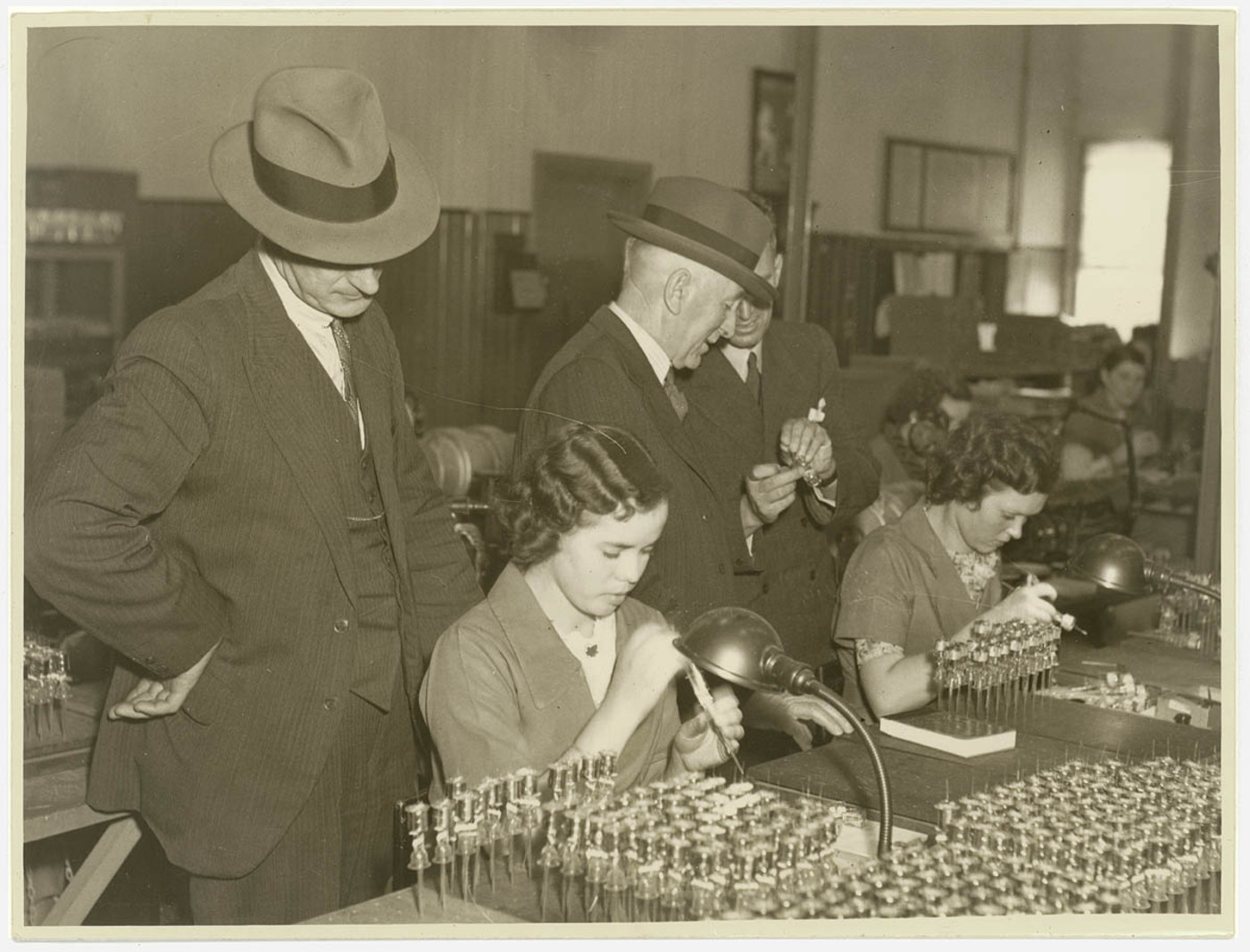
Executives from a company with factory workers.

Wage compression (also known as salary compression and pay compression) refers to the empirical regularity that wages for low-skilled workers and wages for high-skilled workers tend toward one another. As a result, the prevailing wage for a low-skilled worker exceeds the market-clearing wage, resulting in unemployment for low-skilled workers. Meanwhile, the prevailing wage for high-skilled workers is below the market-clearing wage, creating a short supply of high-skilled workers (and thus no unemployment of high-skilled workers).

Perfectly competitive labour markets can still exhibit a wage compression effect. In a perfectly competitive market, workers of different skill levels receive different wages and workers of the same skill level will receive the same wage no matter which firm they work in. However, the distribution of the skills of employees may be wider than the distribution of their wages.

Akerlof and Yellen (1990) propose a model that uses the fair-wage hypothesis to explain wage compression. The fair-wage hypothesis suggests that the effort put forth by a worker is proportional to the fairness of her wage, as compared to other workers within the firm. Accordingly, if executives of a given firm are compensated much more highly than the firm's unskilled workers, the unskilled workers will exert a lower level of effort. In equilibrium, high-skilled wages tend downward, while low-skilled wages tend upward, which defines wage compression.

Moene and Wallerstein (2006) argue that intentional wage compression led to a shift in favour of higher-productivity industries in Scandinavia, as it made low productivity industries less profitable and high productivity industries more profitable.

Companies that experience salary compression are more likely to experience salary compression with less experienced new or existing employees than with more experienced tenured employees.

== Causes ==
Historically, wage compression tends to occur when employees in identical jobs (e.g. financial analysts) are paid wages based on a broad range, instead of having a designated pay range for each level of a position (e.g. financial analyst – Level 1 [Year 1], financial analyst – Level 2 [Year 2], etc.). Furthermore, wage compression is particularly prevalent when the wages of an organisation's current employees do not proportionally mimic the increases in an industries average wage rate. Hence, these scenarios may result in:

- Remuneration packages of new employees being equal to those of an experienced employee, in an identical job position level (i.e., when the wages of less experienced employees are equal to the wages of experienced employees).
- Remuneration packages of junior staff are approximately equal to those of senior staff, in an identical job position (i.e., when the wages of low-level employees are approximately equal to the wages of high-level employees).

Wage compression is a result of numerous underlying issues, all of which tend to transpire over a period of years. These issues may have varying effects on firms, employees and the overall economy, especially in times of high economic uncertainty.

=== Minimum wage increases ===
Increases in minimum wage tends to result in junior (low-skilled) workers being overpaid relative to their senior (high-skilled) peers (i.e., If the minimum wage in a region increases from $20 to $25, new employees receive $25 per hour, while current employees with three years' experience are paid $26.50 per hour). Furthermore, senior employees may be underpaid relative to their junior peers. Thus, increases in minimum wage may result in the wage gap narrowing.

Increases to the minimum wage in an industry or region does not guarantee employees of high and low skill will experience wage compression. Firms within industries are free to set the starting wages of low skilled workers above the market clearing (minimum wage) rate, therefore any subsequent changes to the minimum wage in the region or industry will not affect these employees or result in wage compression with the firm. Albeit, high-skilled workers at these firms would likely require that their wages are also set above the market clearing rate to proportionally represent the higher starting remuneration of low-skilled workers, making such an approach impractical for most firms as higher wages would make them less competitive in the market.

=== Status ===
Frank (1984) proposed that a cause of wage compression is a trade off between status and wages. He argues that both status and wages are tradeable material goods which workers value. Higher skilled workers receive greater status in exchange for receiving a wage lower than the market clearing wage. Lower skilled workers receive a wage higher than the market clearing wage in exchange for less status.

Similarly, Cabrales et al. (2008) proposed that lower level employees experience disutility from working with higher level employees and would prefer to work in a more equal firm. Because of this, lower level employees must be compensated in order to convince them to work with higher level colleagues. Lower level workers receive extra wages which are uncorrelated with their productivity, leading to wage compression.

=== Training ===
Booth and Zoega (2004) found that although firms are willing to pay for the general training of employees in the absence of wage compression in an organisation, the presence of wage compression does increase the level of training chosen by firms. The research suggesting that firms are ushered towards free training by trade unions and labour institutions through the presence of wage compression. It can be argued that this is due to these unions and institutions seeking to reduce wage compression in firms, through up skilling currently low-skill workers. Further. Almeida-Santos and Mumford (2005) similarly found that firms with higher levels of wage compression are most likely to cover the costs of employee training. However, this study focused on wage compression within certain occupations rather than within individual firms. Pfeifer (2016) focused on individual firms and found that organisations with greater intra-firm wage compression are more likely to cover training costs than firms with less wage compression. It can be argued that one cause of increased wage compression is the fact that higher skilled workers do not have to pay for certain training costs using their own funds.

=== Uncertainty of employee ability ===
Gross, Guo and Charness (2015) found that managers or wage setting functions within a firm compress wages to a greater extent based on their uncertainty of employee abilities. Thus, firms that are unable to distinguish a high skilled employee from a low skill employee tend to set a wage that is above that of the market clearing wage for low skilled workers and below the market clearing wage for high skill workers. Due to the fact that firms do not want to undervalue potentially high skilled workers but also not overvalue low skilled workers resulting in compressed wages between the groups.

=== Advancement of technology ===
Autor and Salomons (2018) describe how advancements in technology in businesses increase levels of wage compression in the workplace. Their work suggests that as advancements in technology are made, low skilled workers are often replaced for lower-cost and more efficient machines, such as robots. Wage compression can present itself in numerous ways and effect contrasting groups differently, decreasing the demand for these low-skilled workers creates much greater wage pressure and potentially subsequent wage compression.

=== Globalisation ===
Through similar mechanisms as the aforementioned advancements in technology, globalisation and increased competition enabled by trade can add significant pressure to wages in economies with more expensive, or less efficient labour markets, via decreased demand for domestic labour. Countries such as China and India, with very strong export capabilities in manufacturing and other markets, will simply out-compete other countries, via absolute and comparative advantages, that are required to pay higher wages to employees and follow costly regulations.

== Effects ==
=== Firms ===
The presence of wage compression at a firm can have many implications for employee sentiment in regard to productivity, turnover, loyalty, skill set, and performance.

Effect on productivity
Experimental support was found in Gross, Guo and Charness's (2015) report which outlined reduced effort and productivity in higher skilled workers when they were paid less than lower skilled counterparts. Although, the research indicates this phenomenon is single sided. Therefore, it could be said if firms increase the pay of lower skilled employees disproportionately to high skilled (more experienced) employees, productivity and effort in these employees will be reduced.
Effect on turnover
If firms are incentivising new junior (low-skilled) employees with higher remuneration packages, then current employees (particularly high-skilled workers) may feel undervalued and thus, will be incentivised to look for new employment opportunities. Research from Leonardi, Pellizzari and Tabasso (2019) identified this effect in the Italian market where firms were forced to increase the minimum wage of employees each quarter causing wage compression from the low end. Subsequently turnover increased amongst high skill workers looking for greater remuneration.
Effect on skillset
If low-skilled (junior) employees are paid relatively equal to their high-skilled (senior) peers, then there is less incentive for more experienced employees to strive for promotion. Employees would prefer to decrease their workload and take on less responsibility, while earning a similar wage to their senior peers.
Effect on firm's performance
If workers feel undervalued and unmotivated to strive for greater results, this will have a negative effect on the firm's performance, in terms of profitability and other aspects. Greater variance in remuneration could serve to demotivate staff leading to poor performance outcomes for the firm. The study completed by Leonardi, Pellizzari and Tabasso (2019) supports this sentiment, stipulating that wage compression will generally have a negative effect on employee productivity, with this effect being stronger amongst workers in higher-skilled occupations. This could be attributed to the tendency for wage compression to reduce incentives for higher-skilled workers not to shirk or leave the firm for higher-paying jobs elsewhere. The study further found that lower-skilled firms were eventually driven out of the market.

=== Unions ===
Some unions may view wage compression as desirable because it can decrease large wage disparities within certain professions, and arguably promotes equality. Wage compression is viewed by some as a reform strategy which should be encouraged because it brings the pay of high level employees like senior executives closer to the pay of lower level employees. Further wage compression provides a positive effect for centrally negotiated wage changes and wage drift by unions, due to wage compression providing firms decreased costs during negotiations, allowing greater increases in wages for employees.

=== Low-skilled employees ===
Wage compression can negatively impact low-skilled employees through a decrease in their job security. Implications of decreased job security for low-skill workers is due to employers paying these workers a wage higher than what correlates to their level of productivity. Because of this, firms that need to reduce wage costs or decrease the number of employees will prefer to fire low-skilled workers. Consequently, wage compression can decrease the job security of lower-skilled employees.

=== High-skilled employees ===
Firms which experience wage compression usually value higher-skilled workers more than their lower-skilled counterparts because they have a higher level of productivity relative to their wages. Because of this, firms are less likely to make these employees redundant when costs need to be lowered and firms will prefer to keep high-skilled workers. Although, high-skilled workers are likely to have greater turnover rates as they seek market clearing rates as well as reduced motivation for results as their experience is not recognised with a pay premium over less experienced colleagues.

=== Increased income inequality ===
As wage compression increases, the gap between low and high income earners minimises, this also means that the pay gap between employees of different skill, education and experience level minimises, which can very quickly result what is known as income inequality. Income inequality is a major factor in wage compression and could be seen as the cause of other effects listed on this page. For example, income inequality may result in greater employee turnover, effect the firm's performance via higher levels of employee dissatisfaction and create conflict between workers of all manner.

=== Gender pay gap ===
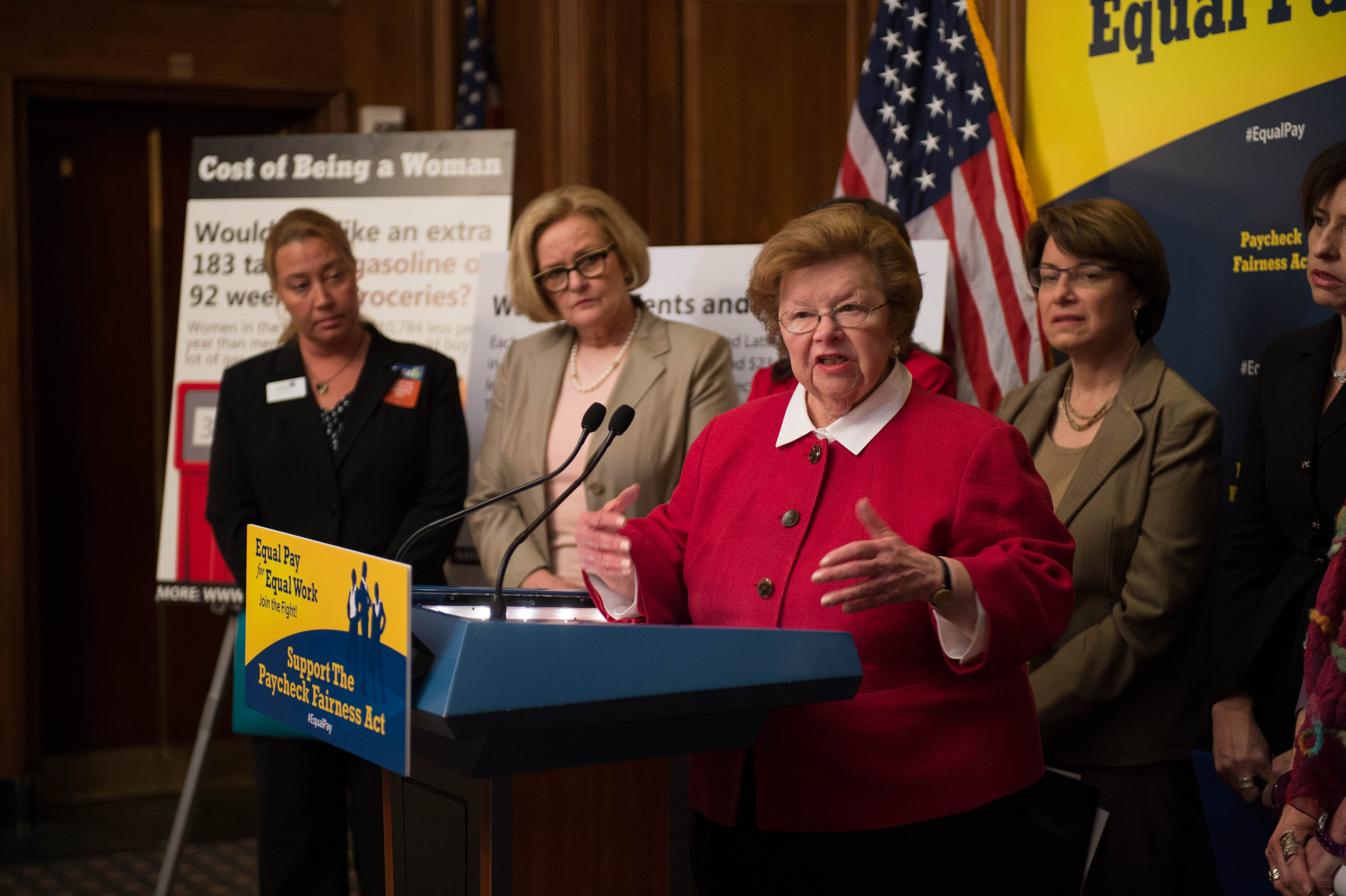
US lawmakers advocate for gender fairness in paychecks.

There are connections between wage compression and the gender wage gap. Santos-Pinto (2012) suggests that employers use wage offers to gesticulate a candidate's productivity or suitability in a given role. An employer's inability to individually assess and assign appropriate remuneration to an employee can lead to greater wage compression due to poor markers for success in the workplace. Santos-Pinto stipulates that women may be more likely to accept lower wages in a wage compressed environment and that decreasing wage compression may lead to more positive wage outcomes for women in the workplace. As women are generally disproportionately underrepresented in higher paying roles they could also potentially be seen as inordinate 'victims' of 'blanket' wage compression. Although the gender pay gap as a topic is still widely debated, regardless, it is valuable to consider the different consequences of wage compression for all genders and groups in the workplace.
