= Conspicuous conservation =

Conspicuous conservation describes consumers who purchase environmentally friendly products in order to signal a higher social status.

== Origins ==
The term is derived from the term "conspicuous consumption," coined by economist and sociologist Thorstein Veblen in his 1899 book The Theory of the Leisure Class: An Economic Study in the Evolution of Institutions. Veblen described certain sections of the nouveau riche who used their purchasing power to display prestige.

The term "conspicuous conservation" was coined by University of Syracuse economics professor Seymour Sacks, in a private conversation.

== Experiments ==
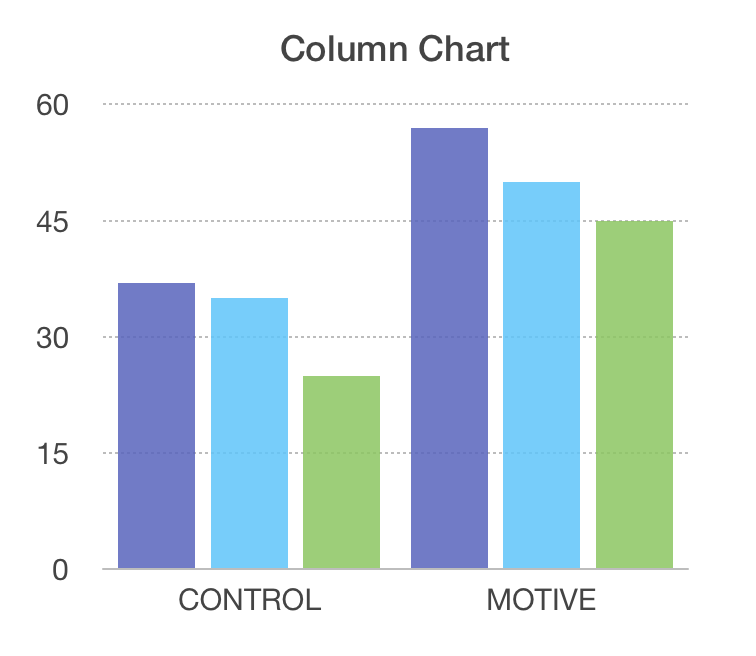
Figure 1: Percentage of participants in each group choosing the pro-environmental products. Respective to the car (purple), soap (blue), and dishwasher (green), the control group chose the pro-environmental products 37.2%, 25.7%, and 34.5% of the time. Participants of the motive-status group were much more likely to choose the green products and choose them 54.5%, 41.8%, and 49.1% of the time, respectively.

Between 2007 and 2009, psychology professors Vladas Griskevicius (University of Minnesota), Joshua M. Tybur (University of New Mexico), and Bram Van den Bergh (Rotterdam School of Management) conducted a series of experiments investigating conspicuous conservation. In the resulting paper, Going Green to Be Seen: Status, Reputation, and Conspicuous Conservation they argued that "buying such products can be construed as altruistic, since green products often cost more and are of lower quality than their conventional counterparts, but green goods benefit the environment for everyone".

Because altruistic behavior might function as a costly signal of social status, conspicuous conservation can be interpreted as a signal of high status. Their experiments showed that activating status motives led people to choose green products over more luxurious non-green products. The status motive increases the willingness to buy green products in public (but not in private) settings and in settings where green products cost more than non-green products. According to the authors, status competition can thus be used to promote pro-environmental behavior.

== See also ==
- Altruism
- Conspicuous consumption
- Social status
- Virtue signalling
- Conspicuous leisure
- Class consciousness
- Anti-consumerism
- Sign value
- Signalling theory
