= Sergei Kan =

American anthropologist (born 1953)

Sergei A. Kan (born March 31, 1953, in Moscow) is a Soviet-born American anthropologist known for his research with and writings on the Tlingit people of southeast Alaska, focusing on the potlatch and on the role of the Russian Orthodox Church in Tlingit communities.

Kan is of Russian Jewish origin and came to the United States in 1974. He did undergraduate studies at Boston University and received his master's and Ph.D. degrees from the University of Chicago, where he was a student of the anthropologist Raymond D. Fogelson. Kan also cites the influence of Nancy Munn, George W. Stocking, Jr., and John and Jean Comaroff.

He began fieldwork with the Tlingit in Sitka, Alaska, in 1979 and in 1980 was adopted by Charlotte Young (Laakhdu.oo) (1916–1982) into the Kaagwaantaan clan with her brother Ed Littlefield's name: Shaakhudastoo. In 1991, he was adopted by Mark Jacobs, Jr. (1923–2005) into the Tlingit Dakl'aweidí clan with his brother Ernie Jacobs' name: Ghunaak'w.

He was an associate professor of anthropology at the University of Michigan before going to Dartmouth College, where he was granted tenure in 1993.

Kan's most recent publications reveal the relationship between Tlingit and anthropologists as well as American attitudes toward images of and relations with the Tlingit in the late 19th and early 20th centuries: "A long-standing interest in the peoples and cultures of the entire Pacific Northwest Coast has led me to co-editing (with an American and a French colleague) a volume of essays representing some of the major recent work in the field, this book, Coming to Shore: Northwest Coast Ethnology, Traditions and Visions, was published in 2004." In the fall of 2006 and the summer of 2010, Kan conducted ethnographic and archival research in southeastern Alaska on a new topic: a collection of photographs taken by Vincent Soboleff (a Russian-American photographer) in a Tlingit community of Killisnoo/Angoon in the 1890s-1920s. This project will result in a book entitled Vincent Soboleff: A Russian-American Photographer in Tlingit Country to be published by the University of Oklahoma Press.

His graduate training at the University of Chicago under Raymond D. Fogelson and many years of teaching courses on Native North American ethnology and ethnohistory, have inspired him to co-edit (with Pauline Turner Strong) a series of papers by several generations of North Americanists who have also been trained by the same mentor. This volume, which honors Fogelson and is entitled Perspectives on Native North America: Cultures, Histories, and Representations, was published in 2006. Finally, having always had a strong interest in the history of anthropology, he had been since the late 1990s working on an intellectual biography of Lev Shternberg, one of the leading Russian anthropologists of the late imperial and early Soviet period. This research took her to the Archive of the Russian Academy of Sciences in St. Petersburg. A book Lev Shternberg: Anthropologist, Russian Socialist, Jewish Activist, published in 2009, is the result of this work. In addition, in the last few years, he has published several articles (in English and Russian journals) on the history of Russian/Soviet anthropology and begun a new research project on the life and scholarly legacy of Alexander Goldenweiser (1880–1940), a prominent Russian-American anthropologist of the Boasian school.

In January 2018, he became the first foreign anthropologist to be a member of the editorial board of Etnograficheskoe Obozrenie.

In 2024, Kan was the lead signatory on a faculty letter expressing support for Dartmouth College president Sian Beilock, who ordered the arrests of 90 students and faculty members nonviolently protesting the Gaza war.

== Bibliography ==
- Kan, Sergei (1983) "Words That Heal the Soul: Analysis of the Tlingit Potlatch Oratory." Arctic Anthropology, vol. 20, no. 2, pp. 47–59.
- Kan, Sergei (1985) "Russian Orthodox Brotherhoods among the Tlingit: Missionary Goals and Native Response." Ethnohistory, vol. 32, no. 3, pp. 196–223.
- Kan, Sergei (1986) "The Nineteenth-Century Tlingit Potlatch: A New Perspective." American Ethnologist, vol. 13, no. 2, pp. 191–212.
- Kan, Sergei (1989) "Cohorts, Generations, and Their Culture: The Tlingit Potlatch in the 1980s." Anthropos, vol. 84, nos. 4–6.
- Kan, Sergei (1989) Symbolic Immortality: The Tlingit Potlatch of the Nineteenth Century. Washington: Smithsonian Institution Press.
- Kan, Sergei (1991) "Russian Orthodox Missionaries and the Tlingit Indians of Alaska, 1880-1890. In: New Dimensions in Ethnohistory, ed. by B. M. Gough and L. Christie, pp. 127-160. Ottawa: Canadian Museum of Civilization.
- Kan, Sergei (1991) "Shamanism and Christianity: Modern-Day Tlingit Elders Look at the Past." Ethnohistory, vol. 38, no. 4, pp. 363–387.
- Kan, Sergei (1996) "Clan Mothers to Godmothers: Tlingit Women and Russian Orthodox Christianity, 1840-1940." Ethnohistory, vol. 43, no. 4, pp. 613–641.
- Kan, Sergei (1999) Memory Eternal: Tlingit Culture and Russian Orthodox Christianity through Two Centuries. Seattle: University of Washington Press.
- Kan, Sergei (2001) "Friendship, Family, and Fieldwork: One Anthropologist's Adoption by Two Tlingit Families." In: Strangers to Relatives: The Adoption and Naming of Anthropologists in Native North America, ed. by Sergei Kan, pp. 185–217. Lincoln: University of Nebraska Press.
