= Demonstration effect =

Social psychology concept

Demonstration effects are effects on the behavior of individuals caused by observation of the actions of others and their consequences. The term is particularly used in political science and sociology to describe the fact that developments in one place will often act as a catalyst in another place.

== Examples ==
Parents may take care of their parents to create a demonstration effect by which their children later care for them.

Countries and local governments may adopt laws and economic policies similar to those that appear to demonstrate success elsewhere. The proven success of the policies provides a demonstration effect that leads other governments to attempt to emulate that success.

=== Tourism ===
The demonstration effect has been observed as a natural consequence of tourism. One study argues that the demonstration effect can be broken down into four forms: exact imitation, deliberately inexact imitation, accidental inexact imitation, and social learning.

=== Economics ===
In economics, demonstration effects may help explain the spread of financial or economic crises like the Asian financial crisis. Investors do not know everything about the economic situation of countries where they invest. When investors see a country's economy collapse, however, they may question the safety of investments in other countries with similar economic policies.

Some heterodox economists such as James Duesenberry and Robert H. Frank, following the original insights of Thorstein Veblen (1899), have argued that awareness of the consumption habits of others tends to inspire emulation of these practices. Duesenberry (1949) gave the name "demonstration effect" to this phenomenon, arguing that it promoted unhappiness with current levels of consumption, which impacted savings rates and consequently opportunities for macroeconomic growth. Similarly, Ragnar Nurkse (1953) argued that the exposure of a society to new goods or ways of living creates unhappiness with what had previously been acceptable consumption practices; he dubbed it the "international demonstration effect." He claimed that in developing nations, pressure to increase access to material goods rapidly increases, primarily because people "come into contact with superior goods or superior patterns of consumption, with new articles or new ways of meeting old wants." As a result, he argued, these people are "apt to feel after a while a certain restlessness and dissatisfaction. Their knowledge is extended, their imagination stimulated; new desires are aroused".

=== Political ===
In the late 18th century, the successful American Revolution may have provided a demonstration effect that sparked the subsequent French Revolution. Political movements may be given a boost from the observed success of similar movements in other countries. The domino effect thesis relates to this idea; it argued that communist revolutions in some countries would spread to other countries.
