= Reciprocity (evolution) =

Mechanism favouring cooperative traits

Reciprocity in evolutionary biology refers to mechanisms whereby the evolution of cooperative or altruistic behaviour may be favoured by the probability of future mutual interactions. A corollary is how a desire for revenge can harm the collective and therefore be naturally selected against.

== Main types ==
Three types of reciprocity have been studied extensively:

- Direct reciprocity
- Indirect
- Network reciprocity

== Direct reciprocity ==
Direct reciprocity was proposed by Robert Trivers as a mechanism for the evolution of cooperation. If there are repeated encounters between the same two players in an evolutionary game in which each of them can choose either to "cooperate" or "defect", then a strategy of mutual cooperation may be favoured even if it pays each player, in the short term, to defect when the other cooperates. Direct reciprocity can lead to the evolution of cooperation only if the probability, w, of another encounter between the same two individuals exceeds the cost-to-benefit ratio of the altruistic act: w > c / b

== Indirect reciprocity ==
"In the standard framework of indirect reciprocity, there are randomly chosen pairwise encounters between members of a population; the same two individuals need not meet again. One individual acts as donor, the other as recipient. The donor can decide whether or not to cooperate. The interaction is observed by a subset of the population who might inform others. Reputation allows evolution of cooperation by indirect reciprocity. Natural selection favors strategies that base the decision to help on the reputation of the recipient: studies show that people who are more helpful are more likely to receive help." In many situations cooperation is favoured and it even benefits an individual to forgive an occasional defection but cooperative societies are always unstable because mutants inclined to defect can upset any balance.

The calculations of indirect reciprocity are complicated, but again a simple rule has emerged. Indirect reciprocity can only promote cooperation if the probability, q, of knowing someone's reputation exceeds the cost-to-benefit ratio of the altruistic act:

q > c / b

One important problem with this explanation is that individuals may be able to evolve the capacity to obscure their reputation, reducing the probability, q, that it will be known.

Individual acts of indirect reciprocity may be classified as "upstream" or "downstream":

- Upstream reciprocity occurs when an act of altruism causes the recipient to perform a later act of altruism in the benefit of a third party. In other words: A helps B, which then motivates B to help C.
- Downstream reciprocity occurs when the performer of an act of altruism is more likely to be the recipient of a later act of altruism. In other words: A helps B, making it more likely that C will later help A.

== Network reciprocity ==
Real populations are not well mixed, but have spatial structures or social networks which imply that some individuals interact more often than others. One approach of capturing this effect is evolutionary graph theory, in which individuals occupy the vertices of a graph. The edges determine who interacts with whom. If a cooperator pays a cost, c, for each neighbor to receive a benefit, b, and defectors have no costs, and their neighbors receive no benefits, network reciprocity can favor cooperation. The benefit-to-cost ratio must exceed the average number of people, k, per individual:

b / c > k (See below, however.)

Recent work shows that the benefit-to-cost ratio must exceed the mean degree of nearest neighbors, ⟨k_{nn}⟩:

b / c > ⟨k_{nn}⟩

== Reciprocity in social dynamics ==
An ethical concept known as "generalized reciprocity" holds that people should show kindness to others without anticipating prompt return favors. This kind of reciprocity emphasizes the intrinsic value of humanitarian acts and goes beyond transactional expectations. In the field of social dynamics, generalized reciprocity encourages people to have a culture of giving and unity. When people engage in this type of reciprocity, they give without thinking about what they could get back, showing that they care about the general welfare of the community. It portrays a kind of social connection in where individuals give, share, or assist without anticipating anything in return.

This selfless involvement spreads outside of close circles, creating a domino effect that improves the well-being of everybody. Therefore, generalized reciprocity is evidence of the persistent value of selfless contributions in building strong, cohesive communities. Adopting this idea means being committed to the timeless values of giving and having faith in the natural flow of advantages for both parties.

== See also ==
- Ethic of reciprocity
- Generalized exchange
- Polytely
- Reciprocal altruism
