= Reciprocity (social and political philosophy) =

Concept in philosophy

The social norm of reciprocity is the expectation that people will respond to each other in similar ways—responding to gifts and kindnesses from others with similar benevolence of their own, and responding to harmful, hurtful acts from others with either indifference or some form of retaliation. Such norms can be crude and mechanical, such as a literal reading of the eye-for-an-eye rule lex talionis, or they can be complex and sophisticated, such as a subtle understanding of how anonymous donations to an international organization can be a form of reciprocity for the receipt of very personal benefits, such as the love of a parent.

The norm of reciprocity varies widely in its details from situation to situation, and from society to society. Anthropologists and sociologists have often claimed, however, that having some version of the norm appears to be a social inevitability. Reciprocity figures prominently in social exchange theory, evolutionary psychology, social psychology, cultural anthropology and rational choice theory.

== Patterns of reciprocity ==
One-to-one reciprocity. Some reciprocal relationships are direct one-to-one arrangements between individuals, or between institutions, or between governments. Some of these are one-time arrangements, and others are embedded in long-term relationships. Families often have expectations that children will reciprocate for the care they receive as infants by caring for their elderly parents; businesses may have long-term contractual obligations with each other: governments make treaties with each other.

There are also one-to-one reciprocal relationships that are indirect. For example, there are sometimes long chains of exchanges, in which A gives a benefit to B, who passes on a similar benefit to C, and so on, in which each party in the chain expects that what goes around will eventually come back around. The classic anthropological example is the Kula exchange in the Trobriand Islands of Papua New Guinea.

One-to-many and many-to-one reciprocity often lies somewhere between direct reciprocal arrangements and generalized reciprocity. Informal clubs in which the hosting arrangements circulate among members are examples of the one-to-many variety. Bridal showers are examples of the many-to-one variety. So are barn raising practices in some frontier communities. All of these are similar to direct reciprocity, since the beneficiaries are identified as such in each case, and contributors know exactly what they can expect in return. But because membership in the group changes, and needs for new meetings or marriages or barns are not always predictable, these cases differ significantly from precisely defined one-to-one cases.

Generalized reciprocity is even less precise. Here donors operate within a large network of social transactions largely unknown to each other, and without expectations about getting specific benefits in return — other than, perhaps, the sort of social insurance provided by the continuance of the network itself. Recipients may not know the donors, and may not themselves be able to make a return in-kind to that network, but perhaps feel obligated to make a return to a similar network. Blood banks and food banks are examples. But in fact any stable social structure in which there is a division of labor will involve a system of reciprocal exchanges of this generalized sort, as a way of sustaining social norms.

All of these patterns of reciprocity, along with related ideas such as gratitude, have been central to social and political philosophy from Plato onward. Reciprocity is mentioned in Aristotle's Nicomachean Ethics at Book 5, Chapter 5, Line 1: "Some think that reciprocity is without qualification just, as the Pythagoreans said", meaning that "Should a man suffer what he did, right justice would be done". Aristotle is stating the problems of this approach. And later he concludes that "…for this is characteristic of grace – we should serve in return one who has shown grace to us, and should another time take the initiative in showing it", and continues further with a formula of proportionate return. These philosophical discussions concern the ways in which patterns and norms of reciprocity might have a role in theories of justice, stable and productive social systems, healthy personal relationships, and ideals for human social life generally.

== The concept of reciprocity ==
Philosophical work on reciprocity often pays considerable attention, directly or indirectly, to the proper interpretation of one or more of the following conceptual issues.

Reciprocity as distinct from related ideas. In Plato's Crito, Socrates considers whether citizens might have a duty of gratitude to obey the laws of the state, in much the way they have duties of gratitude to their parents. Many other philosophers have considered similar questions. (See the references below to Sidgwick, English, and Jecker for modern examples.) This is certainly a legitimate question. Charging a child or a citizen with ingratitude can imply a failure to meet a requirement. But confining the discussion to gratitude is limiting. There are similar limitations in discussions of the do-unto-others golden rule, or ethical principles that are modeled on the mutuality and mutual benevolence that come out of the face-to-face relations envisaged by Emmanuel Levinas or the I-Thou relationships described by Martin Buber. Like gratitude, these other ideas have things in common with the norm of reciprocity, but are quite distinct from it.

Gratitude, in its ordinary sense, is as much about having warm and benevolent feelings toward one's benefactors as it is about having obligations to them. Reciprocity, in its ordinary dictionary sense, is broader than that, and broader than all discussions that begin with a sense of mutuality and mutual benevolence. (See the reference below to Becker, Reciprocity, and the bibliographic essays therein.) Reciprocity pointedly covers arm's-length dealings between egoistic or mutually disinterested people.

Moreover, norms of gratitude do not speak very directly about what feelings and obligations are appropriate toward wrongdoers, or the malicious. Reciprocity, by contrast, speaks directly to both sides of the equation – requiring responses in kind: positive for positive, negative for negative. In this, it also differs from the golden rule, which is compatible with forgiveness and "turning the other cheek" but has notorious difficulties as a basis for corrective justice, punishment, and dealing with people (e.g., masochists) who have unusual motivational structures.

Finally, the idea of enforcing, or carrying out a duty of gratitude, as well as calibrating the extent one's gratitude, seems inconsistent with the warm and benevolent feelings of "being grateful." There is a similar inconsistency in the idea of enforcing a duty to love. Reciprocity, by contrast, because it does not necessarily involve having special feelings of love or benevolence, fits more comfortably into discussions of duties and obligations. Further, its requirement of an in-kind response invites us to calibrate both the quality and the quantity of the response.

The norm of reciprocity thus requires that we make fitting and proportional responses to both the benefits and harms we receive – whether they come from people who have been benevolent or malicious. Working out the conceptual details of this idea presents interesting questions of its own. The following matters are all considered at length in many of the sources listed below under References, and those authors typically defend particular proposals about how best to define the conceptual details of reciprocity. What follows here is simply an outline of the topics that are under philosophical scrutiny.

Qualitative similarity. What counts as making a qualitatively appropriate or "fitting" response in various settings—positive for positive, negative for negative? If one person invites another to dinner, must the other offer a dinner in return? How soon? Must it be directly to the original benefactor, or will providing a comparable favor to someone else be appropriate? If the dinner one receives is unintentionally awful, must one reciprocate with something similarly awful? Sometimes an immediate tit-for-tat response seems inappropriate, and at other times it is the only thing that will do.

Are there general principles for assessing the qualitative appropriateness of reciprocal responses? Reflective people typically practice a highly nuanced version of the norm of reciprocity for social life, in which the qualitative similarity or fittingness of the response appears to be determined by a number of factors.

The nature of the transaction. One is the general nature of the transaction or relationship between the parties – the rules and expectations involved in a particular interaction itself. Tit for tat, defined in a literal way as an exchange of the identical kinds of goods (client list for client list, referral for referral) may be the only sort of reciprocal response that is appropriate in a clearly defined business situation. Similarly, dinner-for-dinner may be the expectation among members of a round robin dinner club. But when the nature of the transaction is more loosely defined, or is embedded in a complex personal relationship, an appropriate reciprocal response often requires spontaneity, imagination, and even a lack of premeditation about where, what, and how soon.

Fitting the response to the recipient. Another aspect of qualitative fit is what counts subjectively, for the recipient, as a response in-kind. When we respond to people who have benefited us, it seems perverse to give them things they do not regard as benefits. The general principle here is that, other things equal, a return of good for good received will require giving something that will actually be appreciated as good by the recipient – at least eventually. Similarly for the negative side. When we respond to bad things, reciprocity presumably requires a return that the recipient regards as a bad thing.

Unusual circumstances. A third aspect of qualitative fit is the presence or absence of circumstances that undermine the usual expectations about reciprocity. If a pair of friends often borrow each other's household tools, and one of them (suddenly deranged with anger) asks to borrow an antique sword from the other's collection, what is a fitting response? The example, in a slightly different form, goes back to Plato. The point is that in this unusual circumstance, reciprocity (as well as other considerations) may require that the recipient not get what he wants at the moment. Rather, it may be that the recipient should be given what he needs, in some objective sense, whether he ever comes to appreciate that it is good for him.

General rationale. A final determinant of qualitative fit is the general rationale for having the norm of reciprocity in the first place. For example, if the ultimate point of practicing reciprocity is to produce stable, productive, fair, and reliable social interactions, then there may be some tensions between things that accomplish this general goal and things that satisfy only the other three determinants. Responding to others' harmful conduct raises this issue. As Plato observed (Republic, Book I), it is not rational to harm our enemies in the sense of making them worse, as enemies or as people, than they already are. We may reply to Plato by insisting that reciprocity merely requires us to make them worse-off, not worse, period. But if it turns out that the version of the reciprocity norm we are using actually has the consequence of doing both, or at any rate not improving the situation, then we will have undermined the point of having it.

Quantitative similarity. Another definitional issue concerns proportionality. What counts as too little, or too much in return for what we receive from others? In some cases, such as borrowing a sum of money from a friend who has roughly the same resources, a prompt and exact return of the same amount seems right. Less will be too little, and a return with interest will often be too much, between friends. But in other cases, especially in exchanges between people who are very unequal in resources, a literal reading of tit-for-tat may be a perverse rule – one that undermines the social and personal benefits of the norm of reciprocity itself. How, for example, may badly disadvantaged people reciprocate for the public or private assistance they receive? Requiring a prompt and exact return of the benefit received may defeat the general purpose of the norm of reciprocity by driving disadvantaged people further into debt. Yet to waive the debt altogether, or to require only some discounted amount seems to defeat the purpose also.

Anglo-American legal theory and practice has examples of two options for dealing with this problem. One is to require a return that is equal to the benefit received, but to limit the use of that requirement in special cases. Bankruptcy rules are in part designed to prevent downward, irrecoverable spirals of debt while still exacting a considerable penalty. Similarly, there are rules for rescinding unconscionable contracts, preventing unjust enrichment, and dealing with cases in which contractual obligations have become impossible to perform. These rules typically have considerable transaction costs.

Another kind of option is to define a reciprocal return with explicit reference to ability to pay. Progressive tax rates are an example of this. Considered in terms of reciprocity, this option seems based on an equal sacrifice interpretation of proportionality, rather than an equal benefit one. Under an equal sacrifice rule, making a quantitatively similar return will mean giving something back whose marginal value to oneself, given one's resources, equals the marginal value of the sacrifice made by the original giver, given her resources.

== Reciprocity and justice ==
Standard usage of the term justice shows its close general connection to the concept of reciprocity. Justice includes the idea of fairness, and that in turn includes treating similar cases similarly, giving people what they deserve, and apportioning all other benefits and burdens in an equitable way. Those things, further, involve acting in a principled, impartial way that forbids playing favorites and may require sacrifices. All of those things are certainly in the neighborhood of the elements of reciprocity (e.g., fittingness, proportionality), but it is challenging to explain the precise connections.

=== Reward and punishment ===
Discussions of merit, desert, blame, and punishment inevitably involve questions about the fittingness and proportionality of our responses to others, and retributive theories of punishment put the norm of reciprocity at their center. The idea is to make the punishment fit the crime. This differs from utilitarian theories of punishment, which may use fittingness and proportionality as constraints, but whose ultimate commitment is to make punishment serve social goals such as general deterrence, public safety, and the rehabilitation of wrongdoers.

=== Justice and war ===
In just war theory, notions of fittingness and proportionality are central, at least as constraints both on the justification of a given war, and the methods used to prosecute it. When war represents a disproportionate response to a threat or an injury, it raises questions of justice related to reciprocity. When war fighting employs weapons that do not discriminate between combatants and noncombatants, it raises questions of justice related to reciprocity. A profound sense of injustice related to a lack of reciprocity – for example, between those privileged by socioeconomic status, political power, or wealth, and those who are less privileged, and oppressed – sometimes leads to war in the form of revolutionary or counterrevolutionary violence. It has been argued that the use of autonomous or remote controlled weaponized drones violate reciprocity. Political solutions which end the violence without dealing with the underlying injustice run the risk of continued social instability.

=== Legitimation of social, political, and legal obligations ===
A very deep and persistent line of philosophical discussion explores the way in which reciprocity can resolve conflicts between justice and self-interest, and can justify the imposition (or limitation) of social, political, and legal obligations that require individuals to sacrifice their own interests.

This aspect of the philosophical discussion of reciprocity attempts to bring together two ways of approaching a very basic question: What is the fundamental justification for the existence of social and political institutions – institutions that impose and enforce duties and obligations upon their members?

Individual well-being. One obvious answer is that people need to stay out of each other's way enough so that each can pursue his or her individual interests as far as possible, without interference from others. This immediately justifies rules that are mutually advantageous, but it raises questions about requiring obedience from people whenever it turns out that they will be disadvantaged by following the rules, or can get away with disobeying them. So the problem becomes one of showing whether, and when, it might actually be mutually advantageous to follow the rules of justice even when it is inconvenient or costly to do so.

Social contract theorists often invoke the value of reciprocal relationships to deal with this. Many human beings need help from one another from time to time in order to pursue their individual interests effectively. So if we can arrange a system of reciprocity in which all the benefits we are required to contribute are typically returned to us in full (or more), that may justify playing by the rules—even in cases where it looks as though we can get away with not doing so.

Social well-being. Another obvious answer to the question of why people organize themselves into groups, however, is in order to achieve levels of cooperation needed for improving society generally – for example by improving public health, and society-wide levels of education, wealth, or individual welfare. This also gives a reason for rules of justice, but again raises problems about requiring individuals to sacrifice their own welfare for the good of others—especially when some individuals might not share the particular goals for social improvements at issue.

Here too, the value of reciprocal relationships can be invoked, this time to limit the legitimacy of the sacrifices a society might require. For one thing, it seems perverse to require sacrifices in pursuit of some social goal if it turns out those sacrifices are unnecessary, or in vain because the goal cannot be achieved.

To some philosophers, a theory of justice based on reciprocity (or fairness, or fair play) is an attractive middle ground between a thoroughgoing concern with individual well-being and a thoroughgoing concern with social well-being. This has been part of the attraction of the most influential line of thought on distributive justice in recent Anglo-American philosophy – the one carried on in the context of John Rawls' work.

Future generations. It may also be that there is something to be gained, philosophically, from considering what obligations of generalized reciprocity present generations of human beings may have towards future ones. Rawls considers (briefly) the problem of defining a "just savings principle" for future generations, and treats it as a consequence of the interests people typically have in the welfare of their descendants, and the agreements fully reciprocal members of society would come to among themselves about such matters. Others (e.g., Lawrence C. Becker) have explored the intuitive idea that acting on behalf of future generations may be required as a generalized form of reciprocity for benefits received from previous generations.

== Mutuality ==
What is the relation between reciprocity and love, friendship or family relationships? If such relationships are ideally ones in which the parties are connected by mutual affection and benevolence, should not justice and reciprocity stay out of their way? Is impartiality consistent with love? Does not acting on principle take the affection out of friendship or family relationships? Does following the norm of reciprocity eliminate unconditional love or loyalty?

Some contemporary philosophers have criticized major figures in the history of Western philosophy, including John Rawls' early work, for making familial relationships more or less opaque in theories of justice. (See the reference below to Okin.) The argument is that families can be grossly unjust, and have often been so. Since the family is "the school of justice", if it is unjust the moral education of children is distorted, and the injustice tends to spread to the society at large, and to be perpetuated in following generations. If that is right, then justice and reciprocity must define the boundaries within which we pursue even the most intimate relationships.

A somewhat different thread on these matters begins with Aristotle's discussion of friendship, in Nicomachean Ethics 1155-1172a. He proposes that the highest or best form of friendship involves a relationship between equals – one in which a genuinely reciprocal relationship is possible. This thread appears throughout the history of Western ethics in discussions of personal and social relationships of many sorts: between children and parents, spouses, humans and other animals, and humans and god(s). The question is the extent to which the kind of reciprocity possible in various relationships determines the kind of mutual affection and benevolence possible in those relationships.

This said, Nick Founder in "Finding True Friends" (2015) observes that reciprocation in personal relationships rarely follows a mathematical formula and the level of reciprocation, i.e. the give and take, will vary depending on the personalities involved, and situational factors such as which party has more control, persuasive power or influence. It is often the case that one party will typically be the lead reciprocator with the other being the responsive reciprocator. The form of reciprocation can also be influenced by the level of emotional need. Sometimes one party will need more support than the other and this can switch at different times depending on the life situation of each party. Because reciprocation is influenced by personal circumstances and since people do not follow a set pattern like robots, reciprocation from a friend to a friend for example will vary in intensity and an absolutely consistent pattern cannot be expected. If, for example, a person has a large inner circle of friendships with reciprocation as the key element of friendship, then the level of reciprocation within the inner circle will influence the depth of a friendship therein. Reciprocation can be responsive or initiative. It is also a fundamental principle in parenting, a successful work place, religion and karma.

So for example, in the friendship context, reciprocation means to give or take mutually but not necessarily equally. Overall reciprocal balance is more important than strict equality at every moment. Friendship based on reciprocity means caring for each other, being responsive and supportive and in tune with each other. But without some form of overall reciprocal balance, the relationship may become transformed into a nonreciprocal form of friendship, or the friendship may fail altogether.

== See also ==
- Individualism
- Mutualism (economic theory)
- Reciprocal altruism
- Tit for tat
- Prisoner's dilemma
- Reciprocity (social psychology)
