= George C. Homans =

American sociologist (1910–1989)

George Caspar Homans
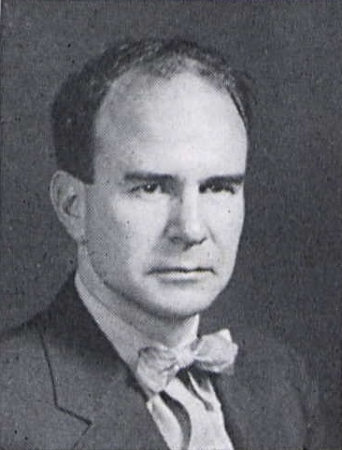
- Associate Professor of Sociology at Harvard in 1946
- Born: August 11, 1910; Boston, Massachusetts
- Died: May 29, 1989 (aged 78); Cambridge, Massachusetts
- Citizenship: United States
- Education: Harvard University (1932), Cambridge University (1955) (Masters)
- Known for: The Human Group, Social Behavior: Its Elementary Forms, Exchange Theory
- Scientific career
- Fields: Sociology

George Caspar Homans (August 11, 1910 – May 29, 1989) was an American sociologist, founder of behavioral sociology, the 54th president of the American Sociological Association, and one of the architects of social exchange theory. Homans is best known in science for his research in social behavior and his works The Human Group, Social Behavior: Its Elementary Forms, his contributions to exchange theory, and the different propositions he developed to explain social behavior. He is also the third great-grandson of the second President of the United States, John Adams.

== Background ==
George C. Homans was born in Boston on August 11, 1910, and grew up in Boston's Back Bay district, the son of Robert Homans and Abigail Adams-Homans. He was a direct descendant of American Presidents John Adams and John Quincy Adams, on his mother's side.

Homans attended St. Paul's School in Concord, New Hampshire, from 1923 to 1928.

Homans entered Harvard College in 1928 with a concentration in English and American literature. Although Homans came from a long line of lawyers and politicians, during his undergraduate years, he pursued poetry and developed a grand ambition to become a writer and poet. George published his original works in The Harvard Advocate, in which he was elected to the editorial board. After graduating in 1932, Homans wanted to pursue a career as a newspaperman with a "job beginning in the fall with William Allen White of the Emporia, Kansas, Gazette," but because of the Depression, the newspaper could no longer offer him the job, leaving Homans unemployed. "In 1941, he married Nancy Parshall Cooper, who remained his lifelong compatible partner."

Homans served in the Naval Reserve (1941); he always had a love for the sea. As an undergraduate, he assisted Samuel Eliot Morison in writing Massachusetts on the Sea, so much so that Morrison named Homans co-author. He served four and a half years on active duty, serving five years in the navy in total, more than two were spent in command of several small ships engaged in antisubmarine warfare and the escort of convoy operations. Although he served for the duration of the war, in his autobiography Coming to my Senses: The Education of Sociologist (1984), he later expressed his "impatience with the constraints of the naval hierarchy and his disdain for staff desk officers, especially those in bureaucratic branches such as the Supply Corps."

While Homans was at Harvard College, Homans met Bernard "Benny" de Voto, "a crusty man, cantankerous in his literary feuds whose name has been largely forgotten," who was a part-time member of the Harvard faculty and who tutored Homans in English. "George ... was attracted to de Voto's stories about the plains and the prairies, but more, to the actuality of the lives of people and the American character, as expressed in midwestern writing. In many ways, "George adopted the mannerisms of de Voto, the outwardly boisterous tones (but not for either the boosterist mentality) and the scorn of intellectualist rhetoric". Outwardly jaunty and self-assured, yet discreetly he was battling his own demons within his closed heart. He reserved all his pain and suffering for his poetry, which is seen in his book of poetry.

Homans describes his entrance to sociology as "a matter of chance; or rather, I got into sociology because I had nothing better to do". Lawrence Joseph Henderson, a biochemist and sociologist who believed that all sciences should be based on a unified set of theoretical and methodological principles, was an important influence on Homans' perspective. Homans attended Henderson's seminar one day at Harvard and was taken by his lecture. Homans was also influenced by Professor Elton Mayo, a psychologist studying human factors. Whom, Homans was assigned readings by prominent social anthropologists such as Bronisław Malinowski, Alfred Radcliffe-Brown, and Raymond Firth. From these readings, Homans developed his belief that instead of similarities in cultures, "members of the human species working in similar circumstances had independently created similar institutions." Homans argued, contrary to Anthropology that "cultures were not unique and what was more, their similarities could only be explained on the assumption that human nature was the same over the world."

Homans then joined a discussion group at Harvard called the Pareto Circle, which was led by Henderson and inspired by the work of Vilfredo Pareto. Henderson often discussed Pareto in his lectures. Pareto was a social scientist who was concerned with economic distribution. Pareto's theories and Henderson's lectures influenced Homans' first book, An Introduction to Pareto, co-authored with fellow Circle member Charles P. Curtis. From 1934 to 1939 Homans was selected to become a part of the Society of Fellows a newly formed institution founded by A. Lawrence Lowell at Harvard, undertaking a variety of studies in various areas, including sociology, psychology, and history. His comrades in the institution included Van Quine, Andrew Gleason, and B.F. Skinner most of whom went on to become Harvard professors. Skinner taught Homans about methods of observation and the idea of reinforcement. "One can say that, in nunc, George Homans's sociology was a blend of Skinnerian reinforcement with utility theory." For his junior fellowship project, Homans undertook an anthropological study of rural England, later published as English Villagers of the Thirteenth Century (1941), which he wrote instead of a Ph.D. that he never received. Homans was taken into the graduate program at Harvard; Pitirim Sorokin, founder of Harvard's sociology department in 1930, was credited with bringing Homans and Robert Merton into the program. From this knowledge gained, "the key idea that Homans took away from these studies was the centrality of interaction and the way sentiments developed between individuals as a consequence on interaction." Additionally, Homans graduated in 1955 with a master's degree from Cambridge University.

== Career ==
In 1939, Homans became a Harvard faculty member, a lifelong affiliation in which he taught both sociology and medieval history, "as well as studied poetry and small groups." This teaching brought him in contact with new works in industrial sociology and exposed him to the works of functional anthropologists. He was an instructor of sociology until 1941 when he left to serve in the U.S. Navy to support the war effort. After four years away, he came back to Boston and continued his teaching as an associate professor from 1946 to 1953, and a full professor of sociology after 1953. He was a Ford Foundation Fellow at Harvard's Graduate School of Business Administration. He was also a visiting professor at the University of Manchester in 1953, at Cambridge University from 1955 to 1956, and at the University of Kent in 1967. Homans was very dedicated to his students, and did not give any different treatment to neither his pupils nor those he worked with, he did not turn anyone away due to their age, sex, rank, or social status. He believed in the respectful discussion of academic arguments. By virtue of his various writings, he was elected a member of the American Academy of Arts and Sciences in 1956, a member of the American Philosophical Society in 1964, the 54th president of the American Sociological Association in 1964, and a member of the United States National Academy of Sciences in 1972. He retired from teaching in 1980.

== Death ==
George C. Homans died of a heart ailment on May 29, 1989, in Cambridge, Massachusetts.

== Legacy ==
George C. Homans left to the sociological world many works on social theory and is best known for his Exchange Theory and his works on social behavior. The impact he had on his students and colleagues and people he came in contact with is described by Charles Tilly in "George Caspar Homans and the Rest of Us": "His students inherited distrust of theory for its own sake and theories about theories. Even when they disagreed, his students and readers came away stimulated and refreshed. George was a vivifier, a life-giver" (Tilly, 1990:264).

== Work ==
=== The Human Group ===
Homans was impressed by Henderson's notion of a conceptual scheme, which consists of a classification of variables (or concepts) that need to be taken into account when studying a set of phenomena. It also consists of a sketch of the given conditions within which the phenomena are to be analyzed. It also must contain a statement that the variables are related to one another—and following Pareto, that relationship is usually seen as one of mutual dependence.

Homans was very interested in Henderson's conceptual scheme as a way of classifying phenomena and applied it to his own study of small groups. Henderson's teachings were included in Homans' work The Human Group (1950). This book's ultimate goal was to move from a study of the social system as it is exemplified in single groups toward a study of the system as it is exemplified in many groups, including groups changing in time. The work has a theme of, "the way group norms develop and the ways a group, consciously or unconsciously, seeks to maintain the cohesion of the group when members depart from group norms." Homans establishes that, "the general propositions would have to meet only one condition: in accordance with my original insight, they should apply to individual human beings as members of a species." According to Homans the sociologist's goal was to “move from a study of the social system as it is exemplified in single groups toward a study of the system as it is exemplified in many groups, including groups changing in time” (Homans 1949). By the late 1950s, Homans came slowly to the conclusion that human social systems were much less organic than what he had previously believed.

Homans said, "If we wanted to establish the reality of a social system as a complex of mutually dependent elements, why not begin by studying a system small enough so that we could, so to speak, see all the way around it, small enough so that all the relevant observations could be made in detail and at first hand?" He fulfilled this study throughout The Human Group. This book allowed him to make certain generalizations, including the idea that the more frequently people interact with one another when no one individually initiates interactions more than others, the greater their liking for one another and their feeling of ease in one another's presence. Although this wasn't Homans' greatest piece of work, it allowed him to become more familiar with this type of methodology and led him to explain elementary social behavior.

In this work, Homans also proposes that social reality should be described at three levels: social events, customs, and analytical hypotheses that describe the processes by which customs arise and are maintained or changed. Hypotheses are formulated in terms of relationships among variables such as frequency of interaction, similarity of activities, intensity of sentiment, and conformity to norms. Using notable sociological and anthropological field studies as the grounding for such general ideas, the book makes a persuasive case for treating groups as social systems that can be analyzed in terms of a verbal analogue of the mathematical method of studying equilibrium and stability of systems. In his theoretical analyses of these groups, he begins to use ideas that later loomed large in his work, e.g., reinforcement and exchange. Along the way, he treats important general phenomena such as social control, authority, reciprocity, and ritual.

=== Exchange Theory ===
Exchange Theory is the "perspective that individuals seek to maximize their own private gratifications. It assumes that these rewards can only be found in social interactions and thus people seek rewards in their interactions with each other". Homans' Exchange Theory propositions are partially based on B.F. Skinner's behaviorism. Homans took B.F. Skinner's propositions about pigeon behavior and applied it to human interactions. Homans argues that the pigeons in Skinner's study were involved in a one-sided exchange relationship, while humans are involved in at least two-sided relationships. He defined the pigeons' behavior as individual behavior as there was no reciprocation; Homans connected this type of behavior to psychology. In sociology, to study social behavior meant to study the activity of at least two individuals and the influences each has on the other. From this conclusion, Homans derives a number of propositions that relate to everyday experiences.

The heart of Homans' Exchange Theory lies in propositions based on economic and psychological principles. According to Homans, they are psychological for two reasons: first, because they are usually tested on people who call themselves psychologists, and second, because of the level at which they deal with the individual in society. While Homans makes the case for psychological principles, he acknowledged that human beings are social creatures and spend a considerable amount of time in socialization. He believed that a sociology built on his principles would be able to explain all social behavior. Homans said, "An incidental advantage of an exchange theory is that it might bring sociology closer to economics" (Homans 1958:598). Overall, Homans' exchange theory, "can be condensed to a view of the actor as a rational profit seeker."

He regretted that his theory was labeled "Exchange Theory" because he saw this theory of social behavior as a behavioral psychology applied to specific situations. Homans looked to Émile Durkheim's work for guidance as well but often disagreed in the end with particular components of Durkheim's theories. For example, Durkheim believed that although individuals are the parts of society, society is more than the individuals who constitute it. He believed that society could be studied without reducing it to individuals and their motivations. Homans, through his Exchange Theory, believed that individual beings and behavior are relevant to understanding society. While Homans agreed with Durkheim that something new emerges from social interaction, Homans argued that social facts can be explained through psychological principles, not through new sociological theories as Durkheim intended. To support this claim, Homans argued "the norm does not constrain automatically: individuals conform, when they do so, because they perceive it is to their net advantage to conform, and it is psychology that deals with the effect on behavior of perceived advantage (Homans, 1967:60).

=== Social Behavior and Propositions ===
Homans's next major work was Social Behavior: Its Elementary Forms. He wrote this book in 1961 and revised it in 1974. This was based on the principles of behavioral psychology and helped explain the "sub-institutional," or elementary, forms of social behavior in small groups. This explanation of social behavior first appeared in an article Homans published titled "Social Behavior as Exchange" in 1958. He believed his Exchange Theory was derived from both behavioral psychology and elementary economics. Elementary economics, also known as 'rational choice theory,' was set to explain how economics and human social behavior were tied together.

Homans had come to the view that theory should be expressed as a deductive system (deductive reasoning, a researcher tests a theory by collecting and examining empirical evidence to see if the theory is true.), in this respect falling under the influence of the logical empiricist philosophers of that period. Substantively, he argued that a satisfactory explanation in the social sciences is based upon "propositions"—principles—about individual behavior that are drawn from the behavioral psychology of the time. Homans didn't believe that new propositions are needed to explain social behavior. The laws of individual behavior developed by Skinner in his study of pigeons explain social behavior as long as we take into account the complications of mutual reinforcement.

Furthermore, he introduces some basic every day examples to help explain and give shape to his framework of the psychological propositions as sociological in nature, as well. Homans uses the workplace example, using "Person" to refer to an individual who is an employee at an office but needs more support than the regular co-workers. Then, he introduces "Other" as the other employee who - with more experience and competence - lends the first employee the help that he needs. Here, Homans emphasizes that "Other" has given aid to "Person" and that in exchange, "Person" then gives thanks and expresses his approval. With this, Homans points out the significance of the mutual exchange of help and approval between individuals.

=== The Success Proposition ===
"For all actions taken by persons, the more often a particular action of a person is rewarded, the more likely the person is to perform that action" (Homans, 1974:16).

To explain this framework, Homans uses his example of the office workplace and the social interaction between "Person" and "Other". In simple terms, Homans claims that the proposition is applicable when a person seeks advice from others. In this sense, a person will go back to the "Other" for advice if they see that their aid was useful and beneficial to them. In reciprocity, this makes them more comfortable to seek out advice or help from others and in return, they feel encouraged to give that same or other advice to those who seek their help as well. Homans explains that there are three stages to this proposition: 1) a person's action, 2) a rewarded result, and 3) a repetition of the original action.

Homans also lists three unique points about the success proposition. First, increasingly frequent regards will lead to increasingly frequent actions. The second point Homans made is that the shorter the amount of time between the behavior and reward, the more likely that person will repeat their behavior. Lastly, repeat behavior is more likely elicited when there are intermittent rewards rather than regular rewards.

=== Selected works ===
- English Villagers of the Thirteenth Century (1941)
- The Human Group (1950)
- Social Behavior: Its Elementary Forms (1961) [rev. ed. 1974]
- The Nature of Social Science (1967; gathers the Walker-Ames Lectures at the University of Washington in the summer of 1965)
- Coming to My Senses: The Autobiography of a Sociologist (1984)
- Certainties and Doubts (1987)
- Sentiments & Activities: Essays in Social Science (1962)
