= Social exchange theory =

Generalization theory explaining social behaviour regarding society and economics

Social exchange theory is a sociological and psychological theory that explains how people behave in relationships by using cost–benefit analysis to determine risks and benefits, expecting that what they give will lead to a fair return, and treating social relationships like economic exchanges (for romantic relationships specifically, see sexual economics) in which each person controls things the other values and decides whether to continue the relationship based on how beneficial and fair the exchange feels over time. Studies show that people expect a return benefit when they act well towards someone, and a punishment when they harm another person. Social exchange theory can be applied to a wide range of relationships, including romantic partnerships, friendships, family dynamics, professional relationships and other social exchanges. An example can be as simple as exchanging words with a customer at the cash register. In each context individuals are thought to evaluate the rewards and costs that are associated with that particular relationship. This can influence decisions regarding maintaining, deepening or ending the interaction or relationship. The Social exchange theory suggests that people will typically end something if the costs outweigh the rewards, especially if their efforts are not returned.

The most comprehensive social exchange theories are those of the American social psychologists John W. Thibaut (1917–1986) and Harold H. Kelley (1921–2003), the American sociologists George C. Homans (1910–1989), Peter M. Blau (1918–2002), Richard Marc Emerson (1925 –1982), and Claude Lévi-Strauss (1908–2009). Homans defined social exchange as the exchange of activity, tangible or intangible, and more or less rewarding or costing between at least two persons. After Homans founded the theory, other theorists continued to write about it, particularly Peter M. Blau and Richard M. Emerson, who in addition to Homans are generally thought of as the major developers of the exchange perspective within sociology. Homans' work emphasized the individual behavior of actors in interaction with one another. Although there are various modes of exchange, Homans centered his studies on dyadic exchange. John Thibaut and Harold Kelley are recognized for focusing their studies within the theory on the psychological concepts, the dyad and small group. Lévi-Strauss is recognized for contributing to the emergence of this theoretical perspective from his work on anthropology focused on systems of generalized exchange, such as kinship systems and gift exchange.

== Thibaut and Kelley ==
Thibaut and Kelley based their theory on small groups related with dyadic relationships. They used the reward-cost matrices from game theory and discovered some clues of individuals' interdependence such as the power of a party over each other, also known as the "correspondence" versus "noncorrespondence" of outcomes. Additionally, they suggest that an individual can unilaterally affect her or his own outcomes in a relationship through chosen behaviors. They could predict the possible course of a social interaction through the analysis of aspects of power in an encounter. They also experimented on how the outcomes received in a relationship could define a person's attractions to relationships.

== Homans ==
The foundation of the social exchange theory was first introduced by George C. Homans in 1958 based on his work "Social Behavior as Exchange", where he applied principles of behavior psychology and sociology to social interactions. Homans expanded his research in 1961 through "elementary forms of social behavior. Homans based his theory on concepts that include equilibration, expectancy, and a distributive justice in dyadic exchanges. Using this framework, he explained how people interact in small groups, showing that the rewards that they get are usually based on how much effort and resources that they contribute. Homans summarized his system with three main propositions: success, stimulus and deprivation-satiation propositions, described below.

1. Success proposition: When one finds they are rewarded for their actions, they tend to repeat the action.
2. Stimulus proposition: The more often a particular stimulus has resulted in a reward in the past, the more likely it is that a person will respond to it.
3. Deprivation–satiation proposition: The more often in the recent past a person has received a particular reward, the less valuable any further unit of that reward becomes.

== Blau ==
Blau's theory is very similar to Homans'. However, he uses more economics terms and it is based principally on emergent social structure in social exchange patterns in small groups. His theory analyzes the development of exchange theory in economics without emphasizing on the psychological assumptions. He contributed to the idea of distinguishing between social and economic exchanges and exchange and power. The goal of his theory was to identify complex and simple processes without ignoring emergent properties. Blau's utilitarian focus encouraged the theorist to look forward, as in what they anticipated the reward would be in regards to their next social interaction. Blau felt that if individuals focused too much on the psychological concepts within the theory, they would refrain from learning the developing aspects of social exchange. Blau emphasized technical economic analysis whereas Homans concentrated more on the psychology of instrumental behavior.

== Emerson ==
Emerson was inspired by Homans and Blau's ideas. He focused on the interaction and relationship between individuals and parties. His view of social exchange theory emphasizes the resource availability, power, and dependence as primary dynamics. He thought that relations were organized in different manners, and they could differ depending on the type and amount of the resources exchanged. He poses the idea that power and dependence are the main aspects that define a relationship. According to Emerson, Exchange is not a theory, but a framework from which other theories can converge and be compared to structural functionalism. Emerson's perspective was similar to Blau's since they both focused on the relationship power had with the exchange process. Emerson says that social exchange theory is an approach in sociology that is described for simplicity as an economic analysis of noneconomic social situations. Exchange theory brings a quasi-economic form of analysis into those situations.

== Lévi-Strauss ==
Strauss was a social exchange theorist in the context of anthropology. He is recognized for contributing to the emergence of this theoretical perspective from his work on anthropology focused on systems of generalized exchange, such as kinship systems and gift exchange. He based his kinship systems on Mauss's investigation. As it works in the form of indirect reciprocities, Levi-Strauss suggested the concept of generalized exchange.

== Self-interest and interdependence ==
Self-interest and interdependence are central properties of social exchange. These are the basic forms of interaction when two or more actors have something of value to each other, and they have to decide whether to exchange and in what amounts. Homans uses the concepts of individualism to explain exchange processes. To him, the meaning of individual self-interest is a combination of economic and psychological needs. Fulfilling self-interest is often common within the economic realm of the social exchange theory where competition and greed can be common. In social exchange, self-interest is not a negative thing; rather, when self-interest is recognized, it will act as the guiding force of interpersonal relationships for the advancement of both parties' self-interest"—Michael Roloff (1981) Thibaut and Kelley see the mutual interdependence of persons as the central problem for the study of social behavior. They developed a theoretical framework based on the interdependence of actors. They also highlighted social implications of different forms of interdependence such as reciprocal control. According to their interdependence definition, outcomes are based on a combination of parties' efforts and mutual and complementary arrangements.

== Basic concepts ==
Social exchange theory views exchange as a social behavior that may result both in economic and social outcomes. Social exchange theory has been generally analyzed by comparing human interactions with the marketplace. The study of the theory from the microeconomics perspective is attributed to Blau. Under his perspective every individual is trying to maximize his wins. Blau stated that once this concept is understood, it is possible to observe social exchanges everywhere, not only in market relations, but also in other social relations like friendship. Social exchange process brings satisfaction when people receive fair returns for their expenditures. The major difference between social and economic exchange is the nature of the exchange between parties. Neoclassic economic theory views the actor as dealing not with another actor but with a market and environmental parameters, such as market price. Unlike economic exchange, the elements of social exchange are quite varied and cannot be reduced to a single quantitative exchange rate. According to Stafford, social exchanges involve a connection with another person; involve trust and not legal obligations; are more flexible; and rarely involve explicit bargaining.

=== Cost and rewards ===
Simple social exchange models assume that rewards and costs drive relationship decisions. Both parties in a social exchange take responsibility for one another and depend on each other. The elements of relational life include:

Costs are the elements of relational life that have negative value to a person, such as the effort put into a relationship and the negatives of a partner. (Costs can be time, money, effort etc.)

Rewards are the elements of a relationship that have positive value. (Rewards can be sense of acceptance, support, and companionship etc.)

As with everything dealing with the social exchange theory, it has as its outcome satisfaction and dependence of relationships. The social-exchange perspective argues that people calculate the overall worth of a particular relationship by subtracting its costs from the rewards it provides.

Worth = Rewards − Costs

If worth is a positive number, it is a positive relationship. On the contrary, a negative number indicates a negative relationship. The worth of a relationship influences its outcome, or whether people will continue with a relationship or terminate it. Positive relationships are expected to endure, whereas negative relationships will probably terminate. In a mutually beneficial exchange, each party supplies the wants of the other party at lower cost to self than the value of the resources the other party provides. In such a model, mutual relationship satisfaction ensures relationship stability.

Outcome = Rewards − Costs

Homans based his theory on behaviorism to conclude that people pursue rewards to minimize costs. The "satisfactory-ness" of the rewards that a party gains from an exchange relationship is judged relative to some standard, which may vary from party to party.

=== Reciprocity norm ===
Summarized by Gouldner, the reciprocity norm states that a benefit should be returned and the one who gives the benefit should not be harmed. This is used to stabilize relationships and to identify egoism. This norm suggests independence in relationships and invite the individual to consider more than one's self-interest.

=== Social penetration theory ===
Altman and D. Taylor introduced social penetration theory, which studies the nature and quality of social exchange and close bonds. It suggests that once the individuals start to give more of their resources to one another, relationships evolve progressively from exchanging superficial goods to other, more meaningful exchanges. It progresses to the point called "self-disclosure", where the individuals share innermost thoughts and feelings with one another.

=== Equity and inequity ===
In this process, the individuals will compare their rewards with others' in relation to their costs. Equity can be defined as the balance between a person's inputs and outcomes on the job. Some examples of inputs can be qualifications, promotions, interest on the job and how hard one works. Some outcomes can be pay, fringe benefits, and power status. The individual will mainly expect an equitable input-outcome ratio. Inequity happens when the individual perceives an unbalanced ratio of their outcomes and other's outcomes. This can occur in a direct exchange of the two parties, or there can be a third party involved. An individual's point of view of equity or inequity can differ depending on the individual.

== Aging ==
The basis of social exchange theory is to explain social change and stability as a process of negotiating exchanges between parties. These changes can occur over a person's life course through the various relationships, opportunities, and means of support. An example of this is the convoy model of support, this model uses concentric circles to describe relationships around an individual with the strongest relationships in the closet circle. As a person ages, these relationships form a convoy that moves along with the person and exchanges in support and assistance through different circumstances that occur. It also changes through the directionality of support given to and by the individual with the people within their support network. Within this model, there are different types of support (social support) a person can receive, those being intangible, tangible, instrumental, and informational. Intangible support can either be social or emotional and can be love, friendship and appreciation that comes with valuable relationships. Tangible support are physical gifts given to someone such as land, gifts, money, transportation, food, and completing chores. Instrumental support are services given to someone in a relationship. Finally, informational support is the delivering of information that is helpful to an individual.

== Theoretical propositions ==
=== Ivan Nye ===
Ivan Nye came up with twelve theoretical propositions that aid in understanding the exchange theory.

1. Rewards being equal, they choose alternatives from which they anticipate the fewest costs.
2. Immediate outcomes being equal, they choose those alternatives that promise better long-term outcomes.
3. Long-term outcomes being perceived as equal, they choose alternatives providing better immediate outcomes.
4. Costs and other rewards being equal, individuals choose the alternatives that supply or can be expected to supply the most social approval (or those that promise the least social disapproval).
5. Costs and other rewards being equal, individuals choose statuses and relationships that provide the most autonomy.
6. Other rewards and costs equal, individuals choose alternatives characterized by the least ambiguity in terms of expected future events and outcomes.
7. Other costs and rewards equal, they choose alternatives that offer the most security for them.
8. Other rewards and costs equal, they choose to associate with, marry, and form other relationships with those whose values and opinions generally are in agreement with their own and reject or avoid those with whom they chronically disagree.
9. Other rewards and costs equal, they are more likely to associate with, marry, and form other relationships with their equals, than those above or below them. (Equality here is viewed as the sum of abilities, performances, characteristics, and statuses that determine one's desirability in the social marketplace.)
10. In industrial societies, other costs and rewards equal, individuals choose alternatives that promise the greatest financial gains for the least financial expenditures.

In his article published in 1978, Nye originally proposed seven propositions that were common in all types of relationship. A few years later he would expand the propositions to a total of twelve. The first five propositions listed are classified as general propositions and are substance free-meaning, the propositions themselves can stand alone within the theory. Proposition number six has been identified by scholars as a notion that there is a general assumption of a need for social approval as a reward and can therefore act as a drive force behind actions. Proposition seven will only work if the individual has the freedom to be excluded from outside factors while in a social exchange relationship. The twelfth and final proposition is directed towards the way our society has a heightened value placed on monetary funds.

=== Homans ===
Even though Homans took an individualistic approach, a major goal of his work was to explicate the micro-foundations of social structures and social exchange. By studying such forms of behavior he hoped to illuminate the informal sub-institutional bases of more complex social behavior, typically more formal and often institutionalized. According to Homans, social structures emerge from elementary forms of behavior. His vision of the underpinnings of social structure and institutional forms is linked to the actions of individuals, for example to their responses to rewarding and punishment circumstances.

Homans developed five key propositions that assist in structuring individuals' behaviors based on rewards and costs. This set of theoretical ideas represents the core of Homans's version of social exchange theory.

- The first proposition: the success proposition states that behavior that creates positive outcomes is likely to be repeated.
- The second proposition: the stimulus proposition believes that if an individual's behavior is rewarded in the past, the individual will continue the previous behavior.
- The third proposition: the value proposition believes that if the result of a behavioral action is considered valuable to the individual, it is more likely for that behavior to occur.
- The fourth proposition: the deprivation-satiation proposition believes that if an individual has received the same reward several times, the value of that reward will diminish.
- The fifth proposition discusses when emotions occur due to different reward situations. Those who receive more than they expect or do not receive anticipated punishment will be happy and will behave approvingly.

=== Frazer ===
Based on economics, Frazer's theory about social exchange emphasizes the importance of power and status differentiations in social exchange. Frazer's theory had a particular interest in the cross-cousin marriage.

=== Malinowski ===
With his Kula exchange, Malinowski drew a sharp differentiation between economic exchange and social exchange. Using his Kula exchange, Malinowski states that the motives of exchange can be mainly social and psychological.

=== Mauss ===
Mauss's theory tries to identify the role played by morality and religion in the social exchange. Mauss argues the exchange found in the society is influenced by social behaviors, while morality and religion influence all aspects of life.

=== Bohannan ===
Bohannan focuses his theory on economic problems such as multi-centrism, and modes of exchange. He contributed to the social exchange theory finding the role and function of markets in tribal subsistence economies, makes a distinction of economic redistribution and market exchange from social relationships.

=== Polanyi ===
He proposes three principles to create a new idea for socioeconomic change, transforming traditional economies, and political economic development. These principles are: reciprocity, redistribution and marketing.

=== Sahlins ===
He presents the idea that the economy is a category of behavior instead of just a simple category of culture.

== Assumptions ==
Social exchange theory is not one theory but a frame of reference within which many theories can speak to another, whether in argument or mutual support. All these theories are built upon several assumptions about human nature and the nature of relationships. Thibaut and Kelley have based their theory on two conceptualizations: one that focuses on the nature of individuals and one that describes the relationships between two people. Thus, the assumptions they make also fall into these categories.

The assumptions that social exchange theory makes about human nature include the following:

- Humans seek rewards and avoid punishments.
- Humans are rational beings.
- The standards that humans use to evaluate costs and rewards vary over time and from person to person.

The assumptions social exchange theory makes about the nature of relationships include the following:

- Relationships are interdependent.
- Relational life is a process.

Social systems result from human activity and function as structures designed to organize, guide, and regulate human affairs. However, variations exist in how costs and benefits are weighed depending on the actors involved, as well as in the interpretation, adoption, enforcement, neglect, and application of norms and sanctions.

Furthermore, regarding human nature, the prisoner's dilemma is a widely used example in game theory that attempts to illustrate why or how two individuals may not cooperate with each other, even if it is in their best interest to do so. It demonstrates that while cooperation would give the best outcome, people might nevertheless act selfishly. All relationships involve exchanges, and the balance of these exchanges is considered fair when they are equitable.

== Comparison levels ==
Social exchange includes "both a notion of a relationship, and some notion of a shared obligation in which both parties perceive responsibilities to each other". John Thibaut and Harold Kelley proposed two comparison standards to differentiate between relationship satisfaction and relationship stability. This evaluation rests on two types of comparisons: comparison level and comparison level for alternative. According to Thibaut and Kelley, the comparison level (CL) is a standard representing what people feel they should receive in the way of rewards and costs from a particular relationship. An individual's comparison level can be considered the standard by which an outcome seems to satisfy the individual. The comparison level for alternative (CLalt) refers to "the lowest level of relational rewards a person is willing to accept given available rewards from alternative relationships or being alone". In other words, when using this evaluation tool, an individual will consider other alternative payoffs or rewards outside of the current relationship or exchange. CLalt provides a measure of stability rather than satisfaction. If people see no alternative and fear being alone more than being in the relationship, social exchange theory predicts they will stay.

== Modes of exchange ==
According to Kelley and Thibaut, people engage in behavioral sequence, or a series of actions designed to achieve their goal. This is congruent with their assumption that human beings are rational. When people engage in these behavioral sequences, they are dependent to some extent on their relational partner. In order for behavioral sequences to lead to social exchange, two conditions must be achieved: "It must be oriented towards ends that can only be achieved through interaction with other persons, and it must seek to adapt means to further the achievement of these ends". The concept of reciprocity also derives from this pattern. The reciprocity principle refers to the mutual reinforcement by two parties of each other's actions. The process begins when at least one participant makes a "move", and if the other reciprocates, new rounds of exchange initiate. Once the process is in motion, each consequence can create a self-reinforcing cycle. Even though the norm of reciprocity may be a universally accepted principle, the degree to which people and cultures apply this concept varies.

=== Power dependence relations ===
Several definitions of power have been offered by exchange theorists. For instance, some theorists view power as distinct from exchanges, some view it as a kind of exchange and others believe power is a medium of exchange. However, the most useful definition of power is that proposed by Emerson, who developed a theory of power-dependence relations. According to this theory, the dependence a person has on another brings up the concept of power. Power differentiation affects social structures by causing inequalities between members of different groups, such as an individual having superiority over another. Power within the theory is governed by two variables : the structure of power in exchange networks and strategic use. Experimental data show that the position an actor occupies in a social exchange network determines relative dependence and therefore power.

According to Thibaut and Kelley, there are two types of power: fate control and behavior control. Fate control is the ability to affect a partner's outcomes. Behavior control is the power to cause another's behavior to change by changing one's own behavior.

=== Matrices ===
People develop patterns of exchange to cope with power differentials and to deal with the costs associated with exercising power. These patterns describe behavioral rules or norms that indicate how people trade resources in an attempt to maximize rewards and minimize costs. Three different matrices have been described by Thibaut and Kelley to illustrate the patterns people develop. These are given matrix, the effective matrix and the dispositional matrix.

- The given matrix represents the behavioral choices and outcomes that are determined by a combination of external factors (environment) and internal factors (the specific skills each interactant possesses).
- The effective matrix "which represents an expansion of alternative behaviors and/or outcomes which ultimately determines the behavioral choices in social exchange"
- The dispositional matrix represents the way two people believe that rewards ought to be exchanged between them.

There are three forms within these matrices: Reciprocity, Generalized Exchange, and Productive Exchange. In a direct exchange, reciprocation is confined to the two actors. One social actor provides value to another one and the other reciprocates. There are three different types of reciprocity:

1. Reciprocity as a transactional pattern of interdependent exchanges
2. Reciprocity as a folk belief
3. Reciprocity as a moral norm

A generalized exchange involves indirect reciprocity between three or more individuals. For example, one person gives to another and the recipient responds by giving to another person other than the first person. Productive exchange means that both actors have to contribute for either one of them to benefit. Both people incur benefits and costs simultaneously.

Another common form of exchange is negotiated exchange which focuses on the negotiation of rules in order for both parties to reach a beneficial agreement. Reciprocal exchanges and negotiated exchanges are often analyzed and compared to discover their essential differences. One major difference between the two exchanges is the level of risks associated with the exchange and the uncertainty these risks create (ref). Negotiated exchange can consist of binding and non-binding negotiations. When comparing the levels of risk within these exchanges, reciprocal exchange has the highest level of risk which in result produces the most uncertainty. An example of a risk that could occur during the reciprocal exchange is the factor that the second party could end up not returning the favor and completing the reciprocal exchange. Binding negotiated exchanges involve the least amount of risks which will result the individuals feeling low levels of uncertainty. Whereas non-binding negotiated exchanges and their level of risks and uncertainty fall in between the amount of risks associated with reciprocal and binding negotiated exchanges. Since there is not a binding agreement involved, one party involved in the exchange could decide to not cooperate with the agreement.

== Critiques ==
Katherine Miller outlines several major objections to or problems with the social exchange theory as developed from early seminal works

- The theory reduces human interaction to a purely rational process that arises from economic theory.
- The theory favors openness as it was developed in the 1970s when ideas of freedom and openness were preferred, but there may be times when openness isn't the best option in a relationship.
- The theory assumes that the ultimate goal of a relationship is intimacy when this might not always be the case.
- The theory places relationships in a linear structure, when some relationships might skip steps or go backwards in terms of intimacy.

Recent scholars, Russell Cropanzano and Marie S. Mitchell discuss how one of the major issues within the social exchange theory is the lack of information within studies on the various exchange rules. They suggest that the Social Exchange Theory should include psychological and emotional exchanges which are less visible but just as important. Reciprocity is a major exchange rule discussed but, Cropanzano and Mitchell write that the theory would be better understood if more research programs discussed a variety of exchange rules such as altruism, group gain, status consistency and competition. Meeker points out that within the exchange process, each unit takes into account at least the following elements: reciprocity, rationality, altruism (social responsibility), group gain, status, consistency, and competition (rivalry).

Rosenfeld (2005) has noted significant limitations to Social Exchange Theory and its application in the selection of mates/partners. Specifically, Rosenfeld looked at the limitations of interracial couples and the application of social exchange theory. His analysis suggest that in modern society, there is less of a gap between interracial partners education level, socioeconomic status, and social class level which in turn, makes the previously understood application of social exchange moot.

== Applications ==
The most extensive application of social exchange has been in the area of interpersonal relationships. However, social exchange theory materializes in many different situations with the same idea of the exchange of resources. Self-Interest can encourage individuals to make decisions that will benefit themselves overall. Homans once summarized the theory by stating:

Social behavior is an exchange of goods, material goods but also non-material ones, such as the symbols of approval or prestige. Persons that give much to others try to get much from them, and persons that get much from others are under pressure to give much to them. This process of influence tends to work out at equilibrium to a balance in the exchanges. For a person in an exchange, what he gives may be a cost to him, just as what he gets may be a reward, and his behavior changes less as the difference of the two, profit, tends to a maximum ("Theories Used in Research").

=== Anthropology ===
Other applications that developed the idea of exchange include field of anthropology as evidenced in an article by Harumi Befu, which discusses cultural ideas and norms. Lévi-Strauss is considered as one of the major contributors to the anthropology of exchange. Within this field, self-interest, human sentiment and motivational process are not considered. Lévi–Strauss uses a collectivist approach to explain exchanges. To Lévi-Strauss, a social exchange is defined as a regulated form of behavior in the context of societal rules and norms. This contrasts with psychological studies of exchange in which behaviors are studied ignoring the culture. Social exchanges from the anthropological perspective have been analyzed using the gift-giving phenomena. The concept of reciprocity under this perspective states that individuals can directly reward his benefactor or another person in the social exchange process. Lévi-Strauss developed the theory of cousin marriage based on the pervasiveness of gift-giving in primitive societies. The basis of this theory is the distinction between restricted exchanges, which is only capable of connecting pairs of social groups, and generalize exchange, which integrates indefinite numbers of groups.

=== Relationships ===
Throughout the theory, one can also end up losing relationships that were already established because the feeling of no longer being beneficial. One feels as if there is not longer a need for a relationship or communication due to lack of rewards. Once this happens, the process of looking for new partners and resources occurs. This allows a continuation of networking. One may go through this process quite frequently. A study applied this theory to new media (online dating). The study discovers the different factors involved when an individual decides to establish an online relationship. Overall the study followed the social exchange theory's idea, "people are attracted to those who grant them rewards".Another study done by Nakonezny, Paul A., and Wayne H. Denton in the American Journal of Family Therapy suggests the idea of cost/benefit to relationships. The authors argue that in romantic relationships, one person treats the other the way he or she expects to be treated. In other words, the authors found that perceptions of fairness and reciprocity play a central role in relationship satisfaction. The author also discovered that the overall way a person in a romantic relationship evaluates happiness is how fairly they are being treated by the other person. This shows the idea of cost/benefit in romantic relationships as well: if someone doesn't feel treated right, that person is less likely to stay in that relationship, according to the study.

Another example is Berg's study about development of friendship between roommates. The research found how social exchange processes changed during the year by measuring self disclosure. According to the study, the amount one person rewards another and the comparison levels for alternatives become the most important factors in determining liking and satisfaction. Auld, C. and Alan C. conducted a study to discover what processes occur and what is experienced during social leisure relationships. They use the concept of reciprocity to understand their findings. The study concluded that meeting new people is often given as a major reason for participation in leisure activities, and meeting new people may be conceptualized as an exercise of reciprocity. In this case, reciprocity is perceived as a starting mechanism for new social relationships because people are willing to be helped by others, expecting that the help will eventually be returned. A study conducted by Paul, G., called Exchange and access in field work tries to understand the relationships between the researchers and subjects. This study concludes that Bargaining helps to satisfy the more specific needs of the parties because greater risks are taken to obtain more information. This study also introduces the concept of trust (social sciences) to determine the duration of relationships.

=== Interracial marriage ===
Patterns of interracial marriage have been explained using social exchange theory. Kalmijn suggests that ethnic status is offset against educational or financial resources. This process has been used to explain why there are more marriages between black men and white women than between white men and black women. This asymmetry in marriage patterns has been used to support the idea of a racial hierarchy. Lewis, however, explains that the same patterns of marriage can be accounted for in terms of simple facial attractiveness patterns of the different gender by race groupings. Recent changes have seen an increase in black women marrying white men and a decrease in raw prevalence of interracial marriages when it comes to black women. There has also been a shift in the concentration of interracial marriage from mostly being between those with low education levels to those with higher levels of education.

=== Business ===
Social exchange theory has served as a theoretical foundation to explain different situations in business practices. It has contributed to the study of organization-stakeholder relationships, supply network relationships, and relationship marketing. The investment model proposed by Caryl Rusbult is a useful version of social exchange theory. According to this model, investments serve to stabilize relationships. The greater the nontransferable investments a person has in a given relationship, the more stable the relationship is likely to be. The same investment concept is applied in relationship marketing. Databases are the major instrument to build differentiated relationships between organizations and customers. Through the information process, companies identify the customer's own individual needs. From this perspective, a client becomes an investment. If a customer decides to choose another competitor, the investment will be lost. When people find they have invested too much to quit a relationship or enterprise, they devote additional resources to the relationship to salvage their initial investment.

Exchange has been a central research thrust in business-to-business relational exchange. According to a study conducted by Lambe, C. Jay, C. Michael Wittmann, and Robert E. Spekman, firms evaluate economic and social outcomes from each transaction and compare them to what they feel they deserve. Firms also look for additional benefits provided by other potential exchange partners. The initial transaction between companies is crucial to determining whether their relationship will expand, remain the same or will dissolve. Holmen and Pedersen note that social exchange theory has contributed to the understanding of "connected" business relationships between firms.Apart from business-to-business applications, research by Sierra, Jeremy J, and Shaun McQuitty, published in the Journal of Services Marketing, uncovered applications of social exchange theory to business-to-customers relationships as well. The research has found that positive service interactions are associated with increased customer loyalty and repeat patronage, suggesting that social exchange might apply to business-to-customer relationships as it does to business-to-business relationships.

=== Work settings ===
A study conducted by A. Saks serves as an example to explain engagement of employees in organizations. This study uses one of the tenets of social exchange theory to explain that obligations are generated through a series of interactions between parties who are in a state of reciprocal interdependence. The research identified that when individuals receive economic and socioemotional resources from their organization, they feel obliged to respond in kind and repay the organization. This is a description of engagement as a two-way relationship between the employer and employee. One way for individuals to repay their organization is through their level of engagement. The more engaged the employee are to their work, the greater amounts of cognitive, emotional, and physical resources they will devote to perform their job duties. When the organization fails to provide economic or emotional resources, the employees are more likely to withdraw and disengage themselves from their roles.

Another more recent study by M. van Houten which took place in institutions for vocational education shows how, in social exchange relationships between teachers, reciprocity and feelings of ownership, affection and interpersonal safety impact on individual professionals´ decisions on what to share with whom. Colleagues who never ´pay back´ and make actual exchange happen (that is, who consume rather than produce and share), risk being left out. The study also points out the possibility of ´negative rewards´: exchange of one's knowledge, materials or otherwise may enable someone else the misuse that what was shared and/or take credit somewhere in the team or organization. As such, interpersonal relationships and ´fair´ exchange appear important, as does some kind of mechanism for rewards and gratitude (possibly organization-wide), as these impact on individual professional discretion and the degree and success of exchange.

A study by Chernyak-Hai, Lily, and Edna Rabenu raises the question of whether social exchange is still valued today, as more people are working hybrid or remote jobs. The authors argue that because people are not regularly interacting face-to-face, the importance of social theory is not as great as it was before. On the other hand, a study by Yin, Ning argues that social exchange remains a relevant factor in today’s work environment and that workers who feel valued and are treated well tend to be more productive than those who are not, showing the cost-benefit analysis that is the heart of the social exchange theory. The author presents points showing that, regardless of whether people work in hybrid or remote jobs, social exchange theory still applies to them because of the productivity increase.

=== Leadership ===
Leadership research often draws on social exchange theory to explain how leaders influence various leadership outcomes such as organizational citizenship behavior and job performance. Critics have argued, however, that leadership research tends to oversimplify the theory, reducing it as leader-initiated, static, and neglecting the role of individual identity and organizational context.

=== Citizenship behavior ===
Social exchange theory is a theoretical explanation for organizational citizenship behavior. This study examines a model of clear leadership and relational building between head and teachers as antecedents, and organizational citizenship behavior as a consequence of teacher–school exchange. Citizenship behavior can also be shown with employees and their employers. This is shown through organizational identification which plays an important role in organizational citizenship behavior. An employee's identification with their employer plays a significant role in supporting and promoting organized citizenship behavior, serving as a mediating mechanism with citizenship behaviors, perceived organizational justice, and organizational support based on both the social exchange and social identity theory.

=== Online social networking and self-disclosure ===
Understanding interpersonal disclosure in online social networking is an ideal application of social networking theory. Researchers have leveraged SET to explain self-disclosure in a cross-cultural context of French and British working professionals. They discover that reciprocation is the primary benefit of self-disclosure, whereas risk is the foundational cost of self-disclosure. They find that positive social influence to use an online community increases online community self-disclosure; reciprocity increases self-disclosure; online community trust increases self-disclosure; and privacy risk beliefs decrease self-disclosure. Meanwhile, a tendency toward collectivism increases self-disclosure. Similar research also leveraged SET to examine privacy concerns versus desire for interpersonal awareness in driving the use of self-disclosure technologies in the context of instant messaging. This study was also a cross-cultural study, but instead compared US and Chinese participants.

== Affect theory ==
Traditionally actors in the social exchange theory are often viewed as individuals who are rational decision makers that weigh costs and rewards without emotion. The affect theory of social exchange complements social exchange theory by incorporating emotion as part of the exchange process. The affect theory developed by Lawler (2001), challenges this by showing that emotions play an integral role in social exchanges. The affect theory examines the structural conditions of exchange that produce emotions and feelings and then identifies how individuals attribute these emotions to different social units (exchange partners, groups, or networks). These attributions of emotion, in turn, dictate how strongly individuals feel attached to their partners or groups, which drives collectively oriented behavior and commitment to the relationship. When individuals experience positive emotions in group or partner-based exchanges it strengthens bonds and encourages group commitment.

=== Assumptions ===
Most social exchange models have three basic assumptions in common: social behavior is based on exchanges, if an individual allows someone to receives a reward that person then feels the need to reciprocate due to social pressure. Additionally, individuals will try to minimize their cost while gaining the most from the reward. The affect theory of social exchange is based on assumptions that stem from social exchange theory and affect theory:

- There are three or more individuals who have the opportunity to make exchanges with one another. These actors are able to make decisions about whether to exchange, with whom to exchange, and under what terms to execute an exchange.
- Social exchange produces emotions that are positive to negative
- Emotions can be construed as reward or punishment (i.e. feeling good has a positive value and feeling bad has a negative value).
- Individuals try to avoid negative emotions and to reproduce positive emotions in social exchange.
- Individuals will try to understand the source or cause of feelings produced by social exchange. In this way, emotions become attributed to the object that caused them.
- Individuals interpret and exchange their feelings with respect to social relationships (e.g. partners, groups, networks). Positive emotions produced by exchange will increase solidarity in these relationships, while negative emotions will decrease solidarity.

=== Theoretical propositions ===
Affect theory of social exchange shows how the conditions of exchanges promote interpersonal and group relationships through emotions and affective processes. The theoretical arguments center on the following five claims:

Emotions produced by exchange are involuntary, internal responses

Individuals experience emotions (general feelings of pleasantness or unpleasantness) depending on whether their exchange is successful. These emotions can be construed as a reward or punishment, and individuals can strive to repeat actions that reproduce positive emotions or avoid negative emotions.

Individuals attempt to understand what in a social exchange situation produces emotions

Individuals will use the exchange task to understand the source (partners, groups, or networks) of their emotions. Individuals are more likely to attribute their emotions to their exchange partners or groups when the task can only be completed with one or more partners, when the task requires interdependent (non-separable) contributions, and when there is a shared sense of responsibility for the success or failure of the exchange.

The mode of exchange determines the features of the exchange task and influences the attribution of the emotion produced

The mode of exchange (productive, negotiated, reciprocal, or generalized) provides a description of the exchange task. The task features are defined by the degree of interdependence (separability of tasks) and shared responsibility between partners to complete the task. These features influence the strength of the emotion felt. Productive exchanges are interdependent, and this high degree of non-separability generates the strongest emotions. Reciprocal exchanges are separable which reduces the perceptions of shared responsibility. The exchange produces little emotional response, but individuals instead express emotions in response to the asymmetrical transaction. Generalized exchanges do not occur directly, but interdependence is still high and coordination between partners is difficult. Because there is no direct emotional foundation, emotions produced are low. Negotiated exchanges may produce conflicting emotions due to the mixed-motive nature of negotiations; even when transactions are successful, individuals may feel like they had the ability to do better, creating emotional ambivalence. Overall, productive exchanges produce the strongest attributions of emotions, generalized (indirect) exchange the weakest, with negotiated and reciprocal exchanges in between.

The attribution of emotions resulting from different exchange modes impact the solidarity felt with partners or groups

The different types of exchange (productive, reciprocal, and generalized) also impact the solidarity or identification that an individual will feel with their exchange partners or group. The different exchange types help dictate the target of felt emotions and influences an individual's attachment. Affective attachment occurs when a social unit (partner or group) is the target of positive feelings from exchange; affective detachment (alienation) occurs when a social unit is the target of negative feelings from failure to exchange. Affective attachment increases solidarity. Similar to the attribution of emotion, productive exchange produces the strongest affective attachments, generalized exchange the weakest, and negotiated and reciprocal exchange are in between.

One condition for how social (partner or group) attributions can increase solidarity is by reducing self-serving attributions of credit or blame for the success or failure of the exchange. When individuals have group attributions for positive emotions stemming from success, this eliminates any self-serving biases and enhances both pride in the self and gratitude to the partner. However, group attributions for negative emotions stemming from failure do not eliminate self-serving biases, resulting in more anger toward the partner or group than shame in the self.

Lawler also proposes that the persistence (stability) and ability to control acts by the exchange partner (controllability) provide conditions for affective attachment by attributing credit or blame for the success or failure of the exchange. Following Weiner (1985) affect theory of social exchange extrapolates that the combinations of stability and uncontrollability elicit different emotions. In social exchange, social connections can be sources of stability and controllability. For example, if an exchange partner is perceived as a stable source of positive feelings, and the exchange partner has control in the acts that elicit those positive feelings, this will strengthen affective attachment. Therefore, affect theory of social exchange proposes that stable and controllable sources of positive feelings (i.e. pleasantness, pride, gratitude) will elicit affective attachments while stable and uncontrollable sources of negative feelings (i.e. unpleasantness, shame, anger) will elicit affective detachment.

Through these emotional processes, networks can develop group properties

Repeated exchanges allow a network to evolve into a group. Affect theory highlights the contributions of emotions in producing group properties. Successful interactions generate positive feelings for the involved individuals, which motivates them to interact with the same partners in the future. As exchanges repeat, the strong relationships become visible to other parties, making salient their role as a group and helping to generate a group identity that continues to bind the partners together in a network. Affect theory predicts that networks of negotiated and reciprocal exchange will tend to promote stronger relational ties within partners; productive or generalized exchange will promote stronger network or group-level ties.

== See also ==
- Complexity science
- Equity theory
- Evolutionary psychology
- Generalized exchange
- Institutional
- Interdependence
- Open innovation
- Predicted outcome value theory
- Rational agent
- Sexual economics
- Social action
- Social good
- Social interaction
- Social networks
- Value conversion
- Value (economics)
- Value network
- Value network analysis
- Vulnerability and care theory of love
