= Redistribution (cultural anthropology) =

System of economic exchange

In cultural anthropology and sociology, redistribution refers to a system of economic exchange involving the centralized collection of goods from members of a group followed by the redivision of those goods among those members. It is a form of reciprocity. Redistribution differs from simple reciprocity, which is a dyadic back-and-forth exchange between two parties. Redistribution, in contrast, consists of pooling, a system of reciprocities. It is a within group relationship, whereas reciprocity is a between relationship. Pooling establishes a centre, whereas reciprocity inevitably establishes two distinct parties with their own interests. While the most basic form of pooling is that of food within the family, it is also the basis for sustained community efforts under a political leader.

Sahlins argues that generalized reciprocity within families by elders may be a "starting mechanism" for more general hierarchy, by placing many in the giver's debt. This leads to the question, "when does reciprocity give way to redistribution." Sahlins argues that chiefly redistribution is not different in principle and nothing but a highly organized form of kinship-rank reciprocity. Others, such as French Marxist anthropologist Claude Meillassoux, used the development of ranked kin redistribution from generalized reciprocity as the basis for a lineage mode of production found in western African chiefdoms and kingdoms. An elaborate example of this in a non-market society is the potlatch, where large amounts of personal resources are ceremonially given away to others in the community according to social status, with the tacit expectation that other members of the community would themselves give away large amounts of their own property in the future.

Bähre argued that redistribution is a central mechanism in capitalist economies. In South Africa, many find themselves in a post-Fordist economy that is characterised by redistribution through the state (development aid, welfare), through markets (for example commercial insurance) and through religious institutions (neo-Pentecostal churches).

In modern mixed market economies, the central form of redistribution is facilitated through taxation by the state. Redistribution of property therefore occurs where properties are allocated back to individuals or groups within society either through the provision of public services or directly through welfare benefits.

== See also ==
- Classless society
- Equality of outcome
- Non-market economics
- Economic anthropology
