= Classless society =

Society in which no one is born into a social class

A classless society is a society in which no one is born into a social class like in a class society. Distinctions in wealth, income, education, culture, or social network might arise and would only be determined by individual experience and achievement in such a society. The concept often refers to a society that lacks social hierarchy.

== Classlessness ==
The term classlessness has been used to describe different social phenomena, including that of primitive communism.

In societies where classes have been abolished, it is usually the result of a voluntary decision by the membership to form such a society to abolish a pre-existing class structure in an existing society or to form a new one without any. This would include communes of the modern period such as various American utopian communities or the kibbutzim as well as revolutionary and political acts at the nation-state level such as the Paris Commune or the Russian Revolution. The abolition of social classes and the establishment of a classless society is the primary goal of anarchism, communism and libertarian socialism.

According to Ulrich Beck, classlessness is achieved with class struggle: "It is the collective success with class struggle which institutionalizes individualization and dissolves the culture of classes, even under conditions of radicalizing inequalities". Essentially, classlessness will exist when the inequalities and injustice outweighs societies’ idea of the need for social ranking and hierarchy.

While Rolf Becker and Andreas Hadjar argue that class identity has weakened, in that "class position no longer generates a deep sense of identity and belonging", others maintain that class continues to affect lives, such as how children's success in education correlates with their parents' wealth.

== See also ==
- Bourgeoisie
- Communist revolution
- Communist society
- Corporate power
- Equality of outcome
- False consciousness
- Middle class
- New class
- Proletariat
- Social equality
- Social organization
- Social status
- Socialism
- Stateless communism
- Working class

== Bibliography ==
- Beynon, Huw (2014). "A classless society?". In Beynon, Huw; Glavanis, Pandeli (eds.). Patterns of Social Inequality. Routledge. pp. 36–53. doi:10.4324/9781315841854-4. ISBN 9781315841854.
- Devine, Fiona, ed. (1997). Towards a classless society?. Routledge. doi:10.4324/9780203976838-17. ISBN 9780203976838.
- Kingston, Paul W. (2000). The Classless Society. Stanford University Press. ISBN 0804738041.
