= Degreeting =

Conversational procedure

In pragmatics, a degreeting refers to the conversational procedure by which two participants of a conversation agree to discontinue the conversation. It is so named because a degreeting concludes a conversation in a similar way that a greeting engages one, and is one of the six common "blocks" of a conversation.

The following conversation is an example of degreeting:

Andrew: "I'll see you later then."
Bethany: "Yeah ok, see ya!"
Andrew: "Bye."

== See also ==
- Adjacency pair
- Parting phrase
