= Adjacency pairs =

Example of conversational turn-taking in linguistics

In linguistics, an adjacency pair is an example of conversational turn-taking. An adjacency pair is composed of two utterances by two speakers, one after the other. The speaking of the first utterance (the first-pair part, or the first turn) provokes a responding utterance (the second-pair part, or the second turn). Adjacency pairs are a component of pragmatic variation in the study of linguistics, and are considered primarily to be evident in the "interactional" function of pragmatics. Adjacency pairs exist in every language and vary in context and content among each, based on the cultural values held by speakers of the respective language. Oftentimes, they are contributed by speakers in an unconscious way, as they are an intrinsic part of the language spoken at-hand and are therefore embedded in speakers' understanding and use of the language. Thus, adjacency pairs may present their challenges when a person begins learning a language not native to them, as the cultural context and significance behind the adjacency pairs may not be evident to a speaker outside of the primary culture associated with the language.

== Usage ==
Adjacency pairs are most commonly found in what Schegloff and Sacks described as a "single conversation," a unit of communication in which a single person speaks and a second person replies to the first speaker's utterance. While the turn-taking mechanism of single conversation uses silence to indicate that the next speaker's turn may begin, adjacency pairs are used to show that both speakers are finished with the conversation and that the ensuing silence does not require either of the speakers to take another turn.

The prevalent use of adjacency pairs in greetings and terminal exchanges demonstrate the adjacency pair's primary function of being an organizational unit of conversation. Without the signal and expected response of the two utterances, the silence of one speaker may be never filled by the second speaker, or filled incorrectly. Adjacency pairs also convey politeness and a willingness from one speaker to acknowledge the feelings of the second speaker. For example, in English the greeting "How are you?" is mostly commonly followed by "I'm doing well," thus creating an adjacency pair that demonstrates a polite interest from one speaker and a reciprocal acknowledgment of that interest from the other. Failure to reply politely to the greeting "How are you?" is usually a sign of bad manners or an unwillingness to converse, thus showing how an adjacency pair is necessary to establish a working rapport between two speakers.

=== Examples of pairs ===
Many actions in conversation are accomplished through established adjacency pairs, examples of which include:

- call/beckon → response

"Waiter!" → "Yes, sir"

- complaint → excuse/remedy

"It's awfully cold in here" → "Oh, sorry, I'll close the window"

- compliment → acceptance/refusal

"I really like your new haircut!!" → "Oh, thanks"

- degreeting → degreeting response

"See you!" → "Yeah, see you later!"

- inform → acknowledge

"Your phone is over there" → "I know"

- greeting → greeting response

"Hiya!" → "Oh, hi!"

- offer → acceptance/rejection

"Would you like to visit the museum with me this evening?" → "I'd love to!"

- question → answer

"What does this big red button do?" → "It causes two-thirds of the universe to implode"

- request → acceptance/rejection

"Is it OK if I borrow this book?" → "I'd rather you didn't, it's due back at the library tomorrow"

== Cultural significance ==
In some contexts, adjacency pairs may act as an indicator of varying demographic elements. For instance, restaurants are a setting notorious for the adjacency pair that presents a 'thank you', followed by some response eliciting acceptance of the gratitude displayed by the 'thank you'. A variety of responses to the statement 'thank you' have been recorded, and an English speaker's choice of response may imply details of his dialect and ultimately his place of origin. For instance, the employment of 'you're welcome' as the second half of this adjacency pair is most often indicative of an English speaker's residence within the United States. American English is the English dialect most highly associated with 'you're welcome' as a response to 'thank you', while other dialects of English (e.g. British and Irish English) may deem this phrase more formal than other options. The phrase 'my pleasure' is also most commonly associated with American English. British English speakers, in contrast, often omit a response to 'thanks' when it is presented to them.

Additionally, the "'thank you' followed by an acknowledgement of gratitude" adjacency pair may work as an indicator of socioeconomic status based on when/in what context an English speaker decides to propose a 'thank you' statement. Nine restaurants in Los Angeles – representative of three different socioeconomic backgrounds – were studied by scholar Larssyn Staley from the University of Zurich to create an understanding of this idea. The results indicated that the offer of gratitude displayed in the 'thank you' statement is evident most prominently in non-verbal acts of service (e.g. presenting the check after the meal or wiping the table between courses) particularly among customers dining at restaurants in the highest and mid-socioeconomic levels. However, no 'thank you' comment was offered for non-verbal service acts in the restaurant representing the lowest socioeconomic level. The category most susceptible to 'thank you' comments from customers in the restaurant with the lowest socioeconomic association was the a verbal, explicit offer of service (e.g. Is there anything more I can get for you?) and this same category received the second highest quantity of 'thank you' offers in both the highest and mid-socioeconomic settings.

== Three-part interchange ==
A three-part exchange occurs after the first speaker in a conversation adds an additional response to the former two utterances. The third part serves many conversational functions, including evaluation of the response, recognition of an acceptable response, and comprehension of the response. Additionally, the third part can initiate topic bounding, a technique used to end a conversational exchange. In face-to-face communication, the third utterance can also be expressed non-verbally. Conversational transcripts may leave out non-verbal third part responses, falsely indicating that a third part is missing from the conversation.

Much like adjacency pairs themselves, the various types of three-part interchanges may be associated most closely with specific social settings and contextual situations. The evaluative three-part interchange (example displayed below) is commonly found in education settings, particularly within elementary education. The use of the evaluative three-part interchange has proven itself useful in such a setting as it helps teachers to ascertain themselves as both educators and "evaluators", in that the interchange grants them the opportunity to ask their students questions to which they already know the answers. In doing so, the teacher has the capacity to offer evaluation of a response as he can determine whether or not an answer is acceptable based on his own understanding of what answer is "correct". Adversely, if a teacher were to ask a question for which he did not know the answer, he would lose the ability to contribute the third part of this interchange as it would not be appropriate for him to determine the quality of the answer, as he himself has no certainty in its validity. Thus, the evaluative three-part interchange is often indicative of a classroom setting where this educator and evaluator combination is frequently perpetuated.

=== Examples of three-part interchanges ===
- Evaluative
  1. "What is the capital of China?"
  2. "Beijing."
  3. "Good work."
- Recognition of acceptability
  1. "Where are you going?
  2. "To the store."
  3. "I'll come, too."
- Comprehension
  1. "Is he home yet?"
  2. "No."
  3. "Okay."
- Topic bounding
  1. "Can you look this over?"
  2. "I'm busy."
  3. "I'll ask you again later."

== See also ==
- Conversation analysis
- Pragmatics
- Speech act
