= Reciprocity (cultural anthropology) =

Exchange of goods or labour

In cultural anthropology, reciprocity is the non-market exchange of goods or labour ranging from direct barter (immediate exchange) to forms of gift exchange where a return is eventually expected (delayed exchange) as in the exchange of birthday gifts. It is thus distinct from the true gift, where no return is expected.

When the exchange is immediate, as in barter, it does not create a social relationship. When the exchange is delayed, it creates both a relationship as well as an obligation for a return (i.e. debt). Hence, some forms of reciprocity can establish a hierarchy if the debt is not repaid. The failure to make a return may end a relationship between equals. Reciprocal exchanges can also have a political effect through the creation of multiple obligations and the establishment of leadership, as in the gift exchanges (Moka) between Big Men in Melanesia. Some forms of reciprocity are thus closely related to redistribution, where goods and services are collected by a central figure for eventual distribution to followers.

Marshall Sahlins, an American cultural anthropologist, identified three main types of reciprocity (generalized, balanced and negative) in the book Stone Age Economics (1972). Reciprocity was also the general principle used by Claude Lévi-Strauss to explain the Elementary Structures of Kinship (1949), in one of the most influential works on kinship theory in the post-war period.

== The history of the "norm of reciprocity" in European economic thought ==
Annette Weiner argued that the "norm of reciprocity" is deeply implicated in the development of Western economic theory. Both John Locke and Adam Smith used the idea of reciprocity to justify a free market without state intervention. Reciprocity was used, on the one hand, to legitimize the idea of a self-regulating market; and to argue how individual vice was transformed into social good on the other. Western economic theorists starting with the eighteenth-century Scots economists Sir James Stuart and Smith differentiated pre-modern natural (or self-subsistent) economies from civilized economies marked by a division of labour that necessitated exchange. Like early sociologist Émile Durkheim, they viewed natural economies as characterized by mechanical solidarity (like so many peas in a pod) whereas the civilized division of labour made producers mutually dependent upon one another resulting in organic solidarity. These oppositions solidified by the late nineteenth century in the evolutionary idea of primitive communism marked by mechanical solidarity as the antithesis and alter ego of Western "Homo economicus". It is this armchair anthropology opposition that originally informed modern anthropological debate when Malinowski sought to overturn the opposition and argue that archaic societies are equally regulated by the norm of reciprocity and maximizing behaviour.

The concept was key to the debate between early anthropologists Bronislaw Malinowski and Marcel Mauss on the meaning of "Kula exchange" in the Trobriand Islands off Papua New Guinea during the First World War. Malinowski used Kula exchange to demonstrate that apparently random gift-giving was in fact a key political process by which non-state political leadership spanning a vast archipelago was established. Gift-giving, he argued, was not altruistic (as it supposedly is in our society) but politically motivated for individual gain. Marcel Mauss theorized the impetus for a return as "the spirit of the gift," an idea that has provoked a long debate in economic anthropology on what motivated the reciprocal exchange. Claude Lévi-Strauss, drawing on Mauss, argued there were three spheres of exchange governed by reciprocity: language (exchange of words), kinship (exchange of women), and economics (exchange of things). He thus claimed all human relationships are based on the norm of reciprocity. This claim has been disputed by anthropologists Jonathan Parry, Annette Weiner, and David Graeber amongst others.

== Basic types ==
=== The domestic mode of production ===
Marshall Sahlins has emphasized that non-market exchange is constrained by social relationships. That is, exchange in non-market societies is less about acquiring the means of production (whether land or tools) and more about the redistribution of finished goods throughout a community. These social relationships are largely kinship-based. His discussion of types of reciprocity is located within what he calls the "domestic mode of production." His typology of reciprocity thus refers to "cultures lacking a political state, and it applies only insofar as the economy and social relations have not been modified by the historic penetration of states." Paul Sillitoe has extended the analysis of reciprocity in these conditions, arguing that the type of reciprocity found will depend upon which sphere of production is being examined. The production of subsistence goods is under the control of domestic units and hence is marked by generalized reciprocity (or generalized exchange). Wealth objects – by their nature from outside – are competitively exchanged to acquire status, but no one is able to control their production and hence centralize power.

==== Sahlins' typology ====
In these circumstances, the reciprocal exchange can be divided into two types: dyadic back-and-forth exchange (reciprocity), and pooling (redistribution). Pooling is a system of reciprocities. It is a within-group relationship, whereas reciprocity is a between relationship. Pooling establishes a centre, whereas reciprocity inevitably establishes two distinct parties with their own interests. While the most basic form of pooling is that of food within the family, it is also the basis for sustained community efforts under a political leader.

Reciprocity, in contrast, is a dyadic exchange covering a range of possibilities, depending on individual interests. These interests will vary according to the social distance of the parties. A range of kinds of reciprocity can thus be sketched out, according to Sahlins:

- Generalized reciprocity (see also generalized exchange) refers to putatively altruistic transactions, the "true gift" marked by "weak reciprocity" due to the vagueness of the obligation to reciprocate. The material side of the transaction (the exchange of equally valuable goods) is repressed by the social side and the reckoning of debts is avoided. The time for the return gift is indefinite and not qualified in quantity or quality. A failure to reciprocate does not result in the giver ceasing to give.
- Balanced or Symmetrical reciprocity refers to the direct exchange of customary equivalents without any delay, and hence includes some forms of 'gift-exchange,' as well as purchases with 'primitive money.' The exchange is less social, and is dominated by the material exchange and individual interests.
- Negative reciprocity is the attempt to get "something for nothing with impunity." It may be described as 'haggling,' 'barter,' or 'theft.' It is the most impersonal form of exchange, with interested parties seeking to maximize their gains.

==== Reciprocity and kinship distance ====
This typology of reciprocal exchange was developed by Sahlins in relation to the domestic mode of production (i.e. 'Stone Age economics') and hence should be contrasted with the 19th-century armchair conceptions of 'primitive communism.' Within this same domestic mode of production, the degree of social distance – kinship in particular – affects the kind of reciprocity. Since kinship is the major way in which these societies are organized, nonkin (strangers) are viewed negatively. A general model of reciprocity must recognize that the closeness of the kin tie will vary according to the type of kinship system. In so far as kinship also determines residence, kinship closeness may also translate into spatial closeness. Hence one finds generalized reciprocity within the household-kinship group, balanced reciprocity within a spatial community, and negative reciprocity with outsiders (i.e. outside the community). This kind of reciprocity reflects the moral nature of the social relationship, hence morality is not universal, but dependent on social distance. Sahlins' model thus views reciprocity as socially, morally and economically structured and "the structure is that of kinship-tribal groups" not a universalizing moral ethic.

==== Reciprocity and kinship rank ====
With rank come privileges. However, in traditional societies "social inequality is more the organization of economic equality. Often, in fact, high rank is only secured or sustained by overcrowing generosity." Rank is usually generational, with elders having seniority, but still held by the bounds of close kinship. Generalized reciprocity by such elders may be a "starting mechanism" for more general hierarchy, by placing many in the giver's debt. This leads to the question, "when does reciprocity give way to redistribution." Sahlins argues that chiefly redistribution is not different in principle and nothing but a highly organized form of kinship-rank reciprocity.

=== Reciprocity in market-based societies ===
David Graeber argues, in contrast, that balanced gift exchange and market exchange have more in common than normally assumed. Since both are balanced, the social relationship created through the sense of debt and obligation is constantly in danger of being ended by the return gift/exchange. He thinks it better to contrast "open" and "closed" reciprocity. Open reciprocity "keeps no accounts because it implies a relation of permanent mutual commitment." This open reciprocity is closed off precisely when it is balanced. Through this method, we can see the relationship as a matter of degree, more or less open or closed. Closed reciprocity of gifts is most like market exchange. It is competitive, individualistic and may border on barter.

== Reciprocity and marital alliance ==
The alliance theory (or general theory of exchanges) is the name given to the structural method of studying kinship relations. It finds its origins in Claude Lévi-Strauss's Elementary Structures of Kinship (1949). According to Levi-Strauss, the universal prohibition of incest pushes human groups towards exogamy where certain categories of kin are forbidden to marry. The incest taboo is thus a negative prescription; without it, nothing would push men to go searching for women outside of their inner kinship circle, or vice versa. The idea of the alliance theory is thus of a reciprocal or a generalized exchange which founds affinity, just as economic exchange due to the division of labour resulted in organic solidarity. This global phenomenon takes the form of a "circulation of spouses" which links together the various social groups in one whole: society. Lévi-Strauss emphasizes this as a system of generalized exchange based on indirect reciprocity. A generalized system does not involve a direct or balanced dyadic exchange and hence presupposes an expansion of trust.

== Reciprocity in the aspect of Cultural Anthropology ==
In Cultural Anthropology, Reciprocity can be characterized as an exchange with the expectation to receive. The individuals who give and individuals who receive are connected to each other in durable relationships, and thus expectations are generated. Power dynamics are distributed amongst individuals of varying hierarchical degrees to convey the significance of the gifts exchanged. There is an importance placed on the value of gifts given to those of greater hierarchical statuses, and formalities are taken into account.

Contrary to the generalizing assumption of reciprocity (where a return is expected), altruistic behavior(prosocial) occurs when there is no expectation of a return. Altruistic behavior is shaped by internal processes and situations that enable individuals to make decisions in a prosocial manner. Altruism may also be employed to manipulate situations, presenting deceptive behaviors where the giver's true intention is self-interest and hidden motives.

Reciprocity emerges as a significant subject considering both kinship ties and broader societal interactions, exploring the various approaches to reciprocating acts of kindness.

== See also ==
- Generalized exchange
- Gift economy
- Economic anthropology
- Iroquois economics – an example of symmetrical reciprocity
- Mutualism (economic theory)
- Kinship system
- Bronisław Malinowski
- Reciprocity (social psychology)
- Social preferences
