= List of stalk-eyed flies =

Stalk-eyed flies (family Diopsidae) comprises around 150 species.

== Species list ==
- Genus Centrioncus
  - Centrioncus aberrans
  - Centrioncus angusticercus
  - Centrioncus bytebieri
  - Centrioncus decellei
  - Centrioncus decoronotus
  - Centrioncus jacobae
  - Centrioncus prodiopsis
- Genus Cladodiopsis
  - Cladodiopsis leptophylla
  - Cladodiopsis seyrigi
  - Cladodiopsis sicardi
- Genus Cyrtodiopsis
  - Cyrtodiopsis concava
  - Cyrtodiopsis plauta
- Genus Diasemopsis
  - Diasemopsis aethiopica
  - Diasemopsis albifacies
  - Diasemopsis amora
  - Diasemopsis apicifasciata
  - Diasemopsis comoroensis
  - Diasemopsis concolor
  - Diasemopsis coniortodes
  - Diasemopsis conjuncta
  - Diasemopsis dejecta
  - Diasemopsis disconcerta
  - Diasemopsis dubia
  - Diasemopsis elegantula
  - Diasemopsis elongata
  - Diasemopsis exquisita
  - Diasemopsis fasciata
  - Diasemopsis fusca
  - Diasemopsis fuscapicis
  - Diasemopsis fuscivenis
  - Diasemopsis hirsuta
  - Diasemopsis hirta
  - Diasemopsis horni
  - Diasemopsis incerta
  - Diasemopsis interrupta
  - Diasemopsis jeanneli
  - Diasemopsis jillyi
  - Diasemopsis latifascia
  - Diasemopsis longipedunculata
  - Diasemopsis meigenii
  - Diasemopsis minuta
  - Diasemopsis munroi
  - Diasemopsis nebulosa
  - Diasemopsis obscura
  - Diasemopsis obstans
  - Diasemopsis pleuritica
  - Diasemopsis pulchella
  - Diasemopsis quadrata
  - Diasemopsis robusta
  - Diasemopsis sexnotata
  - Diasemopsis siderata
  - Diasemopsis signata
  - Diasemopsis silvatica
  - Diasemopsis subfuscata
  - Diasemopsis thaxteri
  - Diasemopsis thomyris
  - Diasemopsis wolteri
- Genus Diopsina
  - Diopsina draconigena
  - Diopsina ferruginea
  - Diopsina intermedia
  - Diopsina kwaipai
  - Diopsina nitida
  - Diopsina schulteni
- Genus Diopsis
  - Diopsis abdominalis
  - Diopsis absens
  - Diopsis acanthophthalma
  - Diopsis angustifemur
  - Diopsis anthracina
  - Diopsis apicalis
  - Diopsis arabica
  - Diopsis aries
  - Diopsis atricapilla
  - Diopsis atromicans
  - Diopsis baigumensis
  - Diopsis basalis
  - Diopsis circularis
  - Diopsis collaris
  - Diopsis confusa
  - Diopsis cruciata
  - Diopsis curva
  - Diopsis dimidiata
  - Diopsis diversipes
  - Diopsis eisentrauti
  - Diopsis erythrocephala
  - Diopsis finitima
  - Diopsis flavoscutellaris
  - Diopsis fumipennis
  - Diopsis furcata
  - Diopsis globosa
  - Diopsis gnu
  - Diopsis hoplophora
  - Diopsis ichneumonea
  - Diopsis indica
  - Diopsis leucochira
  - Diopsis lindneri
  - Diopsis macquartii
  - Diopsis macromacula
  - Diopsis macrophthalma
  - Diopsis maculithorax
  - Diopsis melania
  - Diopsis micronotata
  - Diopsis munroi
  - Diopsis neesii
  - Diopsis nigra
  - Diopsis nigrasplendens
  - Diopsis nigriceps
  - Diopsis nigrosicus
  - Diopsis nitela
  - Diopsis orizae
  - Diopsis ornata
  - Diopsis phlogodes
  - Diopsis planidorsum
  - Diopsis pollinosa
  - Diopsis preapicalis
  - Diopsis punctigera
  - Diopsis rubriceps
  - Diopsis servillei
  - Diopsis somaliensis
  - Diopsis stuckenbergi
  - Diopsis subfasciata
  - Diopsis sulcifrons
  - Diopsis surcoufi
  - Diopsis terminata
  - Diopsis trentepohlii
  - Diopsis wiedemanni
- Genus Eosiopsis
  - Eosiopsis orientalis
  - Eosiopsis pumila
  - Eosiopsis sinensis
- Genus Eurydiopsis
  - Eurydiopsis brevispinus
  - Eurydiopsis glabrostylus
  - Eurydiopsis helsdingeni
  - Eurydiopsis pachya
  - Eurydiopsis porphyria
  - Eurydiopsis pseudohelsdingeni
  - Eurydiopsis sarawakensis
  - Eurydiopsis subnotata
- Genus Pseudodiopsis
  - Pseudodiopsis bipunctipennis
  - Pseudodiopsis detrahens
- Genus Sphyracephala
  - Sphyracephala beccarii
  - Sphyracephala brevicornis
  - Sphyracephala europaea
  - Sphyracephala hearseiana
  - Sphyracephala munroi
  - Sphyracephala subbifasciata
- Genus Teleopsis
  - Teleopsis adjacens
  - Teleopsis africana
  - Teleopsis anjahanaribei
  - Teleopsis apographica
  - Teleopsis apollo
  - Teleopsis boettcheri
  - Teleopsis currani
  - Teleopsis dalmanni
  - Teleopsis discrepans
  - Teleopsis fallax
  - Teleopsis ferruginea
  - Teleopsis fulviventris
  - Teleopsis krombeini
  - Teleopsis maculata
  - Teleopsis motatrix
  - Teleopsis onopyxus
  - Teleopsis orientalis
  - Teleopsis pharao
  - Teleopsis quadriguttata
  - Teleopsis quinqueguttata
  - Teleopsis rubicunda
  - Teleopsis selecta
  - Teleopsis sexguttata
  - Teleopsis shillitoi
  - Teleopsis sinensis
  - Teleopsis sykesii
  - Teleopsis thaii
  - Teleopsis trichophoras
  - Teleopsis vadoni
  - Teleopsis whitei
- Genus Teloglabrus
  - Teloglabrus australis
  - Teloglabrus curvipes
  - Teloglabrus duplospinosus
  - Teloglabrus entabensis
  - Teloglabrus lebombensis
  - Teloglabrus londti
  - Teloglabrus milleri
  - Teloglabrus pelecyformis
  - Teloglabrus prolongatus
  - Teloglabrus sabiensis
  - Teloglabrus sanorum
  - Teloglabrus stuckenbergi
  - Teloglabrus trituberculatus
  - Teloglabrus tsitsikamensis
  - Teloglabrus vumbensis
