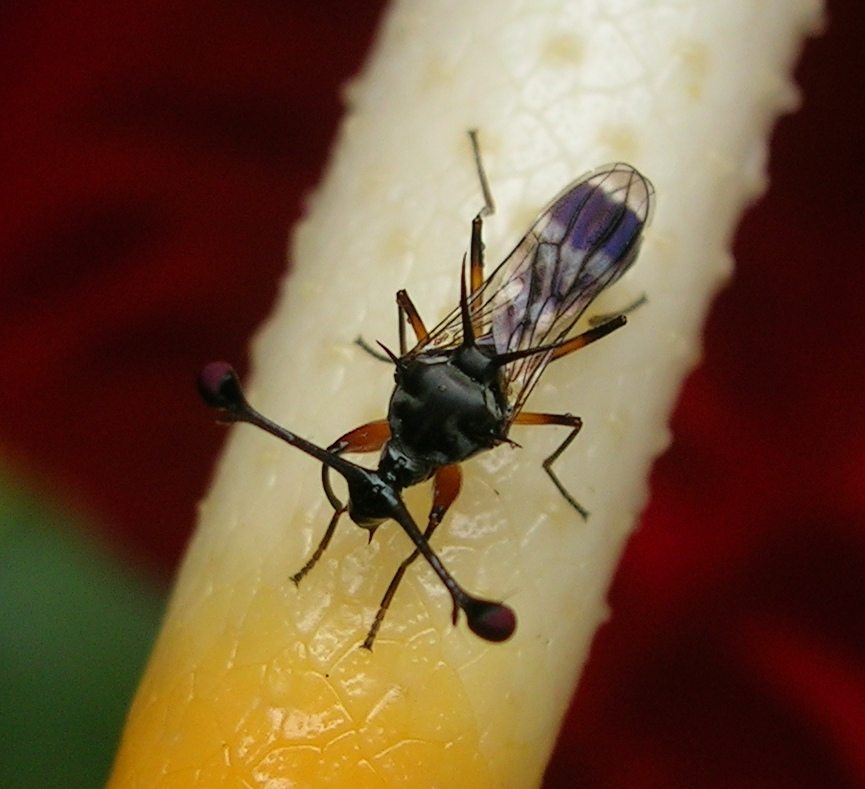
- Note the clear tip to wing

Scientific classification
- Kingdom: Animalia
- Phylum: Arthropoda
- Class: Insecta
- Order: Diptera
- Family: Diopsidae
- Genus: Teleopsis
- Species: T. amnoni

Binomial name
- Teleopsis amnoni Feijen & Feijen, 2019

= Teleopsis amnoni =

Species of fly

Teleopsis amnoni is a species of stalk-eyed fly found in the Western Ghats of India. The species was described by Feijen & Feijen in 2019 and said to be closely related to Teleopsis sykesii from which it can be distinguished by the clear tip to the wing apart from other characters. The species is known from India, in the states of Karnataka, Kerala and Maharashtra.
