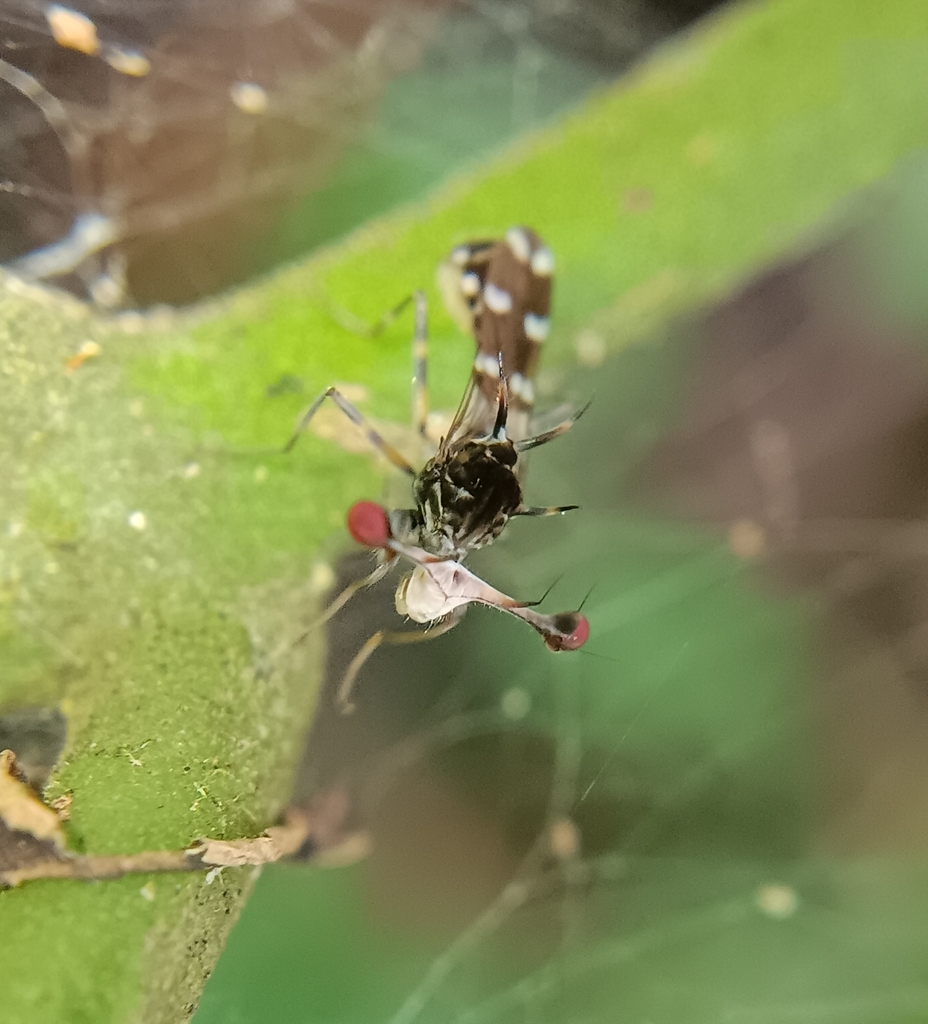
- Teleopsis selecta on a stem

Scientific classification
- Kingdom: Animalia
- Phylum: Arthropoda
- Class: Insecta
- Order: Diptera
- Family: Diopsidae
- Genus: Teleopsis
- Species: T. selecta

Binomial name
- Teleopsis selecta Osten Sacken, 1882

= Teleopsis selecta =

Species of fly

Teleopsis selecta is a species of fly in the genus Teleopsis occurring exclusively in the Philippines.

== Appearance ==
This species looks like a midge of the genus Chasmatonotus with its classic black and white spotted wings, but differs by having a big brown hump on its head, and having its eyes go out like antlers. its mouth looks like that of a leafhoppers.
