= Colt (horse) =

Male horse usually below 4 years old

A colt is a young male horse, usually below the age of four years.

== Description ==
The term "colt" only describes young male horses and is not to be confused with foal, which is a horse of either sex less than one year of age. Similarly, a yearling is a horse of either sex between the ages of one and two. A young female horse is called a filly, and a mare once she is an adult animal. In horse racing, particularly for Thoroughbreds in the United Kingdom, a colt is defined as an uncastrated male from the age of two up to and including the age of four.

The term is derived from Proto-Germanic *kultaz ("lump, bundle, offspring") and is etymologically related to "child."

An adult male horse, if left intact, is called either a "stallion" if used for breeding, or a horse (sometimes full horse); if castrated, it is called a gelding. In some cases, particularly informal nomenclature, a gelding under four years is still called a colt. A rig or ridgling is a male equine with a retained testicle or one which has been incompletely castrated.

In the wild, colts are driven from their herds by the herd stallion somewhere between the age of one and two. This may be, in part, an instinct to prevent inbreeding. When driven out, they usually join with other young stallions in a bachelor herd. They stay with this band until they are mature enough to form their own herd of mares. The terms "rag" or "rake" have been historically used to refer to a group of colts, but they have fallen out of modern usage.

Colts of different ages

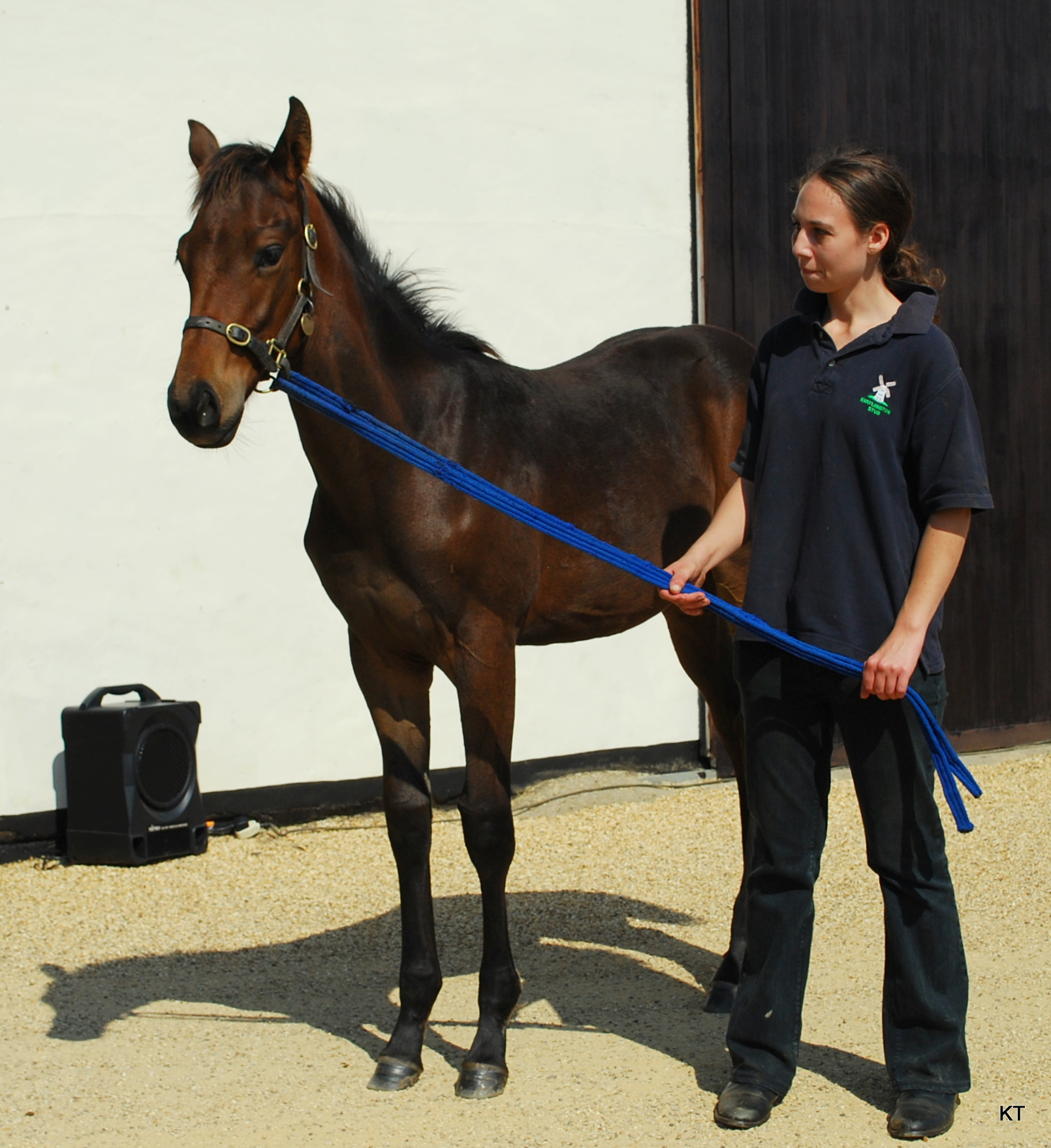
A weanling colt

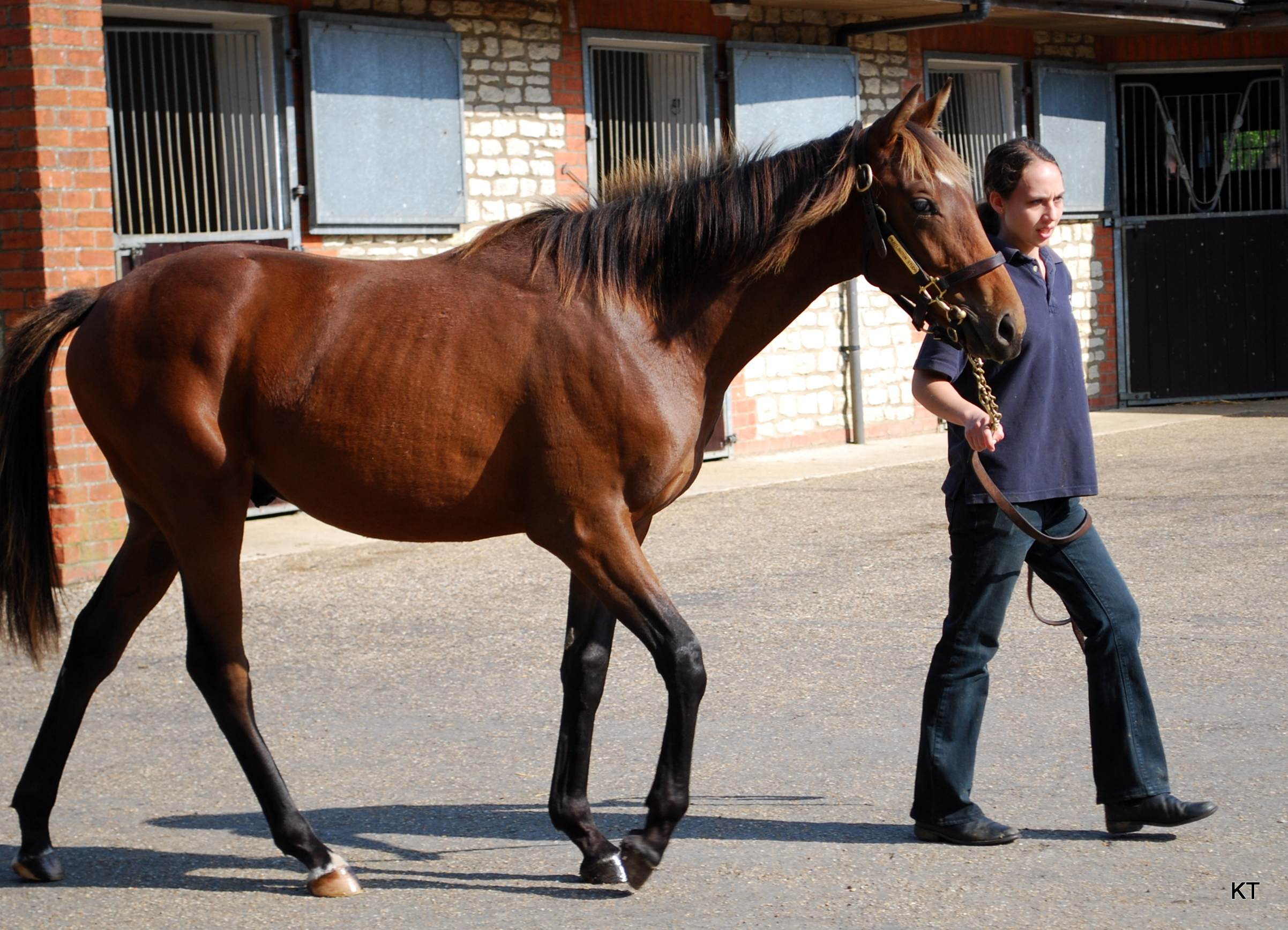
A yearling colt

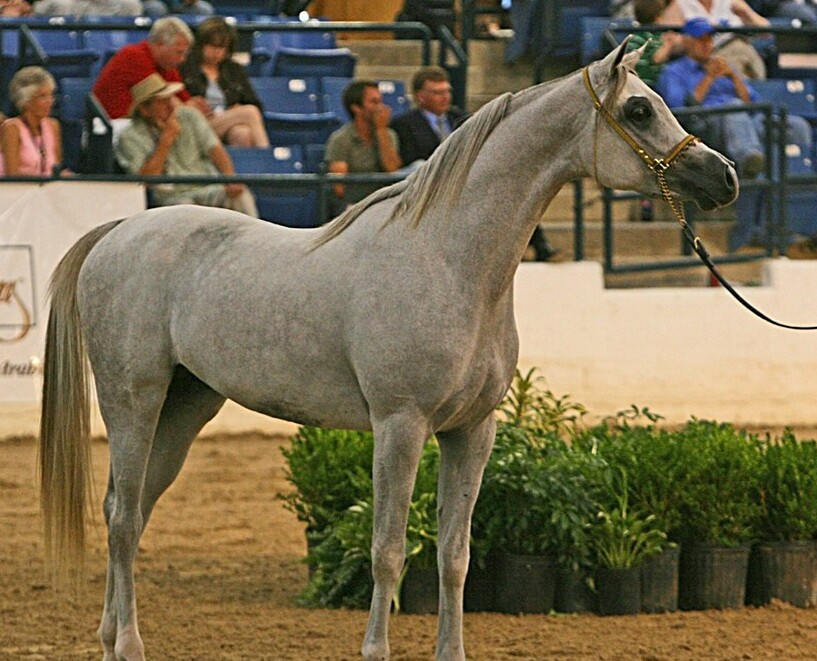
A two-year-old colt

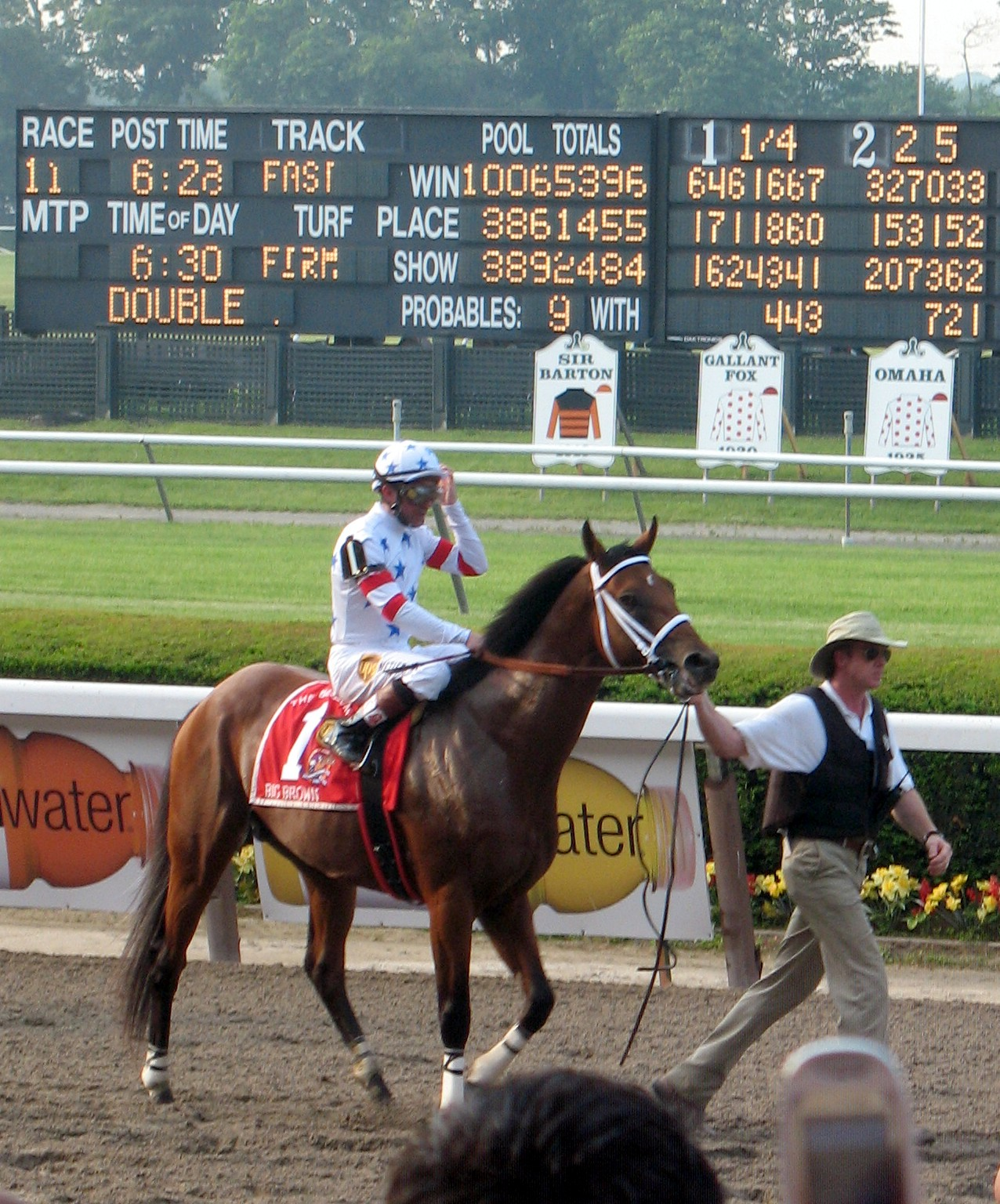
A three-year-old colt (Big Brown)
