= Harem (zoology) =

Animal group consisting of one or two males, a number of females and their offspring

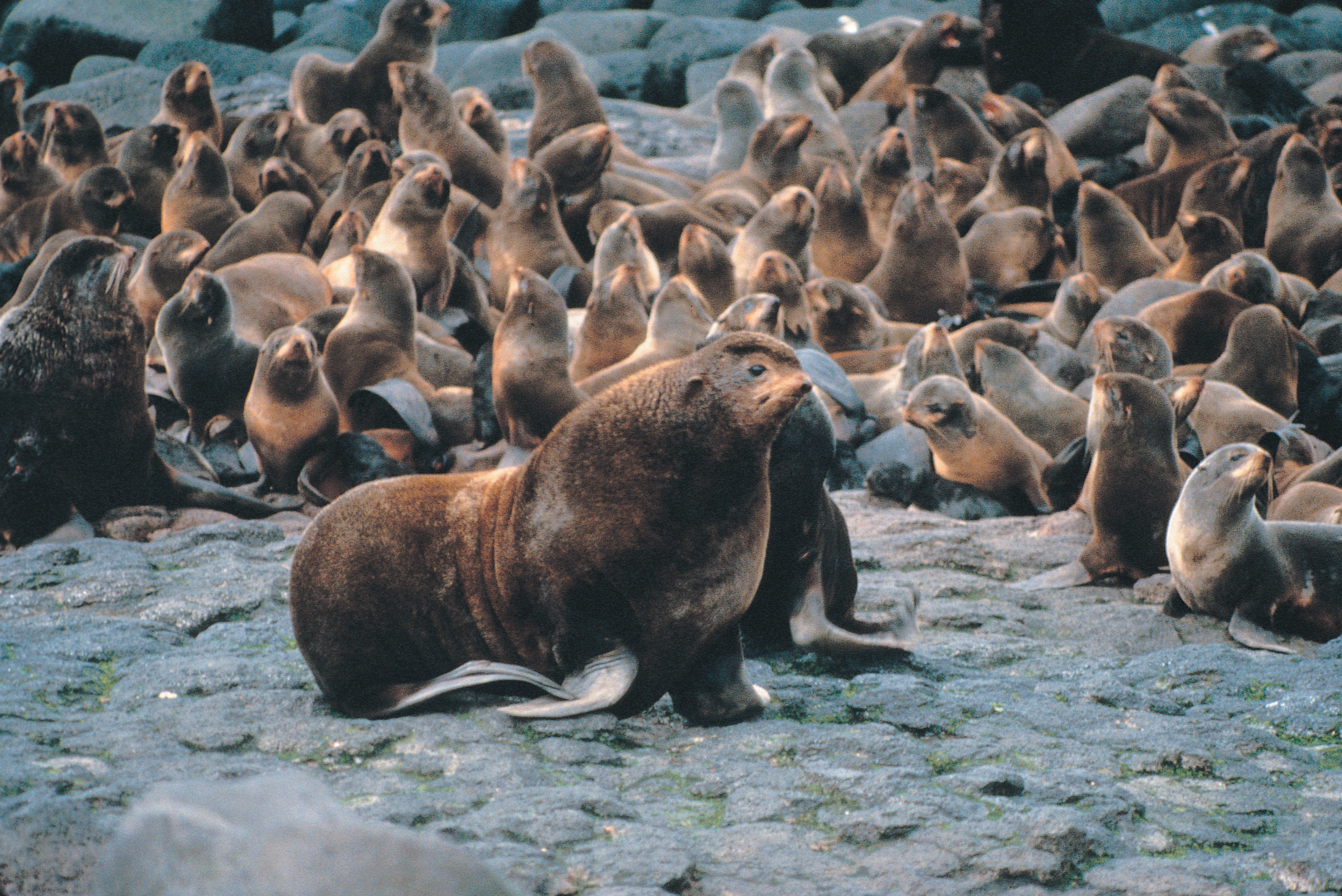
Large male northern fur seal and harem of smaller females

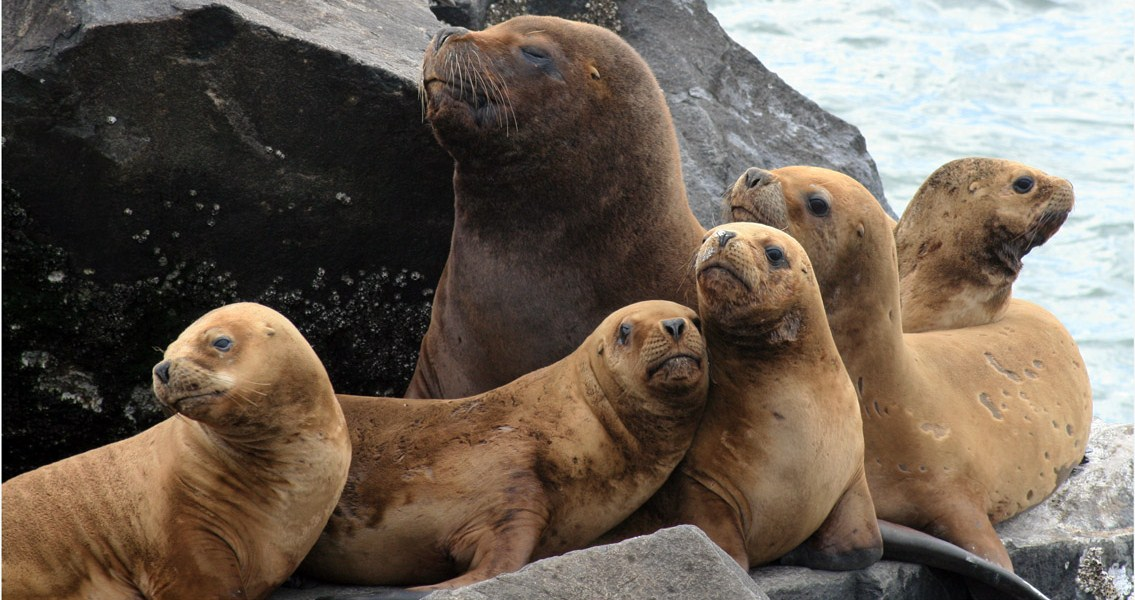
Largest male South American sea lion and harem of smaller females

A harem is an animal group consisting of one or two males, a number of females, and their offspring. The dominant male drives off other males and maintains the unity of the group. If present, the second male is subservient to the dominant male. As juvenile males grow, they leave the group and roam as solitary individuals or join bachelor herds. Females in the group may be inter-related. The dominant male mates with the females as they become sexually active and drives off competitors, until he is displaced by another male. In some species, incoming males that achieve dominant status may commit infanticide.

For the male, the primary benefit of the harem system is obtaining exclusive access to a group of mature females. The females benefit from being in a stable social group and the associated benefits of grooming, predator avoidance and cooperative defense of territory. The disadvantages for the male are the energetic costs of gaining or defending a harem which may leave him with reduced reproductive success. The females are disadvantaged if their offspring are killed during dominance battles or by incoming males.

== Overview ==
The term harem is used in zoology to distinguish social organization consisting of a group of females, their offspring, and one to two males.

The single male, called the dominant male, may be accompanied by another young male, called a "follower" male. Females that closely associate with the dominant male are called "central females," while females who associate less frequently with the dominant male are called "peripheral females." Juvenile male offspring leave the harem and live either solitarily, or, with other young males in groups known as bachelor herds. Sexually mature female offspring may stay within their natal harem, or may join another harem. The females in a harem may be, but are not exclusively, genetically related.

For instance, the females in hamadryas baboon harems are not usually genetically related because their harems are formed by "kidnapping" females from other harems and subsequent herding. In contrast, gelada harems are based on kinship ties to genetically related females. Multiple harems may assemble into larger groups known as "clans" or "teams".

Harem cohesiveness is mediated by the dominant male who fights off invading males to keep claim over the harem. In some harem-forming species, when a dominant male vacates his harem (due to death, defection to another harem, or usurpation) the incoming male sometimes commits infanticide of the offspring. Because time and resources are no longer being devoted to the offspring, infanticide often stimulates the female to return to sexual receptivity and fertility sooner than if the offspring were to survive. Furthermore, while lactating, females do not ovulate and consequently are not fertile. Infanticide therefore has the potential to increase the incoming male's reproductive success.

== Benefits ==
Harems are a beneficial social structure for the dominant male, as it allows him access to several reproductively available females at a time. Harems provide protection for the females within a particular harem, as dominant males will fiercely ward off potential invaders. This level of protection may also, such in the case of the common pheasant, reduce the energy expended by females on remaining alert to, or fleeing from, invading males. Harems allow bonding and socialization among the female members, which can result in greater control over access to females as determined by the females' preferences. Harems also facilitate socialized behavior such as grooming and cooperative defense of territory.

== Costs ==
Harems can prove energetically costly for both males and females. Males spend substantial amounts of energy engaging in battles to invade a harem, or to keep hold of a harem once dominance has been established. Such energy expenditure can result in reduced reproductive success such as in the case of red deer. This is especially true when there is a high turnover rate of dominant males because frequent intense fighting can result in great energy expenditure. High turnover rate of dominant males can also be energetically costly for the females as their offspring are frequently killed in harems where infanticide occurs. Harems can also negatively affect females if there is intra-harem competition among females for resources.

A lower-cost alternative mating strategy, useful to bachelors without a harem, is what zoologists call "sneaking". In this strategy, a male sneaks in to mate while the harem owner is distracted: in the case of red deer, when the harem stag is involved in a fight with another older stag. The strategy is also recorded in other species such as the elephant seal.

== Examples ==
Animals that form harems include:

=== Mammals ===
- Red deer
- Elephant seal
- Greater short-nosed fruit bat
- Jamaican fruit bat

==== Primates ====
- Hamadryas baboon
- Gelada baboon
- Golden snub-nosed monkey
- Guinea baboon
- Gray langurs
- Gorillas

=== Birds ===
- Boat-tailed grackle
- Common pheasant
- Greater rhea

=== Insects ===
- Bark beetle
- Tree wētā
- Malaysian stalk-eyed fly forms temporary harems even though mating frequency is high with multiple mating partners.

=== Fish ===
- Hogfish
- Several species of cichlid
- California sheephead
