= Megalabops bigotii =

Scientific classification
- Kingdom: Animalia
- Phylum: Arthropoda
- Clade: Pancrustacea
- Class: Insecta
- Order: Diptera
- Family: Diopsidae
- Genus: Megalabops
- Species: M. bigotii

Binomial name
- Megalabops bigotii Hendel, 1914

Species of fly

Megalabops bigotii is a species of stalk-eyed flies found in Taiwan. It was formerly known as Teleopsis bigotii, and was erroneously thought to be a synonym of Megalabops quadriguttata.
