= Sphyracephala subbifasciata =

Scientific classification
- Domain: Eukaryota
- Kingdom: Animalia
- Phylum: Arthropoda
- Class: Insecta
- Order: Diptera
- Family: Diopsidae
- Genus: Sphyracephala
- Species: S. subbifasciata

Binomial name
- Sphyracephala subbifasciata Fitch, 1855

Species of fly

Sphyracephala subbifasciata is a species of stalk-eyed flies, insects in the family Diopsidae.
