= Megalabops =

- Megalabops quadriguttata

Scientific classification
- Kingdom: Animalia
- Phylum: Arthropoda
- Clade: Pancrustacea
- Class: Insecta
- Order: Diptera
- Family: Diopsidae
- Subfamily: Diopsinae
- Genus: Megalabops; Frey, 1928

Type species
- Megalabops quadriguttata

Genus of flies

Megalabops is a genus of stalk-eyed flies.

== Description ==
Flies of the genus Megalobops are distinguished by the inner orbital bristle in the middle of their eye-stalks being set upon a small tooth and their short supra-alar spines.

== Taxonomy ==
Megalabops contains the following species:

- Megalabops dharaensis
- Megalabops cheni
- Megalabops hainanensis
- Megalabops yunnana
- Megalabops quadriguttata
- Megalabops bigotii
