= Centrioncinae =

Scientific classification
- Kingdom: Animalia
- Phylum: Arthropoda
- Clade: Pancrustacea
- Class: Insecta
- Order: Diptera
- Family: Diopsidae
- Subfamily: Centrioncinae; Feijen, 1983

Subfamily of flies

Centrioncinae is a subfamily of stalk-eyed flies in the family Diopsidae.

== Species ==
- Genus Centrioncus Speiser, 1910
  - C. aberrans Feijen, 1983
  - C. angusticercus Feijen, 1983
  - C. bytebieri De Meyer, 2004
  - C. decellei Feijen, 1983
  - C. decoronotus Feijen, 1983
  - C. jacobae Feijen, 1983
  - C. prodiopsis Speiser, 1910
- GenusTeloglabrus Feijen, 1983
  - T. australis Feijen, 1983
  - T. curvipes Feijen, 1983
  - T. duplospinosus Feijen, 1983
  - T. entabensis Feijen, 1983
  - T. lebombensis Feijen, 1983
  - T. londti Feijen, 1983
  - T. milleri Feijen, 1983
  - T. pelecyformis Feijen, 1983
  - T. prolongatus Feijen, 1983
  - T. sabiensis Feijen, 1983
  - T. sanorum Feijen, 1983
  - T. stuckenbergi Feijen, 1983
  - T. trituberculatus Feijen, 1983
  - T. tsitsikamensis Feijen, 1983
  - T. vumbensis Feijen, 1983
