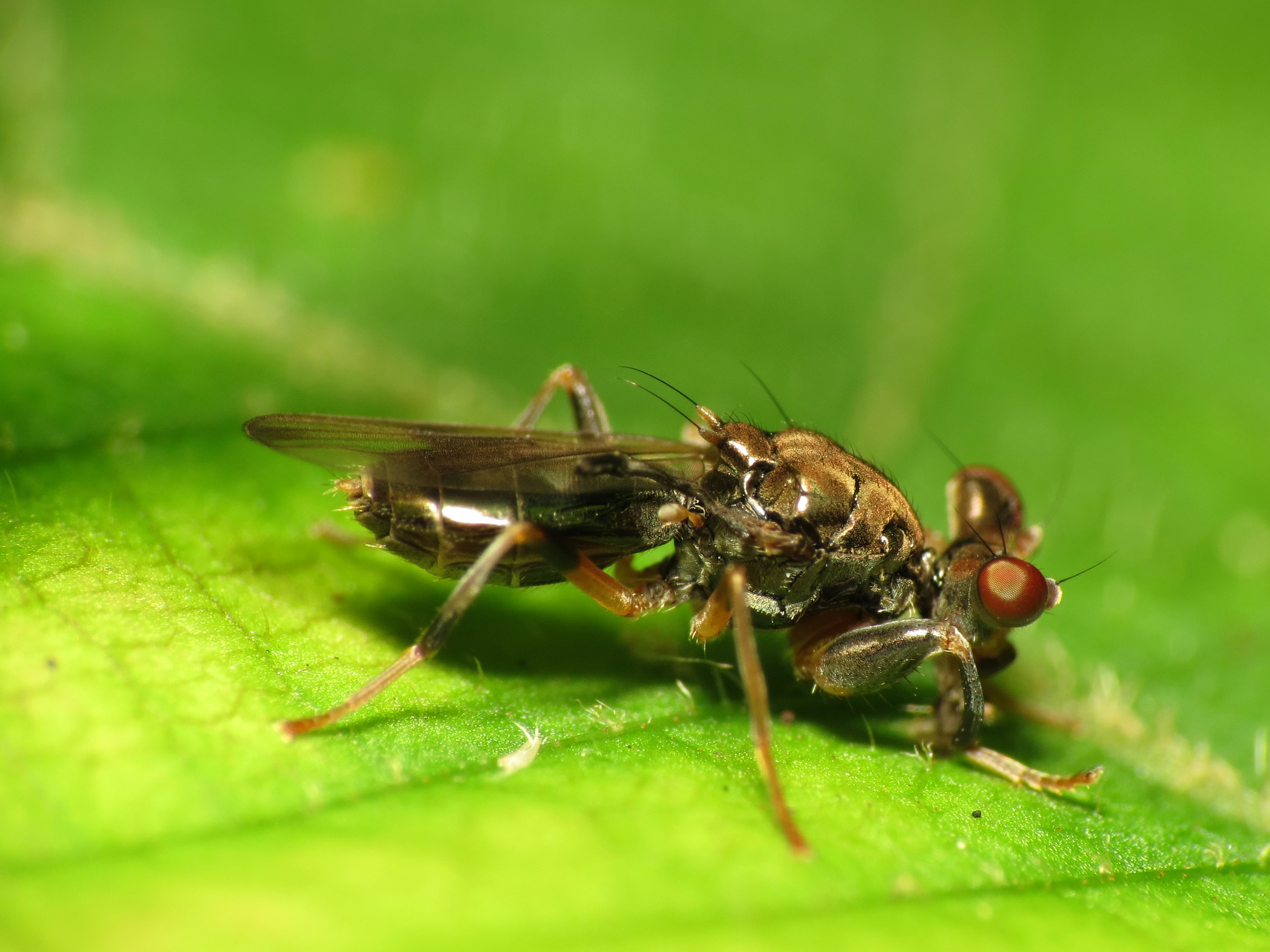

Scientific classification
- Domain: Eukaryota
- Kingdom: Animalia
- Phylum: Arthropoda
- Class: Insecta
- Order: Diptera
- Family: Diopsidae
- Genus: Sphyracephala
- Species: S. brevicornis

Binomial name
- Sphyracephala brevicornis (Say, 1817)

Synonyms
- Diopsis brevicornis Say, 1817

= Sphyracephala brevicornis =

Species of fly

Sphyracephala brevicornis is a species in the family Diopsidae ("stalk-eyed flies"), in the order Diptera ("flies"). A common name for Sphyracephala brevicornis is "short-horned ankle-headed fly".
