= Chasmatonotus atripes =

Scientific classification
- Domain: Eukaryota
- Kingdom: Animalia
- Phylum: Arthropoda
- Class: Insecta
- Order: Diptera
- Family: Chironomidae
- Genus: Chasmatonotus
- Species: C. atripes

Binomial name
- Chasmatonotus atripes Rempel, 1937

Species of fly

Chasmatonotus atripes is a species of midge in the family Chironomidae.
