= Chasmatonotus bicolor =

Scientific classification
- Domain: Eukaryota
- Kingdom: Animalia
- Phylum: Arthropoda
- Class: Insecta
- Order: Diptera
- Family: Chironomidae
- Genus: Chasmatonotus
- Species: C. bicolor

Binomial name
- Chasmatonotus bicolor Rempel, 1937

Species of fly

Chasmatonotus bicolor is a species of midge in the family Chironomidae.
