= Chasmatonotus unimaculatus =

Scientific classification
- Domain: Eukaryota
- Kingdom: Animalia
- Phylum: Arthropoda
- Class: Insecta
- Order: Diptera
- Family: Chironomidae
- Genus: Chasmatonotus
- Species: C. unimaculatus

Binomial name
- Chasmatonotus unimaculatus Loew, 1864

Species of fly

Chasmatonotus unimaculatus is a species of midge in the family Chironomidae.
