= Prosphyracephala =

Prosphyracephala Temporal range: Eocene, 44 Ma (Possible Oligocene record)

Scientific classification
- Kingdom: Animalia
- Phylum: Arthropoda
- Clade: Pancrustacea
- Class: Insecta
- Order: Diptera
- Family: Diopsidae
- Genus: †Prosphyracephala; Hennig, 1965

Type species
- Sphyracephala succini Loew, 1873

Other species
- Prosphyracephala rubiensis Lewis, 1971; Prosphyracephala kerneggeri Kotrba, 2009

Synonyms
- P. succini: ?Sphyracephala breviata Meunier, 1903

Genus of flies

Prosphyracephala is a genus of flies in the family Diopsidae. The genus is presumed to be extinct, and is known from specimens in Baltic amber. Among extant taxa, Prosphyracephala most closely resembles the genus Sphyracephala. It was originally described as a species of the latter genus, but was recognized as distinct by Willi Hennig in 1965.
