= Cyrtodiopsis =

Scientific classification
- Kingdom: Animalia
- Phylum: Arthropoda
- Clade: Pancrustacea
- Class: Insecta
- Order: Diptera
- Family: Diopsidae
- Subfamily: Diopsinae
- Genus: Cyrtodiopsis; Frey, 1928

Genus of flies

External image
- Images at iNaturalist

Cyrtodiopsis is a genus of South-east Asian stalk-eyed flies in the subfamily Diopsinae.

== Species ==
The Global Biodiversity Information Facility lists:

1. Cyrtodiopsis concava Yang & Chen, 1998 (Yunnan)
2. Cyrtodiopsis guangxiensis Liu, Wu & Yang, 2013
3. Cyrtodiopsis plauta Yang & Chen, 1998 (Yunnan)
4. Cyrtodiopsis pseudoconcava Li, Wu & Yang, 2009
5. Cyrtodiopsis tibetana Yang, 2004
6. Cyrtodiopsis yunnanensis Li, Wu & Yang, 2009

Note

The following are now placed in genus Teleopsis Rondani, 1875

- Cyrtodiopsis africana Shillito, 1940 (Uganda, Congo)
- Cyrtodiopsis currani Shillito, 1940 (Thailand)
- Cyrtodiopsis dalmanni (Wiedemann, 1830) (Malaysia)
