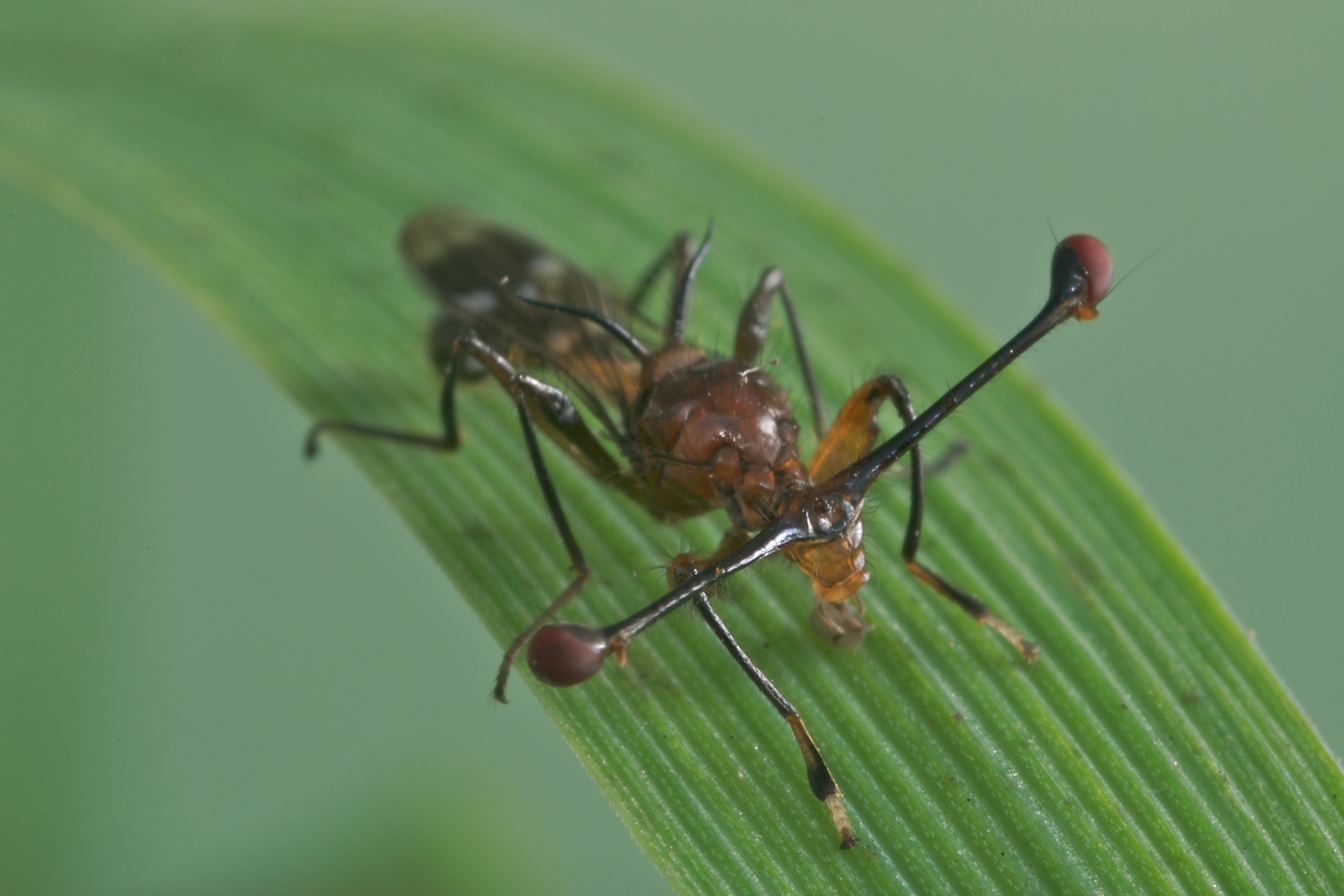

Scientific classification
- Kingdom: Animalia
- Phylum: Arthropoda
- Clade: Pancrustacea
- Class: Insecta
- Order: Diptera
- Family: Diopsidae
- Genus: Teleopsis
- Species: T. dalmanni

Binomial name
- Teleopsis dalmanni (Wiedemann, 1830)

Synonyms
- Cyrtodiopsis dalmanni (Wiedemann, 1830)

= Teleopsis dalmanni =

Species of fly

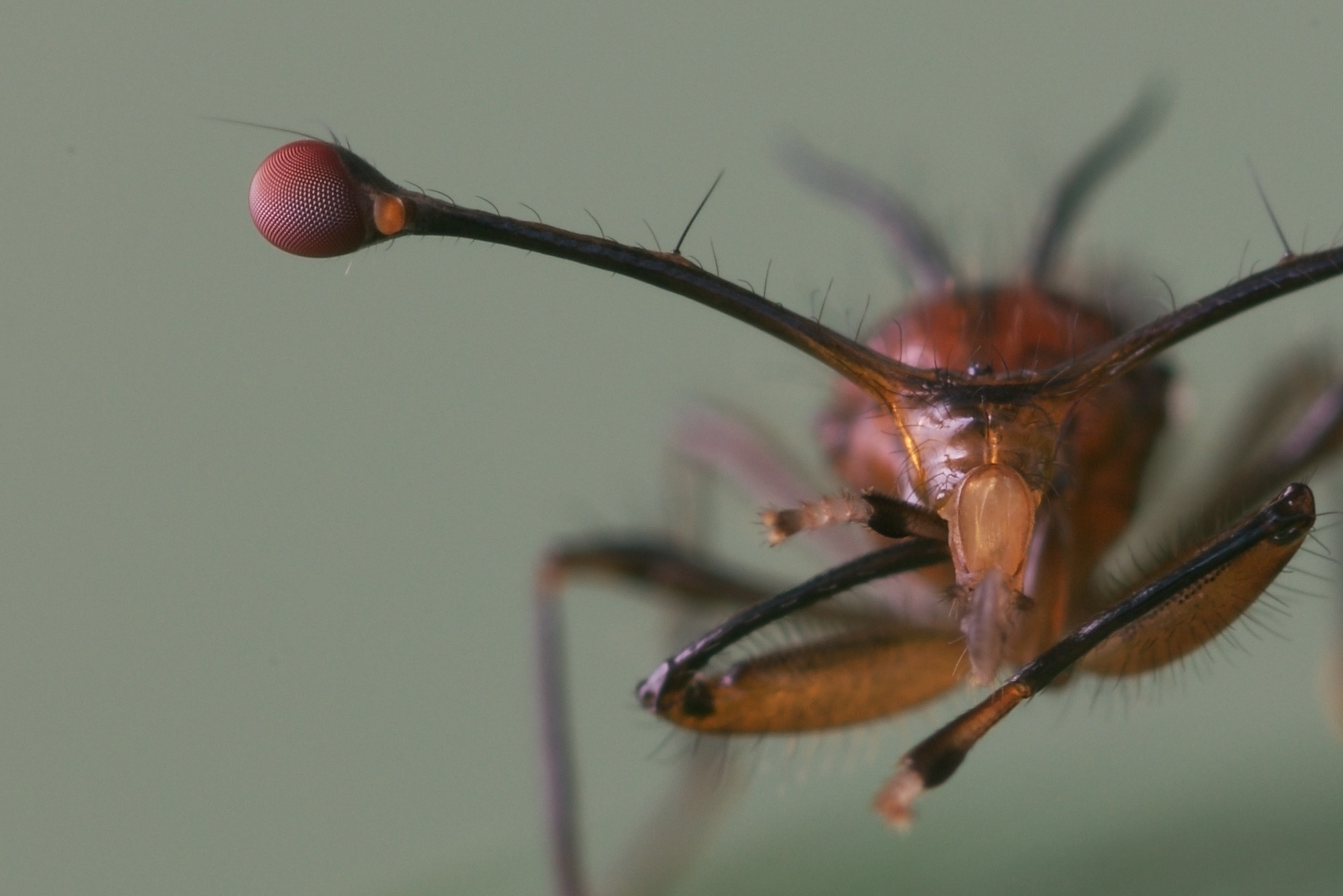
Eyestalk close up Teleopsis dalmanni

Teleopsis dalmanni, synonym Cyrtodiopsis dalmanni, also known as the Malaysian stalk-eyed fly, is a species of fly in the family Diopsidae. T. dalmanni flies possess lateral elongations on their head capsules called eyestalks. These eyestalks play an important role in mate selection and as a result physical characteristic of the fly has been the subject of several studies on sexual selection, natural selection, and mating behavior.

== Distribution ==
Teleopsis dalmanni is found in Malaysia as well as other parts of Southeast Asia. Flies used in studies are usually collected in Malaysia.

== Habitat ==
Teleopsis dalmanni are predominantly found at the edge of forest streams, where their mating rituals occur. They have been observed resting on dried leaves or undergrowth at the water's edge, and occasionally even on the sand.

== Life cycle ==
As with other Dipterans, T. dalmanni flies undergo a larval phase before transitioning into adults. There is little information available on the systematics and behavior of the larval stage in T. dalmanni. As holometabolous insects, the flies have dividing cells restricted to the gut and gonads. Due to this, the adult size is fixed by the nutrition received in the larval phase. Following the larval stage, further nutrition is required for the development of internal reproductive structures to reach sexual maturity.

Breeding experiments typically assign three to six weeks for these flies to reach sexual maturity, but a value for wild fly populations has not been determined with confidence. Sexual maturity can be indicated by accessory gland growth, maturing of sperm bundles, and sperm motility. Accessory gland growth was found to have the largest effect on sexual maturity, but it is not the sole effect.

== Food resources ==
Adult flies exhibit solitary foraging behavior, feeding on rotting vegetative matter in the daytime.

== Mating ==
Female T. dalmanni roost on root threads overhanging streams at dusk. Males compete to gain control of these root hairs. Upon gaining control of a root hair they form harems, and females decide which male's harem to join. Studies have shown that females prefer to roost with males with larger eye-spans. Mating occurs at dawn, and usually multiple mating events take place. Research shows that increased mating frequency correlates with a higher proportion of fertile eggs. This is supported by the idea that multiple matings do not reduce the receptivity of a female fly to copulation, regardless of the characteristics of the mating male. Studies showed that the number of copulation events rather than the number of mates led to an increase in hatching success. Additionally, a large number of copulations are unsuccessful, with a study finding that females that copulated once had a hatching success rate of only 10%. Copulation specifics are not entirely understood, but some copulation events are rapid and last less than 60 seconds.

=== Spermatophores ===
Male flies produce gourd-shaped spermatophores that occupy only a part of the vaginal capacity, as compared to the spermatophores of certain other diopsid flies that occupy the entire vaginal cavity. It has been suggested that the smaller size of the spermatophore is an adaptation to reduce investment in sperm due to a high mating frequency in a short amount of time. Accessory glands are responsible for forming the spermatophore that transports sperm during mating.

== Morphology ==
=== Eyestalks ===
The eyestalks of T. dalmanni, as well as other Diopsidae flies, are frequently used to study the fields of sexual selection and mating preference. Eyestalks have been known to range from 4 mm in length up to 17 mm. Eyestalks can even be longer than body length.

Hyperencephaly of the type that resembles the eyestalks in T. dalmanni is seen is other Dipteran organisms, but flies of the family Diopsidae are unique in that both males and females display some degree of eyestalk elongation. In T. dalmanni flies, males have larger eye-spans relative to body length compared to females. This feature of the fly is subject to studies that investigate the genetic background of sexual selection, female mating preferences and reproductive consequences.

==== Mate choice ====
Eyestalks play an important role in mating behavior, as studies have shown that females prefer males with larger eye spans relative to body length. It was found that female preference for large eye-spans is evident when the difference between eye-spans of available males is large, not moderate. In cases of low and moderate difference, a female with a large eye-span is more likely to pick the male with larger eye-span. There are multiple theories posited to explain this, including the idea that female preference for male eye-span may have a ceiling, or that female choice is linked genetically to female eye-span.

==== Sexual selection ====
Sexual selection posits that structures that are perceived as reliable indicators of individual quality are selected for. Teleopsis dalmanni eyestalks are an example of sexual dimorphism that has developed for mating purposes; larger eye-span is selected for as evidence indicates that it is preferred by females. A study also found that female individuals with larger eye-spans had significantly more mature oocytes than those with shorter eye-spans.

Furthermore, eye-span independent of body size or mass has been identified as the key determinant in the outcomes of contests between males. This suggests that longer eyestalks developed in males as a result of mating success pressure, and hence are an example of sexual selection. However, it has been shown that females that mated with males with large eye-spans did not receive short-term fecundity benefits and fertility benefits, and in fact recorded a lower fertility rate than females mating with males with short eye-spans.

==== Handicap hypothesis ====
Male eye-span is strongly dependent on conditional factors, comparatively more than other non-sexual traits, and eye-span becomes variable under conditions of increased stress. Similar patterns are not seen in comparable nonsexual traits, and are more closely correlated with body size. The hypothesis drawn from these results is that eye-span provides additional information about the condition beyond that provided by body size. Hence eye-span could be an alternative indication to females of the male's greater ability to survive. This relates to the handicap theory of evolution of ornamental male traits.

However, studies cite a lack of evidence to support the idea that the extended eye-stalks are a handicap to male Diopsid flies. While the eye-stalk increases the moment of inertia of male flies, they were not found to suffer a flight performance decrement. Specifically T. dalmanni male flies were found to perform better than females in free-flying turning behavior. If longer eyespans do not pose a handicap to male flies, an alternative explanation may be more successful in explaining the development of this trait.

=== Eyes ===
Teleopsis dalmanni has been used as a study subject in experimental subject in studies on data processing in insect optic centers, as it is easy to record impulse activity in the eyestalk.
