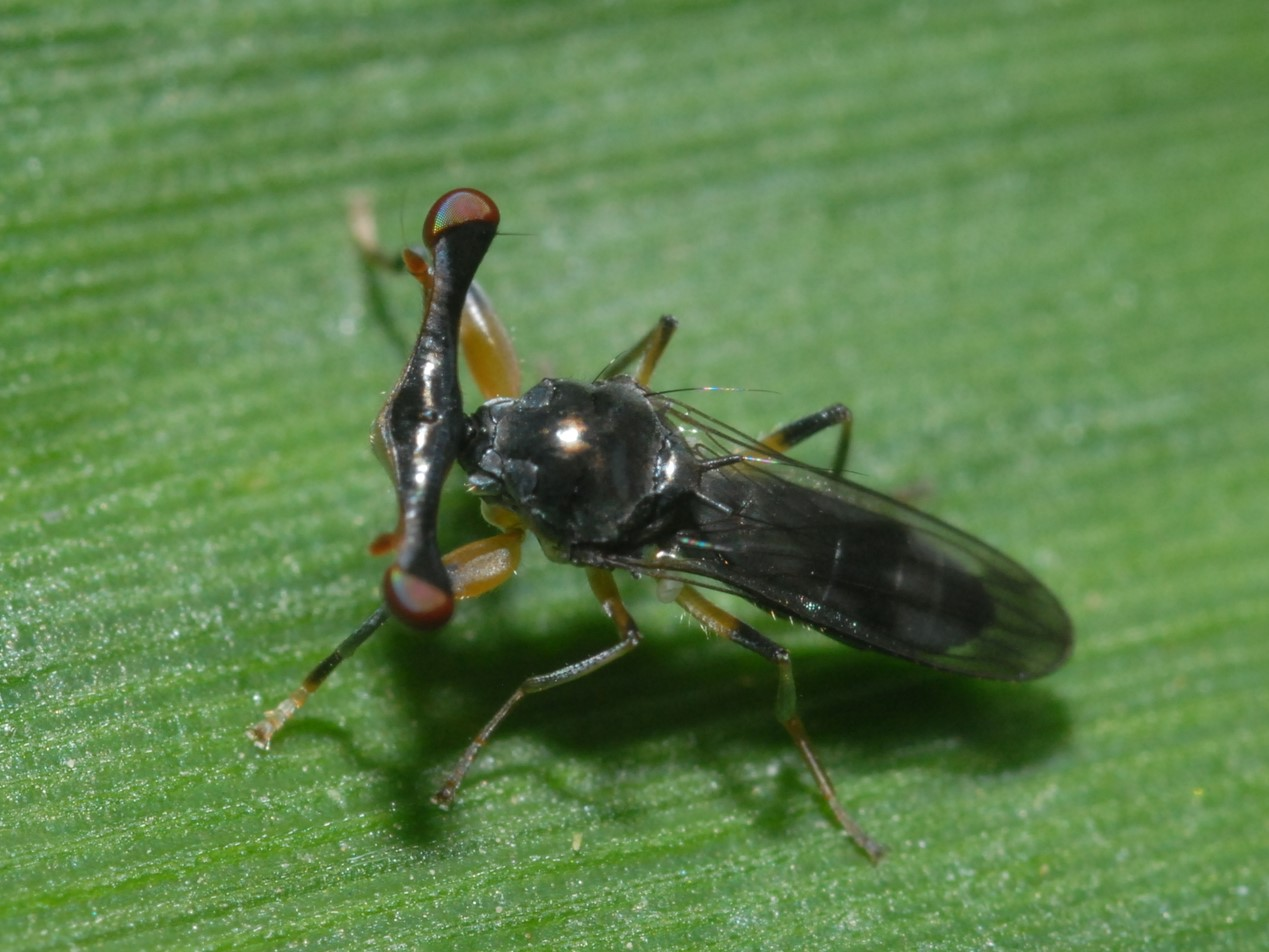
- Pseudodiopsis detrahens

Scientific classification
- Kingdom: Animalia
- Phylum: Arthropoda
- Clade: Pancrustacea
- Class: Insecta
- Order: Diptera
- Family: Diopsidae
- Subfamily: Diopsinae
- Genus: Pseudodiopsis; Hendel, 1917

Type species
- Sphyracephala cothurnata Bigot, 1874

= Pseudodiopsis =

Genus of flies

Pseudodiopsis is a genus of stalk-eyed flies in the family Diopsidae.

== Species ==
- P. bipunctipennis (Senior-White, 1922)
- P. detrahens (Walker, 1860)
