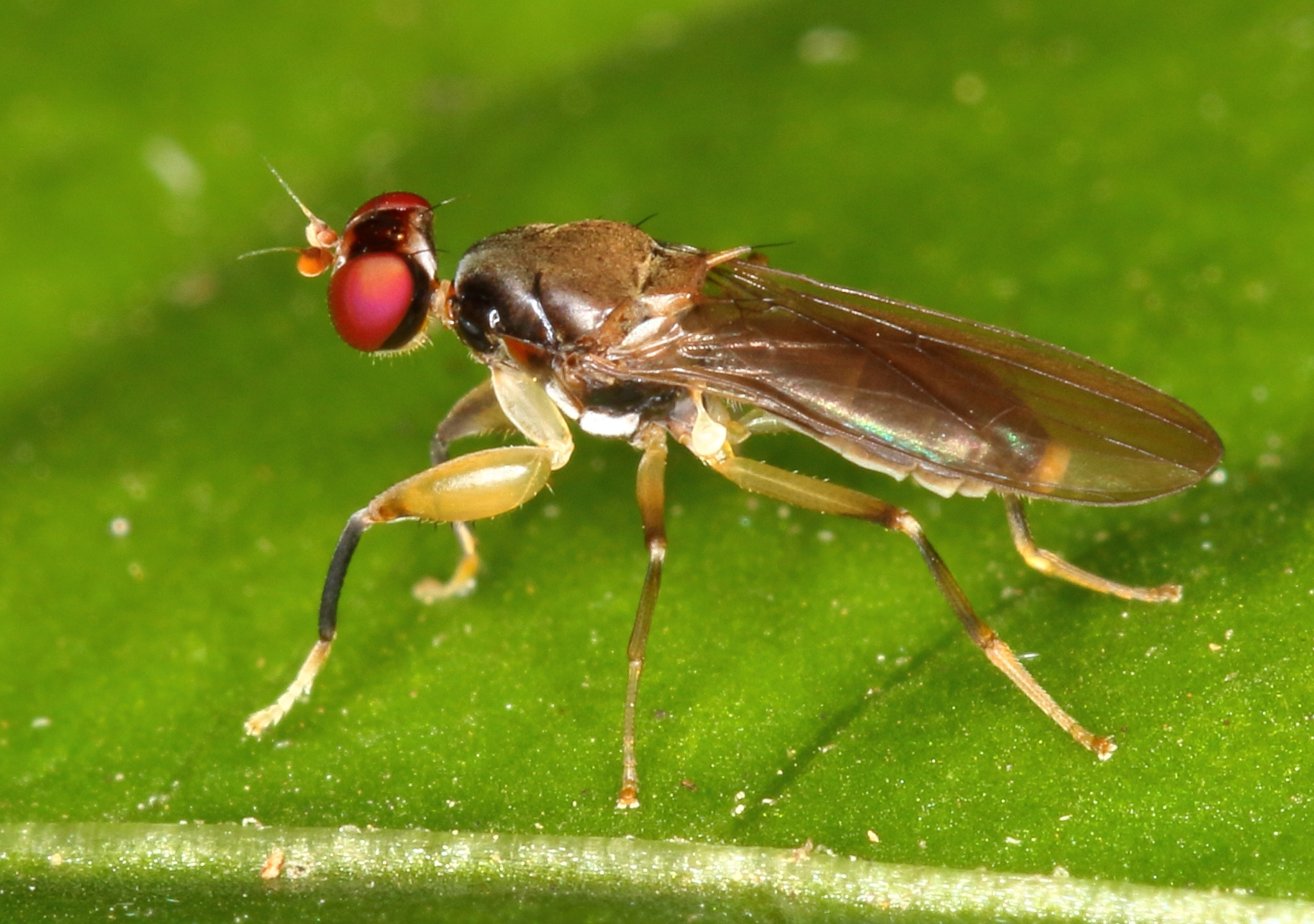
- Teloglabrus pelecyformis

Scientific classification
- Kingdom: Animalia
- Phylum: Arthropoda
- Clade: Pancrustacea
- Class: Insecta
- Order: Diptera
- Family: Diopsidae
- Subfamily: Centrioncinae
- Genus: Teloglabrus; Feijen, 1983

Type species
- Teloglabrus sanorum Feijen, 1983

= Teloglabrus =

Genus of flies

Teloglabrus is a genus of African stalk-eyed flies in the family Diopsidae.

== Species ==
- T. australis Feijen, 1983
- T. curvipes Feijen, 1983
- T. duplospinosus Feijen, 1983
- T. entabensis Feijen, 1983
- T. lebombensis Feijen, 1983
- T. londti Feijen, 1983
- T. milleri Feijen, 1983
- T. pelecyformis Feijen, 1983
- T. prolongatus Feijen, 1983
- T. sabiensis Feijen, 1983
- T. sanorum Feijen, 1983
- T. stuckenbergi Feijen, 1983
- T. trituberculatus Feijen, 1983
- T. tsitsikamensis Feijen, 1983
- T. vumbensis Feijen, 1983
