= Cladodiopsis =

Scientific classification
- Kingdom: Animalia
- Phylum: Arthropoda
- Clade: Pancrustacea
- Class: Insecta
- Order: Diptera
- Family: Diopsidae
- Subfamily: Diopsinae
- Genus: Cladodiopsis; Séguy, 1949

Type species
- Cladodiopsis seyrigi Séguy, 1949

Genus of flies

Cladodiopsis is a genus of stalk-eyed flies in the subfamily Diopsinae from Madagascar.

== Species ==
- C. leptophylla Séguy, 1949
- C. seyrigi Séguy, 1949
- C. sicardi Séguy, 1949
