= Diopsina =

Scientific classification
- Kingdom: Animalia
- Phylum: Arthropoda
- Clade: Pancrustacea
- Class: Insecta
- Order: Diptera
- Family: Diopsidae
- Subfamily: Diopsinae
- Genus: Diopsina; Curran, 1928

Type species
- Diopsina ferruginea Curran, 1928

Genus of flies

Diopsina is a genus of stalk-eyed flies in the family Diopsidae.

== Species ==
- Diopsina draconigena Feijen, 1981
- Diopsina ferruginea Curran, 1928
- Diopsina fluegeli Feijen, 2013
- Diopsina intermedia Feijen, 1984
- Diopsina kwaipai Feijen, 1981
- Diopsina nitida (Adams, 1903)
- Diopsina schulteni Feijen, 1978
