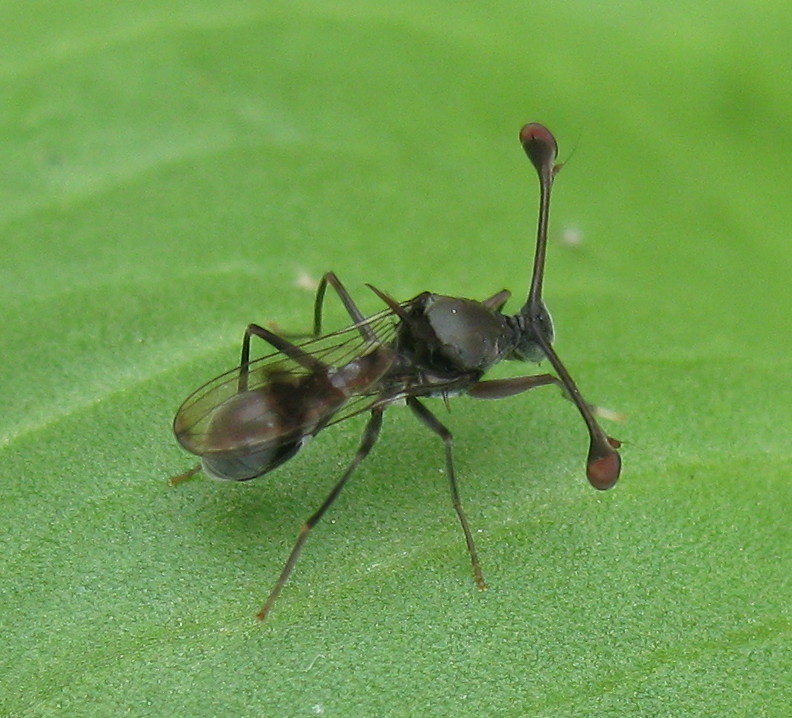
- Stalk-eyed fly (Diasemopsis sp.)

Scientific classification
- Kingdom: Animalia
- Phylum: Arthropoda
- Clade: Pancrustacea
- Class: Insecta
- Order: Diptera
- Family: Diopsidae
- Subfamily: Diopsinae
- Genus: Diasemopsis; Rondani, 1875

Type species
- Diopsis aethiopica Rondani, 1873

Synonyms
- Chaetodiopsis Séguy, 1955

= Diasemopsis =

Genus of flies

Diasemopsis is a genus of stalk-eyed flies in the family Diopsidae. They are known from sub-Saharan Africa.

== Species ==
- D. aethiopica (Rondani, 1873)
- D. albifacies Curran, 1931 (Central Africa)
- D. amora Curran, 1931 (Zimbabwe)
- D. apifasciata Brunetti, 1928 (Ghana)
- D. comoroensis Carr & Foeldvari, 2006
- D. concolor (Westwood, 1837) (Zimbabwe)
- D. coniortodes (Speiser, 1910) (Tanzania)
- D. conjuncta Curran, 1931 (Cameroon)
- D. dejecta Curran, 1931 (Congo)
- D. disconcerta Curran, 1931 (Liberia, Cameroon)
- D. dubia (Bigot, 1874)
- D. elegantula Brunetti, 1926 (Congo, South Africa)
- D. elongata Curran, 1931 (Liberia, Cameroon, Congo)
- D. exquisita Brunetti, 1928 (Sierra Leone, Côte d'Ivoire, Congo)
- D. fasciata (Gray, 1832)
- D. fusca Lindner, 1954 (Tanzania)
- D. fuscapicis Brunetti, 1928 (Cameroon, Gabon)
- D. fuscivenis Brunetti, 1926 (Congo)
- D. hirsuta Curran, 1931 (Congo)
- D. hirta Lindner, 1954 (Tanzania)
- D. horni Curran, 1931
- D. jeanneli Séguy, 1938
- D. jillyi Feijen, 1978 (Congo)
- D. latifascia (Brunetti, 1928)
- D. longipedunculata Brunetti, 1928
- D. meigenii (Westwood, 1837) (Widespread Afrotropical Region)
- D. minuta (Séguy, 1955) (Cameroun, Ivory Coast)
- D. munroi Curran, 1931 (South Africa)
- D. nebulosa Curran, 1931
- D. obscura (Westwood, 1837) (Sierra Leone)
- D. obstans (Walker, 1861) (South Africa)
- D. pleuritica Curran, 1931 (Congo, Zambia)
- D. pulchella Eggers, 1916 (Uganda, Cameroun)
- D. quadrata Curran, 1931
- D. robusta Brunetti, 1926 (Congo)
- D. sexnotata Brunetti, 1928 (Gabon)
- D. siderata Séguy, 1955 (Ivory Coast)
- D. signata (Dalman, 1817) (Sierra Leone, Congo)
- D. silvatica Eggers, 1916
- D. subfuscata Brunetti, 1926 (Congo)
- D. thaxteri Curran, 1931 (Cameroun)
- D. thomyris (Séguy, 1955)
- D. wolteri Lindner, 1954 (Tanzania, Congo)
