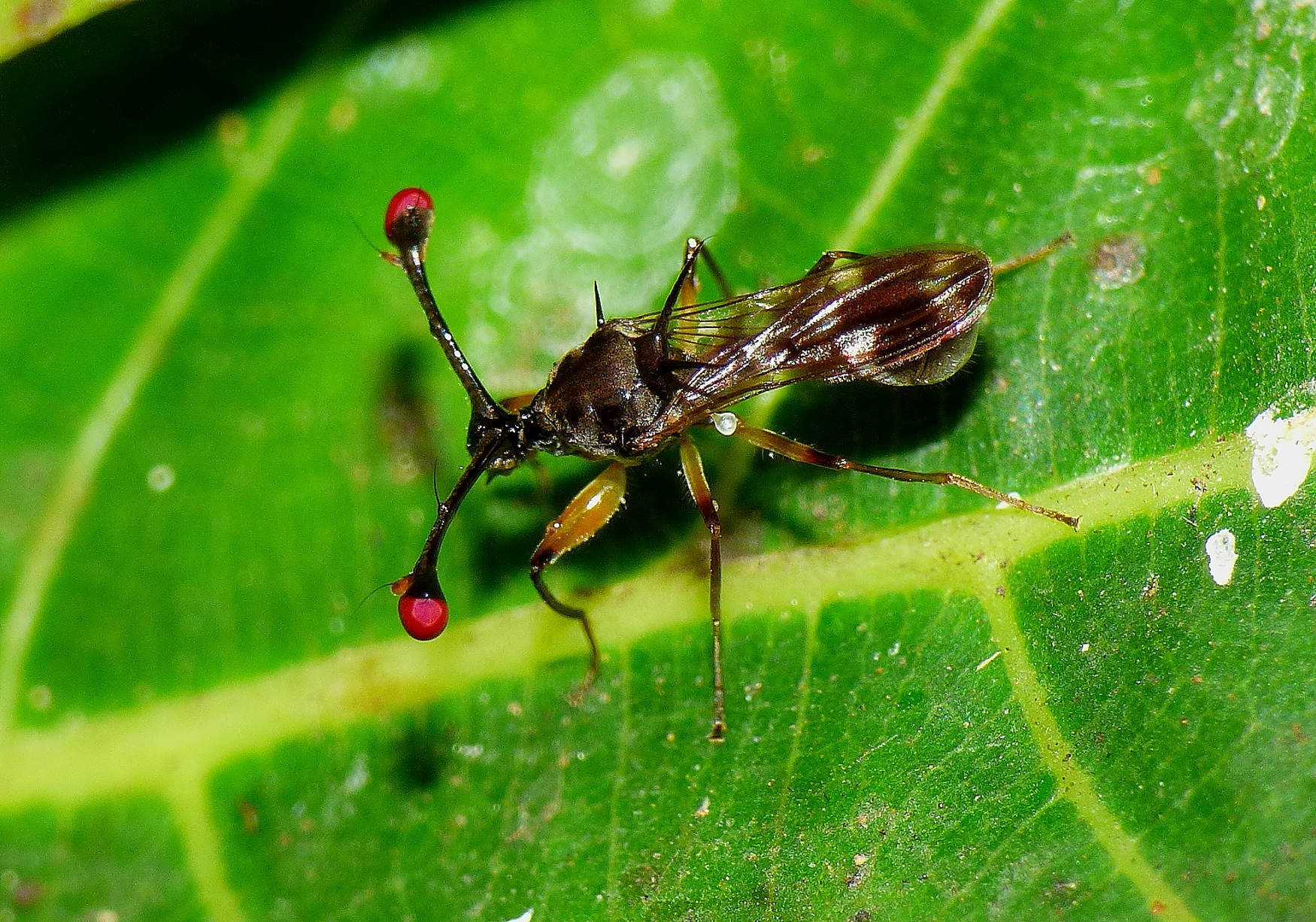
- Teleopsis sykesii, Kolhapur district, Maharashtra, India

Scientific classification
- Kingdom: Animalia
- Phylum: Arthropoda
- Clade: Pancrustacea
- Class: Insecta
- Order: Diptera
- Family: Diopsidae
- Genus: Teleopsis
- Species: T. sykesii

Binomial name
- Teleopsis sykesii (Westwood, 1837)

Synonyms
- Diopsis sykesi Westwood, 1837

= Teleopsis sykesii =

Species of fly

Teleopsis sykesii is the type species of the genus Teleopsis of stalk-eyed flies in the family Diopsidae, and was described from India.

== Distribution ==
This species is distributed in India (Maharashtra, Goa, Karnataka, Kerala, Tamil Nadu) and Myanmar
