= Eosiopsis =

Scientific classification
- Kingdom: Animalia
- Phylum: Arthropoda
- Clade: Pancrustacea
- Class: Insecta
- Order: Diptera
- Family: Diopsidae
- Subfamily: Diopsinae
- Genus: Eosiopsis; Feijen, 2008

Type species
- Diopsis sinensis Ôuchi, 1942

Synonyms
- Sinodiopsis Feijen, 1989 (Preocc.)

Genus of flies

Eosiopsis is a genus of Asian stalk-eyed flies in the family Diopsidae.

== Species ==
- E. orientalis (Ôuchi, 1942)
- E. pumila (Yang & Chen, 1998)
- E. sinensis (Ôuchi, 1942)
