= Eurydiopsis =

Scientific classification
- Kingdom: Animalia
- Phylum: Arthropoda
- Clade: Pancrustacea
- Class: Insecta
- Order: Diptera
- Family: Diopsidae
- Subfamily: Diopsinae
- Genus: Eurydiopsis; Frey, 1928

Type species
- Diopsis subnotata Westwood, 1847

Genus of flies

Eurydiopsis is a genus of stalk-eyed flies in the family Diopsidae. from Malesia'

== Species ==
1. Eurydiopsis argentifera (Bigot, 1874)
2. Eurydiopsis brevispinus Feijen, 1999
3. Eurydiopsis conflata Yang & Chen, 1998
4. Eurydiopsis glabrostylus Feijen, 1999
5. Eurydiopsis helsdingeni Feijen, 1999
6. Eurydiopsis pachya Chen & Wang, 2006
7. Eurydiopsis porphyria Chen & Wang, 2006
8. Eurydiopsis pseudohelsdingeni Chen & Wang, 2006
9. Eurydiopsis sarawakensis Feijen, 1999
10. Eurydiopsis subnotata (Westwood, 1847)
