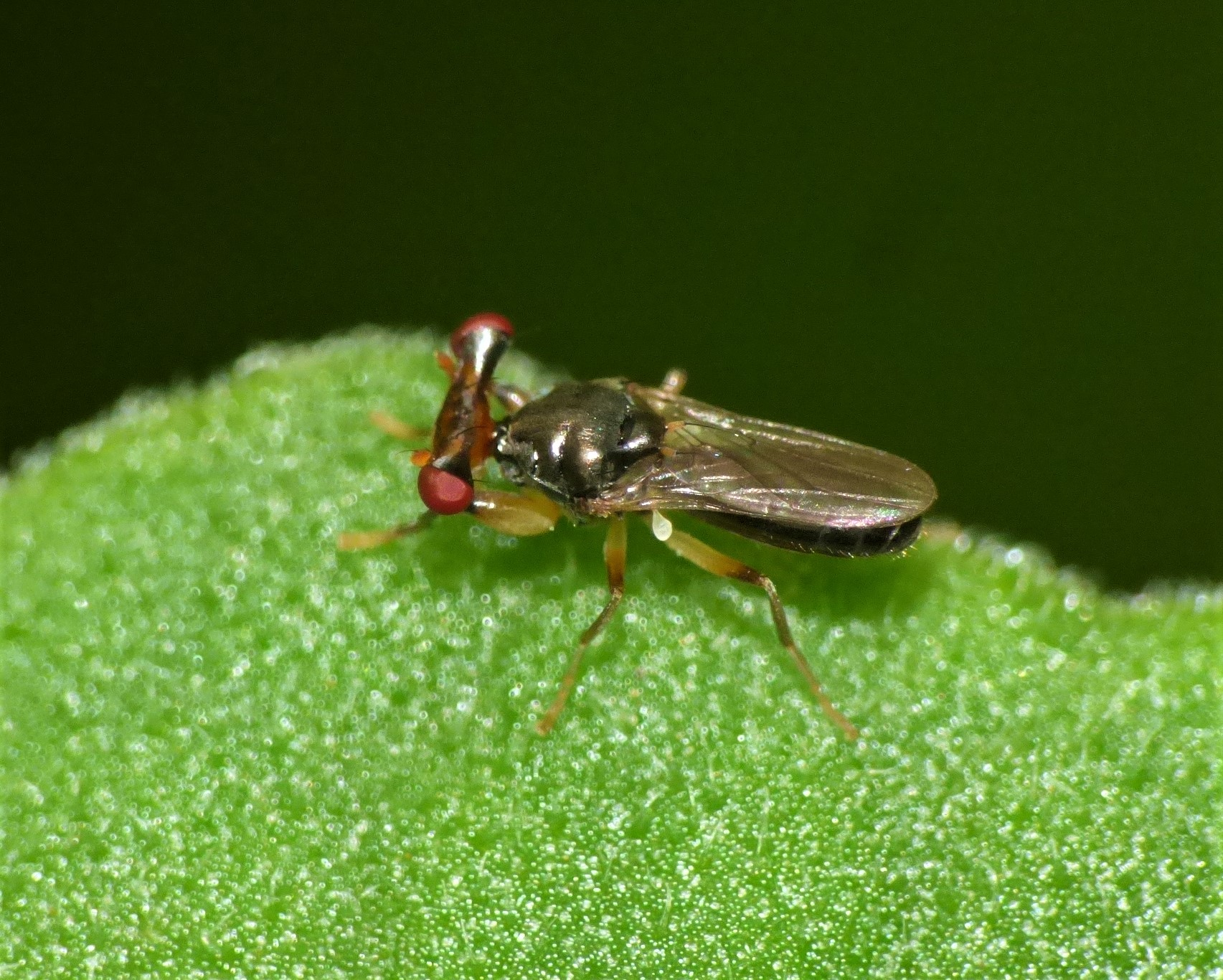
- Sphyracephala hearseiana, Udaipur, India

Scientific classification
- Kingdom: Animalia
- Phylum: Arthropoda
- Clade: Pancrustacea
- Class: Insecta
- Order: Diptera
- Family: Diopsidae
- Subfamily: Diopsinae
- Genus: Sphyracephala; Say, 1828

Synonyms
- Hexechopsis Rondani, 1875; Microdiopsis Curran, 1934; Pseudodiopsis Hendel, 1917; Sphryracephala Gray, 1832; Zygocephala Rondani, 1875

= Sphyracephala =

Genus of flies

Sphyracephala is a genus of stalk-eyed flies in the family Diopsidae, with records from Africa, Europe, Asia and N. America.

Flies are commonly found on leaves and stem of trees and plants along streams and rivers. Very large clusters of Sphyracephala are known with clusters numbering over 100,000 individual flies, with roughly half being males.

This genus resembles the presumed extinct genus Prosphyracephala, known from Baltic amber.

== Species ==
BioLib and the Global Biodiversity Information Facility lists the following species with the modifications of the recent taxonomic revision of the group.

1. Sphyracephala babadjanidesi Zaitzev, 1919
2. Sphyracephala beccarii (Rondani, 1873)
3. Sphyracephala bipunctipennis Senior-White, 1922
4. Sphyracephala brevicornis (Say, 1817)
5. Sphyracephala detrahens Walker, 1860
6. Sphyracephala hearseiana (Westwood, 1845)
7. Sphyracephala munroi Curran, 1928
8. Sphyracephala nigrimana Loew, 1873
9. Sphyracephala subbifasciata Fitch, 1855
