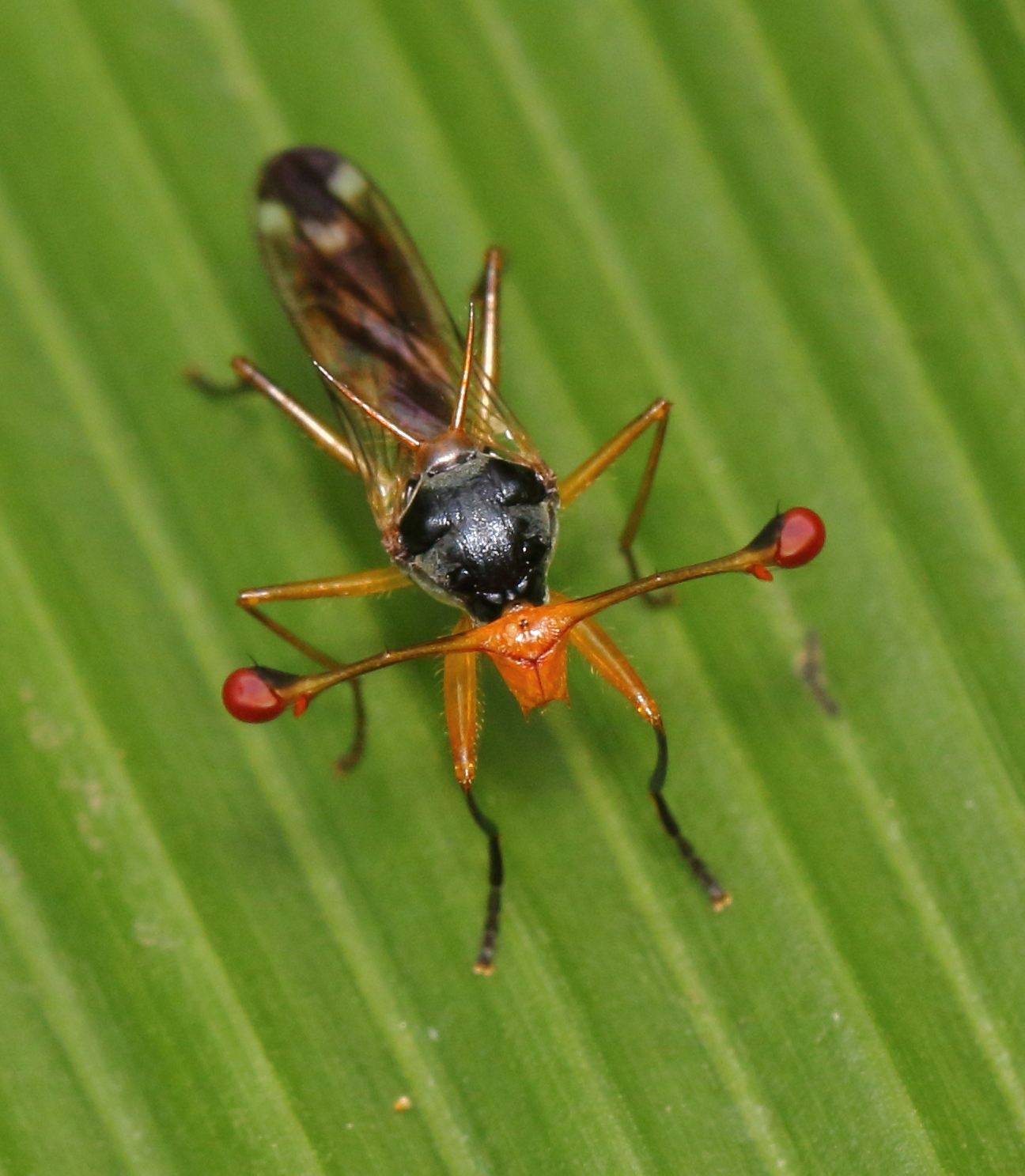
- Diopsis stuckenbergi

Scientific classification
- Kingdom: Animalia
- Phylum: Arthropoda
- Class: Insecta
- Order: Diptera
- Family: Diopsidae
- Subfamily: Diopsinae
- Genus: Diopsis; Linnaeus, 1775

= Diopsis =

Genus of stalk-eyed flies

Diopsis is the type genus of stalk-eyed flies: placed in the subfamily Diopsinae and first described by Carl Linnaeus in 1775. Species are recorded from Africa and south-east Asia.

Species such as Diopsis macrophthalma (synonym D. thoracica) and D. apicalis cause significant rice damage by boring into stems: especially in Africa.

== Species ==
The Global Biodiversity Information Facility lists:

1. Diopsis abdominalis Westwood, 1835
2. Diopsis absens Brunetti, 1926
3. Diopsis acanthophthalma Eggers, 1925
4. Diopsis angustifemur Brunetti, 1926
5. Diopsis anthracina Brunetti, 1928
6. Diopsis apicalis Dalman, 1817
7. Diopsis arabica Westwood, 1837
8. Diopsis aries Hendel, 1923
9. Diopsis atricapilla Guérin, 1836
10. Diopsis atromicans Speiser, 1910
11. Diopsis baigumensis Séguy, 1955
12. Diopsis basalis Brunetti, 1926
13. Diopsis chinica Yang & Chen, 1998
14. Diopsis circularis Macquart, 1835
15. Diopsis collaris Westwood, 1835
16. Diopsis confusa Wiedemann, 1830
17. Diopsis cruciata Curran, 1934
18. Diopsis curva Bertoloni, 1861
19. Diopsis dimidiata Curran, 1929
20. Diopsis diversipes Curran, 1928
21. Diopsis eisentrauti Lindner, 1962
22. Diopsis erythrocephala Westwood, 1837
23. Diopsis finitima Eggers, 1916
24. Diopsis flavoscutellaris Brunetti, 1928
25. Diopsis fumipennis Westwood, 1835
26. Diopsis furcata Macquart, 1846
27. Diopsis globosa Curran, 1931
28. Diopsis gnu Hendel, 1923
29. Diopsis hoplophora Hendel, 1923
30. Diopsis ichneumonea Linnaeus, 1775
31. Diopsis indica Westwood, 1835
32. Diopsis leucochira Bezzi, 1908
33. Diopsis lindneri Feijen, 1978
34. Diopsis macquartii Guérin-Méneville, 1844
35. Diopsis macromacula Brunetti, 1926
36. Diopsis macrophthalma Dalman, 1817
37. Diopsis maculithorax Brunetti, 1928
38. Diopsis melania Eggers, 1925
39. Diopsis micronotata Brunetti, 1926
40. Diopsis munroi Curran, 1929
41. Diopsis neesii Westwood, 1837
42. Diopsis nigra Illiger, 1807
43. Diopsis nigrasplendens Feijen, 1984
44. Diopsis nigriceps Eggers, 1925
45. Diopsis nigrosicus Séguy, 1949
46. Diopsis nitela Séguy, 1955
47. Diopsis orizae Séguy, 1955
48. Diopsis ornata Westwood, 1837
49. Diopsis phlogodes Hendel, 1923
50. Diopsis planidorsum Hendel, 1923
51. Diopsis pollinosa Adams, 1903
52. Diopsis preapicalis Speiser, 1910
53. Diopsis punctigera Westwood, 1835
54. Diopsis rubriceps Eggers, 1925
55. Diopsis servillei Macquart, 1844
56. Diopsis somaliensis Johnson, 1898
57. Diopsis stuckenbergi Feijen & Feijen, 2012
58. Diopsis subfasciata Macquart, 1844
59. Diopsis sulcifrons Bezzi, 1908
60. Diopsis surcoufi Séguy, 1955
61. Diopsis terminata Macquart, 1846
62. Diopsis trentepohlii Westwood, 1837
63. Diopsis wiedemanni Westwood, 1837

== Note ==
Diopsis Diesing, 1862 is a synonym of Stylochus Ehrenberg, 1831: a Turbellarian flatworm in the family Stylochidae.
