= Centrioncus =

Scientific classification
- Kingdom: Animalia
- Phylum: Arthropoda
- Clade: Pancrustacea
- Class: Insecta
- Order: Diptera
- Family: Diopsidae
- Subfamily: Centrioncinae
- Genus: Centrioncus; Speiser, 1910

Type species
- Centrioncus prodiopsis Speiser, 1910

Genus of flies

Centrioncus is a genus of African stalk-eyed flies in the family Diopsidae.

== Species ==
- C. aberrans Feijen, 1983
- C. angusticercus Feijen, 1983
- C. bytebieri De Meyer, 2004
- C. decellei Feijen, 1983
- C. decoronotus Feijen, 1983
- C. jacobae Feijen, 1983
- C. prodiopsis Speiser, 1910
