= Chasmatonotus =

Scientific classification
- Domain: Eukaryota
- Kingdom: Animalia
- Phylum: Arthropoda
- Class: Insecta
- Order: Diptera
- Family: Chironomidae
- Subfamily: Orthocladiinae
- Genus: Chasmatonotus

Genus of flies

Chasmatonotus is a genus of midges in the family Chironomidae. There are about 14 described species in Chasmatonotus.

== Species ==
These 14 species belong to the genus Chasmatonotus:

- Chasmatonotus atripes Rempel, 1937
- Chasmatonotus bicolor Rempel, 1937
- Chasmatonotus bimaculatus Osten Sacken, 1877
- Chasmatonotus brevicornis Yamamoto, 1985
- Chasmatonotus fascipennis Coquillett, 1905
- Chasmatonotus furfurosus Yamamoto, 1985
- Chasmatonotus hyalinus Coquillett, 1905
- Chasmatonotus maculipennis Rempel, 1937
- Chasmatonotus parabicolor Yamamoto, 1980
- Chasmatonotus pupivaga (Schrank, 1781)
- Chasmatonotus saigusai Yamamoto, 1980
- Chasmatonotus unilobus Yamamoto, 1980
- Chasmatonotus unimaculatus Loew, 1864
- Chasmatonotus univittatus Coquillett, 1900
