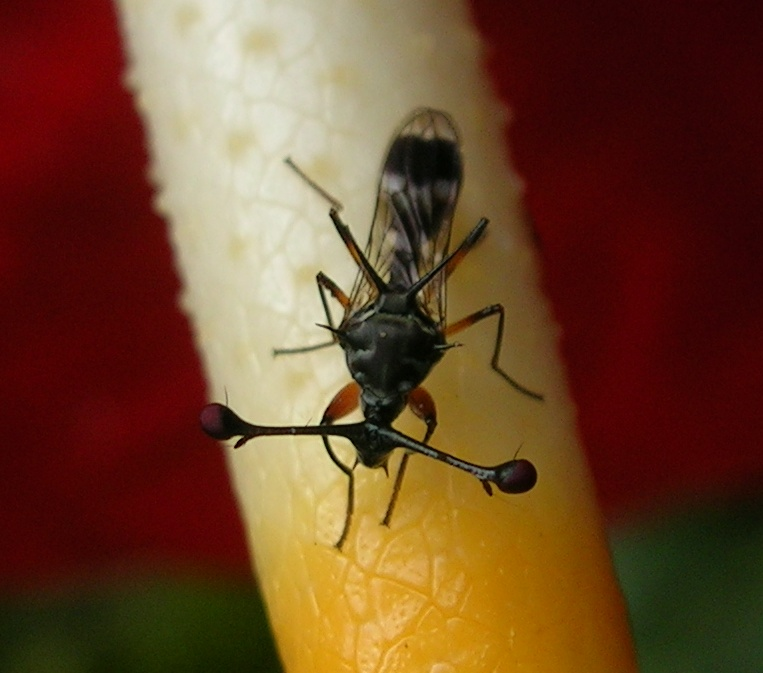
- Teleopsis amnoni

Scientific classification
- Kingdom: Animalia
- Phylum: Arthropoda
- Clade: Pancrustacea
- Class: Insecta
- Order: Diptera
- Family: Diopsidae
- Subfamily: Diopsinae
- Genus: Teleopsis; Rondani, 1875

Type species
- Diopsis sykesii Westwood, 1837

Synonyms
- Megalabops Frey, 1928

= Teleopsis =

Genus of flies

Teleopsis is a genus of stalk-eyed flies in the family Diopsidae. All species in the genus are found in Asia. About 20 species are described.

== Species ==
Several species were placed previously in the similar genus Cyrtodiopsis; the Global Biodiversity Information Facility includes:

1. Teleopsis adjacens Brunetti, 1928
2. Teleopsis africana (Shillito, 1940) Brunetti, 1928
3. Teleopsis amnoni Feijen & Feijen, 2019
4. Teleopsis anjahanaribei (Vanschuytbroeck, 1965)
5. Teleopsis boettcheri Frey, 1928
6. Teleopsis cheni Yang & Chen, 1998
7. Teleopsis cobiae Feijen, 2011
8. Teleopsis currani (Shillito, 1940)
9. Teleopsis dalmanni (Wiedemann, 1830)
10. Teleopsis discrepans (Walker, 1856)
11. Teleopsis fallax (Bigot, 1874)
12. Teleopsis ferruginea (Röder, 1893)
13. Teleopsis freyi Feijen, 2011
14. Teleopsis fujianensis Liu, Wu & Yang, 2013
15. Teleopsis fulviventris Bigot, 1880
16. Teleopsis guangxiensis Liu, Wu & Yang, 2013
17. Teleopsis hainanensis Liu, Wu & Yang, 2009
18. Teleopsis krombeini Feijen, 1998
19. Teleopsis longiscopium Rondani, 1875
20. Teleopsis maculata Feijen, 1998
21. Teleopsis motatrix Osten Sacken, 1882
22. Teleopsis neglecta Feijen & Feijen, 2020
23. Teleopsis nitidifacies Feijen, 2011
24. Teleopsis nitidiscutum Feijen, 2011
25. Teleopsis onopyxus Séguy, 1949
26. Teleopsis pallifacies Feijen & Feijen, 2011
27. Teleopsis pharao Frey, 1928
28. Teleopsis pseudotruncata Liu, Wu & Yang, 2009
29. Teleopsis quadriguttata (Walker, 1856)
30. Teleopsis quinqueguttata (Walker, 1856)
31. Teleopsis rubicunda Wulp, 1897
32. Teleopsis selecta Osten Sacken, 1882
33. Teleopsis sexguttata Brunetti, 1928
34. Teleopsis shillitoi Tenorio, 1969
35. Teleopsis similis Liu, Wu & Yang, 2013
36. Teleopsis sorora Feijen & Feijen, 2020
37. Teleopsis sykesii (Westwood, 1837)
38. Teleopsis thaii Földvári & Carr, 2007
39. Teleopsis trichophoras Meijere, 1916
40. Teleopsis vadoni (Vanschuytbroeck, 1965)
41. Teleopsis whitei (Curran, 1936)
42. Teleopsis wuzhishanensis Liu, Wu & Yang, 2013
43. Teleopsis yangi Liu, Wu & Yang, 2013
44. Teleopsis yunnana Yang & Chen, 1998
45. Teleopsis zhangae Liu, Wu & Yang, 2013
