= Bachelor herd =

Herd of juvenile male animals

A bachelor herd is a herd of (usually) juvenile male animals who are still sexually immature or 'harem'-forming animals who have been thrown out of their parent groups but not yet formed a new family group. It may also refer to a group of males who are not currently territorial or mating with females.

Examples include seals, dolphins, lions, and many herbivores such as deer, horses, and elephants. Bachelor herds are thought to provide useful protection for social animals against more established herd competition or aggressive, dominant males. Males in bachelor herds are sometimes closely related to each other. Some animals, for example New Zealand fur seals, live in a bachelor herd all year except for the mating season, when there is a substantial increase in aggression and competition.

In many species, males and females move in separate groups, often coming together at mating time. In many species it is common for males to leave or be driven from the group as they mature, and they may wander as lone animals or form a bachelor group for the time being. This arrangement may be long term and stable, or short term until they find a new group to join.

== Types ==
The social structure, aggression level, population size, and duration of presence of these herds across species varies greatly. Bachelor herds are most often found in mammals and are especially common in the grasslands.

=== Impala ===
Male impala form small bachelor herds during both the wet and dry seasons. These bachelor herds are generally smaller than herds of females, numbering around 4 members, compared to upwards of 10. Juvenile males begin to join bachelor herds at 8 months of age. In the Serengeti, immature or older males will usually form their own bachelor herds, while males of reproductive age are more often in mixed groups with females.

Being actively territorial in the Serengeti is physically demanding for male impala, so males occupy this role for about 3 months. Males will then join a bachelor herd, though this results in them occupying a social dominance status at the bottom of the linear rank hierarchy until their physical condition returns to pre-territorial levels. Bachelor herds may coexist with territorial males in the same area, but these individual males are always dominant above bachelor males.

Within the herds, bachelor males are less territorial toward each other than males in mixed herds. These males maintain, on average, a relatively large distance of approximately 2.5–3 metres (8.2–9.8 ft) between them. However, bachelor males exhibit reciprocal grooming despite occasional aggressive interactions between bachelors.

=== Fur seals ===
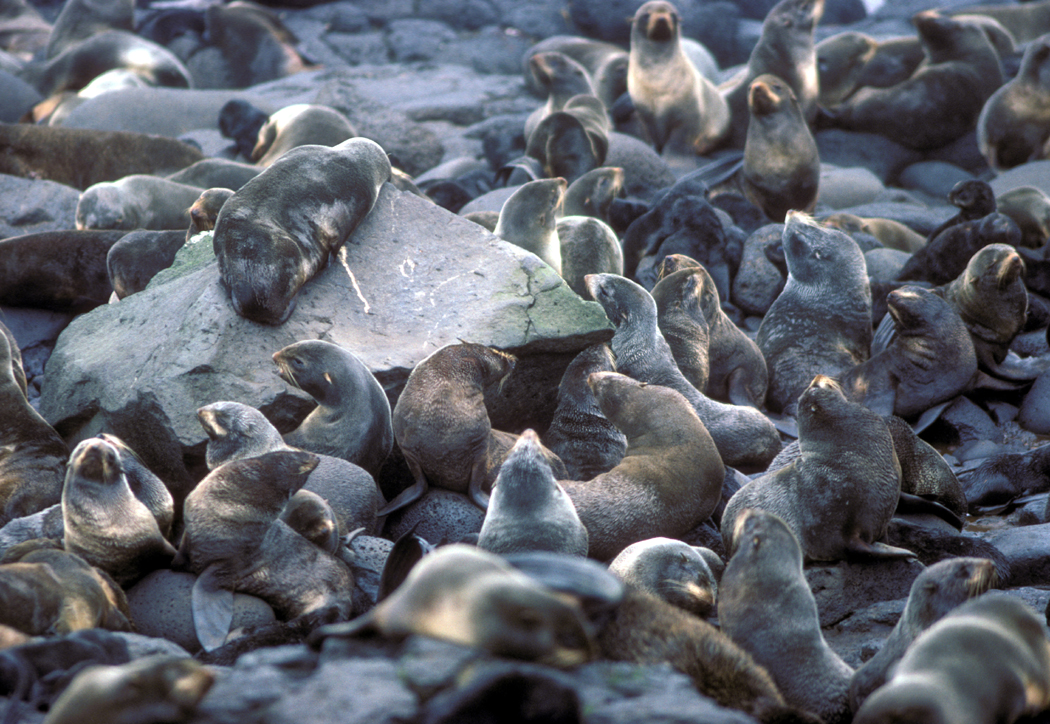
Fur seal rookery during the non-mating season at St. Paul Island, Alaska

Male fur seals, as a family, commonly live in bachelor herds during the non-breeding season. During the breeding season (April–September in the Northern Hemisphere, September–January in the Southern Hemisphere), the size of herds greatly diminishes. These bachelor herds are large in size, ranging from 15,000 to more than 20,000 seals living in one area, referred to as a rookery.

The grounds occupied by fur seal bachelor herds are generally far away from breeding grounds, anywhere from 1 mile (1.6 km) or more. Members of the group range from seals that are one year old, called yearlings, up through older seals. There appears to be no rigid social structure during the non-breeding season and there is little competition for food or mates. The male fur seals are also mostly non-aggressive.

Fur seal bachelor herds are frequently targets of the seal hunt due to large populations being concentrated in a relatively small area. There are few regulations in regard to adult male seal hunting due to limited effects on the future population.

=== Cape mountain zebras ===
Cape mountain zebra male foals often leave the breeding herd they were born in after the birth of siblings or around age 2, though the stallion of the breeding herd does not force them out. In fact, it has been observed that stallions often try to prevent foals from leaving the herd. These males then often go on to form their own bachelor herd or join an existing one. Males then stay in these bachelor herds until age 5, when they leave to become the stallion of their own breeding herd with one or more mares.

Within Cape mountain zebra bachelor herds, there is usually no social hierarchy. Dominance is given to the more senior members of the herd and when the oldest males leave to form a breeding herd, the next oldest bachelors take on the leadership role. There is minimal intragroup aggression and no observed fighting between members for a higher social position.

Bachelor herds often move with a breeding herd that is occupying a nearby area. At least one member of the bachelor herd in this case is usually the offspring of a mare in the breeding herd. Fillies also often temporarily join bachelor herds after leaving their maternal herd at the onset of their first estrus. The fillies then stay with the group until they join an existing breeding herd or make their own breeding herd with a bachelor male from the herd.

=== Red deer ===
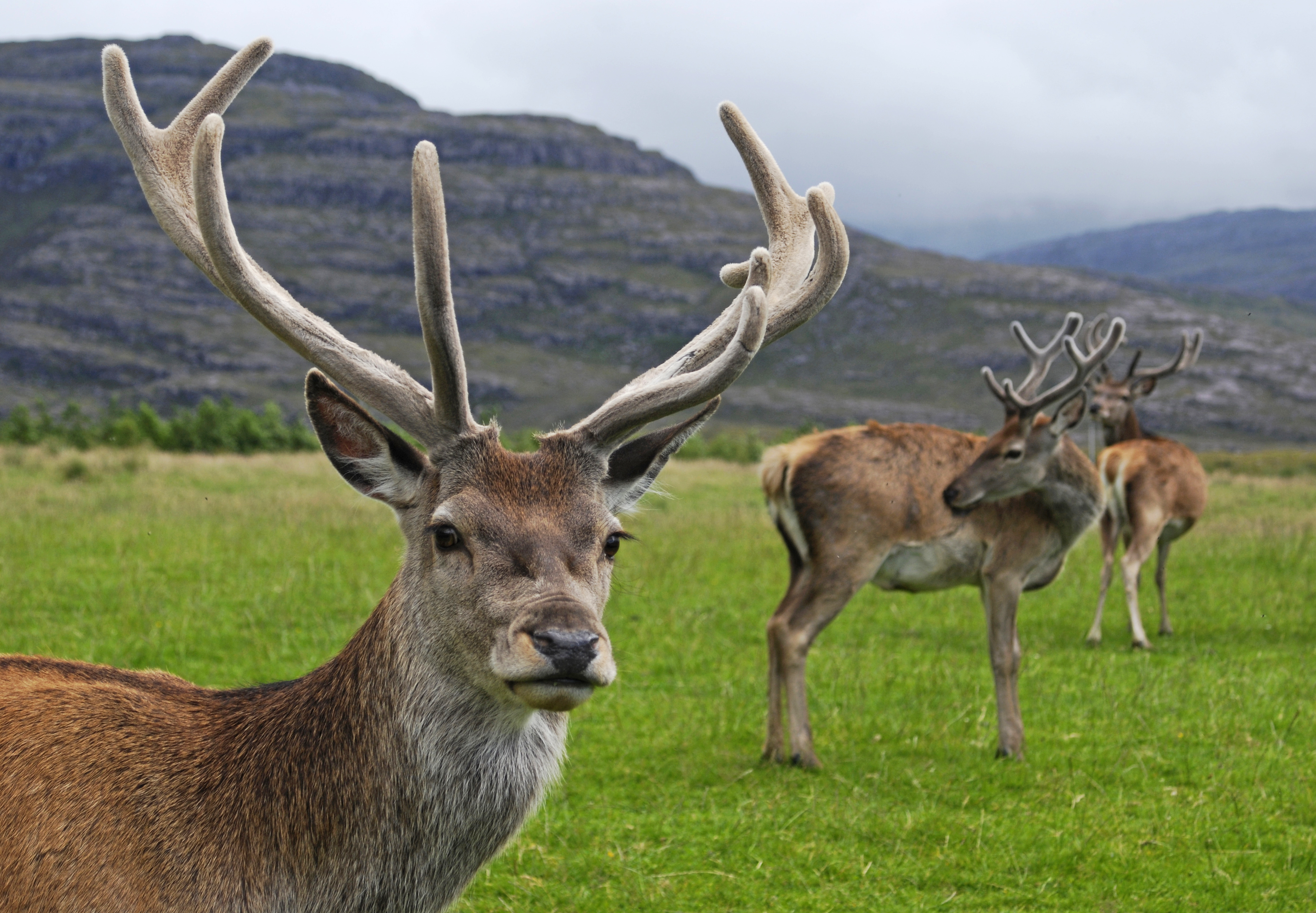
Red deer stags before shedding their antlers

Red deer males leave their mothers between 1 and 2 years of age. They then join bachelor herds, in which they spend most of the year. These herds are smaller (less than 50 members) and more unstable than the female herds and they follow a linear dominance hierarchy. This hierarchy is determined by both body size and the size of the stag's antlers, with older stags having on average larger antlers. The older stags in the herd maintain their dominance from one year to the next.

Aggression within the herd is low until the stags shed their antlers, usually in early April. Intragroup clashes then increase as the females go into estrus. Males compete with members of their own bachelor herd for the attention of the females. This is called the “rutting season” and it lasts only a few weeks before males and females separate into their respective herds. The level of aggression within the bachelor herd then decreases substantially.
