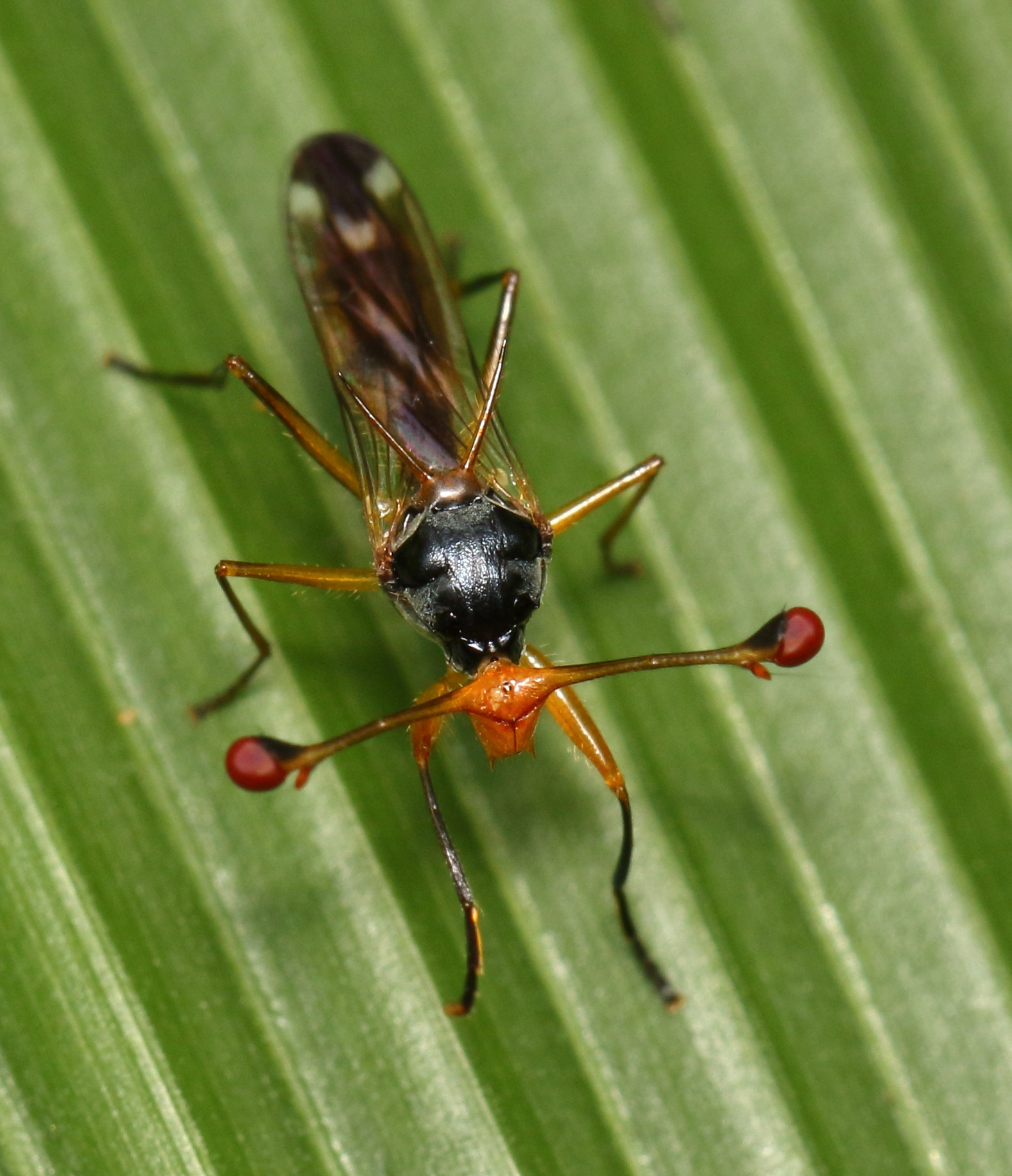
- Diopsis stuckenbergi

Scientific classification
- Kingdom: Animalia
- Phylum: Arthropoda
- Clade: Pancrustacea
- Class: Insecta
- Order: Diptera
- Clade: Cyclorrhapha
- Section: Schizophora
- Superfamily: Diopsoidea
- Family: Diopsidae; Billberg, 1820

Subfamilies
- Centrioncinae; Diopsinae

Synonyms
- Centrioncidae

= Stalk-eyed fly =

Stalk-eyed flies Temporal range: Eocene–Recent

Family of dipteran insects with antennae located on eyestalks

Stalk-eyed flies are insects of the fly family Diopsidae. The family is distinguished from most other flies by most members of the family bearing eyestalks: projections from the sides of the head with the eyes at the end. Some fly species from other families such as Drosophilidae, Platystomatidae, Richardiidae, and Tephritidae have similar heads, but the unique character of the Diopsidae is that their antennae are also located on the stalk, rather than in the middle of the head as in all other flies. Stalked eyes are present in all members of the subfamily Diopsinae, but are absent in the Centrioncinae, which retain unstalked eyes similar to those of other flies. The stalked eyes are usually sexually dimorphic, with eyestalks present but shorter in females.

The stalk-eyed flies are up to a centimeter long, and they feed on both decaying plants and animals. Their unique morphology has inspired research into how the attribute may have arisen through forces of sexual selection and natural selection. Studies of the behavior of the Diopsidae have yielded important insights into the development of sexual ornamentation, the genetic factors that maintain such a morphological feature, sexual selection, and the handicap principle.

== Distribution and habitat ==
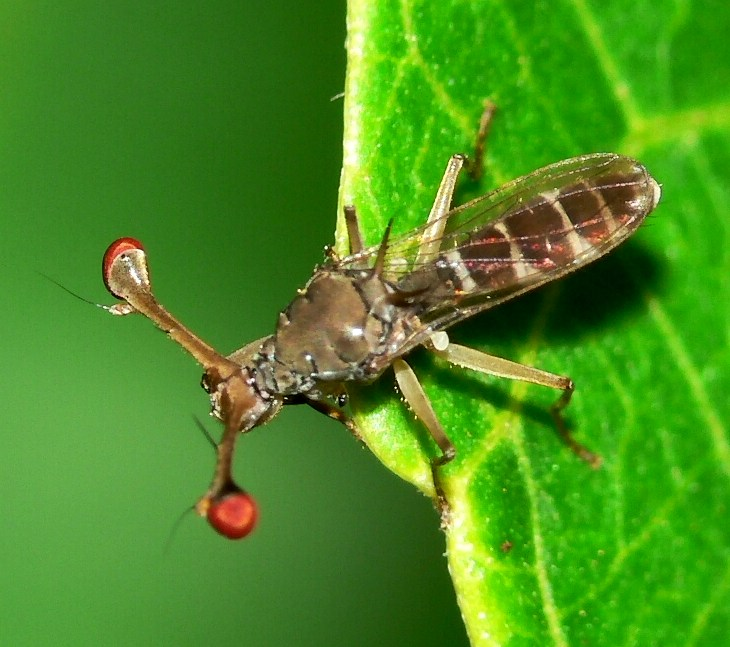
A diopsid from Cameroon

More than 100 species in the Diopsidae are known, with the greatest diversity found in the Old World tropics. They are distributed throughout the region, with the best-known species being from Southeast Asia and Southern Africa. Also, two species in North America have been described and a European species has recently been found in Hungary.

Adult diopsids are typically found on low-lying vegetation in humid areas, often near streams and rivers, where they feed on fungi and bacteria, which they scavenge from decaying vegetation. The larvae are saprophagic or phytophagous, eating decaying and fresh plant matter. Diopsis macrophthalma Dalman, 1817, is a pest of rice and sorghum in tropical Africa.

The peculiar morphology of stalk-eyed flies makes it easy to identify their fossils (e.g. in amber); one fossil genus is Prosphyracephala, known from Eocene aged Baltic amber. This genus has stalked eyes and is the earliest diverging member of the Diopsinae.

== Morphology ==
The Diopsidae are small to medium-sized flies, ranging from about 4.0 to about 12.0 mm in length. Their heads are subtriangular, with transverse eye stalks in all genera except the African genus Centrioncus and Teloglabrus. The head is usually sparsely haired, with vibrissae (whiskers) absent.

The posterior portion of the fly's metathorax, or scutellum, has a pair of stout processes, and often the laterotergite (one of a number of lateral flanges) of the postnotum (a small dorsal sclerite on the insect thorax posterior to the notum) has a dome-like swelling or spine-like process. The anterior femora of the legs are stout, with ventral spines. Adult males have lost tergites seven and eight, and the seventh sternite forms a complete ventral band.

Stalk-eyed flies, as the name implies, typically possess eyestalks (in all but the two genera listed above). Their eyes are mounted on projections from the sides of the head, and the antennae are located on the eyestalks, unlike stalk-eyed flies from other families. Though both males and females of most species have eyestalks, they are much longer in males, a sexual dimorphism thought to be due to sexual selection. A rather remarkable feature of stalk-eyed flies is their ability, shortly after they emerge from their pupae, to ingest air through their oral cavity and pump it through ducts in the head to the tips of the eye stalks, thereby elongating them while they are still soft and transparent.

== Taxonomy ==
True stalk-eyed flies are members of the family Diopsidae, first described by Fothergill, with the genus Diopsis named by Carl Linnaeus in 1775. The family Diopsidae is contained within the order Diptera and suborder Cyclorrhapha; it is divided into two subfamilies:

=== Centrioncinae ===
1. Centrioncus Speiser, 1910
2. Teloglabrus Feijen, 1983

The African genus Centrioncus (once placed in Sepsidae, but then moved to Diopsidae) was once recommended to be treated as a separate family, Centrioncidae, a sister group of the diopsids, but since then this lineage has usually been treated as a subfamily.

=== Diopsinae ===
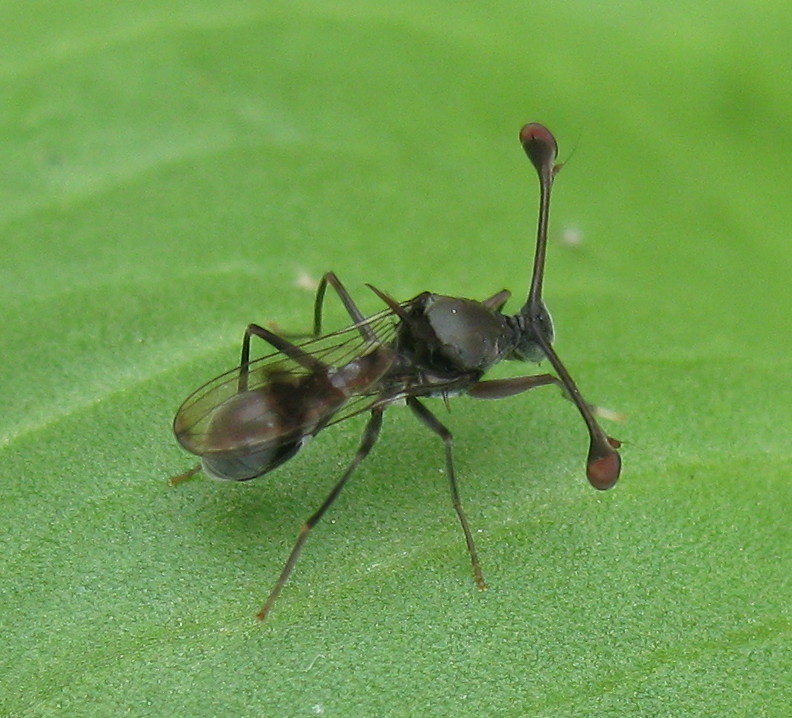
Stalk-eyed fly (Diasemopsis)

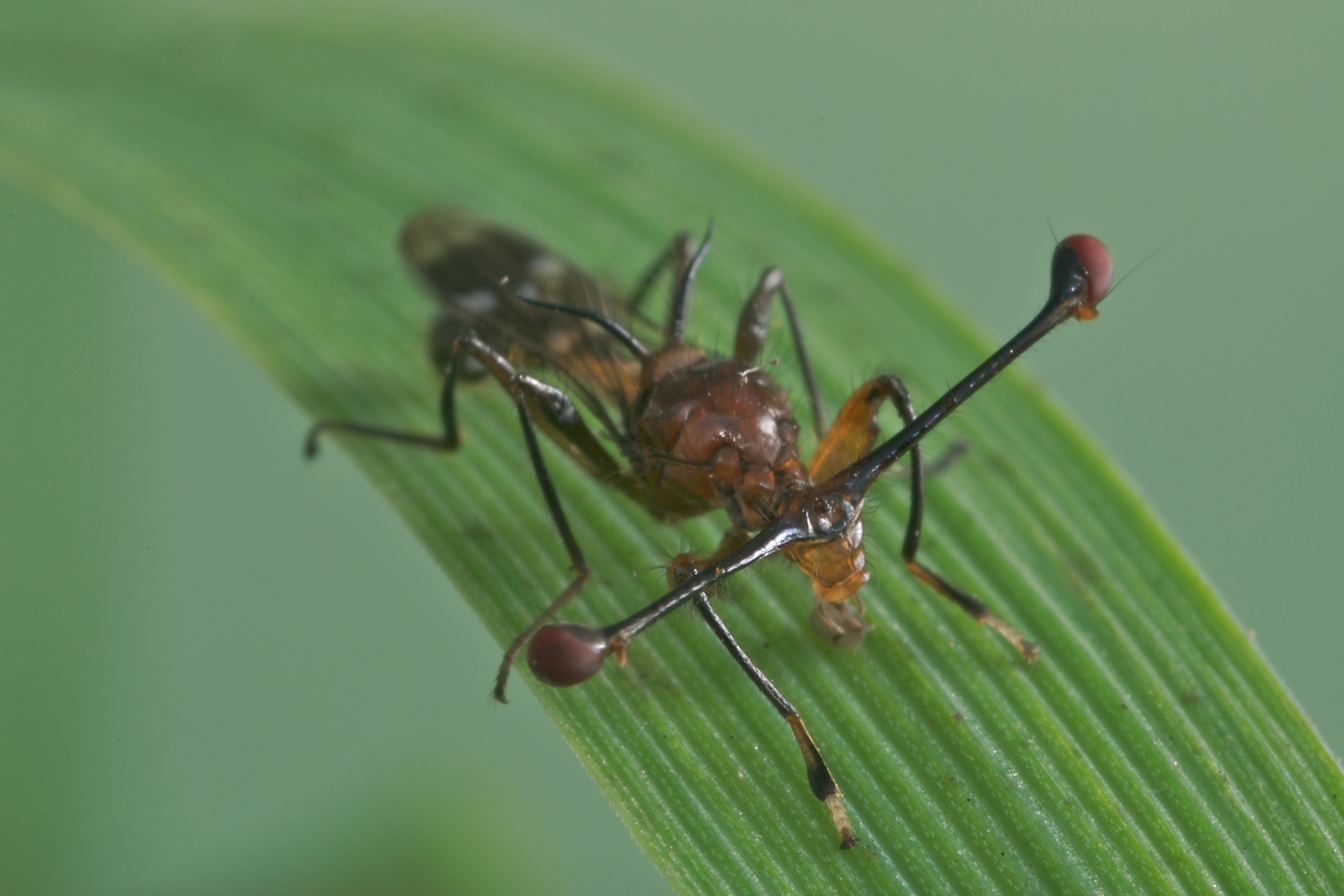
Male Teleopsis dalmanni

The Global Biodiversity Information Facility includes:

1. Cladodiopsis Séguy, 1949
2. Cobiopsis Feijen, 1989
3. Cyrtodiopsis Frey, 1928
4. Diasemopsis Rondani, 1875
5. Diopsina Curran, 1928
6. Diopsis Linnaeus, 1775
7. Eosiopsis Feijen, 2008
8. Eurydiopsis Frey, 1928
9. Madagopsina Feijen, Feijen & Feijen, 2017
10. Megalabops Frey, 1928
11. Pseudodiopsis Hendel, 1917
12. Sinodiopsis Feijen, 1989
13. Sphyracephala Say, 1828
14. Teleopsis Rondani, 1875
- †Prosphyracephala Hennig, 1965

=== Vision ===
Despite the unusual morphology of the eye, each compound eye sees a region of space extending over more than a hemisphere in all directions. Thus, extensive binocular overlap occurs, with about 70% of the ommatidia of each eye having a binocular partner ommatidium in the opposite eye which views in the same direction. The binocular field is most extensive in the frontoventral quadrant, where it reaches over 135°, and is smallest in the dorsal region. The behavior of stalk-eyed flies is very much determined by vision. During the day, temporary territories may be defended by threatening behavior. At dusk, the animals gather in small groups on selected thread-like structures, returning to the same site each day. When males of about equal size encounter one another within such a group, they may engage in ritualized fights (or occasionally contact fights). Competitors are driven away by the dominant male. Conspecifics are most likely to elicit a threat or flight reaction when they are at a distance of about 50 mm, and reactions to model flies and reflections in a mirror also occur at about this distance.

=== Mating ===
Stalk-eyed flies roost at night on root hairs hanging by streams. Mating usually takes place in the early morning in the vicinity of their roosts. Females show a strong preference for roosting and mating with males with longer eyestalks, and males compete with each other to control lekking aggregations through ritualized contest. This contest involves males facing one another and comparing their relative eye spans, often with the front legs spread apart, possibly to emphasize their eye-stalk lengths. Male stalk-eyed flies with long eyestalks gain mating advantages both because of female choice and because they are better able to compete with rival males.

=== Sexual selection ===
Though the evolution of exaggerated male traits as a result of female mate choice was at one point controversial, the Diopsidae are now regarded as a classic example of animals that exhibit sexually selected traits. One view maintains that male ornaments co-evolve with female preferences. The selection of an ornamented mate causes genes that influence expression of the selected male trait and genes coding for female preference for this trait to be passed on to offspring. This process creates linkage disequilibrium between selected alleles, with the magnitude of resulting genetic correlations influencing evolutionary outcomes. If the genetic correlation is high relative to the heritability of the male ornament, then a runaway process can occur leading to extreme sexually selected traits, such as the incredible eye spans observed in male stalk-eyed flies. Otherwise, the trait and preference for the trait increase until natural selection against further trait elaboration balances sexual selection.

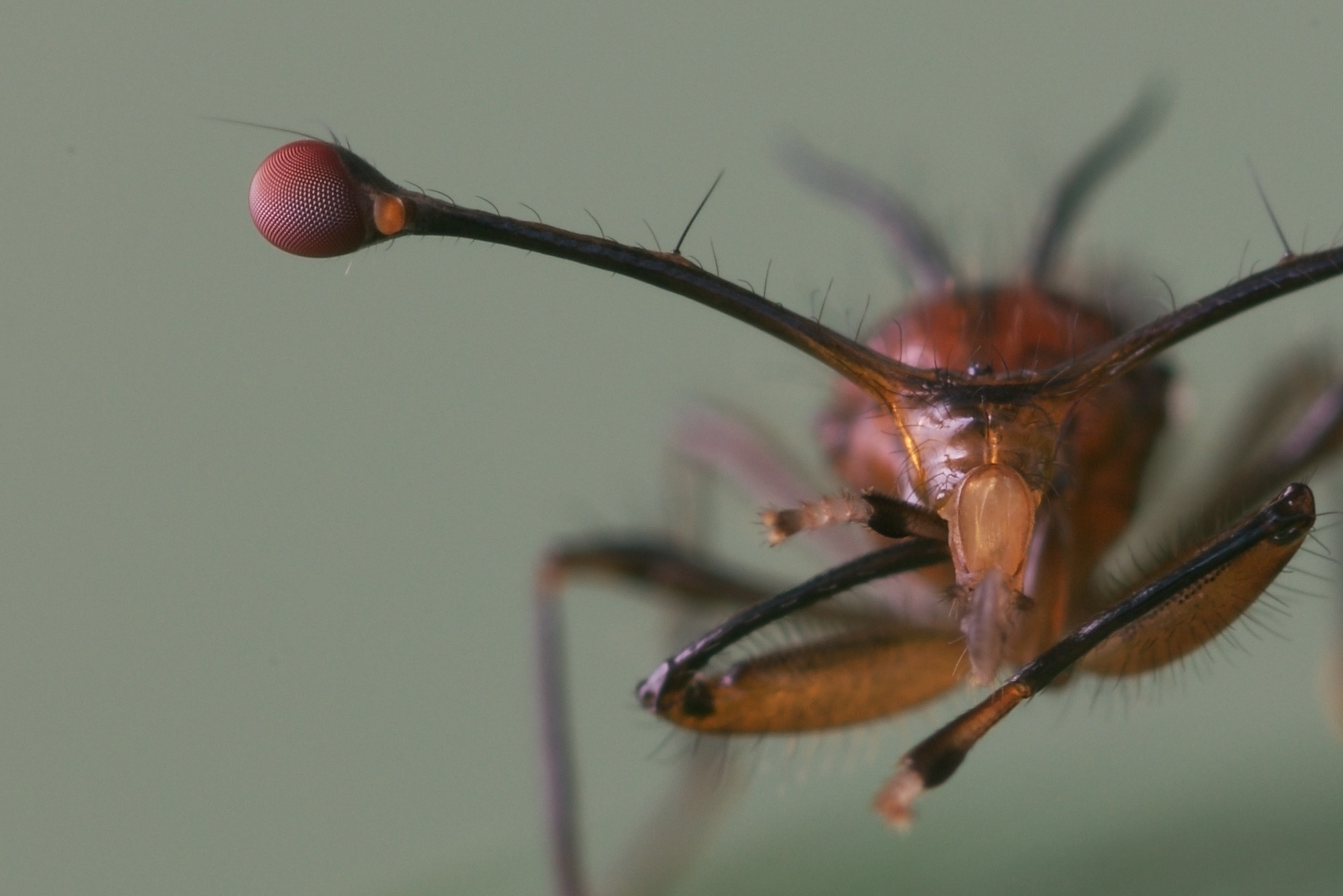
Close-up of a male Teleopsis dalmanni

The extreme morphology exhibited by stalk-eyed flies (especially males) has been studied in an effort to support the hypothesis that exaggerated male traits could evolve through female mate choice and that the selection on male ornaments should cause a correlated response in female preferences. Researchers noted that the flies roosted along stream banks in peninsular Malaysia and that the males with the largest eye spans were accompanied by more females than males with shorter eye spans. From January to October, the researchers counted males and females on 40 root hairs along a single 200-m stretch of stream bank to confirm this observation.

==== Sexual selection experiments ====
Researchers collected stalk-eyed flies and observed their behavior under laboratory conditions. In the lab, each individual was scored for eye spans, body length, age, and fecundity. Observations of pairs of males differing in eye span but matched in body length were conducted to quantify mate choice in the presence and absence of male interactions. Test males with the longest or shortest eye-span to body-length ratios were mated with 25 randomly chosen females. Wilkinson and Reillo then tested female choice in the presence and absence of male competition and in the presence of males with abnormally long and abnormally short eye spans.

Males dispersed themselves, while females clustered in certain areas of the cage. As observed prior to the study, researchers found that the average number of females per male increased with male eye span in field collected aggregations of stalk-eyed flies. Under laboratory conditions, researchers found that female preferences for male characteristics changed as the males sexual characteristics changed. After 13 generations of artificial selection, they found that long eye-span male line females (i.e. females whose fathers had long eye spans) preferred long eye spans in both the selected males and in males that were not bred through artificial selection, while short eye-span male line females (i.e. females whose fathers had short eye spans) found short eye spans to be the most attractive, even over males with long eye spans. Because researchers kept the females separate from males prior to mate selection, the finding supported the hypothesis that the change in female mate choice was genetically based and not learned. Thus, stalk-eyed flies have been able to evolve a sexual trait in males that corresponds directly to traits that affect mating choices made by females.

=== Handicap selection ===
However, the evolution of extreme morphology in male flies and the corresponding evolution of female preference for these characteristics as an effect of sexual selection is only half the picture. Handicap models of sexual selection predict that male sexual ornaments have strong condition-dependent expression, and this allows females to evaluate male genetic quality.

Genetic variation underlies the response to environmental stress, such as variable food quality, of male sexual ornaments, such as the increased eye span, in the stalk-eyed fly. Some male genotypes develop large eye spans under all conditions, whereas other genotypes progressively reduce eye spans as environmental conditions deteriorate. Several nonsexual traits, including female eye span and male and female wing length, also show condition-dependent expression, but their genetic response is entirely explained by scaling with body size. Unlike these characteristics, male eye span still reveals genetic variation in response to environmental stress after accounting for differences in body size. Thus, it could be inferred that these results strongly support the conclusion that female mate choice yields genetic benefits for offspring as eye span acts as a truthful indicator of male fitness. Eye span is, therefore, selected not only on the basis of attractiveness, but also because it demonstrates good genes in mates.

Furthermore, some populations of stalk-eyed fly females carry a meiotic drive gene on their X chromosomes that causes female-biased sex ratios. In these populations, males which carry a gene to suppress X-chromosome meiotic drive have longer eyestalks. Thus, females that mate with these males gain a direct genetic benefit by producing male offspring in a female-biased population. In other words, the gene for long eye-stalks is linked to a gene that makes males sire more male offspring. Alternatively, long stalks may signal fertility, perhaps by encouraging females to use the sperm of a long-stalked male so as to produce more fertile sons.
