= Gloria Cranmer Webster =

Canadian First Nations activist (1931–2023)

Gloria Cranmer Webster OC
- Born: July 4, 1931; Alert Bay
- Died: April 19, 2023 (aged 91)
- Education: University of British Columbia
- Occupations: Activist, writer
- Relatives: George Hunt (great-grandfather) Doug Cranmer (brother)

Gloria Cranmer Webster OC (July 4, 1931 – April 19, 2023) was a Canadian First Nations activist, museum curator, scholar, and writer of Kwakwaka'wakw descent.

== Early life ==
The daughter of Dan Cranmer, chief of the Kwakwaka'wakw – she was born Gloria Cranmer in Alert Bay, British Columbia. She is a great-granddaughter of ethnologist George Hunt and younger sister of renowned carver Doug Cranmer. She moved to Victoria, British Columbia when she was 14 and attended high school there. She graduated with a degree in anthropology from the University of British Columbia in 1956, the first indigenous person to be admitted to that university. She also received an honorary doctorate from UBC in 1995 in law.

She worked as a counsellor at Oakalla Prison in British Columbia for two years, and then worked two years for the John Howard Society. While she was there, she met John Webster. They married, moved to Saskatchewan, and had a daughter in Regina. After 18 months, the family moved to Vancouver, where she worked as a counsellor at the YWCA. The couple had two sons and Webster left that job to raise her family. She returned to work as a counsellor at the Vancouver Indian Centre.

== Career ==
Cranmer Webster was hired as an assistant curator for the Museum of Anthropology at UBC when it was still in the basement of the main university library.

Webster was a driving force behind the establishment of the U’Mista Cultural Centre at Alert Bay, which opened November 1, 1980, which was founded explicitly not to be a museum, because, as an original board member put it, "Indians don't go to museums." Rather, framed as a cultural center its founding constitution outlined its purpose to: first, "collect, preserve and exhibit native artifacts of cultural, artistic and historic value to the Kwakwaka'wakw," second, "promote and foster carving, dancing, ceremonials and other cultural and artistic activities engaged in by the Kwakwaka'wakw," third, "collect, record and make available information and records relating to the language and history of the Kwakwaka'wakw for the use of the Kwakwaka'wakw," fourth, to "promote, build and maintain facilities for carrying out the above aims and objectives," and fifth, "recover from other institutions and individuals artifacts and records of cultural, artistic and historic value to the Kwakwaka'wakw. Cranmer served as its curator for a number of years. She helped retrieve cultural treasures confiscated from her people by Canadian authorities during raids on potlatches during the 1920s.

During her long career, Webster worked on a number of scholarly and creative projects. Webster worked with linguist Dr. J. Powell from UBC to develop a written orthography for the Kwak'wala language. She also wrote books that are used to teach that language, and helped produce, and became a narrator in, the 1973 documentary film The Potlatch: A Strict Law Bids us Dance. She also wrote about traditional land use and foodways, including on smelt and other fishing traditions.

Webster died on April 19, 2023, at the age of 91.

== Awards and honours ==
In 2017, she was named an Officer in the Order of Canada.
