= Blenkinsop =

Blenkinsop or Blenkinsopp is a surname of British origin. Notable people with the surname include:

- Alan Blenkinsop (born 1933), South African cricketer
- Arthur Blenkinsop (1911–1979), British Labour Party politician and MP
- Brian Blenkinsop (1931–2017), South African cricketer
- Christopher Blenkinsop (born 1963), Anglo-German musician
- Ernie Blenkinsop (1902–1969), English football (soccer) player
- Euphemia Blenkinsop (1816–1887), Irish-American religious sister
- George Blenkinsop (1822–1904), pioneer in British Columbia, Canada
- John Blenkinsop (1783–1831), mining engineer and an inventor
- Joseph Blenkinsopp (1927–2022) British-American theologian and Old Testament scholar
- Layton Blenkinsop (1862–1942), British Army officer and veterinary surgeon
- Peter J. Blenkinsop (1818–1896), Irish-American Catholic priest
- Tom Blenkinsop (born 1980), British politician
- Tommy Blenkinsopp (1920–2004), English footballer
- Yvonne Blenkinsop (1938–2022), British safety campaigner

Fictional characters:

- Bertie Blenkinsop, character in The Beano comic, one of the softies and enemy of Dennis the Menace.

== See also ==
- Blenkinsopp Castle
- Blenkinsop Hall
