= George Hunt (ethnologist) =

Tlingit-Canadian linguist and ethnologist (1854–1933)

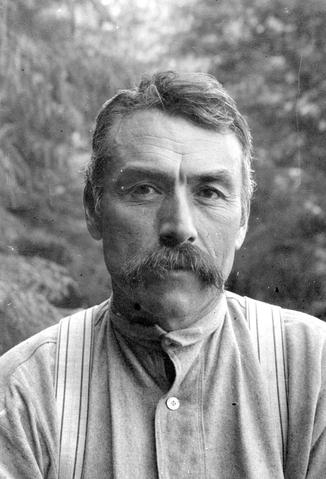
- George Hunt in 1898
- Born: February 14, 1854; Fort Rupert, B.C.
- Died: 1933 (aged 78–79); Fort Rupert, B.C.
- Occupations: Ethnologist, Linguist, Artist
- Parent(s): Robert Hunt, Mary Ebbetts (Anislaga)

George Hunt (February 14, 1854 – 1933) was a Tlingit-Canadian linguist and ethnologist, who consulted for American anthropologist Franz Boas during Boas' fieldwork in coastal British Columbia.

He was Tlingit-English by birth and learned both those languages. Growing up with his parents at Fort Rupert, British Columbia in Kwakwaka'wakw territory, he learned their language and culture as well. Through marriage and adoption he became an expert on the traditions of the Kwakwaka'wakw (then known as "Kwakiutl").

Working with Boas, Hunt collected hundreds of items for an exhibit of the Kwakiutl culture for the World Columbian Exposition of 1893 in Chicago, and accompanied 17 people of the tribe there. Boas taught Hunt to write in Kwakiutl, and the native ethnologist wrote thousands of pages of description of Kwakiutl culture over the next decades.

== Early life and education ==
George Hunt was born in 1854 at Fort Rupert, British Columbia (B.C.), the second of eleven children of Robert Hunt (1828–1893), a Hudson's Bay Company fur trader from Dorset, England, and Mary Ebbetts (Ansnaq, Anislaga, A'naeesla'ga or Anain) (1823–1919), a member of the Raven clan of the Taantakwáan (Tongass) tribe of the Tlingit nation of what is now southeastern Alaska. Mary was the daughter of Chief Keishíshk' Shakes IV and S’eitlin, a Deisheetaan (Gaanax.ádi) woman from Aan goon (Angoon). Robert and Mary were married at the original Fort Simpson, now called Lax-Kw'alaams, on the Nass River not far from the city of Prince Rupert in northwestern British Columbia.

Mary Hunt née Ebbetts (Ansnaq, Anislaga, A'naeesla'ga and Anain), a master Chilkat weaver, was influential among the Kwakwaka'wakw at Tsaxis, Fort Rupert, and introduced concepts of Tlingit hereditary privileges and artistic motifs (reflected on totem poles) into the local society. Hunt learned his mother's language and culture, as well as English and elements of his father's culture. Learning the Kwakwaka'wakw language and the local area from the Kwakwaka'wakw people, he became an interpreter and guide.

His reputation grew. In the early 1880s Hunt served as boatman, guide, and interpreter for Bernard Fillip Jacobsen (brother of Johan Adrian Jacobsen), one of the explorer/ethnologists of the far-ranging Jesup North Pacific Expedition. He may have first met Franz Boas, American anthropologist and organizer of the expedition, at this time as well.

== Ethnologist ==
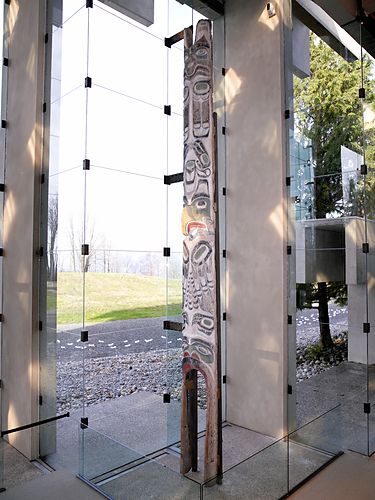
House frontal totem pole carved by George Hunt, for the 1914 motion picture, In the Land of the War Canoes, directed by Edward Curtis. UBC Museum of Anthropology.

Hunt's long collaboration with Franz Boas, an American anthropologist, began in 1886 when Boas first visited the Kwakwaka'wakw as part of the Jesup Expedition. Hunt acted as his interpreter and served to describe and help him understand the culture and its practices. They continued to work together and later Boas taught Hunt to write the Kwak'wala language, to record oral histories and other cultural material. Boas credited Hunt as co-author in Kwakiutl Texts, second series (1906), one of the numerous volumes published into the 1930s in relation to the work of the Jesup expedition.

Boas and Hunt worked to organize and create an exhibit of Kwakiutl and other Native Americans of the Pacific Northwest at the 1893 World Columbian Exposition in Chicago. Hunt collected hundreds of objects for the fair, including a house and a number of carved poles. He travelled to Chicago in April 1893 with a group of 17 Kwakiutl Indians from Fort Rupert, British Columbia. They re-created a village on the fairgrounds, where the Kwakiutl lived during the period of the fair and "demonstrated their ceremonial dances, arts and other traditions. For the 'performers' it was an opportunity to perform songs and dances that had been banned by Canadian government officials. After the Exposition, most of the objects from the exhibit were donated to the Field Museum, where many still can be seen on display today."

Hunt was later instrumental in the purchase of the Yuquot Whalers' Shrine in 1904, an object that has since been of some controversy in recent decades. The Yuquot have tried to reclaim this work.

Over the years Hunt wrote as much as ten thousand pages of ethnological description for Boas. This work covered every aspect of Kwakwaka'wakw culture, including potlatch ceremonies in which Hunt participated. When Boas received texts collected from other speakers, he sent the transcriptions to Hunt to look over, remarking in a 1931 letter, "In some cases, I can guess what is wrong but I had rather have you correct it than use my own uncertain knowledge of Kwakiutl."

Hunt's manuscripts are held by the Rare Book & Manuscript Library, Columbia University, NY. The Hunt/Boas correspondence is found at the American Philosophical Society in Philadelphia.

== Legacy ==
In the late 19th and early 20th century wealthy people began to collect Pacific Northwest Indian art and totem poles. Chicago businessman James L. Kraft, the founder of Kraft Inc., donated a Kwakiutl totem pole to the city of Chicago, and it was installed in a waterfront park in 1929. Forty feet high, it was carved in traditional fashion from a single cedar pole. After many decades it was deteriorating. Kraft, Inc. commissioned a replacement and the original pole was sent to British Columbia for study and preservation in 1985, as its historical and artistic value was considerable.

George Hunt's descendant Tony Hunt, a Kwakwaka'wakw hereditary chief and artist, in 1986 carved a replacement totem pole, called Kwanusila, replicating the original design and colors. It was installed at the lakeside park. Hunt's work is also held by the St. Louis Art Museum, the Fine Arts Museums of San Francisco and Chicago's Field Museum, in addition to private collectors.

George Hunt's descendants also include Dr. Gloria Cranmer-Webster and the filmmaker Barbara Cranmer. In addition, the Hunt dynasty of traditional Northwest Coast artists includes Henry Hunt, his sons Tony, Stanley C. Hunt, and Richard Hunt; their second cousin, Calvin Hunt; and Corrine Hunt. She designed all of the gold, silver and bronze medals awarded at the 2010 Vancouver Winter Olympics and Paralympic games.

In 1986, members of the Boas and Hunt families held a "reunion" at Tsaxis (Fort Rupert). In 1995, the Hunt family hosted a potlatch to celebrate the Long House: Kwakwaka'wakw Big House House of the Chiefs Kanada, Turtle Island. in Tsaxis, Fort Rupert. Master carver Tony Hunt Sr headed up the Gudzi Community Big House. The late Henry Hunt Sr shared his skill and oversaw the carving of the three Sisiutl Heads and Frogs on Tongues. Tony Hunt Jr, Tommy Hunt Jr., Steven Hunt, George Jr Hunt carved the Double-Headed Serpent and Frogs on Tongues with Uncle Henry Hunt Sr.

== Sources ==
- Barbeau, Marius (1950) Totem Poles. 2 vols. (Anthropology Series 30, National Museum of Canada Bulletin 119.) Ottawa: National Museum of Canada.
- Berman, Judith (1994) "George Hunt and the Kwak'wala Texts," Anthropological Linguistics Vol. 36, no. 4 (Winter 1994): 483-514.
- Blackmore, Erin (2019) "An anthropology pioneer’s complicated legacy about a Native Canadian tribe." The Washington Post, April 27, 2019
- Boas, Franz, and George Hunt (1905) Kwakiutl Texts. (Publications of the Jesup North Pacific Expedition, vol. 3.) Leiden, Netherlands.
- Boas, Franz, and George Hunt (1906) Kwakiutl Texts—Second Series. (Publications of the Jesup North Pacific Expedition, vol. 10). Leiden, Netherlands.
- Codere, Helen (1966) "Introduction." In: Franz Boas, Kwakiutl Ethnography,pp. xi-xxxii. Chicago: University of Chicago Press.
- Henderson, Heidi (2019) "Anislaga / Ansnaq / Mary Ebbetts: Master Chilkat Weaver" Archea, Vancouver, Jun 6, 2019
- Hunt, Ross (2007) "The Hunt Family's Trip to West Germany to Attend the Bundesgarten Show," Anthropology News, vol. 48, no. 2, pp. 20–21.
- Miller, Tom (2010) "Medals sport a familiar look," Ketchikan Daily News, Feb. 27, 2010, page 1.4
- Travis (1946) "Reminiscences of Fort Rupert, Kwakiutls Fort Rupert" The Beaver, Winnipeg, Dec 1946, page 651-657
