= Thomas Blenkinsop =

Thomas Blenkinsop may refer to:

- Thomas Blenkinsop (MP) for Westmorland (UK Parliament constituency)
- Tom Blenkinsop (born 1980), English politician

== See also ==
- Tommy Blenkinsopp (1920–2004), English footballer (Middlesbrough FC)
