= Kwakiutl First Nation =

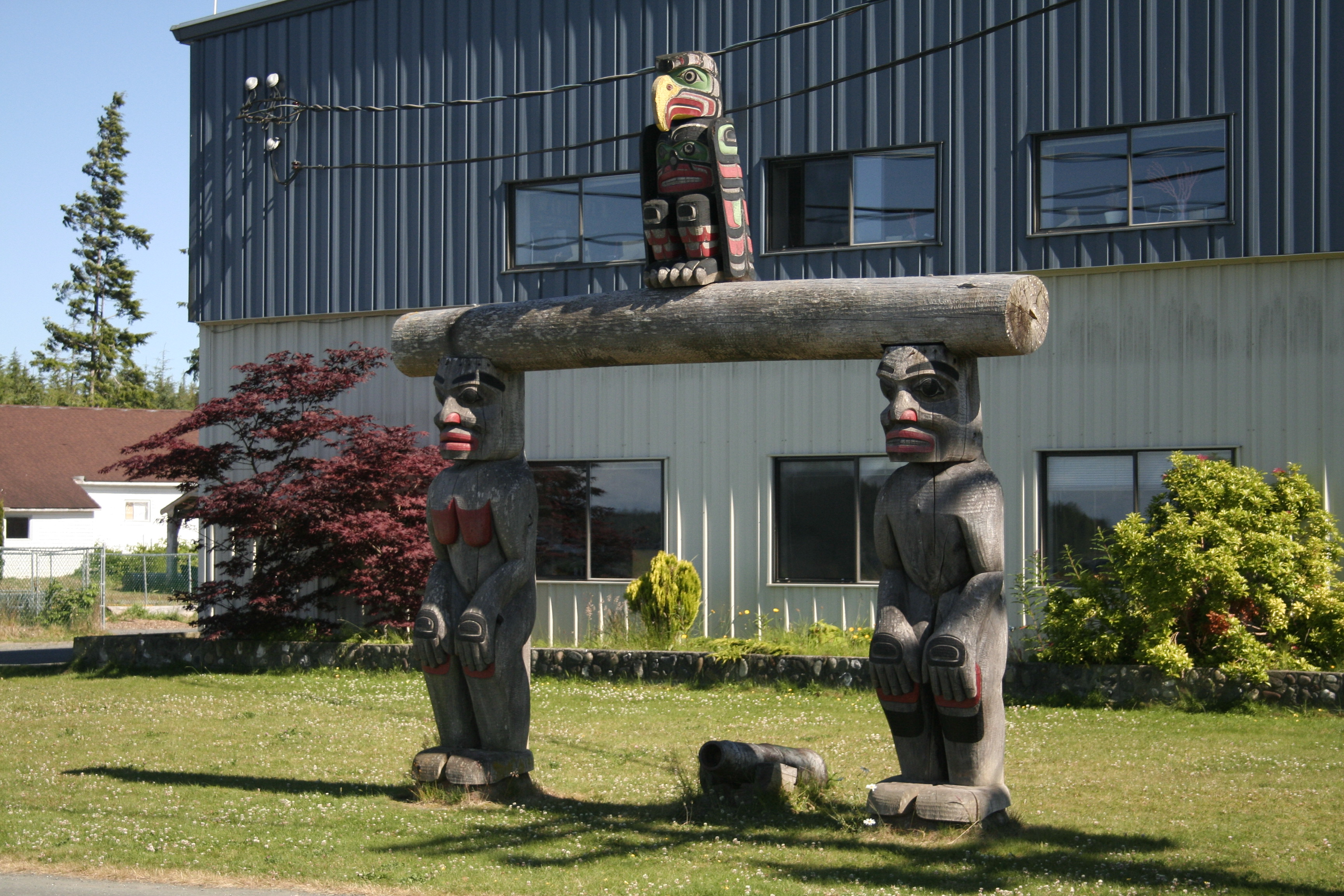
A welcome figure in front of U’gwamalis Hall, headquarters of the Kwakiutl First Nation in Fort Rupert.

The Kwakiutl First Nation is a First Nations government based on northern Vancouver Island in British Columbia, Canada, focused on the community of Port Hardy, British Columbia in the Queen Charlotte Strait region, and also known as the Fort Rupert Band, known in traditional Kwakwaka'wakw terms as the Kwagu'ł or Kwagyewlth. It is a member of the Kwakiutl District Council. It is currently in stage 4 of the British Columbia Treaty Process, having submitted a statement of intent in 1997.

The chief of the Kwakiutl is Councillor Grace Wilson. There are approximately 835 members of the Kwakiutl nation.

== History ==
In 1851, the ancestors of the Kwakiutl entered into treaties with James Douglas, then acting as agent for the Hudson's Bay Company, so that the company could gain access to coal deposits on the northeast coast of Vancouver Island. However the nation asserts that the treaty was violated and has been in litigation with the province of British Columbia for a number of years.

== See also ==
- Port Hardy, British Columbia
- Fort Rupert, British Columbia
- Kwakwaka'wakw
- Kwak'wala (language)

=== External links ===
- Kwakiutl Band Council
