= Doug Cranmer =

Kwakwaka'wakw carver and artist (1927–2006)

Doug Cranmer (Kesu')
- Born: January 27, 1927; Alert Bay, British Columbia, Canada
- Died: November 6, 2006 (aged 79); Alert Bay, BC, Canada
- Known for: Carver, Painter
- Movement: Northwest Coast art

Doug Cranmer (1927–2006), also known as Pal'nakwala Wakas and Kesu', was a Kwakwaka'wakw carver and artist as well as a 'Namgis chief. Cranmer was a significant figure in the Northwest Coast art movement, both in its traditional form and in a modern contemporary form that he created and developed.

== Personal life ==
Cranmer was born in January 18, 1927 in Alert Bay, British Columbia and given the Kwakwaka'wakw name "Kesu'" ("wealth being carved") at the age of ten. Cranmer inherited the position of 'Namgis chief from his father, taking the hereditary name of Pal’nakwala Wakas, meaning "great river of overflowing wealth".

Cranmer died on November 6, 2006 in Alert Bay.

== Professional life ==
Cranmer began drawing and carving on his own early in life, but was schooled in the style and traditions of Kwakwaka'wakw art by Mungo Martin ("Nakapenkem"). Cranmer's early working life was spent logging and fishing. It was not until the 1950s that Cranmer quit work in the logging and fishing industry to work as a carver, when he was invited by Haida artist Bill Reid to assist him in the creation of Haida-style houses and totem poles under a commission from the Museum of Anthropology at the University of British Columbia. As a result of his participation in Reid's project, Cranmer's training and experience expanded to include styles of other Northwest Coast traditions, such as the Tsimshian, Tlingit, Heiltsuk, and Haida.

By the 1960s, Cranmer had established himself as an independent Northwest Coast artist in his own right. In 1962, in partnership with Alfred Scow and Richard Bird, Cranmer established a commercial gallery in Vancouver called "The Talking Stick". The Talking Stick was one of the first Aboriginal studios of its kind. The partners wound up the business in 1967, as Cranmer's growing reputation and large-scale commissions meant he had less time to devote to creating works for The Talking Stick.

In 1967, the Vancouver Art Gallery included three works by Cranmer as part of what was the first exhibition of aboriginal art in Canada presented on an equal status as that of western art. Cranmer was later commissioned to create the doors and totem poles for the B.C. pavilion at Expo '70.

While trained in the traditional art forms, Cranmer was an innovator who felt free to break with the established rules of his artform. Cranmer has been described by others as an artist and master, but he himself eschewed such labels, believing that the use of such terms would make him complacent in his work. Cranmer preferred to describe himself as a "whittler and doodler". By the 1970s, Cranmer had worked with new techniques (such as silkscreening), materials (such as mahogany), and forms that had not been applied previously to Northwest Coast art. Cranmer also employed modern tools previously not used in Northwest Coast art, such as chainsaws and lathes. Cranmer was the first to create what is now a ubiquitous staple of Northwest Coast art, the "loon bowl". He often experimented with new styles, such as an attempt to design an abstract totem pole in the round.

Cranmer was also a teacher, instructing other First Nations artists at a studio in Alert Bay and, later, at Hazelton, British Columbia and the Museum of Vancouver (formerly the Vancouver Centennial Museum).
