= Calvin Hunt (artist) =

Canadian artist (born 1956)

- Born: 1956 (age 69–70); Fort Rupert, British Columbia, Canada
- Known for: Woodcarver

Calvin Hunt RCA (born 1956, Kwakiutl) is a Canadian First Nations artist from Fort Rupert, British Columbia. The Kwakiutl are part of the larger nation Kwakwaka'wakw.

He is a descendant of the renowned Tlingit ethnologist George Hunt. He was apprenticed as a teenager to his second cousin Tony Hunt, an artist and carver.

He is a woodcarver and owns his own gallery. He was made a member of the Royal Canadian Academy of Arts.

== Sources ==
- Hunt, Ross (2007) "The Hunt Family's Trip to West Germany to Attend the Bundesgarten Show." Anthropology News, vol. 48, no. 2, pp. 20–21.
- Macnair, Peter L., Alan L. Hoover, and Kevin Neary (1984) The Legacy: Tradition and Innovation in Northwest Coast Indian Art. Vancouver, B.C.: Douglas & McIntyre.
