= U'mista Cultural Society =

Kwakwaka'wakw cultural organization and museum in Alert Bay, British Columbia

- U'mista
- Formation: March 22, 1974; 52 years ago
- Type: Cultural society; museum operator
- Headquarters: Alert Bay, British Columbia, Canada
- Region served: Kwakwaka'wakw communities
- Official language: Kwakʼwala
- Website: www.umista.ca

U'mista Cultural Society is a Kwakwaka'wakw cultural organization based in Alert Bay, British Columbia, Canada, and the operator of the U'mista Cultural Centre. The society was founded in 1974 and is associated with the repatriation, care, and exhibition of the Potlatch Collection—ceremonial regalia confiscated during the Canadian government's potlatch ban.

The name U'mista is a Kwakʼwala term used to describe the return of something important that had been taken away, and was adopted in connection with the return of confiscated potlatch regalia to the community.

== History ==
U'mista Cultural Society was incorporated under the British Columbia Societies Act on 22 March 1974. The Canadian Encyclopedia describes the society as working to ensure the survival of Kwakwaka'wakw cultural heritage and notes its location in Alert Bay.

The society is closely linked to repatriation efforts for the Potlatch Collection, which includes regalia confiscated during enforcement of the potlatch ban; the Canadian Museum for Human Rights notes that officials confiscated hundreds of items (reporting 750) that were dispersed among museums in Canada and the United States. U'mista's collection history describes repatriation negotiations with national institutions, including conditions requiring a dedicated facility to house and care for returned materials.

The U'mista Cultural Centre opened on 1 November 1980 in Alert Bay to house part of the returned Potlatch Collection. The facility and repatriation arrangements are frequently discussed in academic and policy literature as an early, influential example of negotiated repatriation and community-based care for cultural belongings.

== U'mista Cultural Centre and collections ==
The U'mista Cultural Centre is a museum and cultural facility in Alert Bay operated by the society. According to the society, the centre's permanent collection focuses on the Potlatch Collection, alongside exhibits on Kwakwaka'wakw history and cultural knowledge. A Virtual Museum of Canada project associated with U'mista describes the Potlatch Collection as having been taken during the potlatch ban and later returned to be held at U'mista.

== Repatriation work ==
U'mista is widely cited in discussions of repatriation and museum policy. In describing the broader dispersal of confiscated regalia, the Canadian Museum for Human Rights notes that items entered multiple major institutions and that community-led advocacy sought their return. Academic work has described subsequent returns from institutions including the Royal Ontario Museum and the National Museum of the American Indian, and places U'mista within longer-term, multi-institution repatriation efforts connected to the Potlatch Collection.

== See also ==
- Repatriation (cultural heritage)
