= Quesalid =

Quesalid was a Kwakwaka'wakw First Nations shaman who lived on Vancouver Island, Canada. He wrote an autobiography in Kwak'wala, the Kwakiutl language, discovered by Franz Boas and well known by anthropologists, in which he recounted his experiences as a shaman from an authentic view.

Quesalid started to be interested in shamanism because he was suspicious that shamanism was not true. Then, he entered a "shamanism school," and learned how to play the role. But he continued, became a well known shaman, and continued to report his experience. A summary of his autobiography indicates that he moved from a sceptical position to a "social view" of shamanism—that shamanic work is psychology, and about the faith of the sick people, and the faith of the community.

== Sources ==
- Lévi-Strauss, Claude, Le Sorcier et sa magie, 1949, in "Anthropologie structurale", Paris, 1958. Chap. IX: Le Sorcier et sa Magie.
