= Sonny Assu =

Ligwilda'xw Kwakwaka'wakw contemporary artist

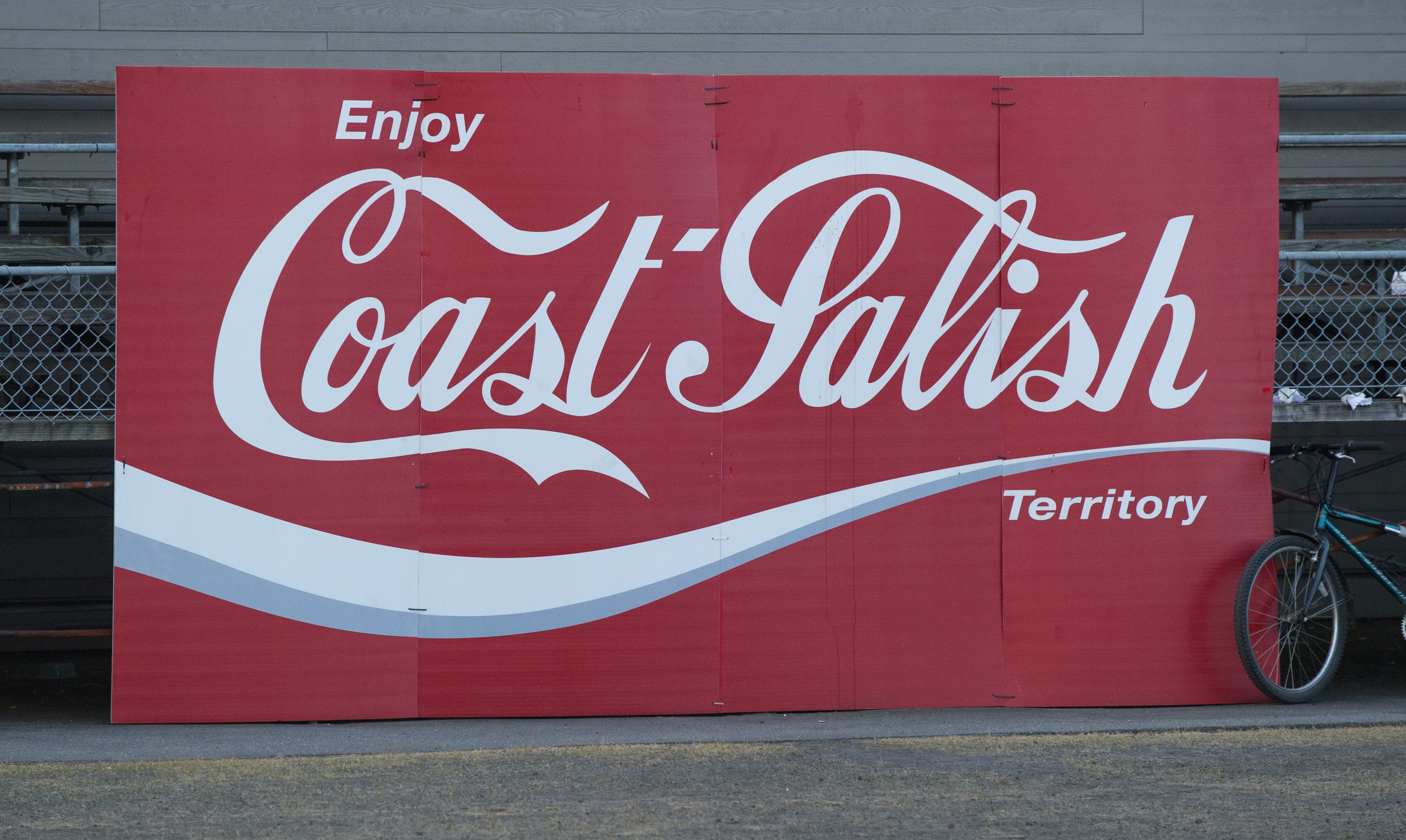
- Born: May 9, 1975; Richmond, British Columbia, Canada
- Education: Emily Carr University of Art and Design
- Known for: painter, printmaker, installation artist, sculptor
- Movement: Kwakwaka'wakw art
- Website: http://sonnyassu.com

Sonny Assu (born 1975 in Richmond, British Columbia) is a Canadian contemporary artist. Assu's paintings, sculptures, prints, installations, and interventions are all infused with his wry humour which is a tool to open the conversation around his themes of predilections: consumerism, colonization and imperialism.

== Career ==
Assu was given a suburban upbringing by his grandparents in North Delta, British Columbia, and didn't learn of his own Kwakwaka'wakw heritage until he was eight years old. He studied painting at Kwantlen College and then at the Emily Carr University of Art and Design, where he combined his interests in pop art with traditional drum-making and cedar bark weaving.

Assu was long-listed for the Sobey Art Award in 2012, 2013, and 2015. In 2017 he was the recipient of a REVEAL Indigenous Art Award / Prix en art autochtone from the Hnatyshyn Foundation.

Assu is an author in the graphic novel anthology This Place: 150 Years Retold. His story, 'Tilted Ground,' follows Assu's great-great-grandfather as well as the Potlatch Ban in Canada.

== Art ==
Assu series Breakfast series, Personal Totem series, and Urban Totem series all reflect on how consumer items and icons of pop culture define individual lineage and relate to the idea of totemic representation. In his 2006 Breakfast series, Assu appropriates the form of the cereal box and subverses it with commentaries on First Nations issues such as the environment, treaty rights and land claims.

== Selected exhibitions ==
- Ready Player Two: Sonny Assu and Brendan Tang, organized and circulated by The Reach Gallery Museum, Abbotsford (2017), and touring to the Yukon Art Centre, Whitehorse (2018), Touchstones Nelson Museum of Art & History, (2018), Niagara Artists’ Centre, St. Catherines (2018), the Art Gallery of York University, Toronto (2019), and Illingworth Kerr Gallery, Calgary (2020).
- We Come to Witness: Sonny Assu in Dialogue with Emily Carr, Vancouver Art Gallery (2016–17)
- The Paradise Syndrome (solo), Malaspina Printmakers, Vancouver, BC (2016)
- Home Coming (solo), Campbell River Art Gallery, Campbell River, BC (2016)
- 1UP (solo), Surrey Art Gallery Urban Screen (2016)
- Continuum (solo), Thunder Bay Art Gallery, Thunder Bay, Ontario (2015)

== Public collections ==
A work of Assu spoofing the Coca-Cola logo and replacing it by the words "Enjoy Coast-Salish Territory" is in the collection of the Museum of Anthropology at UBC. He also has works in the collection of the National Gallery of Canada, the Vancouver Art Gallery, Seattle Art Museum, the Audain Art Museum, Whistler, BC, and Burnaby Art Gallery, amongst others.
