= Kwaguʼł =

Kwakwakaʼwakw tribe

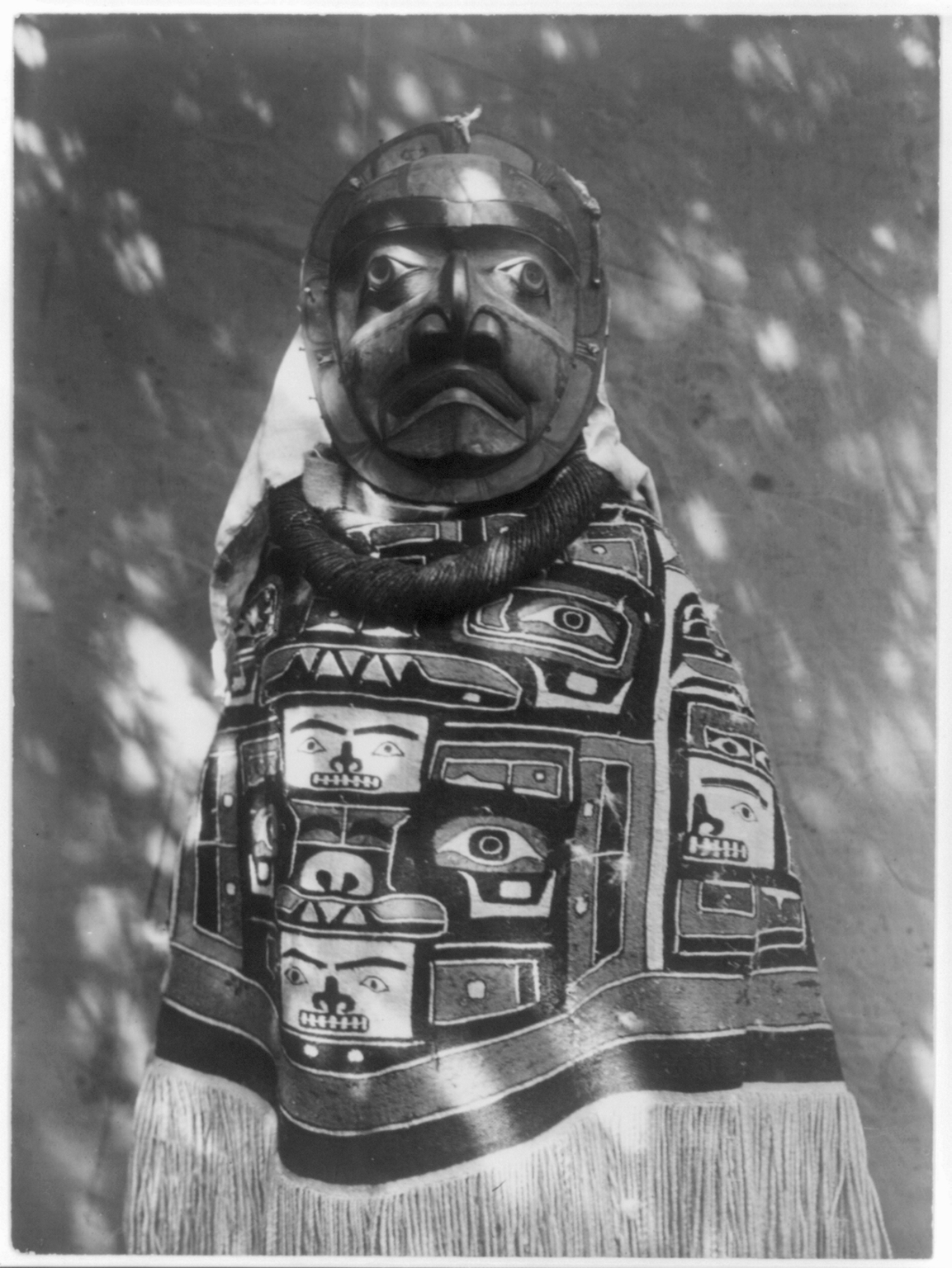
Kwaguʼł woman wearing a fringed Chilkat blanket (worn backwards), a hamatsa neckring and mask representing a deceased relative who had been a shaman. Photograph by Edward S. Curtis c. 1883.

Kwaguʼł are a Kwakwakaʼwakw tribe of the Indigenous peoples of the Pacific Northwest Coast from central British Columbia, on northern Vancouver Island. Their main community is called Tsax̱is or Fort Rupert. The ancestral language is Kwakʼwala, a language that is a part of the Wakashan language group. In their language, Kwaguʼł translates to Smoke-Around-the-World referring to the smoke that exited from the many bighouses in their villages.

The band government of the Kwaguʼł is the Kwakiutl First Nation. The anglicization "Kwakiutl" and other forms of this group's name was for a long time used to describe all the Kwakwakaʼwakw peoples, but properly refers only to this group. The term "Kwakiutl" is also used by the Laich-kwil-tach or Lekwiltok (Euclataws or Yucultas, historically) who migrated from the vicinity of what would become Fort Rupert to what is now the City of Campbell River and adjoining islands at the start of the 19th century; they identify as the Southern Kwakiutl.

== Notable members ==
- Artist Mungo Martin and his descendants, many of whom are also prominent artists.
- Tony Hunt, chief of the Kwaguʼł and a carver/sculptor
- Hawinipologwa or Qualicum Annie as she is better known as, was Walas Kwagulh, and she likely carried the killer whale crest.
