= Transformation mask =

Type of mask

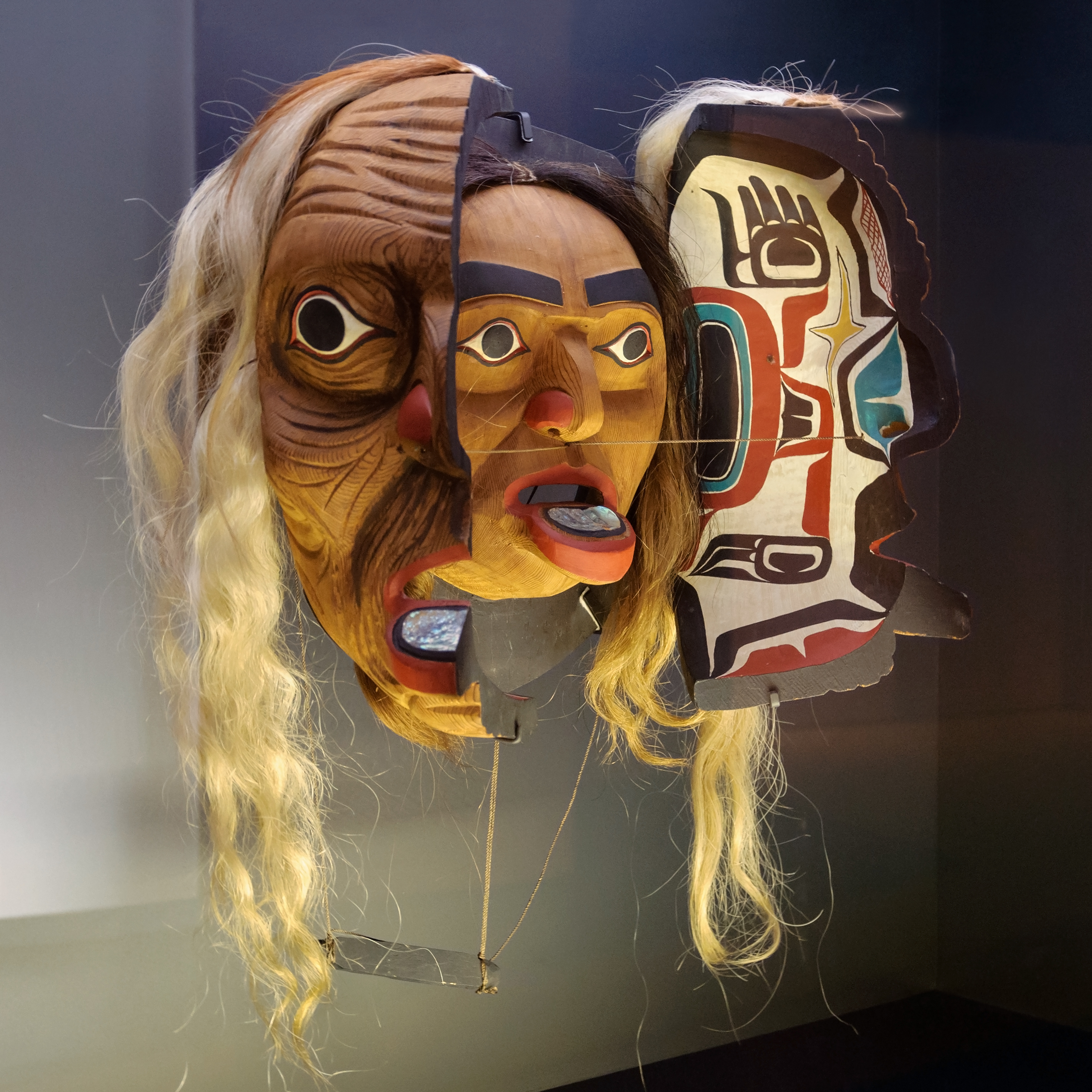
Transformation Mask (Kwakwaka'wakw: British Columbia, Canada) In the collection of the Peabody Museum of Archaeology and Ethnology, Cambridge, Massachusetts, here presented in an exhibition in Paris.

A transformation mask, also known as an opening mask, is a type of mask used by indigenous people of the Northwest Coast of North America and Alaska in ritual dances. These masks usually depict an outer, animal visage, which the performer can open by pulling a string to reveal an inner human face carved in wood to symbolize the wearer moving from the natural world to a supernatural realm. Northwest coast peoples generally use them in potlatches to illustrate myths, while they are used by Alaska natives for shamanic rituals.

== Transformation ==
Transformation masks are used to embody the act of transforming. These transformations usually portray an animal becoming another animal or an animal transforming into a fabled creature.

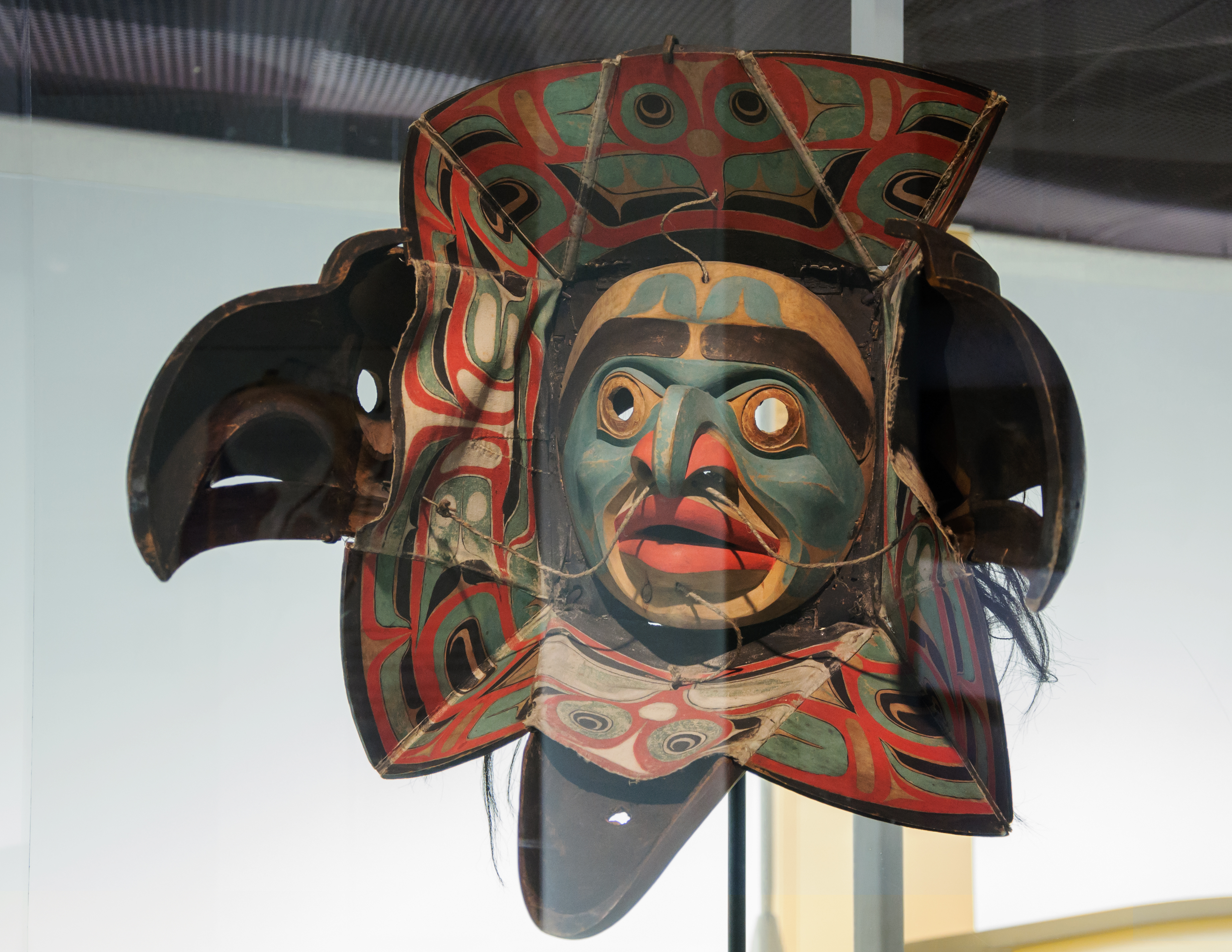
Nuxalk transformation mask, 19th century

== Myths and animals ==
During ceremonies and rituals, the transformation masks would sometimes be used to transform indigenous people of the Northwest Coast into animals or mythic creatures. According to native legends, transformation was often related to supernatural creatures such as tricksters—typically a god or goddess who uses their knowledge to cause chaos among humans.

== Potlatches and ceremonies ==
As a way of honouring the natural milestones of Native American life, the Kwakwaka'wakw people, a Native American tribe that originates in the Pacific Northwest Coast, celebrates Potlatch. Potlatch is a tradition that includes wearing transformation masks, singing, and dancing. The ceremony is meant to celebrate the rituals of name-giving, inducting a new chief of the tribe, and honoring a death or marriage.

Potlatch ceremonies were used to establish social order, distribute resources and convey information to the clan. Typically, these masks were carved by master carvers of the First Nations of the Pacific Northwest Coastal region.

The word "Potlatch" comes from the Chinook word "to give". Potlatch ceremonies were conducted in a big community space called the Big House. Frequently, these ceremonies involve the telling of the origin story of the first Nations' group or clan.

Settlers, missionaries and the Canadian government sought to end the Potlatch because they wanted the indigenous people to assimilate to Anglo-Canadian beliefs and customs. In 1884, the Canadian government started a ban on Potlatch ceremonies that lasted until 1969.

== Materials and design ==
To make the masks, natural, organic materials are used such as red cedar bark and other types of wood that are commonly used by these tribes to construct buildings and other structures. The masks are usually made using a color palette of earthy tones such as red, blue, green, and black, though other colors are sometimes used as well. The colors are made by using plants and minerals that were available to them in their natural surroundings.

== Modern transformation masks ==
While very little seems to be known about the original masks and how they were used, one artist, Shawn Hunt, wanted to recreate a mask with the assistance of modern technology. Transformation Mask, a 3D-printed, meter-long replica of the Raven was released in 2018 with the help of Microsoft Vancouver. The wearer of the mask experiences it opening and closing, along with ambient light and sound coupled with holographics.

== Seattle Seahawks logo ==
A Kwakwaka'wakw eagle mask, photographed for the 1950 book Art of the Northwest Coast Indians by Robert Bruce Inverarity, was the inspiration for the logo of the Seattle Seahawks of the National Football League. The logo, unveiled in 1975, was designed by the league and depicts the closed mask with some modifications. The original mask, estimated to have been created in the 1860s or 1870s, was discovered on the northeast side of Vancouver Island. It was later part of an estate donated to the Hudson Museum at the University of Maine. Ahead of the Seahawks' appearance in Super Bowl XLVIII in 2014, the Burke Museum in Seattle published a blog post to search for the then-missing mask; the Hudson Museum responded and offered to send the mask to the Burke Museum. After a fundraising campaign, the mask was exhibited at the Burke Museum from November 2014 to July 2015.

The Seahawks logo has been the subject of several redesigns by other artists. Marvin Oliver, a Quinault artist, redesigned the logo in 1975 to more closely adhere to formline design principles.

== Gallery ==
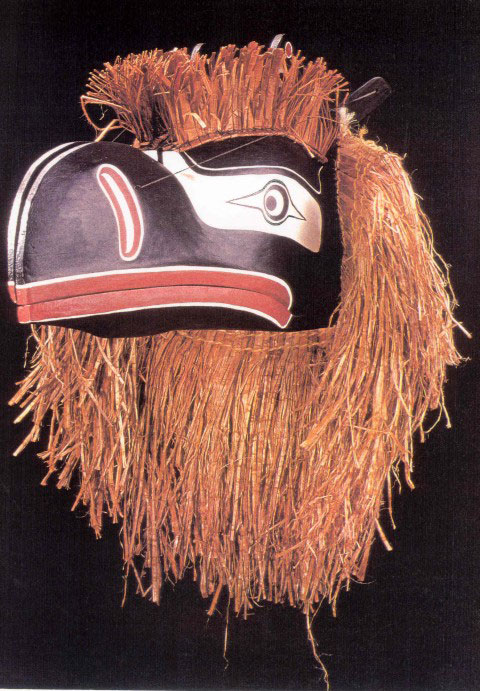
Raven/Sisutl transformation mask by Oscar Matilpi, Kwakwaka'wakw Nation, 1997. In the permanent collection of The Children's Museum of Indianapolis

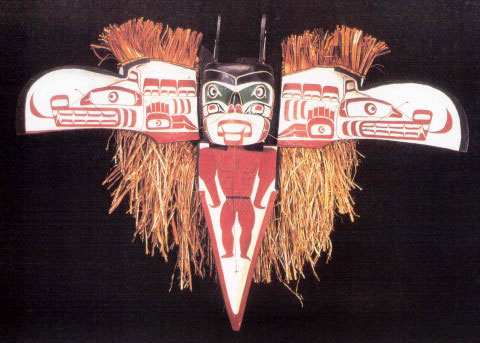
The same Raven/Sisutl transformation mask, open, by Oscar Matilpi, Kwakwaka'wakw Nation, 1996. In the permanent collection of The Children's Museum of Indianapolis

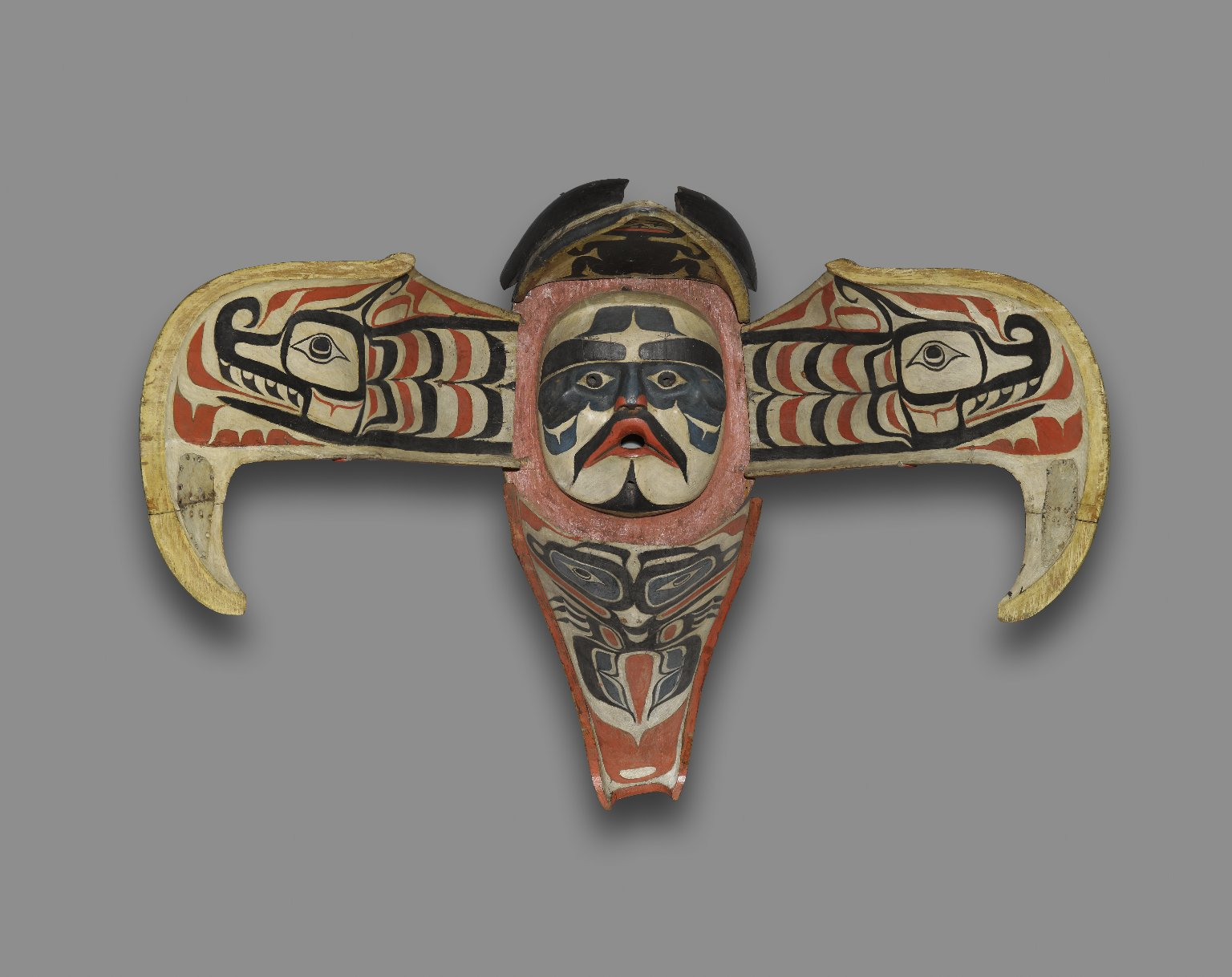
'Namgis artist (of the Kwakwaka'wakw), Thunderbird Mask open, 19th c., from Alert Bay, Vancouver Island, British Columbia, Canada (Located at the Brooklyn Museum)

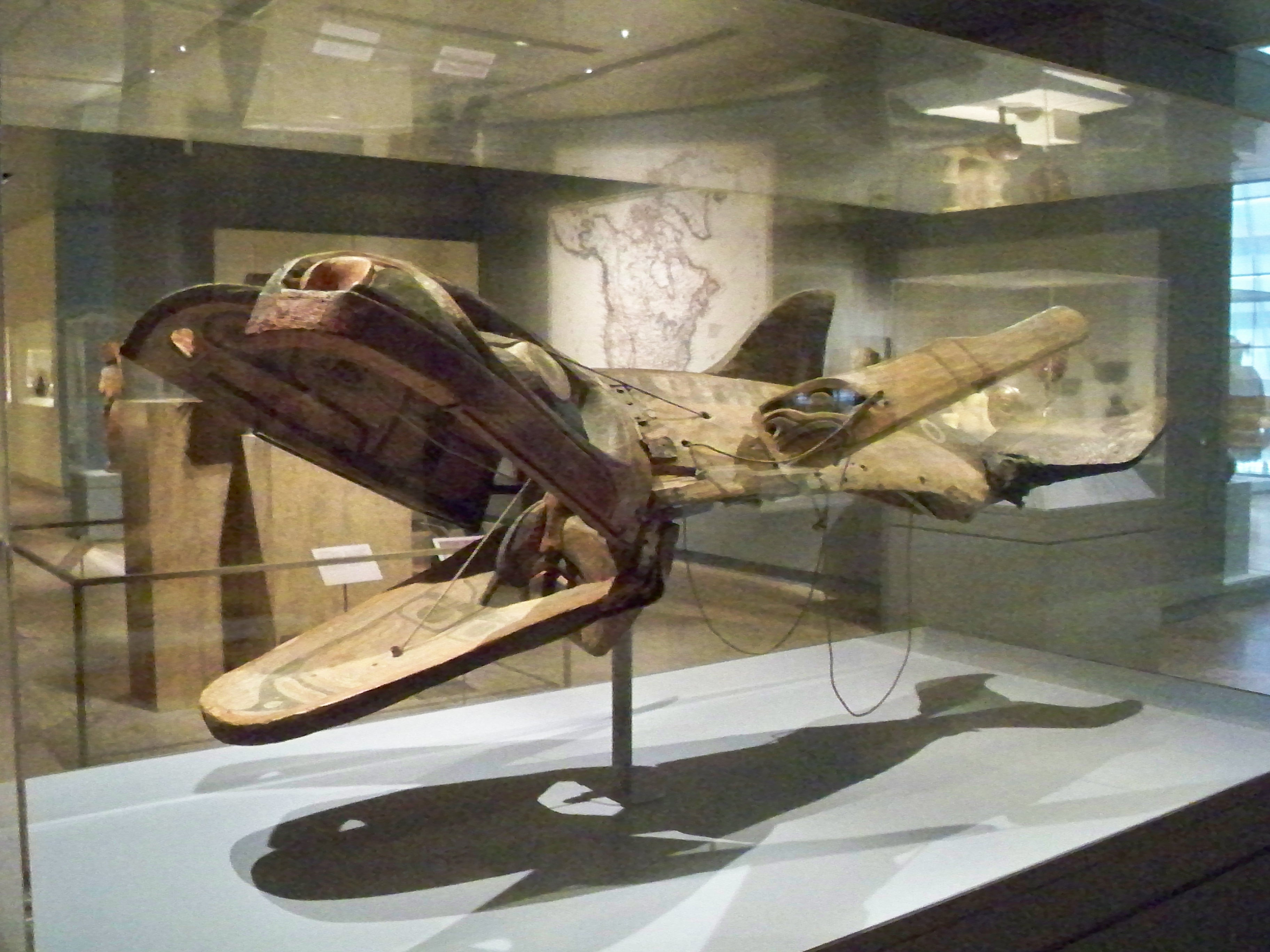
Kwakwaka'wakw artist, Whale Mask, 19th c., from Alert Bay, Vancouver Island, British Columbia, Canada (Located at The Metropolitan Museum of Art)

== See also ==
- Masks among Eskimo peoples
