= James Sewid =

Canadian writer and Kwakwaka'wakw leader(1913–1988)

- Born: December 31, 1913
- Died: May 18, 1988 (aged 74)
- Awards: Order of Canada

James Sewid, OC (December 31, 1913 – May 18, 1988) was a Canadian fisherman, author and former Chief councillor of the Kwakwaka'wakw at Alert Bay, British Columbia.

In 1969, he published his autobiography Guests Never Leave Hungry: The Autobiography of James Sewid, a Kwakiutl Indian, edited by James P. Spradley. The book was reprinted in 1995, several years after Sewid's death.

In 1971, he was made an Officer of the Order of Canada "for his contributions to the welfare of his people and for fostering an appreciation of their cultural heritage".
