= Alan Blenkinsop =

South African cricketer (born 1933)

Personal information
- Born: 17 January 1933 (age 93); Port Elizabeth, South Africa
- Source: Cricinfo, 17 December 2020

Alan Blenkinsop (born 17 January 1933) is a South African cricketer. He played in nine first-class matches from 1951/52 to 1956/57.
