= Jan Hare =

Anishinaabe scholar and educator

- Born: 1965 (age 60–61); Manitoulin District, Ontario, Canada

Academic background
- Education: BASc, University of Guelph; BEd, Nipissing University; M.A., University of Western Ontario; Ph.D., 2001, University of British Columbia
- Thesis: Aboriginal literacy: making meaning across three generations in an Anishinaabe community (2001)

Jan Hare (born 1965) is an Anishinaabe scholar and educator. She is an associate professor of Language and Literacy Education and Professor of Indigenous Education in Teacher Education at the University of British Columbia. Hare is also a Tier 1 Canada Research Chair in Indigenous Pedagogy.

== Early life and education ==
Hare was born in 1965 in the M'Chigeeng First Nation band in Northern Ontario to former Chief Joseph Hare. She completed her Bachelor of Applied Science degree in child studies at the University of Guelph and her Bachelor of Education degree at Nipissing University. Following her undergraduate studies, Hare earned her Master of Arts degree at the University of Western Ontario before leaving her home province to complete her PhD at the University of British Columbia (UBC).

== Career ==
Following her PhD, Hare accepted a faculty appointment in Language and Literacy Education at UBC where she worked alongside provincial Aboriginal early learning organizations. She also oversaw the development of a Language Immersion in Early Learning certificate program and the nationally funded Aboriginal Family and Community Literacy Curriculum. She took a sabbatical from UBC during the 2009–10 academic year during which she wrote Indigenous knowledge and young indigenous children's literacy learning. In 2013, Hare was appointed UBC's inaugural Professorship in Indigenous Education for Teacher Education. In this new role, she became the principal investigator of a Massive Open Online Course (MOOC) titled "Reconciliation through Indigenous Education." The aim of this course was to teach educators how to modify their teaching practices and school programs to integrate Indigenous knowledge and pedagogies into the curriculum. As a result of this course and her workshops, Hare was recognized with the 2015 Murray Elliott Award for Outstanding Contributions to the Teacher Education Program. In 2016, Hare was appointed the Associate Dean of Indigenous Education at UBC. She was also nominated for the YWCA's 2017 Women of Distinction Awards in the category of Education, Training & Development.

In 2020, Hare was named a Tier 1 Canada Research Chair in Indigenous Pedagogy. She also received funding to support her co-led project (Re)Imagining Indigenous-Centred UBC Campus Recreation to "decolonize campus space and advance and support Indigenous self-determination through socially and culturally sustainable campus recreation." Later in July 2021, Hare replaced Blye Frank and assumed Dean pro tem of the UBC Faculty of Education, which was extended into 2022. Following her extension, Hare received a Spencer Foundation grant for her Indigenous-led Teacher Education in Global and Local Contexts: Setting Research Priorities and New Directions project. She was also appointed to the rank of Full professor.

== Selected publications ==
- Good Intentions Gone Awry: Emma Crosby and the Methodist Mission on the Northwest Coast (2006)
- Learning, Knowing, Sharing: Celebrating Successes in K-12 Aboriginal Education in British Columbia (2017)
- Trickster Comes to Teacher Education (2021)
