= Potlatch ban =

Ban on indigenous culture by the government of Canada

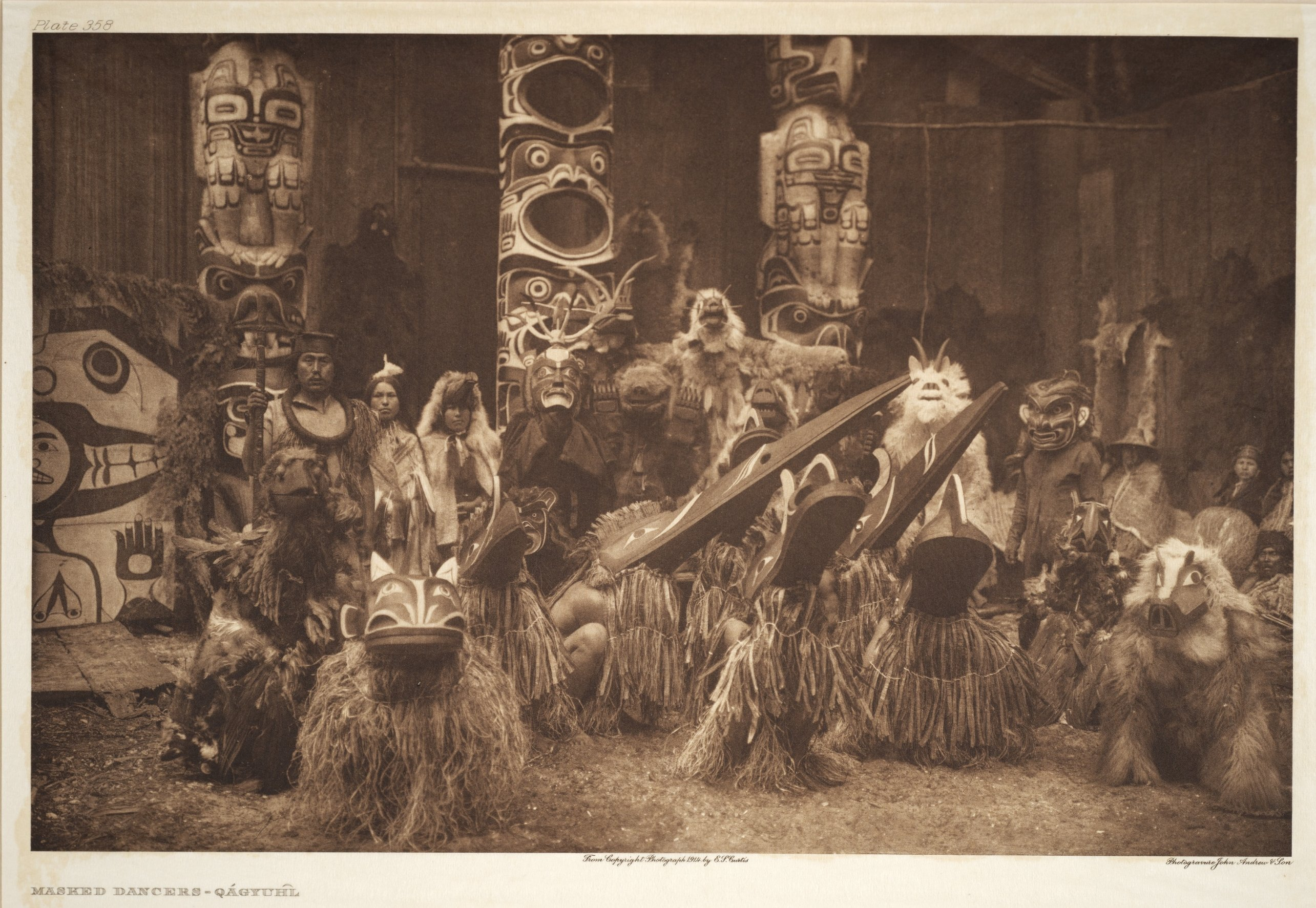
Example of masks of Kwakwaka'wakw potlatch that were seized under Potlatch ban

The potlatch ban was legislation forbidding the practice of the potlatch passed by the Government of Canada, begun in 1885 and lasting until 1951.

Some First Nations saw the law as an instrument of intolerance and injustice, seeing it as an effort by the Canadian government to extinguish their indigenous traditions and enforce Euro-Canadian culture. Some First Nation groups however, supported the bans.

Though often ignored and circumvented, the ban remained in Canadian legal codes until 1951, when Section 149 was deleted from a revision of the Indian Act. Arrests for charges under the Act were few until 1921, when a raid on the village of Memkumlis held by Chief Dan Cranmer saw the arrest and charges laid against 45 people; of these 22 were given suspended sentences (three were remanded on appeal) and 20 men and women sent to Oakalla Prison in Burnaby. The sentences were two months for first offenders and three months for second offenders.

== History ==
Potlatch, which means "to give" or "a gift" in the Chinook Jargon, became adapted to refer to "the different ceremonies among [the] many nations of the Pacific Northwest that ... [include] feasting, dancing and giving gifts to all in attendance". It is also described somewhat more completely by The Story of the Masks website from the U'mista Cultural Centre in Alert Bay as "The potlatch refers to the ceremony where families gather and names are given, births are announced, marriages are conducted, and where families mourn the loss of a loved one. The potlatch is also the ceremony where a chief will pass on his rights and privileges to his eldest son."

The British Columbia Indian Office, specifically the Indian Commissioner, I. W. Powell, had found the native peoples to be rich and hardy, but also found they appeared as if they were poor. This finding led to further research on the subject of potlatches where it was found that to the Indigenous peoples of the region, the Potlatch was a great institution. It encouraged people to give away their earnings and possessions (including slaves). In exchange, the giver would receive a great deal of respect and be seen as honourable to his tribe and others.

However, Canadian Prime Minister John A. Macdonald did not see this tradition as valuable or appropriate and, under the guise of unifying the Dominion of Canada, encouraged the government to lay "an iron hand on the shoulders of the [native] people" by restricting some of their non-essential, inappropriate rituals and leading them towards what he perceived as a "healthier" European mindset. Work thus began on an amendment to the Indian Act of 1880. Some criticized the idea, such as James Benjamin McCullagh in his essay on the tribal lifestyle of the indigenous peoples of Canada, "The Indian Potlatch".

In the third section of the Indian Act, signed on April 19, 1884, it was declared that:

Every Indian or other person who engages in or assists in celebrating the Indian festival known as the "Potlatch" or in the Indian dance known as the "Tamanawas" is guilty of a misdemeanor, and liable to imprisonment for a term of not more than six nor less than two months in any gaol or other place of confinement; and every Indian or persons who encourages ... an Indian to get up such a festival ... shall be liable to the same punishment.

Sectors of native communities themselves also wanted to ban the Potlach. In 1883 the department of Indian affairs received a petition from the Coast Tsimshian and Nisga’a Chiefs at Port Simpson, Kincolith, Green Ville "praying that the system of Potlatching as practiced by many Indian Tribes on the Coast of British Columbia may be put down”

There were others who wanted to keep the practice of Potlach alive. German-born anthropologist Franz Boas not only opposed the ban; with the help of his First Nations assistant, he actually hosted one. Despite various opinions on the matter, the ban was eventually enacted, lasting until repealed in 1951. Some First Nations opponents of the ban saw the law as an instrument of injustice and intolerance.

== Reasons for the ban ==
As Canada expanded, they adhered to a number of ideologies at the time, including converting their colonial subjects to Christianity. Seeing that the potlatch was at the heart of a non-Christian cultural system that opposed colonization, the potlatch was targeted by missionaries and colonial officials.

Though there was an obvious political motivation for suppressing the potlatch, it was also very foreign to the norms of Protestant and mercantile Euro-Canadians who found it hard to comprehend. They saw the ritualistic act of giving away nearly all of one's hard-earned possessions as a sign that the indigenous people were "unstable". Under the encouragement of the Indian Reserve Allotment Commission, the Indian Reserve Commission, and the Anglican Church, this behaviour was deemed as a possible destabilizing force in the nation because it was so dramatically opposed to the values of the ideal "Christian capitalist society".

Two major players in the Canadian potlatch ban were George Blenkinsop and Gilbert M. Sproat. Blenkinsop was a government agent commissioned to survey the lifestyle of the indigenous peoples residing in Barkley Sound. His findings on native culture were not encouraging to the Government, as he reported that there was "little hope of elevating ... [the natives] from their present state of degradation" without eliminating ceremonies such as the potlatch. Gilbert M. Sproat, on the other hand, was a "joint Federal-Provincial appointee to the Indian Reserve Commission". In this regard, he had worked closely with different native groups and tribes throughout British Columbia. In 1879, Sproat sent a strongly worded letter to Prime Minister John A. Macdonald. In the letter, Sproat declared that the potlatch ceremony was "the parent of numerous vices which eat out the heart of the [native] people", and reaffirmed the words of Blenkinsop by assuring the Prime Minister that "It is not possible that the Indians can acquire property, or can become industrious with any good result, while under the influence of ... [the potlatch]".

Sproat's opinion was a commonly held one for white employers in British Columbia. Euro-Canadians saw the potlatch as a pointless ceremony that did little but advance barbarity and retract the ability of the native peoples to fully assimilate themselves in mainstream society. Essentially, the potlatch was an important ritual to the natives that prevented assimilation into the melting pot the Euro-Canadian government sought to enforce.

Employers found similar problems. Many of the aboriginal peoples of 1800s British Columbia were often motivated to work in order to gain wealth which would permit them to buy more items for potlatches, which would result in greater honour. This work was often seasonal in nature. This was in direct contrast to the agendas of many of the "white" employers who ultimately were frustrated by what they perceived to be the native "work ethic". According to John Lutz, written accounts of white employers were almost bipolar because of the indigenous peoples' seasonal working habits. This seasonal work permitted them to choose when they would work or when they would stay in their villages. Some employers deemed them "as 'indispensable' while [others] condemned their "unreliability" and "laziness".

Missionaries of the northwestern regions of Canada also sent their opinions to the government. Most commonly they stated their arguments based on three fields: health, morality and economics. On the issue of health, the missionaries worried about the spread of disease amongst the large groups that gathered for potlatches, and critiqued the native peoples' recklessness. Specifically, they called out against the treatment of children, accusing those who attend potlatches of being responsible for the statistic claiming that "Six out of every ten [native] infants die" and that losing all of a family's possessions led to greater health risks to the family who hosted the potlatch. On the issue of morality, missionaries claimed that potlatches and financial requirements led wives and "maiden daughters" of those hosting to turn to prostitution to help their fathers gather wealth, as well as the consumption of alcohol. The issue of economics was simple in the notion that the native desire to give away all their goods was the opposite of the "Christian capitalist" values held in high esteem by Euro-Canadians.

== Opponents ==
Aside from the Chiefs who were potlatching, there were other voices lent to oppose the imposition of a potlatch ban. The German-born anthropologist Franz Boas was familiar with the institution through his work on Vancouver Island. He opposed the potlatch ban and spoke out against repression of traditional religion.

== Results and legacy ==
The first person to be charged under the law was a Sto:lo man from Chilliwack, Bill Uslick, who horrified Indian agent Frank Delvin by giving away all his goods, "practically left himself destitute." He was arrested February 1, 1896, and sentenced to two months prison. Upon its release, the amendment to the Indian Act was found to be ineffectual due to a lack of enforcement. There are several recorded arrests in which the native peoples found loopholes in the edict and held potlatches in celebratory seasons, claiming to be doing what was "customary with white people during this season", and celebrating potlatches around holidays such as Christmas. Other groups made formal requests that they be able to host potlatches, but were refused.

"The legal suppression of the potlatch became a symbol, in both native and white communities, of the Canadian treatment of British Columbia Indians."

The potlatch ban was never entirely effective, though it did significant cultural damage, and continued underground through the period of the ban in a number of places and ways. The potlatch ban and related banning of the sun dance and Coast Salish dancing occurred during the height of repressive colonial laws in Canada, lasting until 1951. After 1951, the Indian Act was amended, removing some of the more repressive measures, including the ban on the potlatch.

After the ban was lifted, Nations on the coast began to openly potlatch again. The revival of open ceremony gained strength during the 1970s and 1980s, and it is once again widespread among many of the Nations that previously potlatched prior to the ban.

== See also ==
- Athabaskan potlatch
- Heiltsuk
- Indian Act
- Potlatch

== Bibliography ==
Notes

References

- Bracken, Christopher (1997). The Potlatch Papers: A Colonial Case History. University of Chicago Press. ISBN 9780226069876.
- Carlson, Keith Thor (1997). You are Asked to Witness : the Stó:l̄o in Canada's Pacific Coast History. Teacher's Guide. Sto:lo Heritage Trust. ISBN 9780968157732.
- Cole, Douglas; Chaikin, Ira (1990). An Iron Hand Upon the People: The Law Against the Potlatch on the Northwest Coast. Vancouver/Toronto: Douglas & McIntyre. p. 1. ISBN 0888946953.
- Griffin, Kevin (December 23, 2016). "This Week in History, 1921: Mass arrests at Kwakwaka'wakw potlatch took place Christmas Day". Vancouver Sun.
- Hou, Charles (1983). To Potlatch Or Not to Potlatch: An In-depth Study of Culture-conflict Between the B.C. Coastal Indian and the White Man. British Columbia Teachers' Federation. - Total pages: 82
- Lutz, John (1992). "After the Fur Trade: The Aboriginal Labouring Class of British Columbia, 1849-1890". Journal of the Canadian Historical Association. 3 (1): 69–93. doi:10.7202/031045ar. ISSN 0847-4478.
