= Fort Rupert =

Fort Rupert Tsax̱is
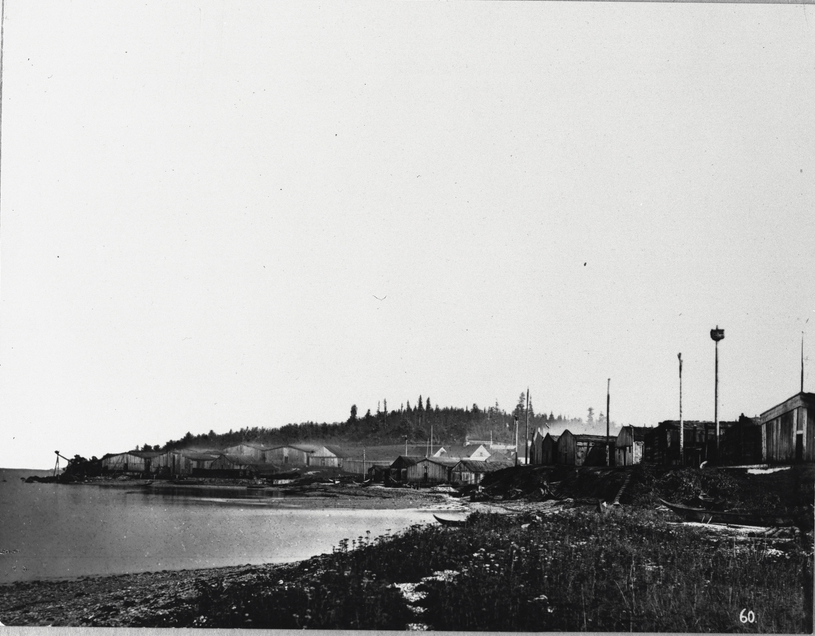
- Fort Rupert in 1878

- Location of Fort Rupert in British Columbia
- Coordinates: 50°41′40″N 127°24′43″W
- Country: Canada
- Province: British Columbia
- Region: Vancouver Island
- Regional District: Mount Waddington
- Area codes: 250, 778, 236, & 672

Fort Rupert (Kwak'wala: Tsax̱is) is the site of a former Hudson's Bay Company (HBC) fort on the east coast near the northern tip of Vancouver Island, British Columbia. The unincorporated community on Beaver Harbour is about 11 kilometres (7 mi) by road southeast of Port Hardy.

== Coal & fortifications ==
In 1835, the HBC became aware of coal deposits in the area, but no market existed until a steamboat presence emerged a decade later.

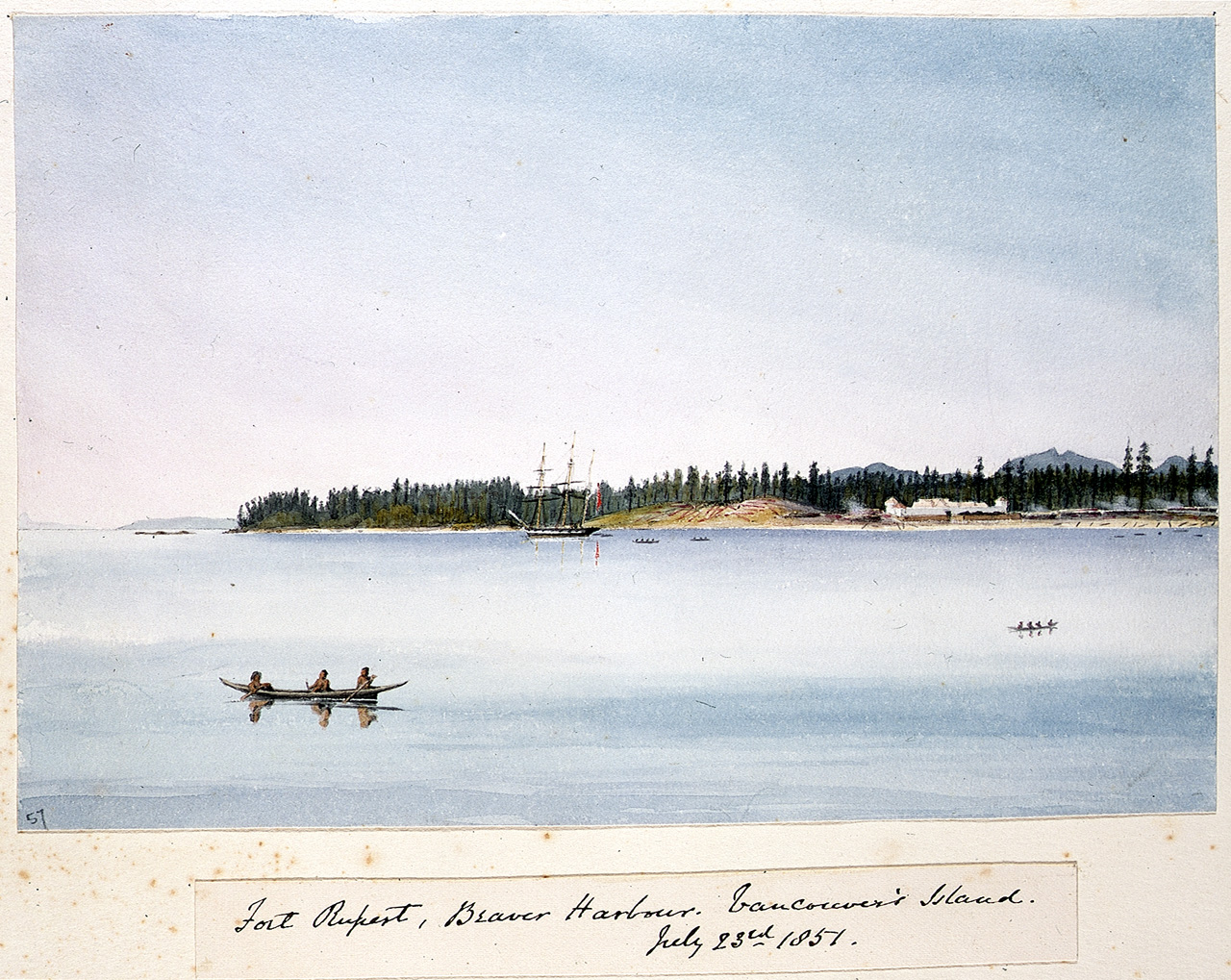
Fort Rupert, 1851.

Realizing the closing of Fort McLoughlin in the early 1840s had been a mistake, the HBC sought a new location partly motivated by Admiralty interest in coal. In 1849, men under the charge of Captain William Henry McNeill, assisted by John Work, erected Fort Rupert. Named after Prince Rupert of the Rhine, the first HBC governor, the strong fortifications were to provide protection from the fierce Nahwitti warriors in the vicinity. The 5-metre (18 ft) high stockade held a cannon in the two bastions. The dimensions were 62 metres (202 ft) on the northwest side, 63 metres (207 ft) on the northeast side, 62 metres (202 ft) on the southeast side, and 61 metres (200 ft) on the southwest side paralleling Wah-wese Creek. About a dozen Europeans manned the fort. The only contact with the outside world was the twice yearly HBC steamboat.

In 1851, final construction was complete. That year, Robert Dunsmuir was appointed foreman over a crew of immigrant coalminers. Many of the Scottish miners refused to undertake non-mining work, and also were unhappy that the company provided limited protection against armed attacks outside the fort. Workers who refused to perform their duties were put in irons and placed on rations. Deserters risked death at the hands of the Nahwitti. Mining ceased in 1852. Dunsmuir was reassigned to the HBC coal operations at Nanaimo.

There were only two small rusted cannons in the fort, since any attempt to defend it against an attack by overwhelming numbers would be pointless. Individual Nahwitti would climb the outside walls and leer down at the occupants.

== Early First Nations presence ==
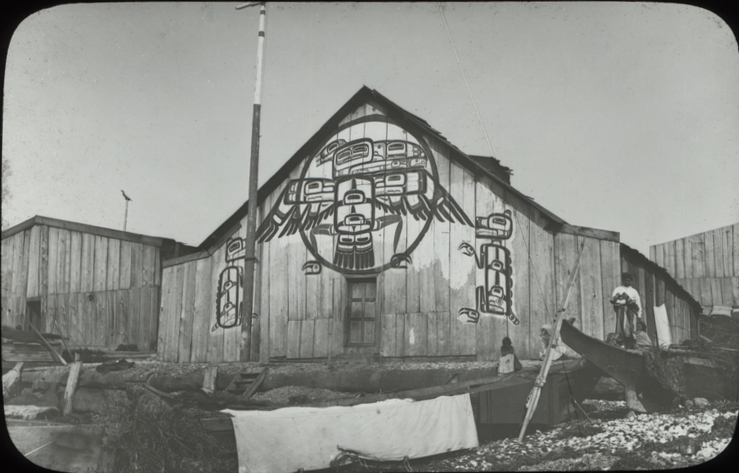
Kwakwaka'wakw house, Fort Rupert, 1885

No First Nations settlements existed in the immediate area. To take advantage of the new trading post, a Kwakwaka'wakw settlement quickly sprang up, housing about 600–700 people. Visits by royal naval officers sought to diffuse inter-tribal warfare, but also burned down houses for refusal to hand over tribesmen wanted for murder.

During the 1862 Pacific Northwest smallpox epidemic thousands of indigenous people were evicted from large semi-permanent camps near Victoria and forced to return to their homelands, spreading smallpox throughout the Pacific Northwest coast. Groups of Kwakwakaʼwakw thus brought smallpox from Victoria to the Fort Rupert area. HBC employee Hamilton Moffat inoculated over 100 tribal members near Fort Rupert with smallpox vaccine. Nonetheless, smallpox spread throughout northern Vancouver Island. Over the summer of 1862, smallpox reduced the Kwakwakaʼwakw population by over 50%.

Cannibalism, as part of slave or child sacrifices, was practised among the tribes into the 1870s. Two decades later, corpses had been substituted in the ritual.

== Hunt general store replaced the fort ==
The fort continued as a trading post, but business declined in the 1860s. An 1863 fire destroyed four houses and took one life. In 1868, factor Robert Hunt was transferred to Fort Simpson, but returned in 1872. By 1882, the HBC had abandoned the fort. In 1885, Hunt purchased the entire site for $1,500. In 1889, a fire consumed the former officers' quarters.

Following further deterioration, the nearby Nahwitti salvaged items from the ruins, including metal objects such as knives, nails, and hammers. Allegedly, they also took iron and brass eight-pounder cannons and kept them in their village, Ku-Kultz.

The Hunt family ran a general store, which passed to descendants, the Cadwallader family. An 1890 ledger entry mentions a $96.50 theft, Cadwallader tracking down the two suspects, and the restitution extracted.

== Present-day First Nations ==
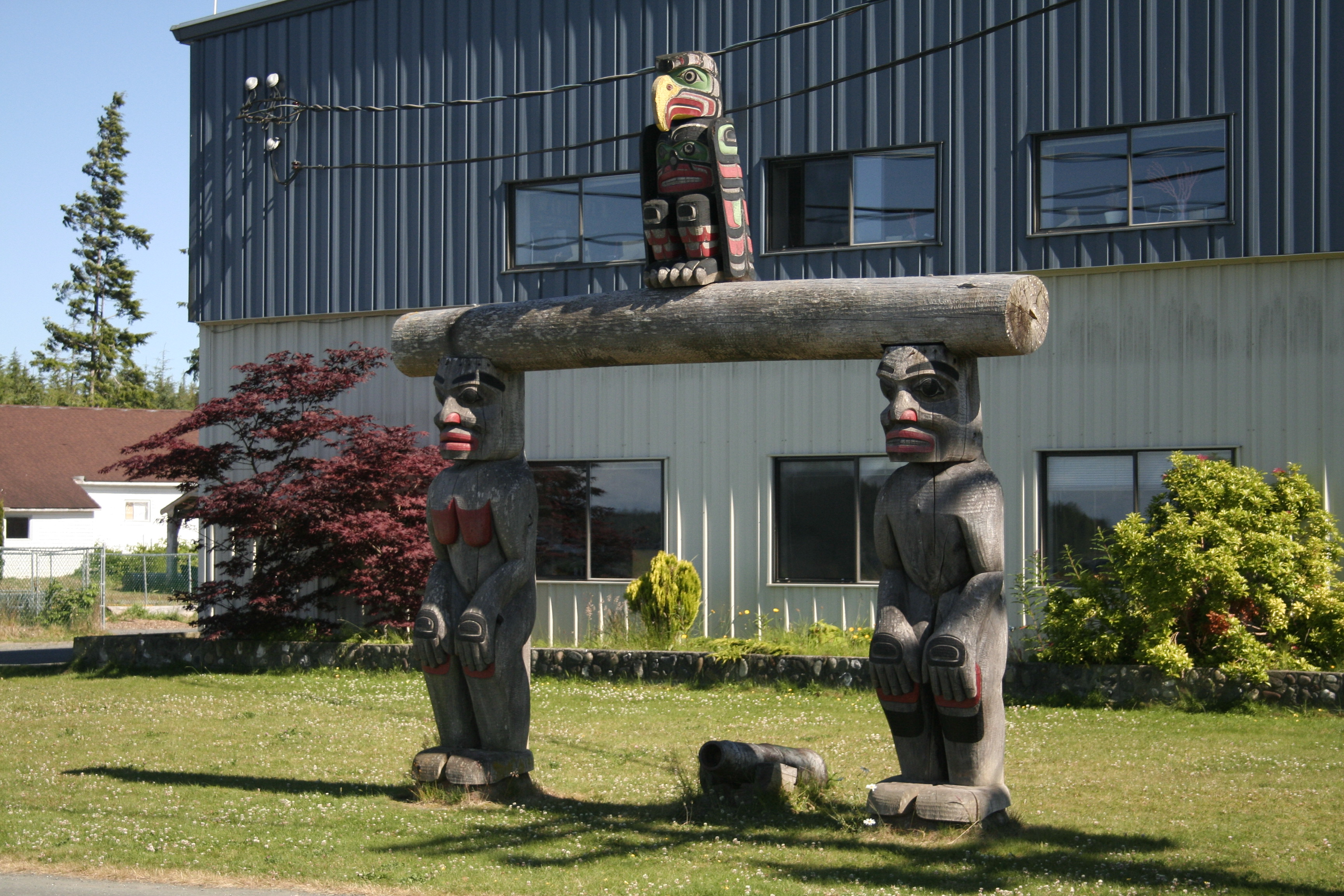
A welcome pole in front of U'gwamalis Hall, the Band Office for the Kwakiutl First Nation.

The present-day village of Fort Rupert is a historic Kwakwaka'wakw village of the Kwagu'ł (Kwagyewlth or Kwakiutl) and the Komoyue subgroup, where totem pole carving, and completion of artwork and traditional crafts can be observed. The band government of the Kwagu'ł is the Kwakiutl First Nation.

Petroglyphs, though difficult to find, exist on the sandstone formations in the higher tidal zones below the former fort site.

== Archaeological site ==
Apparently, a cannon from Ku-Kultz was taken to Vancouver in 1976. The Maritime Museum of British Columbia has a cast iron 9-pounder carronade believed to be from the fort. Subsequently, scuba divers stumbled across six cannons on a sandy beach of an isolated bay in the region.

At the Fort Rupert site, all that remains are various footings, drains, the huge stone chimney of the factor's residence, the Hunt family cemetery, and the collapsed Cadwallader store.

== See also ==
- Royal eponyms in Canada
- List of Kwakwaka'wakw villages
