= Tommy Blenkinsopp =

English footballer

Personal information
- Full name: Thomas William Blenkinsopp
- Date of birth: 13 May 1920
- Place of birth: Witton Park, England
- Date of death: 29 January 2004 (aged 83)
- Place of death: Witton Park, England
- Position: Defender

Youth career
- West Auckland

Senior career*
Years	Team	Apps	(Gls)
1939–1948	Grimsby Town	74	(10)
1939–1940	→ Hartlepool United (wartime)		
1948–1952	Middlesbrough	98	(0)
1952–1953	Barnsley	8	(0)
- Blyth Spartans
- * Club domestic league appearances and goals

Thomas William Blenkinsopp (13 May 1920 – 29 January 2004) was an English footballer, who played for Grimsby Town, Middlesbrough and Barnsley.

Blenkinsopp signed professional forms with Grimsby Town just before the outbreak of World War II.

He made eight appearances in the wartime North-East League for Hartlepool United during the 1939–40 season. He also represented the Football League.

He signed for Middlesbrough in 1948 for transfer fee of £12,000.

After his professional career ended with Barnsley, he went on to play for Blyth Spartans.
