= George Blenkinsop =

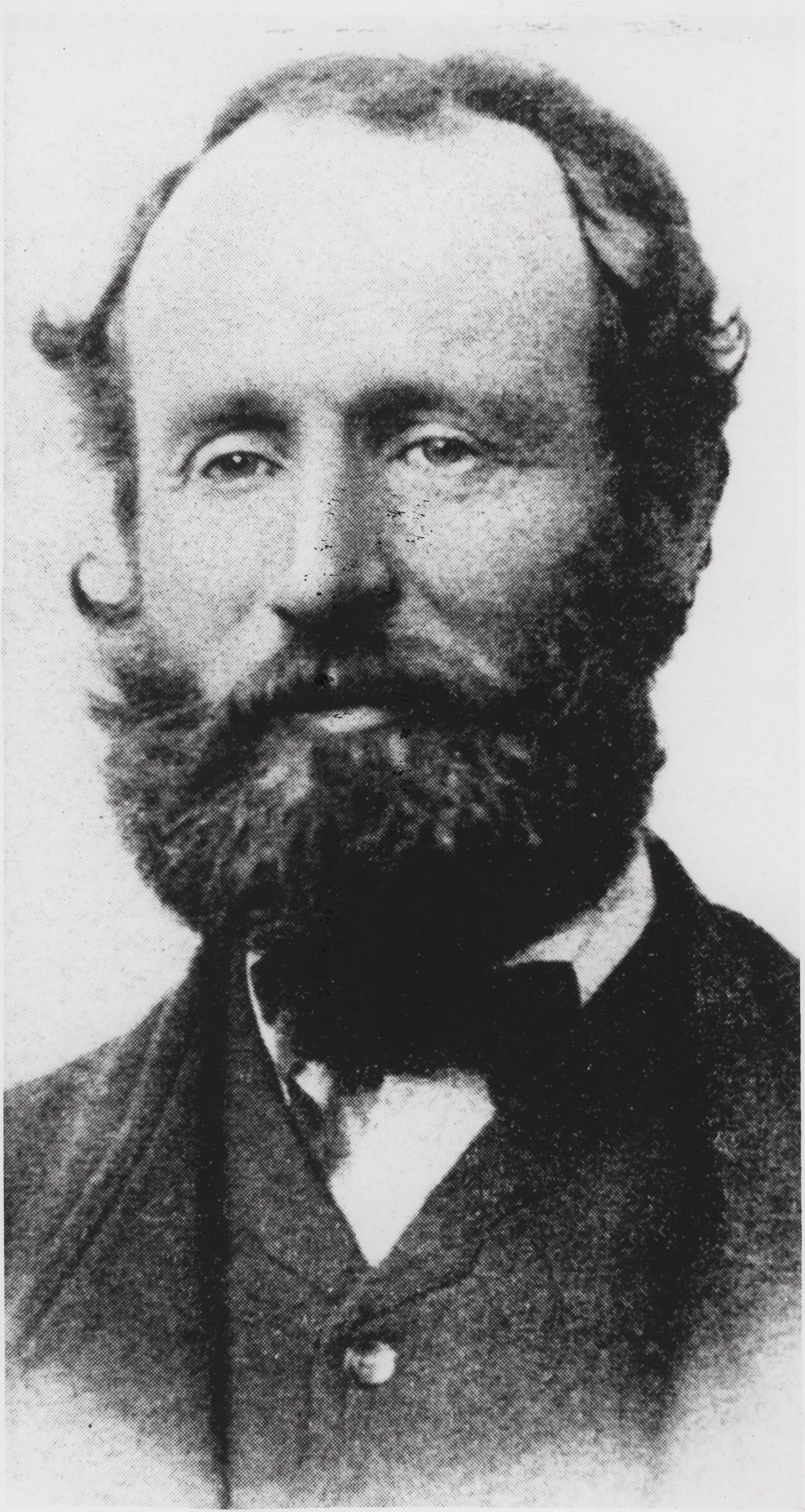
- Born: 1822

George Blenkinsop (1822 – 2 June 1904) was a Hudson's Bay Company employee who made important contributions to Canadian history as a pioneer in the British Columbia area of the country.
