= Bakwas =

Supernatural being from Kwakwakaʼwakw religion

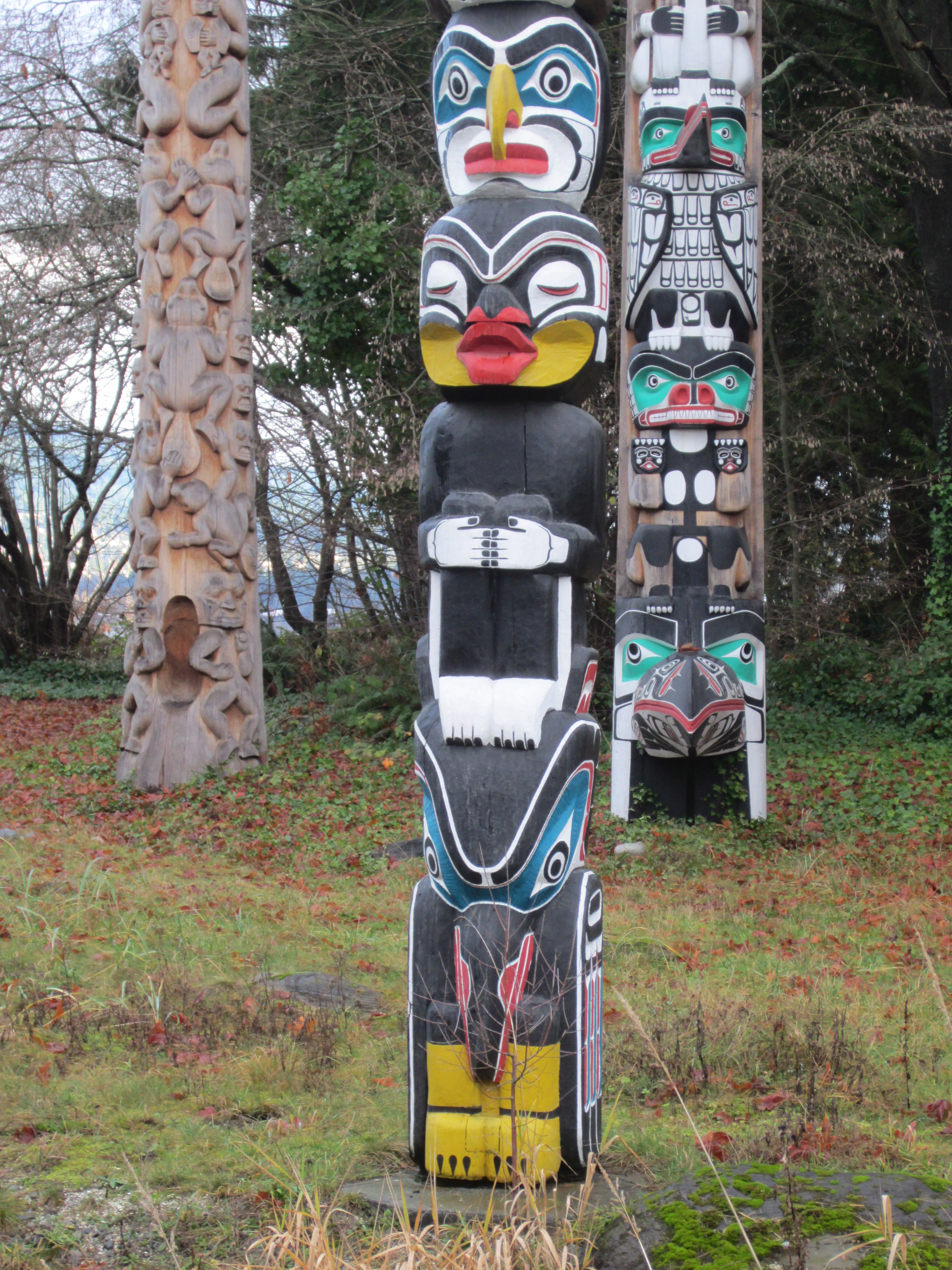
Kakasoʼlas pole by Ellen Neel depicting (from top to bottom) Bakwa, Dzunukwa, and Raven

Bakwas (sometimes "bokwus", "bookwus "or "bukwis") is one of the supernatural spirits of the Kwakwaka'wakw people of coastal British Columbia. He is often called "wild man of the woods." He eats ghost food out of cockle shells and tries to offer this to living humans who are stranded in the woods, in order to bring them over to the ghost world. If the human were to eat this food, it would turn them into a being like the bakwas. He lives in an invisible house in the forest and the spirits of the drowned congregate there. In some myths he is described as the consort of dzunukwa, and the father of her children.

He is similar to ghost beings belonging to the cultures of other Northwest Coast tribes. The Tlingit have kushtaka, or land-otter people; the Haida have gagit, drowned spirit ghosts; the Nuu-chah-nulth have pukubts, a name which seems etymologically related to the Kwakiutl bakwas, as is the Tsimshian ba'wis.

== See also ==
- Himwitsa
