= Kakasoʼlas pole =

Totem pole by Ellen Neel

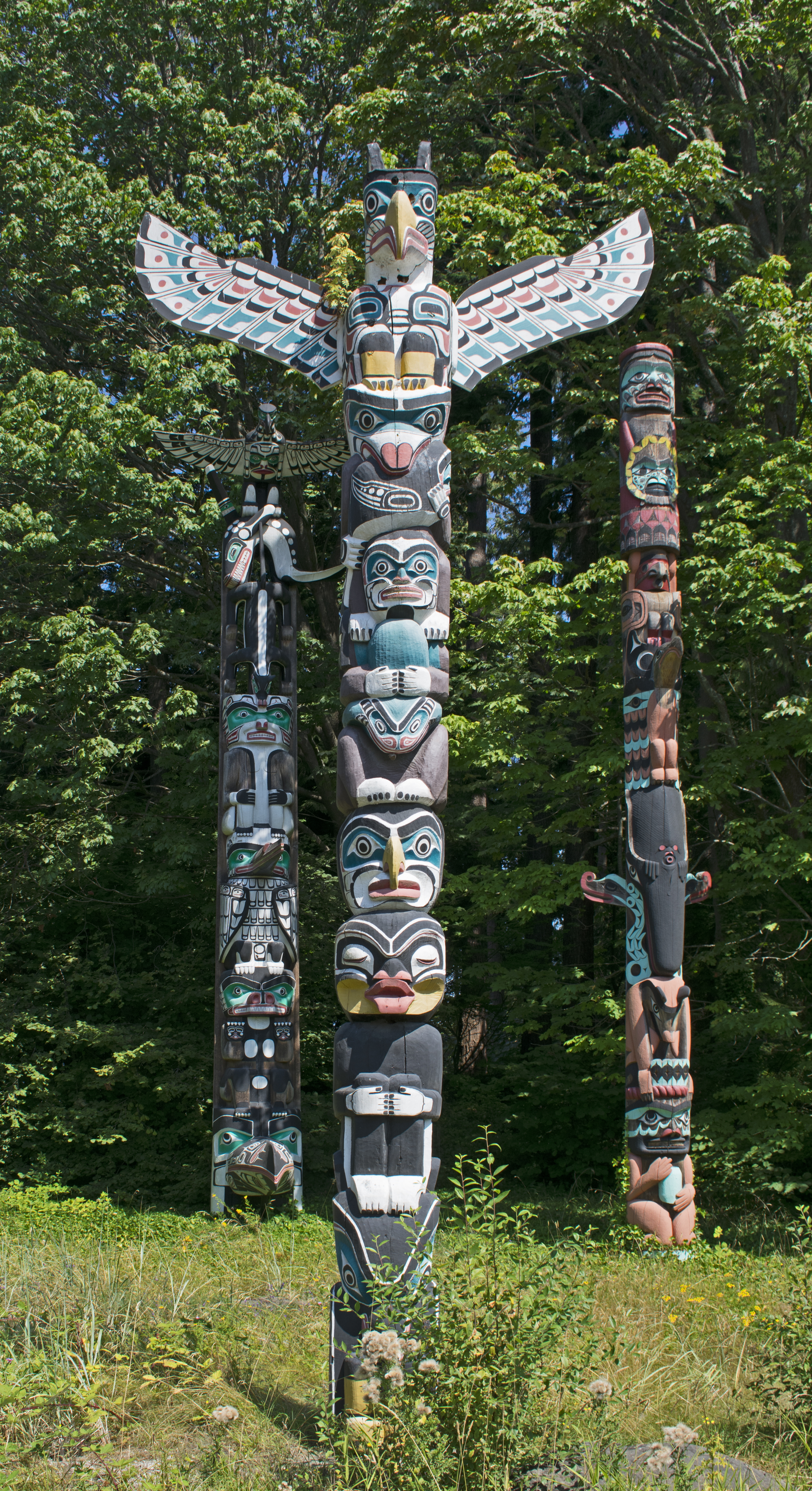
- Kakaso’las totem pole in Stanley Park, centre foreground
- Artist: Ellen Neel
- Year: 1955
- Location: Museum of Anthropology at UBC, Vancouver, British Columbia, Canada

The Kakasoʼlas pole, also known as the Eagle Pole, is a totem pole created by Canadian and Kwakwakaʼwakw carver Ellen Neel. Carved in 1955 as part of a five-pole commission for a Woodward's store in Edmonton, Alberta, the pole was donated in 1984 to the Museum of Anthropology at UBC. The museum loaned the totem pole to the local park board, and it was installed at Brockton Point in Stanley Park in Vancouver in 1985. It remained in the parks for the next several decades before being removed in 2024 and returned to the museum's collection.

== History ==
Ellen Neel, a Canadian and Kwakwakaʼwakw carver and one of the few successful female totem pole carvers of her time, received permission in the 1940s to carve and sell her art in Vancouver's Stanley Park. She worked from a studio in Ferguson point; the studio had previously been a WW2 bunker. In 1955, she was commissioned by the department store Woodward's to carve five totem poles for their Westmount Shopping Centre in Edmonton, Alberta. The poles were carved by her and her family that year near Neel's Totem Art Studio, in Stanley Park, and installed at the shopping centre.

In 1984, several years after Neel's death, Woodward's donated the Kakasoʼlas totem pole to the Museum of Anthropology at UBC in Vancouver. Two of the other poles Neel had carved for Woodward were also acquired by the museum. The museum, "in memory of Neel's pioneering role in reaching an international audience through her art", loaned the Kakasoʼlas pole to the park board; after undergoing restorations by Neel's son, Robert, the totem pole was installed at Brockton Point in Stanley Park in September 1985. It replaced an older totem pole. In 2012, it was the oldest totem pole in the park.

Citing the pole's deteriorating condition, the Museum of Anthropology and Neel's family decided to remove the totem pole from the park in 2024 and take it to an indoor location at the museum. The totem pole was removed in September of that year; Neel's granddaughter, Lou-ann Neel, sang and performed a ceremony as it was taken down. According to Lou-ann Neel, even though the Museum of Anthropology was in Vancouver, not Ellen Neel's ancestral home, she wanted to respect the commercial nature of the Kakasoʼlas pole. Additionally, Neel's home community did not have the resources to maintain and extensive totem pole collection.

== Description ==
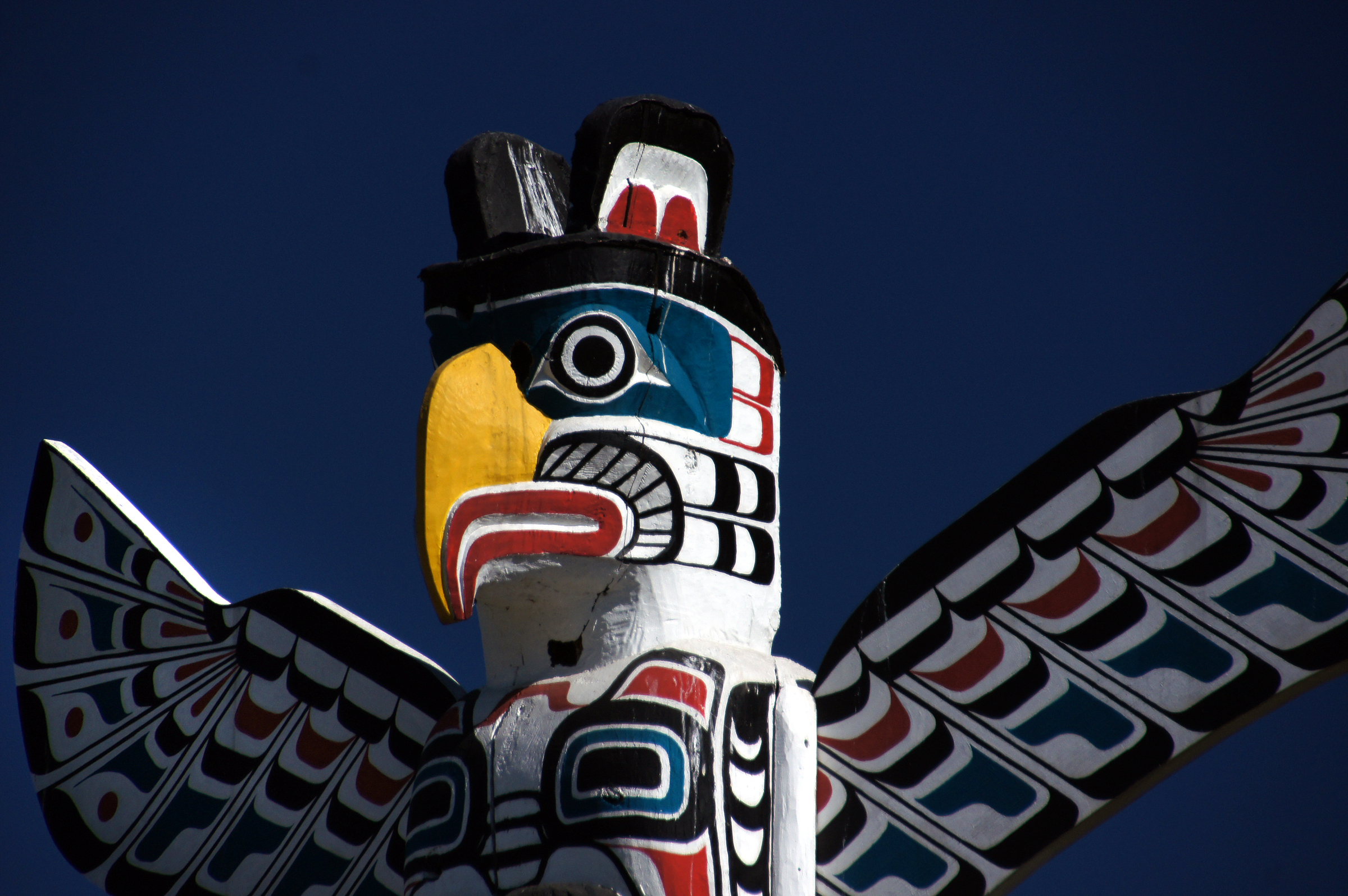

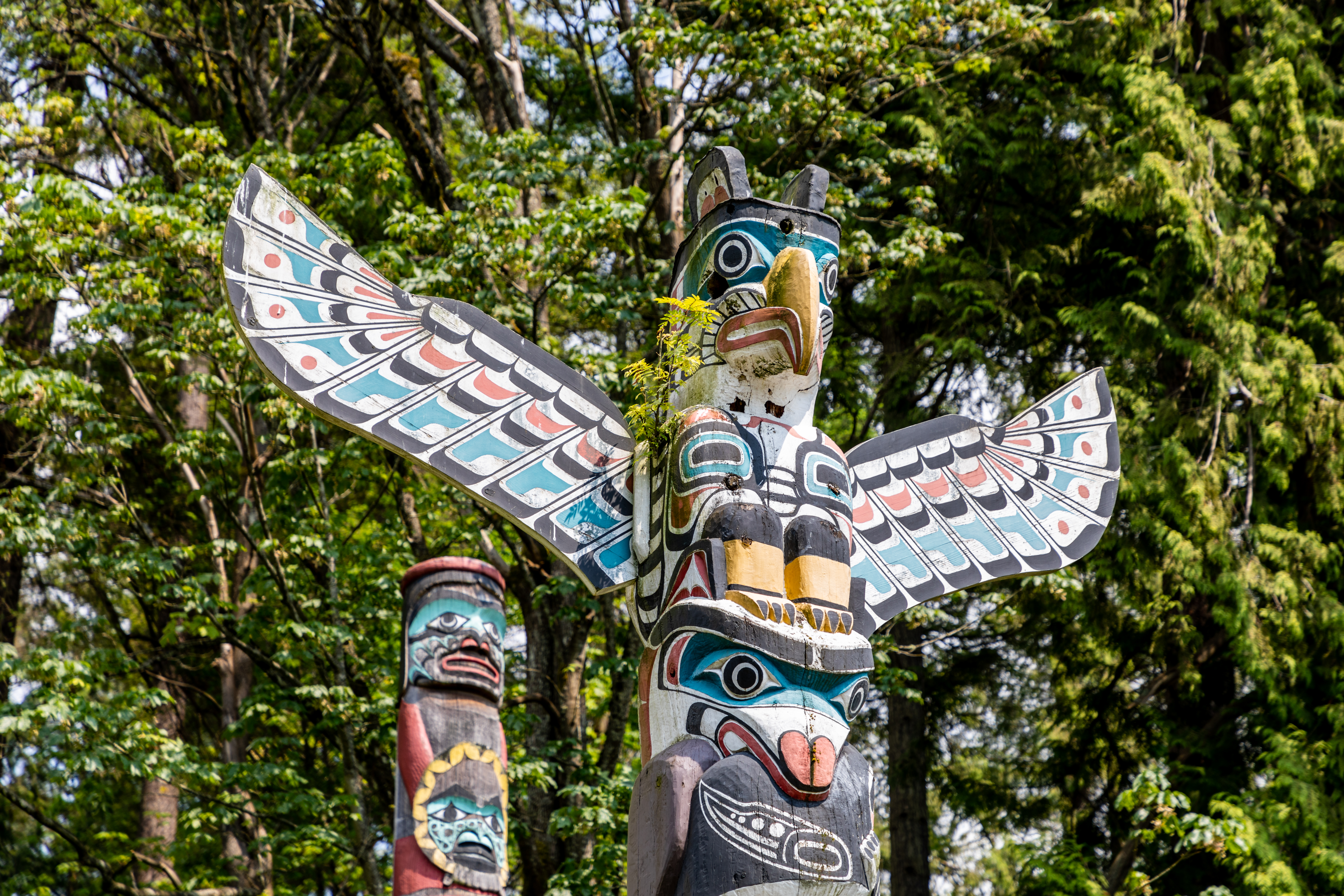
Closeups of the thunderbird at the top of the pole

The Kakasoʼlas totem pole is 6 metres (20 ft) tall and depicts several Kwakwakaʼwakw figures. At the top of the pole is a thunderbird. Below it is a sea bear with an orca in its arms; the sea bear itself stands on a human figure holding a frog. Beneath those are Bakwas, then the giantess Dzunukwa. At the base of the pole is Raven.

The totem pole's name comes from Ellen Neel's own Kwak'wala language name: Kakasoʼlas. According to Neel's granddaughter, Lou-ann Neel, "There may have been an assumption that that was what the pole was named, and it just came to be called that after a while. [The family] didn't have a problem with it because it still associated the pole with my grandmother".

== Gallery ==
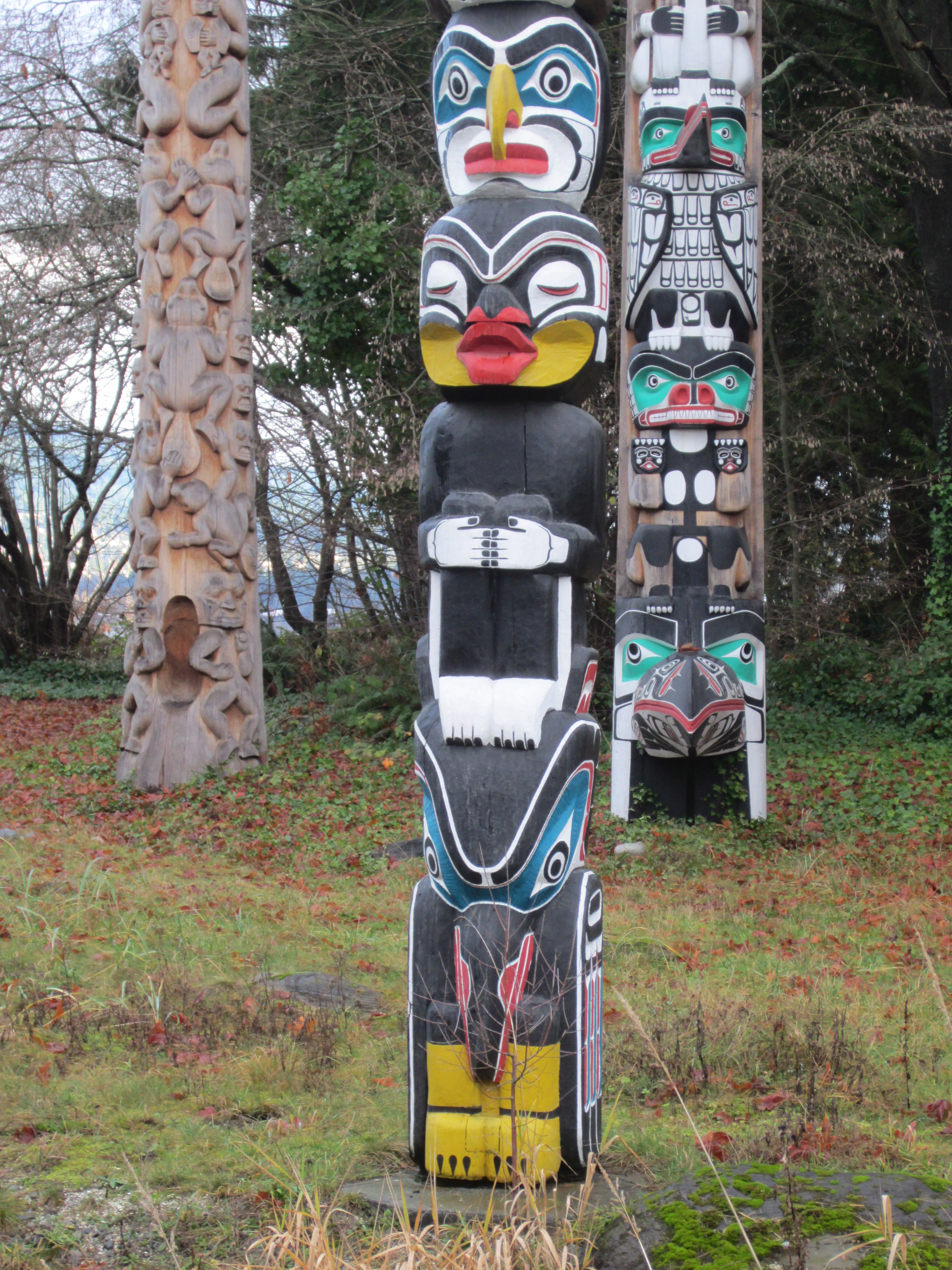
Bakwas, Dzunukwa, and Raven

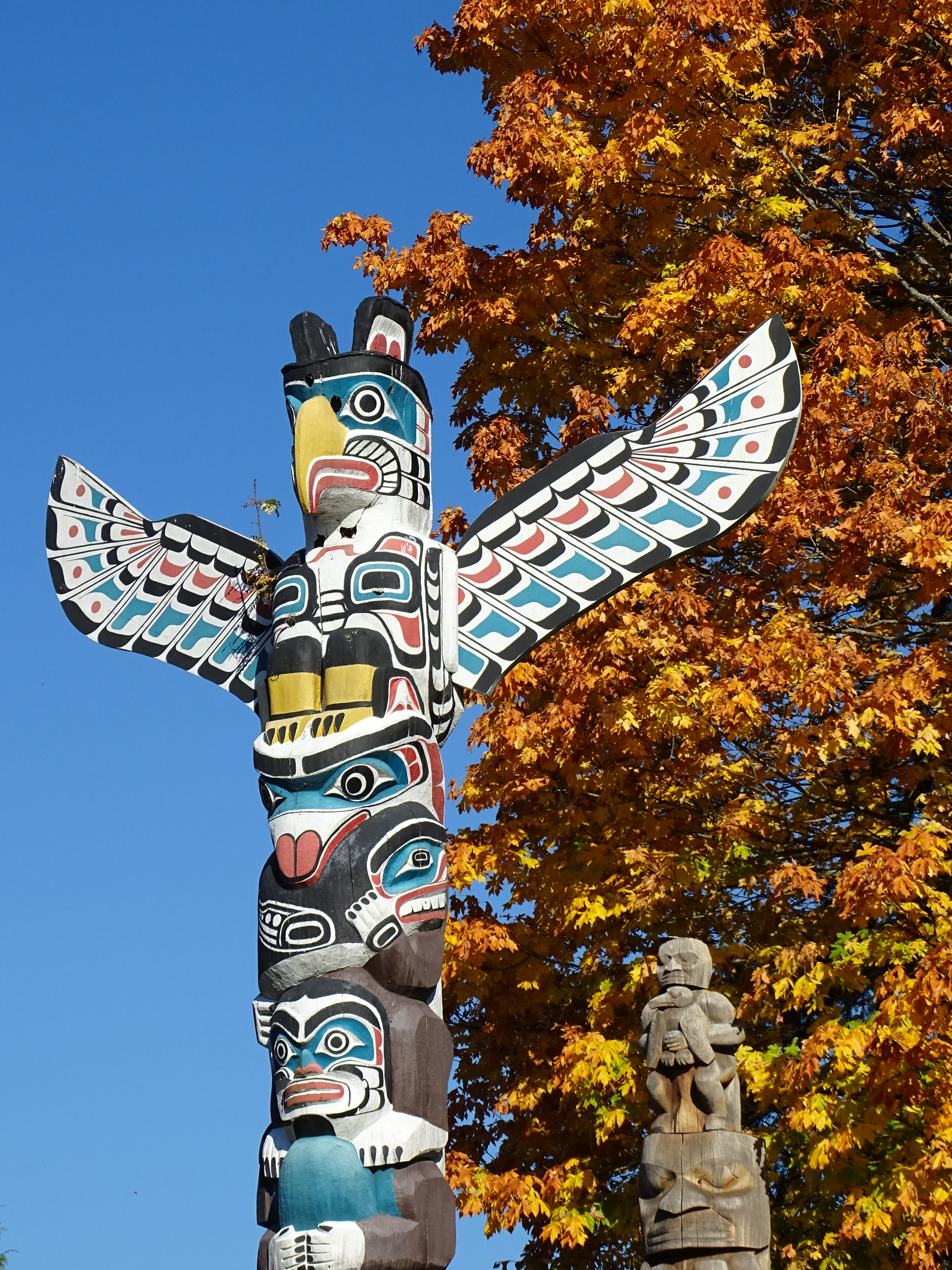
Thunderbird, Sea Bear holding orca, and human holding frog

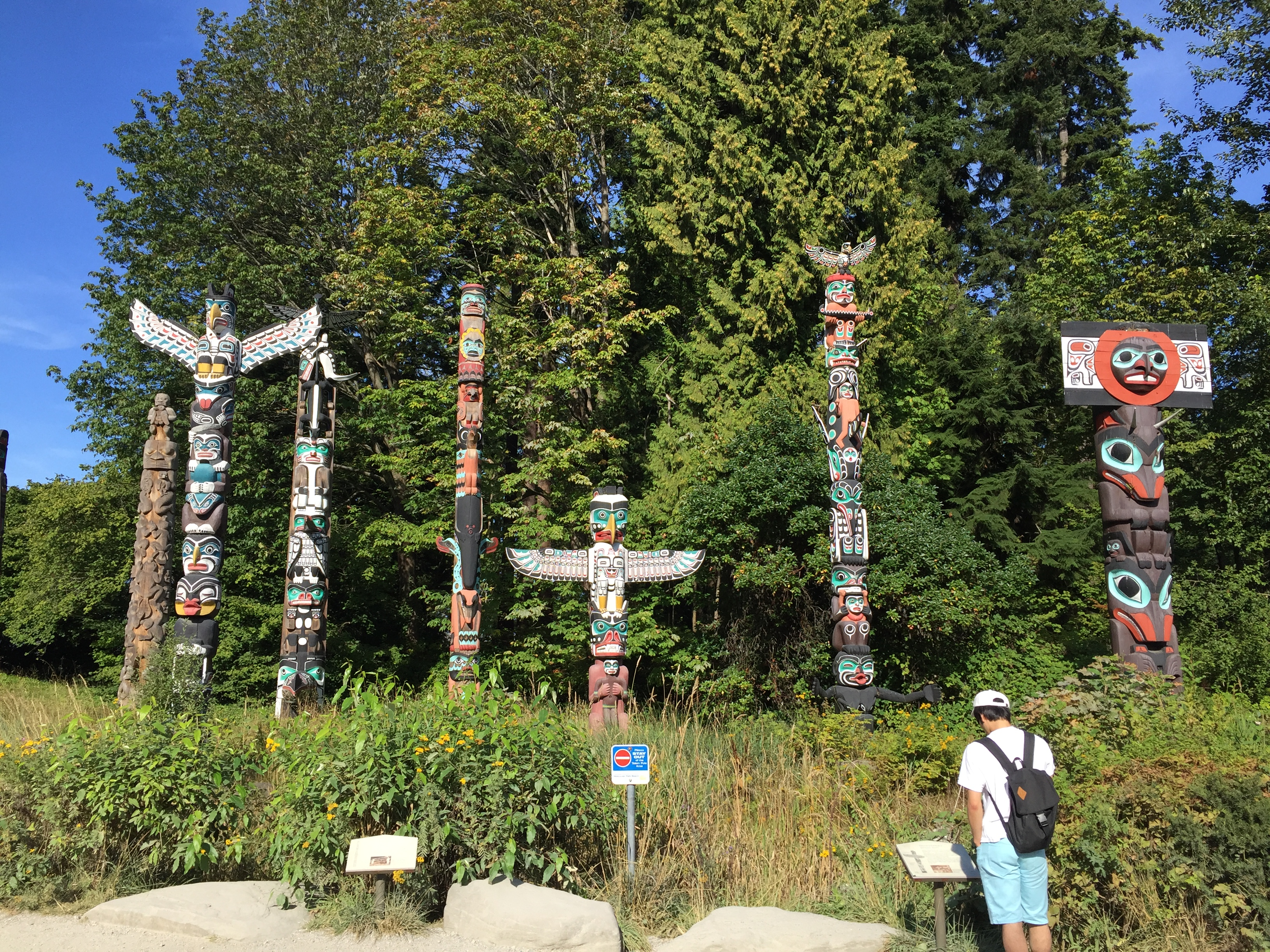
Kakasoʼlas pole (second from left) at Stanley Park

== See also ==
- List of totem poles
