= Willie Seaweed =

Kwakwaka'wakw chief and wood carver from Canada

Willie Seaweed (c. 1873–1967) was a Kwakwaka'wakw chief and wood carver from Canada. He was considered a master Northwest Coast Indian artist who is remembered for his technical artistic style and protection of traditional native ceremonies during the Canadian potlatch ceremony ban. Today, Seaweed's work can be found in cultural centers and corporations, art museums, natural history museums, and private collections. Some pieces are still in use by the Nak'waxda'xw tribe.

== Early life and education ==
Willie Seaweed was born around 1873 in the village of Tigwaxsti. He grew up in Blunden Harbour, British Columbia, known natively as Ba'a's, where he lived until his death in 1967. Both Seaweed's parents came from chiefly lines, and his father was head chief of the Gixsam sect of the Nak'waxda'xw tribe in the Kwakwaka'wakw region. Seaweed's father died before he was born, leading Seaweed to inherit the title of Hilamas, head chief, at a young age. This ensured leadership was safeguarded within the family.

Seaweed was born into a native reservation at a time of significant exposure to white settlers following the fur trade, gold rush, and colonization along the Canadian coast. Because of this, contact between white settlers and Canadian tribes was common. Seaweed's village Blunden Harbour, however, was located in the mountainous terrain of British Columbia's Northwest Coast, isolating it from direct European interaction and allowing indigenous cultural practices to continue undisturbed.

Although contemporary practice was for First Nations youth to attend a residential school, Seaweed was not sent to boarding school. Instead he was raised to speak the traditional Kwak'wala language, which he maintained during his lifetime. Part of Kwakwaka'wakw education included an apprenticeship to learn traditional carving practices. Under the guidance of elders, usually a father or uncle, the Kwakwaka'wakw student would learn traditional Northwest Coast artistic methods through observation and practice. Due to the death of Seaweed's father prior to the artist's birth, little is known about his individual training as a carver. Scholars agree Seaweed likely apprenticed with his older half-brother and fellow artist, Johnny Davis.

== Kwakwaka'wakw life ==
=== Nak'waxda'xw Tribe ===
As chief of the Nak'waxda'xw nation, Seaweed was called Hilamas, meaning "Right Maker". Willie Seaweed was his official Canadian name, as First Nations peoples were required to have a legal name recognized by the government. He was known informally as Kwaghitola or Smoky Top.

Due to his chiefly ancestry, Seaweed was considered one of the highest-ranking leaders in the Nak'waxda'xw tribe. The position of chief rendered Seaweed a source of historical knowledge, a ceremonial leader, and a distributor of wealth. As was tradition, Seaweed married multiple times to the daughters of past chiefs. These marriages allowed Seaweed to inherit privileged information restricted to kin groups, including legends, dances, songs, and ancestral information. Seaweed had one surviving child, son Joe Seaweed, whom he also awarded the Hilamas title at a young age.

In addition to his role as chief, Seaweed was a fisherman and a master artist. Artists were commonly high-rank members of a tribe, like Seaweed, due to their possession of cultural knowledge. Artists were central figures in the tribal community because they translated important narratives and mythologies it into visual artwork. Seaweed's artwork was made primarily for use during Native potlatch ceremonies, which he also participated in as a singer, composer, dancer, and comedic performer.

=== Potlatch ban ===
Seaweed's professional artistic career coincided with the 1876 Canadian ban on the potlatch ceremony, which was later repealed in 1951. These tribal ceremonies involve feasts, traditional performances, wealth distribution, initiations, and gift giving. Christian missionaries and the Canadian government believed potlatch ceremonies to be immoral and dangerous to Western assimilation efforts. Punishment for engaging in potlatch practice could entail two to six months in prison.

The Nak'waxda'xw openly resisted the ban and continued to practice the potlatch ceremony. The mountainous region allowed the tribe to protect their traditions, leading to them being considered masters of the potlatch ceremonies. Art played a key role in these performances as a method to pass down knowledge to younger generations.

Seaweed's art was considered illegal because of its ceremonial nature to coincide with potlatch ceremonies. Seaweed's masks acted as visual aids to tell a narrative, some containing moveable jaws or hidden wooden hair tendrils that allowed the masks to transform throughout the performance. The Kwakwaka'wakw's winter Hamatsa ceremony was especially elaborate, and the majority of native artwork, including Seaweed's, was meant to be displayed as an active part of the particular ceremony. Seaweed's personal effort to continue making artwork during the potlatch ban was a major factor in preserving traditional Kwakwaka'wakw culture.

== Artistic style ==
Seaweed's art is of the most recognizable from the Northwest Coast. He followed in the tradition of Charles James, Mungo Martin, and Charles Edenshaw. He created traditional objects in the Kwakwaka'wakw style but rendered them "fantastic and flamboyant," influencing indigenous artistic style for the following generations.

Seaweed's implementation of traditional artistic methods in a refined, technical way is what deemed him a master Kwakwaka'wakw artist. He carved totem poles, coppers, headdresses, drums, rattles, whistles, and masks as well as painting house fronts. He implemented ovoid and U-shapes and adorned his artworks with curving form outlines in keeping with Kwakwaka'wakw design principles. While the majority of Seaweed's works were made to function in native ceremonies, others were presented as gifts or available at modest prices. It was said Seaweed never turned down a commission request.

Similar to other Northwest Coast artists, Seaweed did not sign his artwork. However, it can be identified through his specific technique. Seaweed used tools, such as a compass and straightedge, in order to make precise and symmetrical compositions. His carving was so accurate that the surfaces are smooth without discrepancies. Small pencil lines that can still be seen on the back of objects inform of his process, while his tendency to paint the interior of his masks in addition to the exterior help researchers identify his work. Seaweed's artworks can be best identified by the eye technique. Seaweed created three concentric, symmetrical circles using a compass, and the point holes created by the compass can still be seen on surviving objects. The eye was often traced with a red eyelid line, setting him apart from his contemporaries.

Combined with Chief George Hunt Sr., Charley George Sr., and George Walkus, Seaweed helped to create a new Kwakwaka'wakw style in the 1920s. This group of artists, known as the "Kwakwaka'wakw Four," employed devices such as painting the base of a piece white and topping it with high-gloss enamel paints primarily in black and red, but also green, yellow, brown, and blue. Seaweed used native mineral pigments early in his career but later adopted commercial paints, a change that can be observed in Seaweed's remaining artworks.

There are more than 120 known and cataloged examples of Seaweed's work in existence today. Two-thirds of these are masks. His masks tended to fall into three categories: Hamatsa (Cannibal Raven), Atlakam (Spirits of the Forest), and Tsonoqua (Cannibal Grandmother). He is said to have created the majority of his artworks between 1940 and 1945. The earliest remaining mask is from 1917 and the latest from 1955. As of 1983, five masks are still in use by the Nak'waxda'xw tribe.

=== Hamatsa Crooked Beak Mask (1940s) ===
Willie Seaweed is best known for his Hamatsa Crooked Beak Mask, depicting the Crooked Beak monster of a mythical Kwakwaka'wakw narrative. It would have been used during one of the most important performances of the potlatch ceremony. A member of the Kwakwaka'wakw tribe would wear the mask titled upward, while dancing and moving the beak open and shut.

The mask is distinctive as the Crooked Beak monster because of the hooked crest above the jaw, its open mouth, and large red nostrils. This is Seaweed's most famous mask because of two elaborately curved forms added above and below the beak. These decorative additions, along with the mask's carving style, recognizable shapes, and pigments are evocative of Seaweed's personal style.

== Influence ==
The legacy of the Kwakwaka'wakw artists and Willie Seaweed, in particular, continued to progress at the hands of their offspring. Charley George Jr., Charley G. Walkus and Joe Seaweed continued this artistic and cultural tradition that has carried into today's new generation of Northwest Coast artists. Artistic methods were primarily similar, although the new generation sometimes reverted to natural pigments instead of commercial paints.

Joe Seaweed apprenticed under his father, as was custom for Northwest Coast artists, and, therefore, his style is very similar to Seaweed's. In fact, it is difficult to tell the artists apart at times. Father and son also worked together on some artworks. Charley G. Walkus' masks feature compass eye markings and smooth interiors reflective of Seaweed's methods. These contemporary artists are often referred to today as the Blunden Harbour School or Blunder Harbour-Smith Inlet Style.

== Selected collections ==
- Burke Museum of Natural History and Culture, Seattle, WA
- Canadian Museum of History, Gatineau, QC
- Central Washington University collection, Ellensburg, WA
- Denver Art Museum, Denver, CO
- Denver Museum of Nature and Science, Denver, CO
- Detroit Institute of Arts, Detroit, MI
- Glenbow Museum, Calgary, AB
- McMichael Canadian Art Collection, Kleinburg, ON
- Menil Collection, Houston, TX
- Microsoft Corporation, Redmond, WA
- Museum at Campbell River, Campbell River, BC
- Museum of Anthropology at UBC, Vancouver, BC
- Royal British Columbia Museum, Victoria, BC
- Seattle Art Museum, Seattle, WA
- Smithsonian National Museum of the American Indian, Washington, DC
- U'mista Cultural Society, Alert Bay, BC
