= David Neel =

Canadian artist

David Anthony Neel (born April 7, 1960) is a Canadian writer, photographer, and artist who is a member of the Kwakwaka'wakw First Nation of coastal British Columbia.

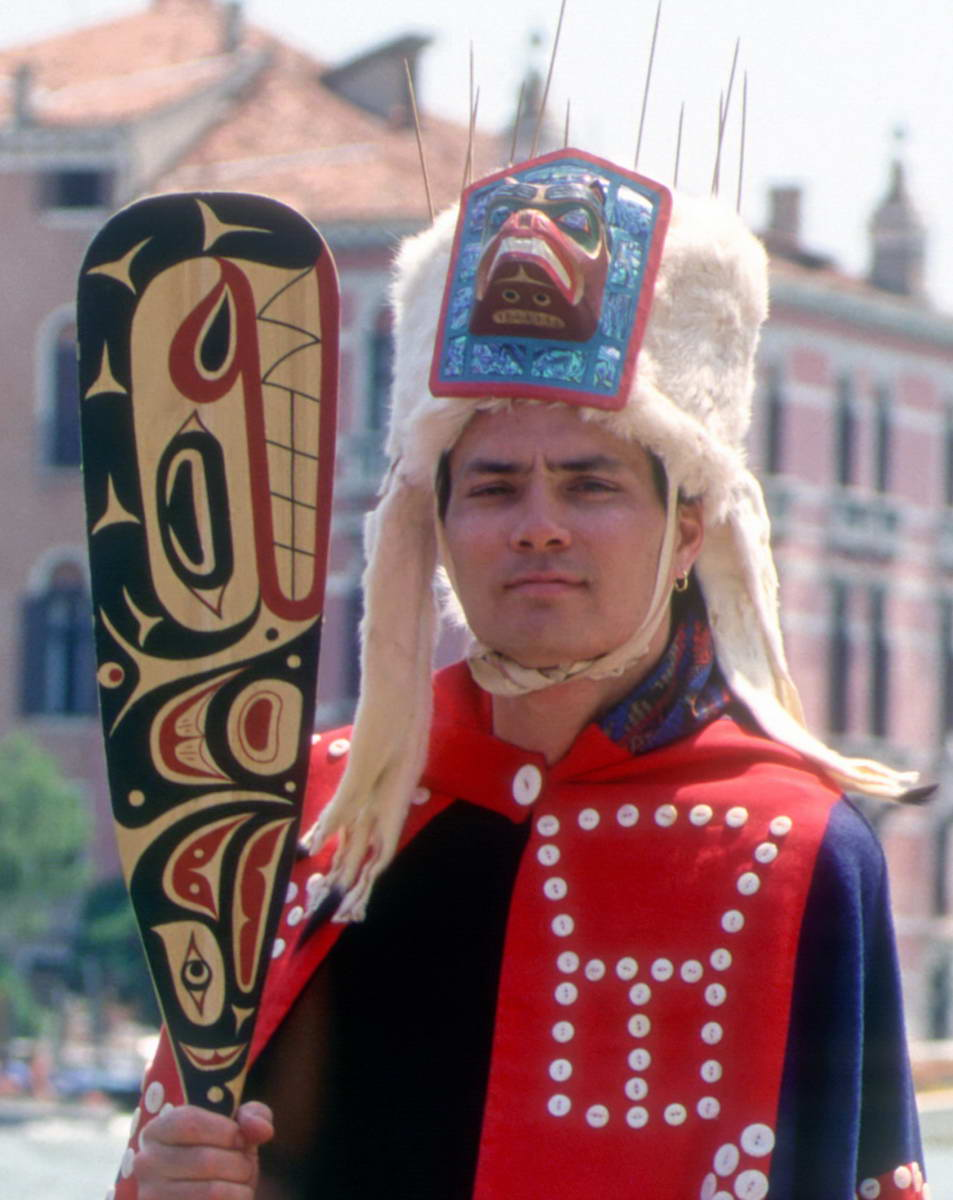

== Background ==
Neel was born on April 7, 1960, in Vancouver, British Columbia. He is a Canadian multi-media artist from Fort Rupert, British Columbia, known for his ability to work in number of media. He trained as a professional photographer in the United States for several years before returning to Vancouver in 1987. This was a turning point as he soon began working in the style of his father's people, the Kwakwaka'wakw.

From 1987 to 1989, he apprenticed with Kwakwaka'wakw carvers, Beau Dick and Wayne Alfred. He was following in the footsteps of his late father, Dave Neel Sr. (1937–1961), who was trained by his mother, Ellen Neel (1916–1966), who was trained by her uncle, Mungo Martin (1881–1962) and her grandfather, Charlie James (1875–1938). In this way he was carrying on a long-standing family tradition.

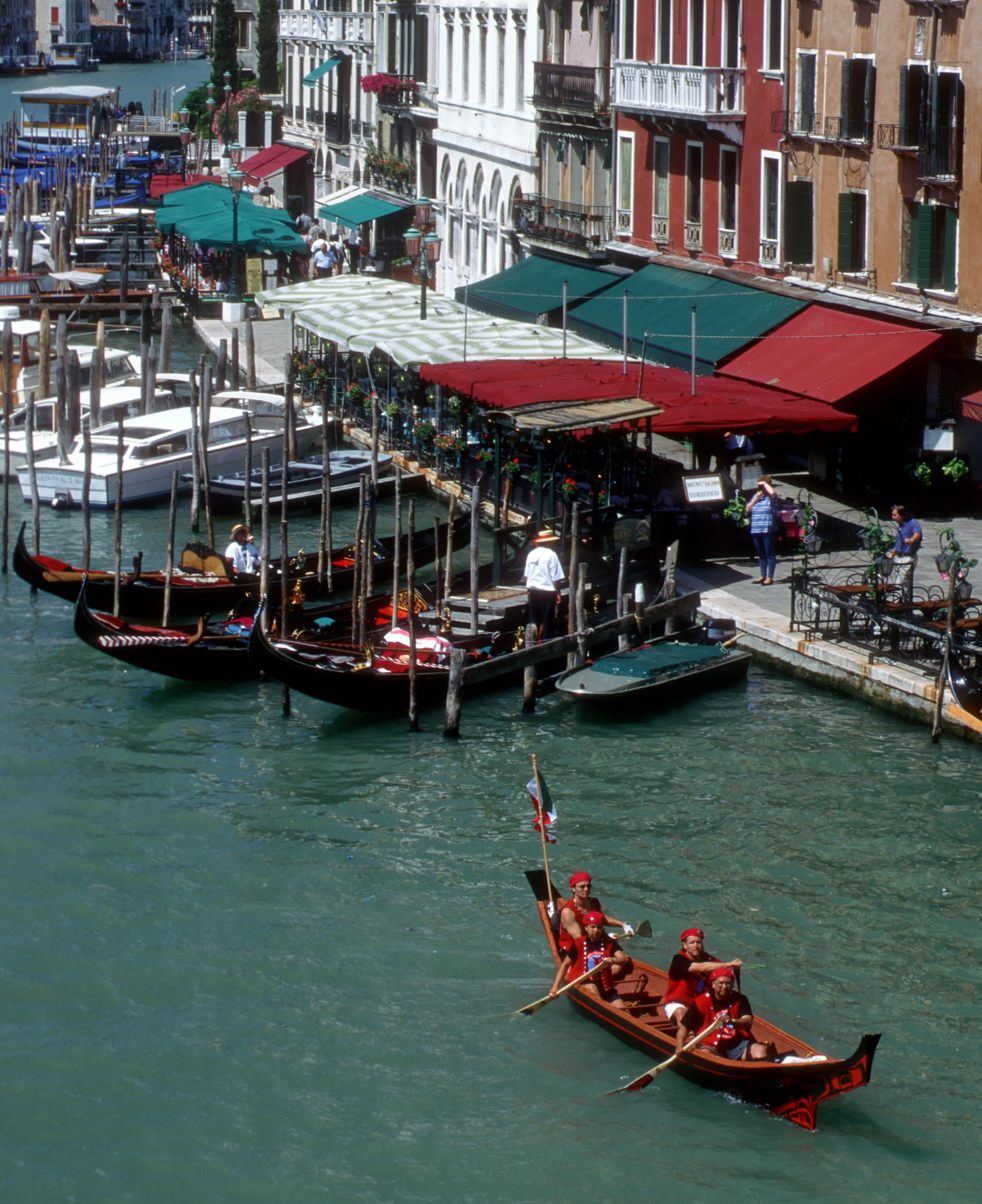
Native American dug-out canoe in Venice, Italy

== Artwork ==
In the 1990s, he went on to develop a highly personalized and controversial style of carving, using masks to comment and editorialize contemporary history and society. He came to believe that "tradition is a foundation to build upon, not a set of rules to restrain creativity." Examples of these masks are the "Mask of International Commerce," which was exhibited in London, England, for the Royal Opening of Canada House, and the "Mask of the Injustice System," which was exhibited at the 1999 Venice Biennale. For the Biennale, Neel exhibited his contemporary masks in a site-specific installation and did a performance on the Grand Canal using his 26-foot dugout canoe, the "Walas-Kwis-Gila" (Travels Great Distances). Following the publication of The Great Canoes in 1995, he carved two canoes; a 26-foot and 32-foot, which were used on a number of canoe journeys.

Also in the 1990s, Neel produced a number of limited edition prints, some of traditional Kwakwaka'wakw subjects and others of dealing with contemporary history, much like the masks. The best known of these is Life on the 18th Hole, which portrays a Mohawk warrior from the 1990 Oka Crisis in Quebec, Canada.

His original media, photography, resulted in two books about Native culture: Our Chiefs and Elders in 1992 and The Great Canoes in 1995. Like the prints and masks, these also dealt with contemporary Native history. He continued to work as a professional photographer, specializing in contemporary Native people. Major commissions include a series of portraits for the National Museum of the American Indian, New York, New York, in 1992, and a permanent installation of his portraits in the Mashantucket Pequot Museum, Groton, Connecticut (2001–2008).

In 1991, he began hand engraving jewelry in the Kwakwaka'wakw style, working in silver, gold and platinum. From 1998 to 2000, he did a series of elaborate gold and silver boxes, inspired by traditional bentwood cedar chests. He continues to work in jewelry, working primarily with gold and diamonds.

His work came full circle in 2000 when he began painting on canvas, the media of choice of his late father. The paintings, oil and acrylic paint on canvas, originally dealt with traditional legends in a highly personalized style. Following this series he evolved into abstractions and later stylized depictions of masks from museum collections. Neel continues to be an active artist, working primarily in jewelry and painting.

== Honours ==
In both 1987 and 1988, Neel earned the Mungo Martin Memorial Award. In 1991, Canada Council Explorations provided him with a grant for his Contemporary Mask Series. The Smithsonian Institution awarded him a Community Scholar Grant in 1992. The Way Home, his memoir of his experience reconnecting with his indigenous heritage, was shortlisted for the 2020 Hilary Weston Writers' Trust Prize for Nonfiction.

== Bibliography ==
- Neel, David (1991) To Speak for Ourselves: Portraits of Chiefs and Elders. Canadian National Archives. ISBN 0-662-58584-4.
- Neel, David (1992) Our Chiefs and Elders: Words and Photographs of Native Leaders. Vancouver: University of British Columbia Press. ISBN 0-295-97217-3.
- Neel, David (1995) The Great Canoes: Reviving a Northwest Coast Tradition. Vancouver: Douglas & McIntyre. ISBN 1-55054-185-4.
- Neel, David (2019) " The Way Home: David A Neel." Vancouver: UBC Press. ISBN 9780774890410.
