= Ida Halpern =

Austrian-Canadian ethnomusicologist

Ida Halpern, CBE, OC
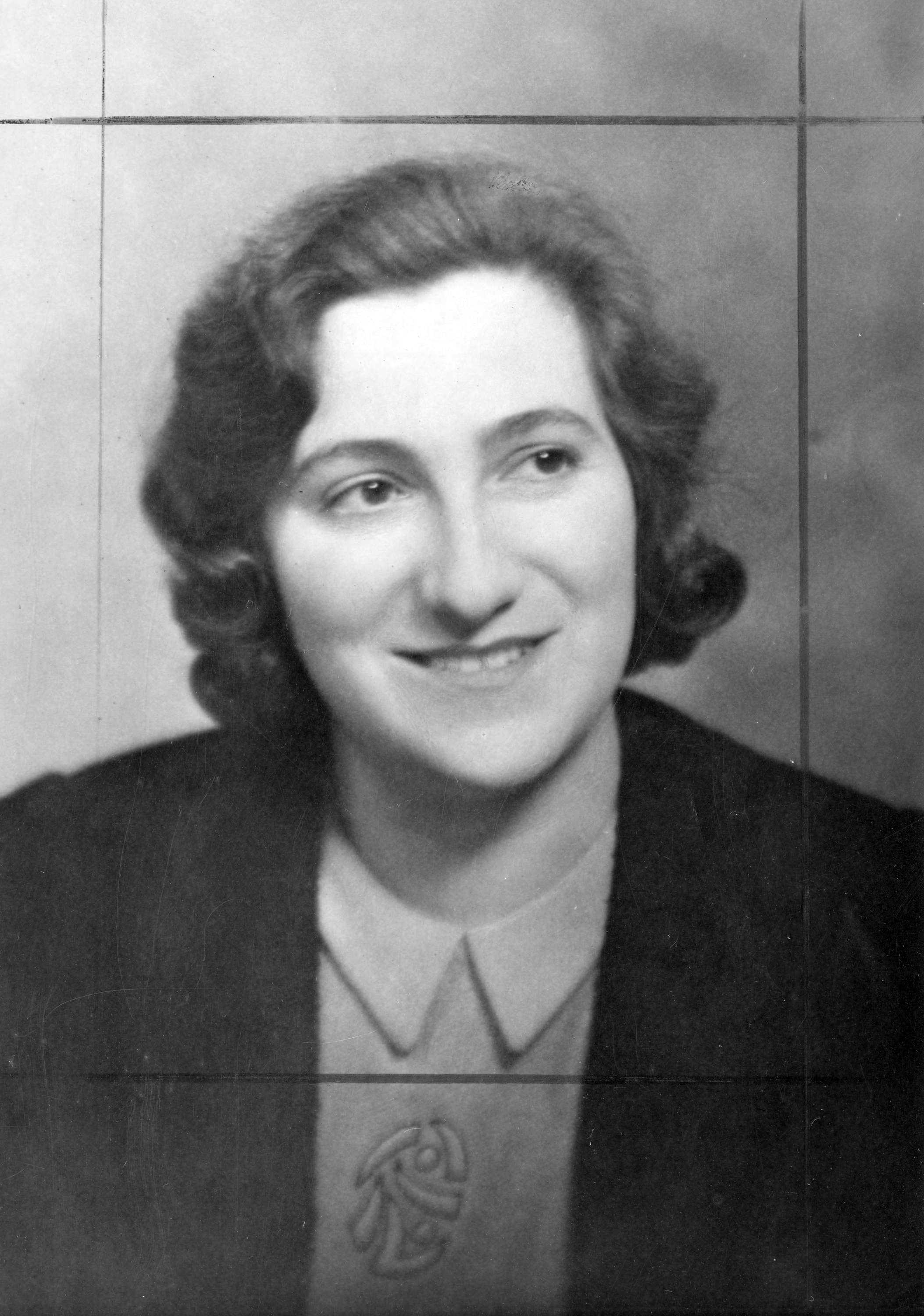
- Halpern in 1943
- Born: Ida Ruhdörfer; July 17, 1910; Vienna, Austria-Hungary (now Austria
- Died: February 7, 1987 (aged 76); Vancouver, British Columbia, Canada
- Citizenship: Canadian citizenship
- Education: Ph.D., musicology, University of Vienna, 1938
- Known for: Collecting, recording, and transcribing music of Native Americans of coastal British Columbia (particularly the Kwakiutl)
- Scientific career
- Fields: Ethnomusicologist
- Workplaces: University of Shanghai, University of British Columbia, Simon Fraser University
- Academic advisors: Robert Lach, Egon Wellesz, Robert Haas

Ida Halpern (née Ruhdörfer; July 17, 1910 – February 7, 1987) was a Canadian ethnomusicologist.

Halpern was born in Vienna, Austria-Hungary (now Austria). She arrived in Canada in order to flee Nazism in her native country (Anschluss), becoming a Canadian citizen in 1944. She worked among Native Americans of coastal British Columbia during the mid-20th century, collecting, recording, and transcribing their music and documenting its use in their cultures. Many of these recordings were released as LPs, with extensive liner notes and transcriptions. More recently, her collection has also been released digitally.

== Biography ==
Born as Ida Ruhdörfer, Halpern was raised mostly by her mother, Sabine, as her parents had separated in her early years. She began to learn piano at age six, and was instantly fascinated by the instrument. Halpern was enrolled first in public school, and then later in a private high school, where she studied the classical languages and German literature, practiced gymnastics, and furthered her interest in music. At age 19, she was struck with rheumatic fever, and was hospitalized for a year. Her heart never fully recovered, and as playing the piano more than casually would be too much of a strain, she turned her interests instead to musicology. In 1929, she entered the Musicological Institute at the University of Vienna, where she studied under Robert Lach, Egon Wellesz and Robert Haas. She married Georg Halpern, a chemist from the same university, in 1936, and moved with him to the Kingdom of Italy, where she completed her dissertation. The couple returned to Vienna within the year. They were deciding on where to settle permanently, with South America especially in mind, when Nazis entered Vienna as a result of the Anschluss. As soon as Halpern defended her dissertation and received her Ph.D. in musicology, the couple escaped to Shanghai, not only because it was one of the few places in the world that did not require a visa, but also because Georg's sister taught at a college there. Shanghai was having its own difficulties due to the Sino-Japanese War, and so after a short stint working at the university, the Halperns left for Canada. As they were not farmers (the career the government required of most immigrants at the time), and the immigration board was suspicious of money the Halperns had been lent for their move, their situation was precarious for a time. Germany was now at war with Canada, and Halpern could not communicate with her original home. The friend who had lent them the money met with the immigration branch members and assured them that the money was lent in good faith, and the Halperns were allowed to stay. They settled in British Columbia, and made Vancouver their permanent home.

Upon her arrival in Canada, Halpern became the first woman in the country to hold a doctoral degree in musicology. She was able to slowly rebuild her career in music from there. In the fall of 1940, she opened her own music studio, where she would give piano lessons. She took every opportunity that opened for her, and eventually she was able to create a UBC correspondence course in the "Fundamentals of Music. She taught the university's first class in music appreciation, and later its first class in ethnomusicology. Throughout her time in Vancouver, she became an active part of its music scene, co-founding Friends of Chamber Music in 1948, serving as its president for four years, its program chair for another seven, and as honorary president from 1952 to 1987. She was also involved with the Metropolitan Opera auditions for Western Canada, and the Vancouver Women's Musical Club.

Ida Halpern found great interest in the folk music of the First Nations of the Canadian west coast, as she felt that folk music bridged the gap between so-called "primitive" music, and music for art's sake. She died in Vancouver, in 1987.

== Research ==
Ida Halpern is most notable for her work with the First Nations people of British Columbia, recording their music, transcribing it, and documenting the way it was used. At first she did not pay particular attention to Native folk songs, and even her immigration records hinted she would be researching the music of Canadian farmers. After the performance of the first east-coast Native opera, Halpern realised that Canadians seemed largely unaware of Aboriginal Canadian song. She very much wanted Canadian music to find its own voice on the world stage.

Halpern initiated groundbreaking research for her time, "she began and conducted much of her fieldwork during a period when it was actually illegal for First Nations cultures to be celebrated, much less preserved." It was not until 1947 that Halpern really began to pursue ethnomusicology. When she began this collection process, it was widely thought that "Indians" had no music. "It took six years of intensive contact making before I was successful in convincing the Indians that they should sing for me their old authentic songs," she wrote. In many cases, these folk songs were very personal, and in some cases so sacred that they were not to be heard by the uninitiated, and as a result, the First Nations were not willing to "give" their songs to just anyone. She had to work closely with them and win their confidence over time. In her years working with different Native groups (mostly the Kwakwaka'wakw [sometimes called Kwakiutl] and Nuuchahnulth [previously called Nootka]), she collected upwards of 300 folk songs, many of which were made available on LPs from the Folkways Ethnic Library. Eight records in total were released, available in sets of two, released in 1967, 1974, 1981, and finally 1986. Her first success was with Chief Billy Assu, of the Kwakwaka'wakw. The younger generations that would usually inherit this culture generally wanted to be westernized, and as a result did not take the time to learn these cultural songs. It is said that once Assu realized that his music would die with him, he offered her "one hundred songs." After Halpern had recorded over 80 of Assu's folk songs, she was helped by Mungo Martin, also a Kwakwaka'wakw man, and an artist and songwriter. With him she recorded another 124 songs. As her collection expanded, she did analyses of them, and did her best to share what she had learned, though this was slowed somewhat by the work she was still doing with the university. While her works have sometimes been criticized for their "cultural material," especially in instances of her record's liner notes having misspellings, incomplete information, or the improper citing of a song-owner which "do[es] them a great disservice," it is widely agreed that her musical descriptions were largely flawless. She began to explore the fact that Native music was significantly different from European music, and that listening with "western" ears would not provide a full understanding. In order to understand the music she recorded, "Halpern had to free herself from the standard concepts and structures of Western music and notation. To analyze the beat, Halpern made use of medieval modal notation, which used stressed and unstressed beats. This showed that the beat fell into prescribed patterns, similar to iambus, dactyl, trochee, and anapaest." Through it all, she had much respect for Native music, and considered it extremely important. Later in her work she was able to use sonography to measure the nuances of the sounds used in the folk songs. She believed that music was a marker of the complexity of the society that made it, and sonograph data showed just how complex these songs were.

While Halpern was first and foremost a musicologist, she did rely on her First Nations informants for cultural explanations and translations of what she recorded. She is also notable for dispelling the belief that many of the sounds in Native folk songs were meaningless "filler" sounds. Some were specific words, while others were more onomatopoeic, indicating, for example, sounds of pain and animal sounds, and others still were choreographic cues. By the early 1980s, Halpern had identified 29 style characteristics of the folk songs she studied.

Despite the contributions Halpern made during her career, "the tributes paid to Halpern, however ring hollow beside the somber observation, that in reality her scholarship on First Nations musics has largely been overlooked by ethnomusicologists, anthropologists, and folklorists." These absences may be attributed to her research style which, "was derived from but only partially resembles, an Austro-German school of comparative musicology which was incompatible with popular North American ethnomusicology, anthropology, and folklore," according to Chen, the clash of four paradigms through differing theoretical backgrounds left Halpern "unduly ostracized." In addition, Halpern's name is strangely missing from the biography of Chief Martin, and the writings of George Clutesi, an artist she worked with. Regardless of these absences, there is physical evidence of her contributions. In 1984 Halpern donated the bulk of her collection (which amounted to over 80 file boxes of textual records, publications, moving images, photographs, sound recordings and interviews to the Provincial Archives of British Columbia. The remainder was donated to the archives of Simon Fraser University in Vancouver.

== Honors ==
The Ida Halpern Fellowship and Award, "to help support research on Native American Music of the United States and Canada" was established in her honour.

Halpern was granted a CBE by Queen Elizabeth II in 1957, and the Order of Canada in 1978.

She received an honorary degree from Simon Fraser University in 1978, and an honorary Doctor of Music degree from the University of Victoria in 1986.

In September 2017, the Royal BC Museum and Archives officially submitted the Ida Halpern collection for consideration for inscription on UNESCO’s International Memory of the World register. A new installation about the Halpern recordings is now on display in the Our Living Languages exhibition at the Royal BC Museum.

== See also ==
- Women in musicology
