= Himwitsa =

Himwitsa or Himwits'u is derived from the Nuu-chah-nulth language, translated as "Story Telling and the passing of knowledge from Elder to Youth".

In the Canadian First Nations this category includes the mythologies of those peoples, as well as fables about The Raven and other animals.

== See also ==
- Wakashan languages
- Nuu-chah-nulth
