= Mungo Martin =

Kwakwaka'wakw artist of Canada (1879–1962)

Mungo Martin (Nakapenkim)
- Born: c. 1879; Fort Rupert, British Columbia, Canada
- Died: August 16, 1962 (aged 82-83); Victoria, British Columbia, Canada
- Known for: Sculptor, Painter
- Movement: Northwest Coast art
- Patrons: Royal British Columbia Museum

Chief Mungo Martin or Nakapenkem (lit. Potlatch chief "ten times over"), Datsa (lit. "grandfather"), was an important figure in Northwest Coast style art, specifically that of the Kwakwaka'wakw Aboriginal people who live in the area of British Columbia and Vancouver Island. He was a major contributor to Kwakwaka'wakw art, especially in the realm of wood sculpture and painting. He was also known as a singer and songwriter.

== Personal life ==
Martin was born in the spring, though his birth was not recorded; he estimated that he was born around 1879 in Alert Bay or Fort Rupert, British Columbia, to parents of the Kwakwaka'wakw Nation. He was the son of Yaxnukwelas, a high-ranking native from Gilford Island. His mother was Q'omiga, also known by her English name, Sarah Finlay, who was the mixed-race daughter of a Kwakwaka'wakw woman and a Scottish man working with the Hudson's Bay Company. Martin's father died when he was in his teen years. His mother married Yakuglas, also known in English as Charlie James. Martin's mother wanted her son to become a woodcarver and song maker, and held rituals to ensure this future.

While still young, Martin regularly participated in the rituals, songs, arts, and traditions of the local Kwakwaka'wakw and North Coastal culture. This formed the basis of his knowledge of the Northwest Coast style, and he applied it to design, carving, and painting and lifelong song making. Martin was raised in the potlatch tradition practiced by the Kwakwaka'wakw, and all aspects of their culture.

Martin was a promoter of the culture in his later years, convening with other noted artists, such as Tom Omhid, Willie Seaweed and Dan Cranmer, in order to prepare novices for Kwakwaka'wakw ceremonies. He provided Ida Halpern, a Canadian ethnomusicologist, with 124 songs to help preserve his traditions for new generations.

Martin became a commercial fisherman at one point to support himself financially.

He would later marry Abayah Martin, also an artist, who specialized in weaving ceremonial curtains and aprons.

All his life Martin made songs, sang them and recorded them with the Hawthornes and others. He had an interest in music in general and in folksong. He learned and sang songs from other tribes, such as the Navajo, which he learned from his relative Bob Harris. The latter had met these other native peoples at the Chicago World Exhibition. Martin also learned Japanese folk songs from other Kwakwaka'wakw who had sailed to Japan on sealing vessels.

== Professional life ==
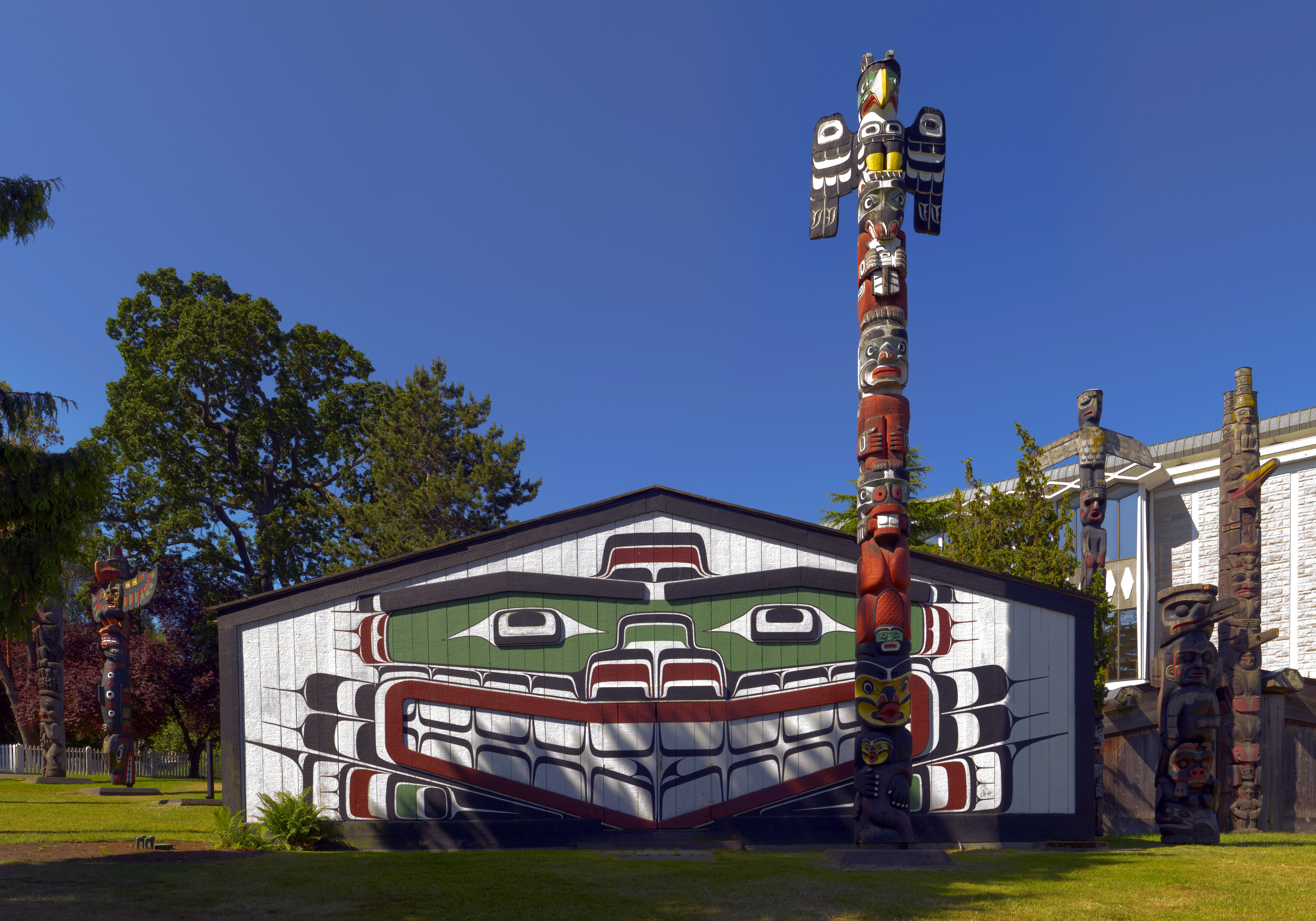
Wawadit'la, also known as Mungo Martin House, a Kwakwaka'wakw "big house", with heraldic pole. Built by Chief Mungo Martin in 1953. Located at Thunderbird Park in Victoria, British Columbia."Thunderbird Park – A Place of Cultural Sharing". Royal British Columbia Museum.

As a boy Martin had been apprenticed as a carver to a paternal uncle. His stepfather Charlie James, a noted Northwestern artist, was his principal influence in honing his natural talent. Martin developed as one of the first traditional artists to adopt many types of Northwest Coast sculptural and painting styles. He carved his first commissioned totem pole in Alert Bay c1900, and titled it "Raven of the Sea."

Martin also restored and repaired many carvings and sculptures, totem poles, masks, and various other ceremonial objects. He gained fame for holding the first public potlatch since the governmental potlatch ban of 1885. He was awarded with a medal by the Canadian Council.

In 1947, Martin was hired by the Museum of Anthropology at UBC for restoration and replica work. During this time, Martin lived on the university campus, and continued to paint and carve small works during the night.

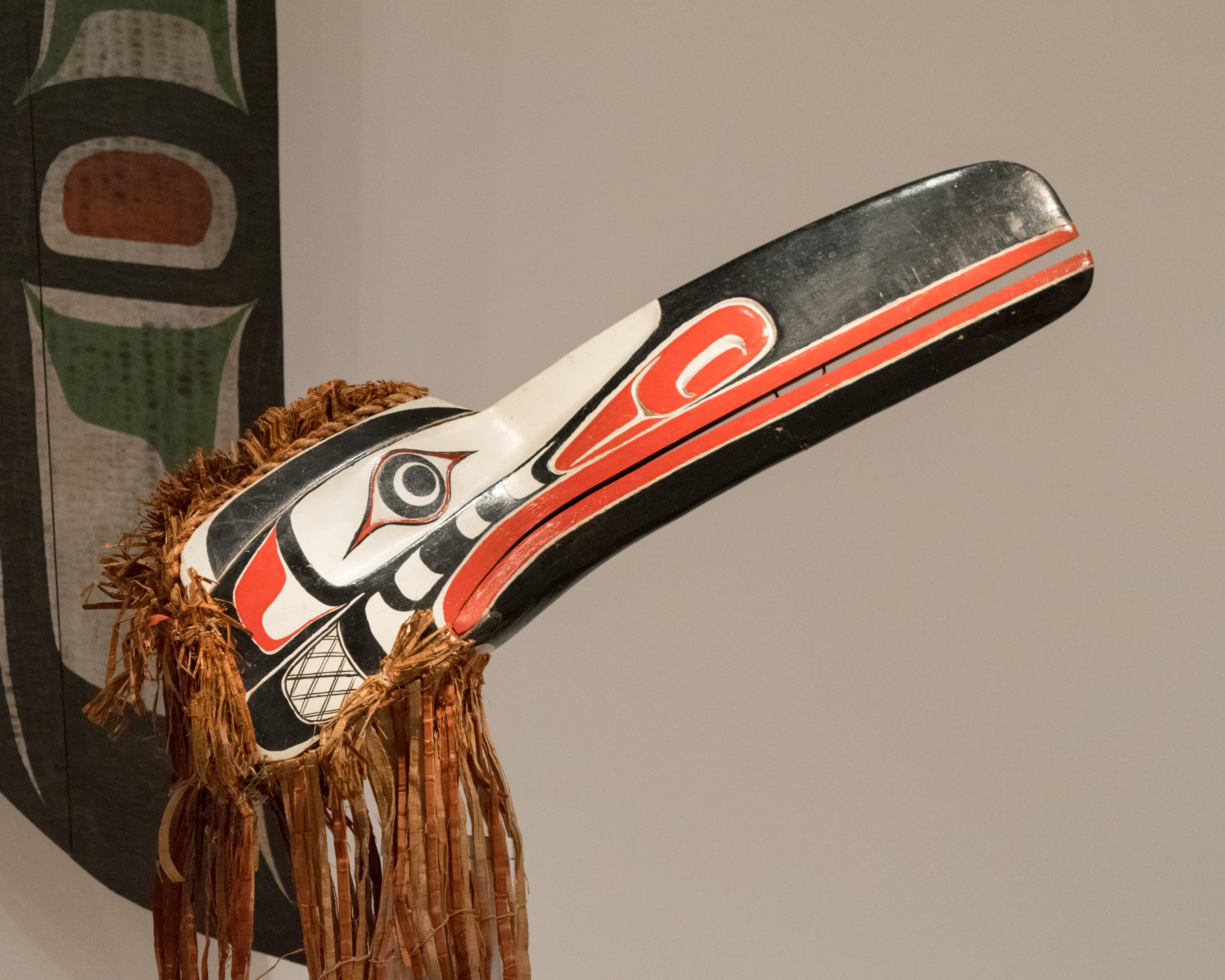
Gwaxwiwe' hamsiwe' (mask of the raven man-eater) by Mungo Martin at the Seattle Art Museum

Later, Martin was hired in 1952 by the Royal British Columbia Museum in Victoria, British Columbia, to create works of Northwest Coastal Art as display pieces and examples. The final result was a huge totem pole, carved out of cedar, standing 160 feet tall. It was raised in 1956 and remained standing until 2000. He also constructed Wawadit'la, a Kwakwaka'wakw "big house", at Thunderbird Park in front of the museum. During this time he and American anthropologist Bill Holm became fast friends and Martin designed a Kwak'waka'wakw big house on the coast in Washington State.

Martin was also the designer and principal carver of the famous Totem Pole in Windsor Great Park in the United Kingdom. The Totem Pole was a gift from the people of Canada to HM The Queen in June, 1958. Standing 100 feet high, there is one foot for every year, and marks the centenary of British Columbia, which was named by Queen Victoria and proclaimed a Crown Colony on November 19, 1858. It is now the Pacific Coast Province of Canada. The figures on the pole reading from the top are, Man with large hat, Beaver, Old Man, Thunderbird, Sea Otter, The Raven, The Whale, Double headed Snake, Halibut Man and Cedar Man. Each figure represents the mythical ancestor of a clan. The pole was carved from a single log of Western Red Cedar and weighs 27,000 pounds. It was cut from a tree 600 years old from the forests of Haida Gwaii, 500 miles north of Vancouver.

When Martin went to work for the museum in Victoria, his son David and his family, and relatives Henry and Helen Hunt (Helen was Martin's wife's granddaughter) and their family joined him in living in James Bay near Thunderbird Park and the focus of the work to be done. His son David, and Henry Hunt, and even Henry's son Tony who was only twelve when the families engaged in this undertaking, became apprentices. Martin trained his son David in his craft but David died in 1959. Henry's sons Stanley Hunt and Richard Hunt are also professional carvers.

It's rumoured Martin also instructed the famed Haida sculptor Bill Reid although it's more likely they spent time together on some project at MOA at U.B.C. and the association was then a limited one. Doug Cranmer, who became an artist of some considerable note, a unique approach to his craft added to his knowledge of things traditional placing him permanently on a level of talent Mungo would be proud of, spent time with his old relative too; Doug was the grandson of Martin's wife Abaya'a, and was the son of Martin's first cousin, and so brother, Dan Cranmer. Mungo was also a mentor to the artist Godfrey Stephens, (painter and sculptor) whom he first met in Victoria in the 1950s.

== Later work and death ==
Mungo Martin continued to work on his carvings in his later years. One of his last works was the Canadian totem, gifted by Canada to Mexico to commemorate the latter's 150th anniversary of independence.

Martin was significant in the Northwest Coastal Art scene for his vast amount of work and actual sculpting.

He died on August 16, 1962, at the age eighty-three in Victoria and was taken on a Canadian Navy ship to be buried in Alert Bay. His wife Abaya'a died in the following year.

== See also ==
- Kwakwaka'wakw
- Willie Seaweed
- Ellen Neel
- Ida Halpern
