= Ellen Neel =

Kwakwaka'wakw carver (1916–1966)

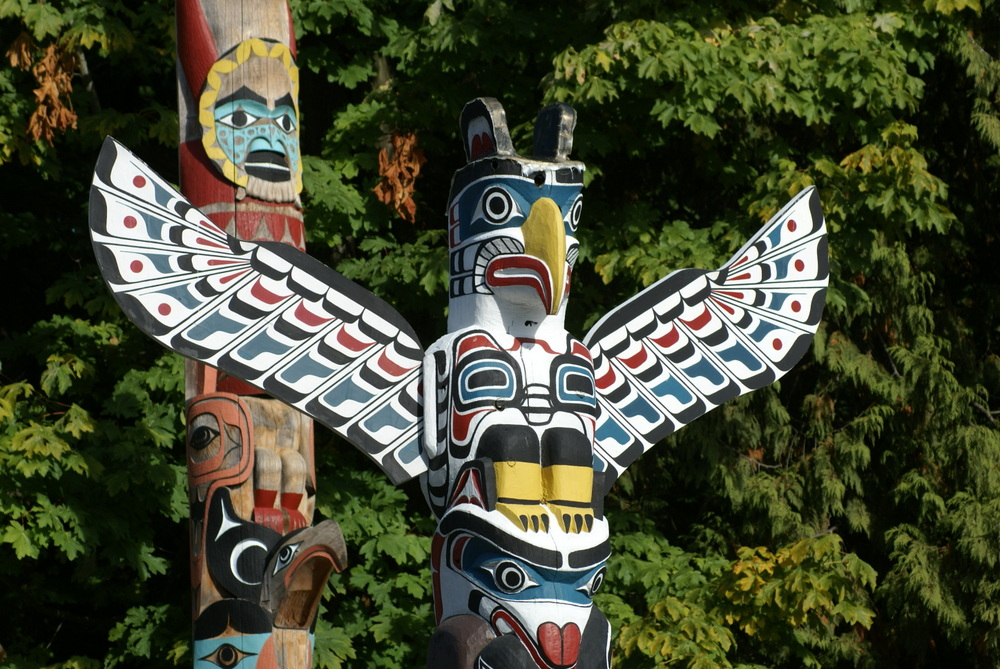
Foreground, the top of Kakaso'Las Totem Pole.

Ellen Neel (1916–1966) was a Kwakwakaʼwakw artist woodcarver and is the first woman known to have professionally carved totem poles. She came from Alert Bay, British Columbia, and her work is in public collections throughout the world.

Scholar Priya Helweg writes, "Until Ellen Neel emerged as a professional carver in the late 1920s no women are named as carvers in the literature." Neel inspired subsequent First Nation women, such as Freda Diesing (Haida) and Doreen Jensen (Gitksan), to take up carving.

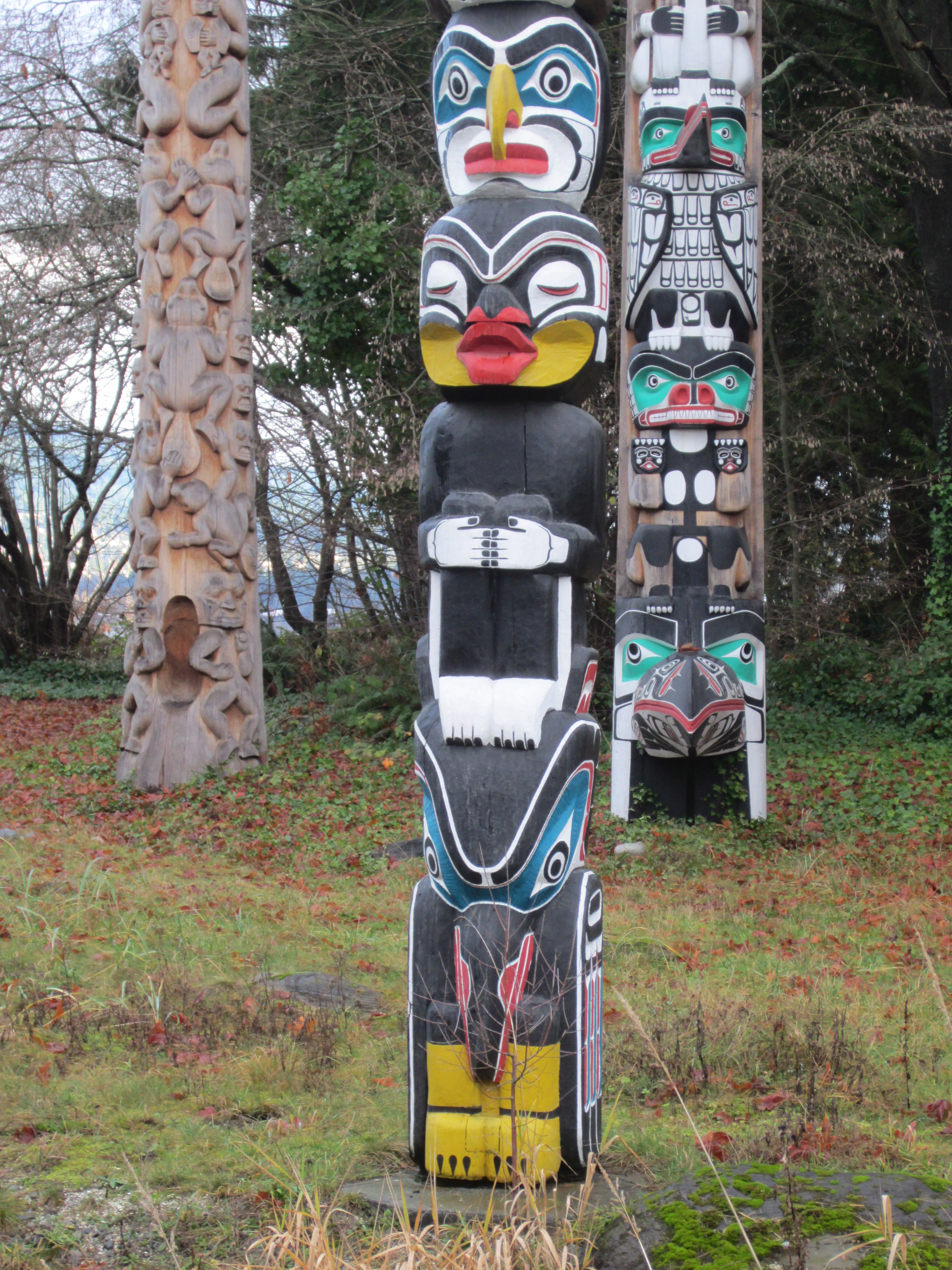
Kakaso'Las Totem Pole.

== Early life ==
Ellen May (née Newman) Neel (Potlatch name Kakaso'las) was born on November 14, 1916, in Alert Bay, British Columbia. Her parents were both mixed race and she was a member of the Kwakwaka'wakw tribe. Neel learned Northwest carving from her maternal grandfather, Yakuglas/Charlie James, a noted totem carver and from her uncle, the famed sculptor Mungo Martin. While attending St. Michael's residential school Charlie arduously taught Neel line work, old styles, stories and dedication. Her grandfather's education and her hard work led to Neel selling work by the age of 12.

In 1938, Neel married the well-liked roustabout and metal smith, Ted Neel. They moved to Vancouver, and together had seven children. Neel was a stay at home mom, but still completed a few carvings for friends. Then things changed dramatically after Ted suffered a severe stroke. They needed money and Ted no longer could fully support the family. They decided Neel's carving would become an official full-time business. Ted handled the business side of it while Neel designed, carved, and painted.

== Career breakthroughs ==
The family worked together seeking out a subsistence, until Neel completed the Totemland Pole for the Totemland Society (a promotional group for Vancouver) which served as a financial breakthrough. As a speaker in 1948 at the Conference on Native Indian Affairs, Neel furthered her career and became an established artist. After the conference the Parks Board gave her a studio in Stanley Park where she established Totem Art Studios.

In 1948, Neel completed the restoration of several historic totems for the University of British Columbia. She traditionally dedicated a 16 foot-totem to the university in 1950, completing the foyer of a hotel. Soon her sons completed the bulk of carving while she painted production work of six-inch to 18-inch poles for the reliable tourist trade. Though the small poles were the family's bread and butter Neel was able to work on large artistically freeing totems such as the pole commissioned in 1953 for a museum in Denmark.

In 1955, Woodward's Department Store commissioned Neel to create five totem poles for an Edmonton shopping mall. These were returned to the coast in the 1980s, and Neel's son, Robert, restored one, the Kakasoʼlas pole, that would later stand in Stanley Park.

In 2017, Neel's work was shown in an individual exhibition at the University of Victoria's Legacy Art Gallery. Her work Cedar Mask was exhibited with the Hearts of Our People exhibition of Native women artists at the Minneapolis Institute of Art in 2019.

== Children ==
The children became an integral part of the business developing skills and striking out on their own such as the Neel's son, David. The Neels moved from Vancouver to South Burnaby, then White Rock, and finally Aldergrove, British Columbia. The children began their own lives, but would send money as things were beginning to get hard for the Neels. Their son John stayed with them and would help Neel carve. Robert "Bob" Neel became a carver in his own right.

== Death ==
By 1961 Ted and Ellen were consistently dealing with health problems. In September 1961, their son Dave died in a car crash. Then by 1965 the market was declining for Neel. Everything was deteriorating quickly and Neel died in 1966.

== Legacy ==
Ellen Neel played a crucial role in establishing Native arts as a viable way for Natives to support their communities and continue their heritage. In 1985 the UBC Museum of Anthropology erected one of the totem poles they had commissioned from Neel in Stanley Park, where it is still on display. The totem pole she donated to the University of British Columbia was recreated by master carvers and rededicated in 2004 with an elaborate ceremony presided over by the Kwakwaka'wakw Chief of the Heiltsuk Nation and Master of Ceremonies Edwin Newman.

Ellen's grandson David Neel is a carver, jeweler, painter, photographer, and author active today in British Columbia.

== Exhibits ==
- Ellen Neel: The First Woman Totem Pole Carver, (2017), University of Victoria Legacy Art Galleries, Victoria, British Columbia, Canada.
- Hearts of Our People: Native Women Artists, (2019), Minneapolis Institute of Art, Minneapolis, Minnesota, United States.
- Curve! Women Carvers on the Northwest Coast, (2024), Audain Art Museum, Whistler, British Columbia, Canada.
- We Come From Great Wealth. Ḵaḵaso’las—Ellen Neel and the Totem Carvers, (2025), Museum of Anthropology at UBC, Vancouver, British Columbia, Canada.
