= Dzunukwa =

Kwakwaka'wakw deity

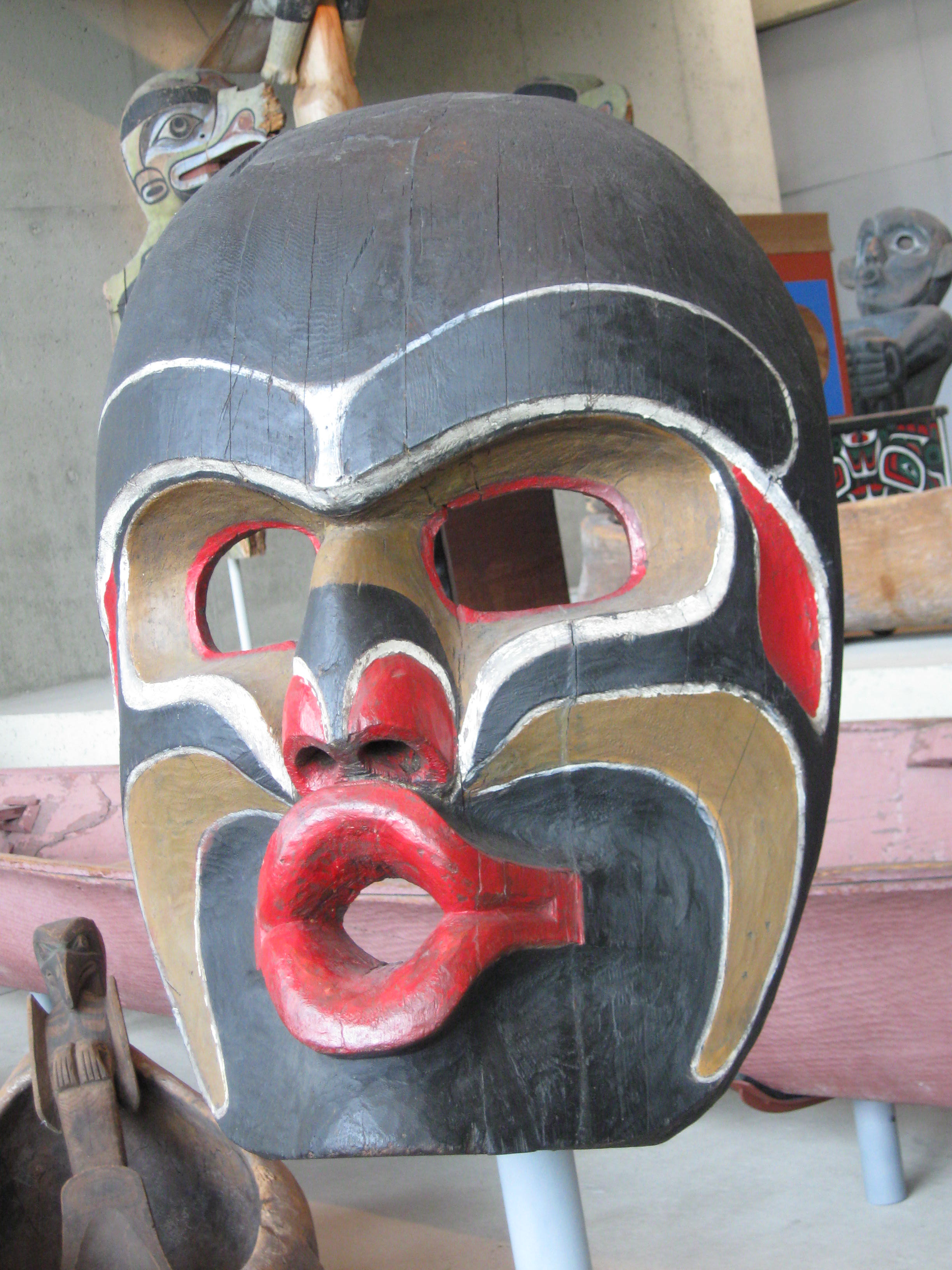
Mask of Dzunukwa face (Museum of Anthropology at UBC)

Dzunuḵ̓wa (pronounced "zoo-noo-kwah"), also Tsonoqua, Tsonokwa, Basket Ogress, is a figure in Kwakwakaʼwakw mythology and Nuu-chah-nulth mythology.

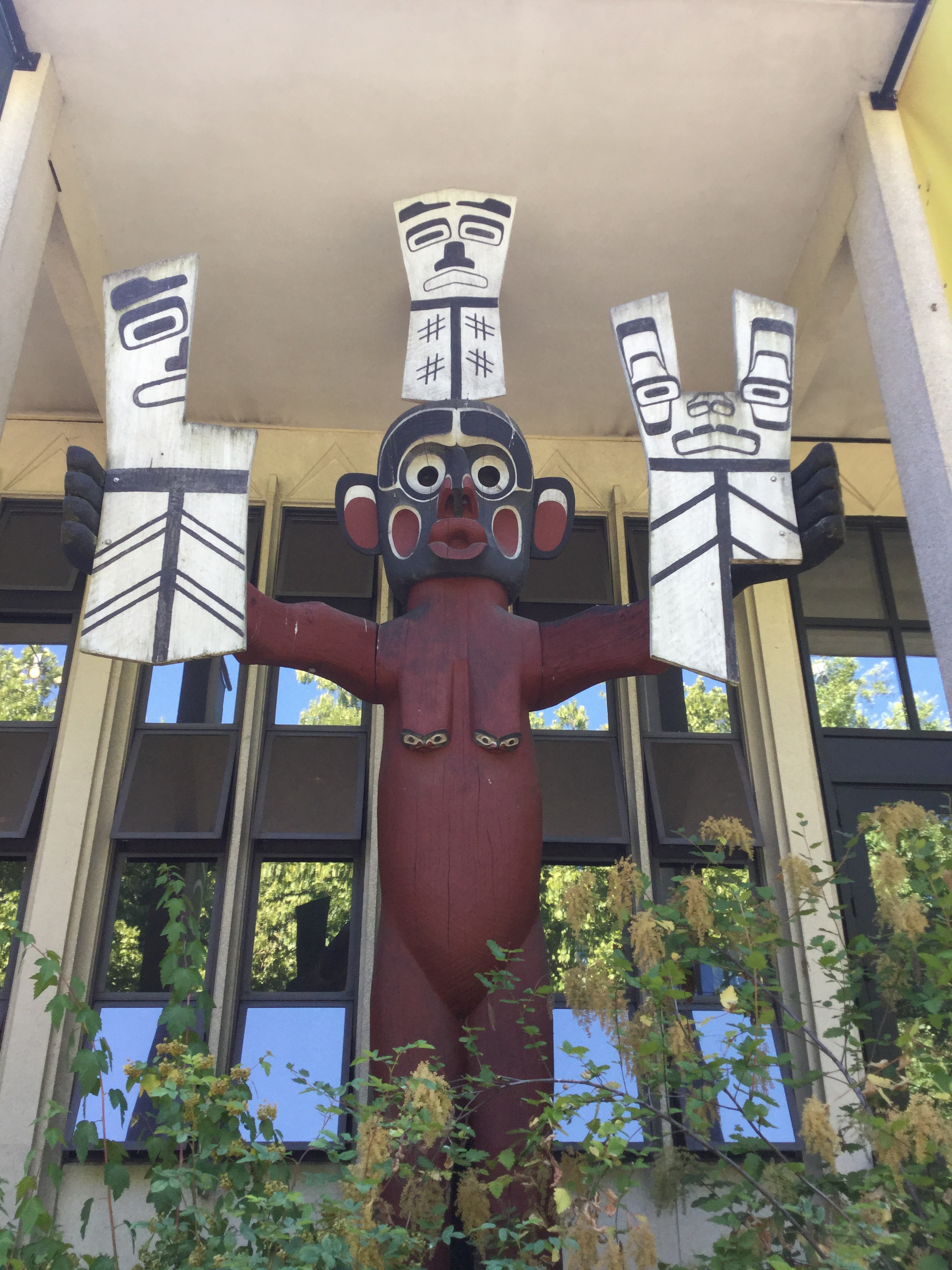
Dzunukwa holding tináa (copper shields) outside the Burke Museum of the University of Washington, Seattle, WA

== Description ==
She is an ancestor of the Namgis clan through her son, Tsilwalagame. She is venerated as a bringer of wealth, but is also greatly feared by children, because she is also known as an ogress who steals children and carries them home in her basket to eat.

Her appearance is that of a naked old monster, black in colour, with long pendulous breasts. She is also described as having bedraggled hair. In masks and totem pole images she is shown with bright red pursed lips because she is said to give the call "Hu!" It is often told to children that the sound of the wind blowing through the cedar trees is actually the call of Dzunuḵ̓wa.

Some myths say that she is able to bring herself back from the dead (an ability which she uses in some myths to revive her children) and regenerate any wound. She has limited eyesight, and can be easily avoided because she can barely see. She is also said to be rather drowsy and dim-witted. She possesses great wealth and will bestow it upon those who are able to get control of her child.

In one myth a band tricks her into falling into a pit of fire. The tribe burned her for many days until nothing was left, which prevented her from reviving herself. It is said that the ashes that came off this fire turned into mosquitoes.

== Role in the Kwakwaka'wakw potlatch ceremony ==
At the end of a Kwakwaka'wakw potlatch ceremony, the host chief comes out bearing a mask of Dzunuḵ̓wa which is called the geekumhl. This is the sign that the ceremony is over.

== See also ==
- Sasquatch
- Kwakwaka'wakw mythology
