= Laura Wee Láy Láq =

Sto:lo artist

Laura Wee Láy Láq (born 1952) is a Sto:lo ceramics sculptor, educator, recognized cultural caretaker, and member of the Tzeachten First Nation (Ch'iyaqtel people). Her ancestral name is Lumlamelut. Wee Láy Láq is recognized for hand-built ceramics that utilize firing techniques involving burnishing and sawdust firing. Many of Wee Láy Láq’s vessels take the basic form of the olla, while others draw inspiration from natural forms, including spiky seedpods and flower buds in bloom. Wee Láy Láq believes working with clay gives her a sense of harmony and peace.

Wee Láy Láq is a recipient of the 2015 Fulmer Award in BC First Nations Art, and the 2015 BC Creative Achievement Award for First Nations’ Art.

== Education ==
Laura Wee Láy Láq studied fine arts with Fred Owen, founder of the Ceramics Department at Douglas College in New Westminster, British Columbia, from 1970 to 1973, and then ceramics at the Vancouver School of Art, where she graduated with an honors degree in 1977. In the late 1970s, she studied Northwest Coast design with Chief Tony Hunt.

== Career ==
In 2004, Wee Láy Láq's ceramic artworks were included in the exhibition Hot Clay: Sixteen West Coast Ceramic Artists at the Surrey Art Gallery, curated by Carol E. Mayer.

In 2010, Wee Láy Láq was part of the exhibition Border Zones: New Art Across Cultures at the University of British Columbia's Museum of Anthropology, in parallel with the 2010 Winter Olympics.

In 2023, Wee Láy Láq was an exhibiting artist in the exhibition Apparition Room curated by Lee Plested at The Western Front to commemorate the organization's 50th anniversary.

In 2026, Wee Láy Láq was part of the exhibition The Structure of Smoke at the Morris and Helen Belkin Art Gallery, Vancouver, Canada.

== Collection ==
Ceramic sculptures by Laura Wee Láy Láq's are included in permanent collections of the Vancouver Art Gallery, the Winnipeg Art Gallery, Surrey Art Gallery, the Richmond Art Gallery in Richmond, British Columbia, the Museum of Anthropology at the University of British Columbia, and the Nanaimo Art Gallery.

== See also ==
- Laura Wee Lay Laq in conversation with Marc Johnson in Chilliwack on July 13, 2019
