= Visible storage =

Method of maximising public access to museum and art collections

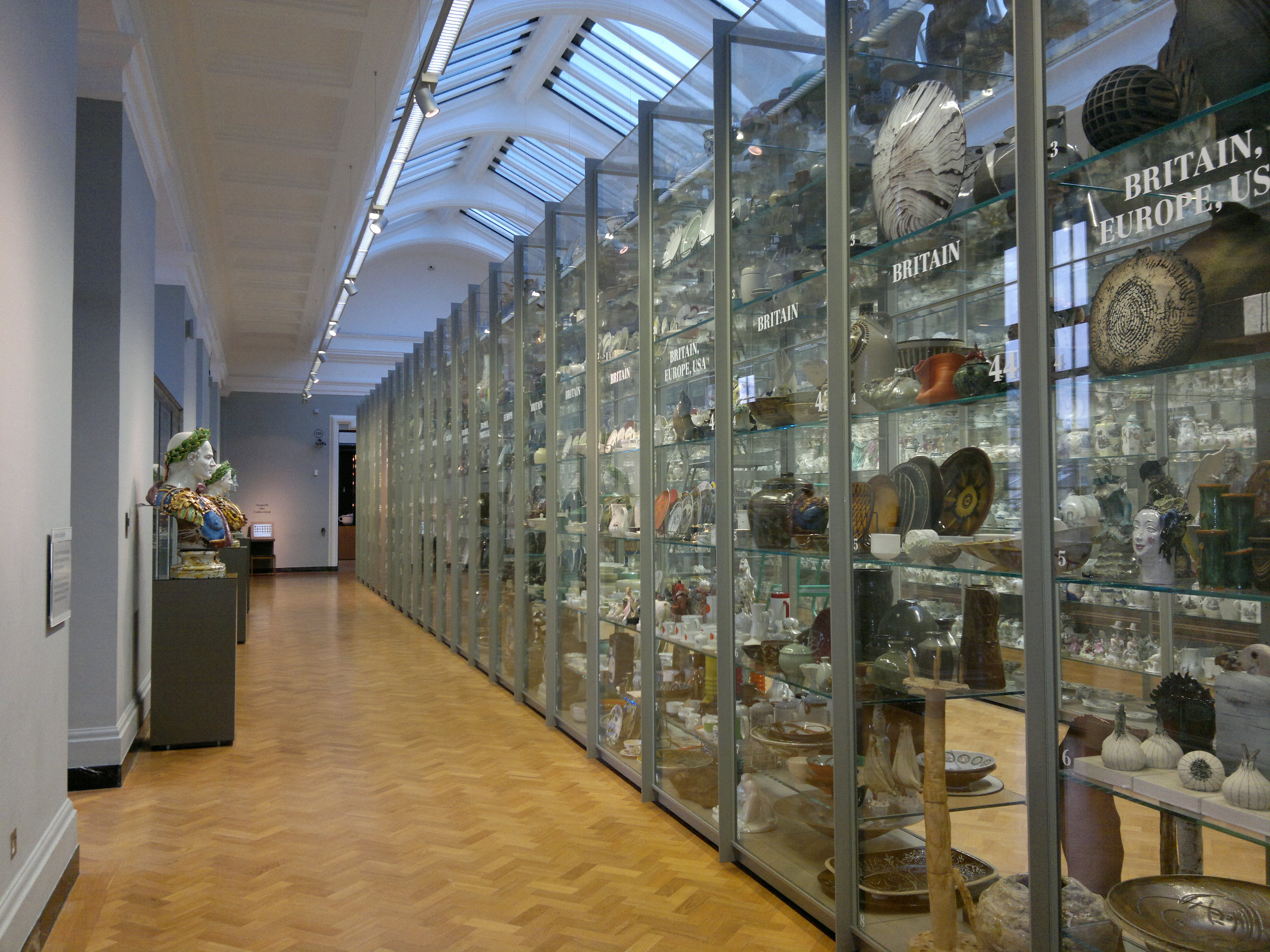
Visible storage in the porcelain galleries, Victoria & Albert Museum.

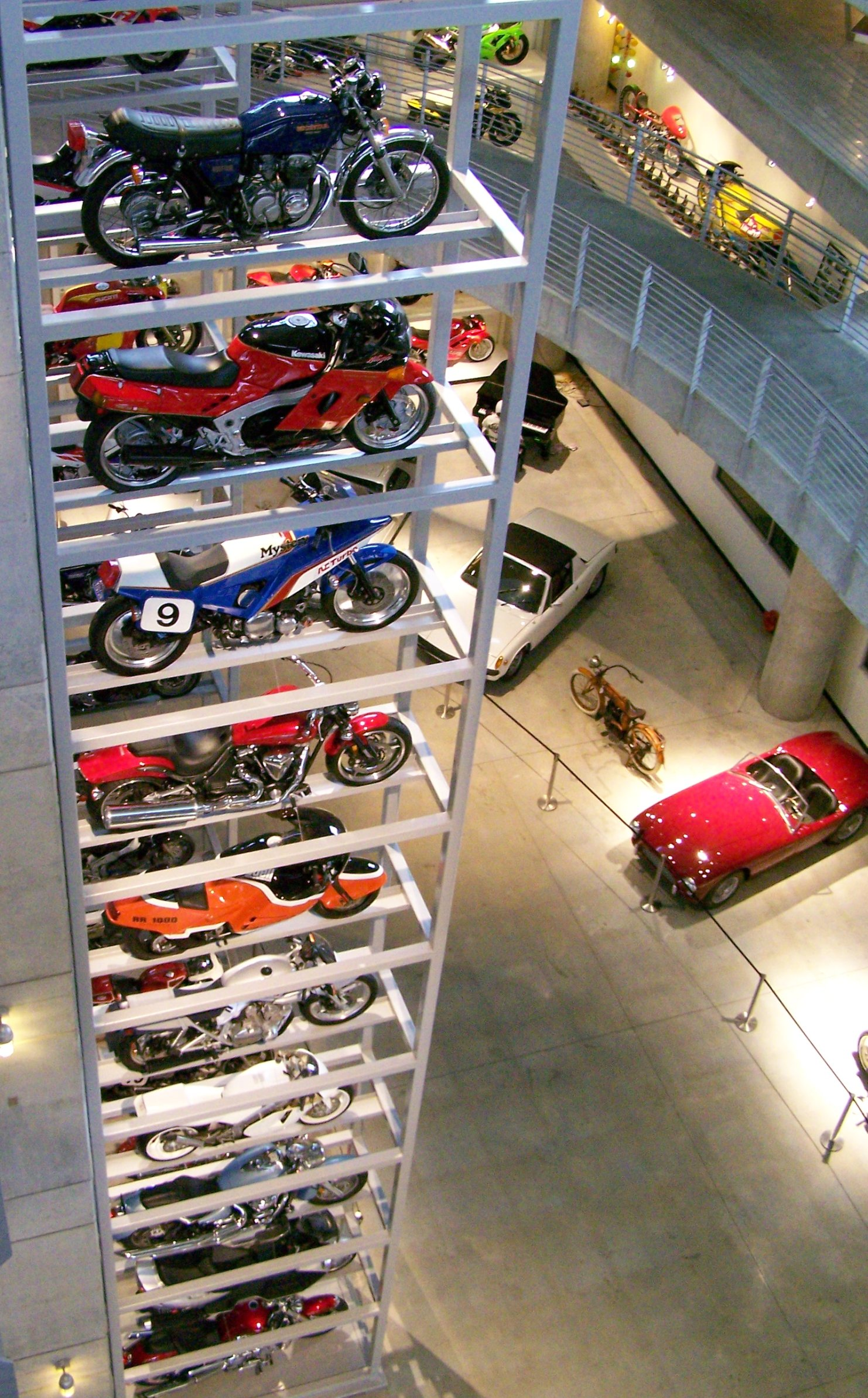
Motorcycle stack display at the Barber Vintage Motorsports Museum.

Visible storage is a method of maximising public access to museum and art collections that would otherwise be hidden from public view: many museums and galleries have over 90% of their collections in storage at any one time. The approach has been widely adopted by institutions ranging from the Metropolitan Museum of Art in New York, to London's Victoria & Albert Museum, as well as in many smaller collections.

Visible storage cases tend to be densely packed and with less explanatory material than in conventional displays. In addition, they may exceed head height making smaller objects difficult to see. The cases are often located in spaces that were previously unused or unsuitable for conventional display cases. The cases may be curving, cylindrical, packed closely together or positioned down the centre of existing galleries.

Claimants to have originated the idea include Audrey Hawthorn who implemented the idea at the Museum of Anthropology at the University of British Columbia in the 1970s and the Strong Museum in Rochester, in 1982.

The Metropolitan Museum of Art was one of the first large institutions to use visible storage when it created the Henry R. Luce Center for the Study of American Art in 1988.

The Victoria & Albert Museum adopted the idea in their refurbished ceramics galleries, opened in 2010 and, subsequently, on a larger scale, at V&A East Storehouse, a new building designed for the purpose by Diller Scofidio + Renfro, which opened in 2025.. Another recent example of a museum building designed around the principle of visible storage is the Museum Boijmans Van Beuningen's publicly accessible depot, designed by MVRDV and completed in 2020.
