= Walter C. Koerner Library =

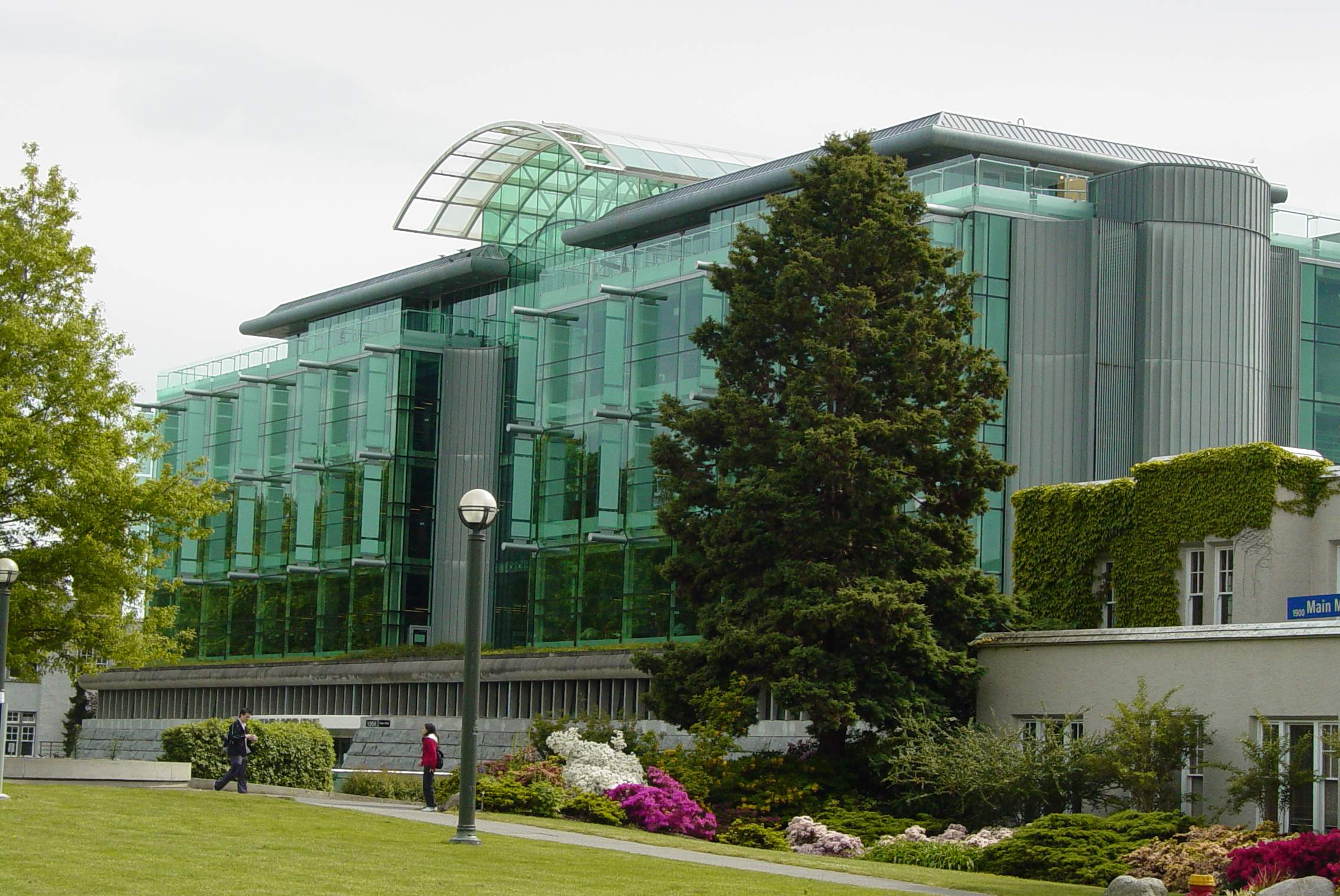
- Exterior of Walter C. Koerner Library
- 49.26664°N 123.25519°W
- Location: 1958 Main Mall, Vancouver, British Columbia, Canada
- Type: Academic library
- Branch of: University of British Columbia Library

Other information
- Website: koerner.library.ubc.ca

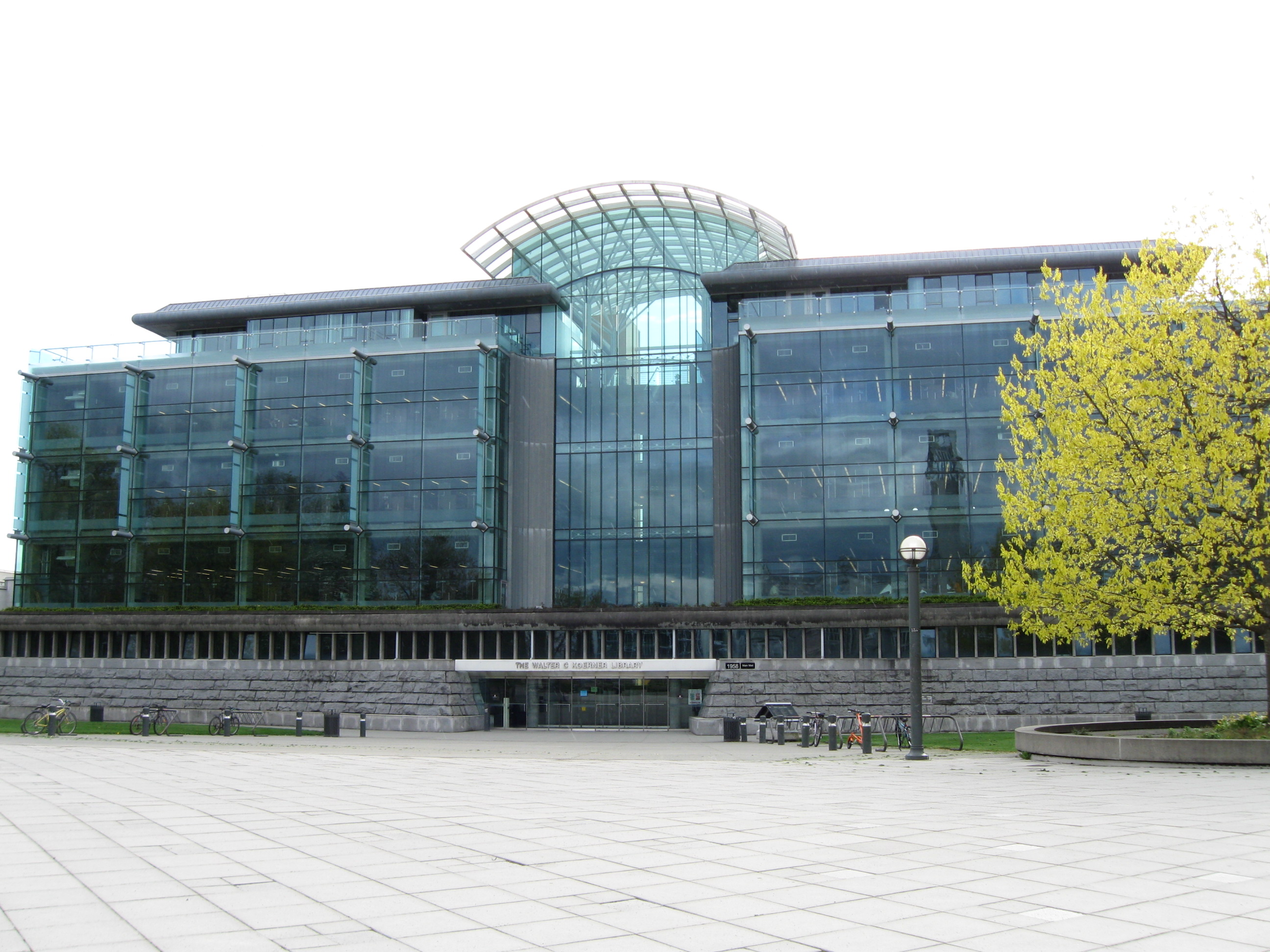
Koerner library in 2009

The Walter C. Koerner Library is an academic library at the Vancouver campus of the University of British Columbia. The library is named after Walter C. Koerner, a Canadian businessman and philanthropist. Walter C. Koerner Library forms the main academic and general resource library collection at the University of British Columbia.

The library was designed by architect Arthur Erickson and opened in 1997.
