= Audrey Hawthorn =

Canadian anthropologist (1917–2000)

- Born: Audrey Genevieve Engle; 25 November 1917
- Died: 18 November 2000 (aged 82)

Audrey Genevieve Engle Hawthorn (25 November 1917 – 18 November 2000) was a Canadian anthropologist and author. She is known for her work establishing the Museum of Anthropology at the University of British Columbia and creating the concept of visible storage as a means of displaying art in museums.

== Early life and education ==
Hawthorn was born in Lewellen, Nebraska on 25 November 1917. She grew up in New York City, where she was exposed to anthropology through people that visited her parents' home. She received both a B.A. (1939) and an M.A. (1941) from Columbia University, and while there studied under Ralph Linton.She studied anthropology at Yale University from 1940 until 1941, and there she met and married one of her fellow anthropology students, Harry Hawthorn.

== Career ==
With a fellowship from Yale University, Audrey and Harry spent one year working in Bolivia, and published the outcome of their work on social stratification in 1948. They moved to Sarah Lawrence College, where they remained until they left for the University of British Columbia in 1947. Anti-nepotism rules at the University of British Columbia prevented Audrey from working on the staff due to her husband's position as head of anthropology, so she accepted a volunteer position as curator. She was an honorary curator until 1968. Hawthorn would later note that she did not want an official position because she was raising children.

After her husband retired in 1967, she joined the faculty of the anthropology department, thereby becoming the first woman appointed to the department.

=== Establishing the Museum of Anthropology ===
The collection at the University of British Columbia initially held 2,500 pieces, some of which came from Frank Burnett who had donated the pieces to the university in 1927. Hawthorn and her husband started visiting Aboriginals in 1947 to learn about their community, and they particularly sought out those involved with carving and weaving. Starting in 1949 they hired Kwakwaka'wakw people to work on totem poles that had been relocated to the University of British Columbia. Hawthorn went on to acquire works from Aboriginal artisans to bring them to the museum, which included work from the Haida artist Bill Reid. The Museum of Anthropology first opened to the public in 1949 as a space in the basement of the university's library. Her husband Harry was its first director.

As Hawthorn continued to expand the museum's collection, it became large enough that only one-tenth of it could be displayed at any one time. As she sought to display the pieces in the collection, she established the concept of visible storage that became a model for other museums displaying their collections.

One artist who Hawthorn worked with at the museum was Mungo Martin whom she commissioned to carve new totem pole. Martin became a friend of the Hawthorns, and would go on to encourage others artists to sell their works directly to the museum. Hawthorn would later published essays on Martin's work with Wilson Duff.

The museum opened in a permanent space in 1976, at which point Hawthorn retired as curator, though she would continue as a volunteer.

=== Other exhibitions ===
Hawthorn also coordinated exhibits of the university's collection at other locations. An early example was the 1959 exhibit, Arts of the Raven that was held at the Vancouver Art Gallery and centered on art originating from the Northwest Coast of Canada. In 1967 Hawthorn published the Art of the Kwakiutl Indians and other Northwest coast tribes. Since there was limited space to display the pieces from the collection, her goal was to use the book to share the collection with others. When Jean Drapeau learned of the collection through her book, he invited her to exhibit the collection in Montreal at the Expo 67 world's fair. Since Hawthorn had no staff, she and university students did the preparations for the Montreal exhibit. The exhibit ended up as more than 5000 artifacts that were displayed for two years in Montreal.

=== Teaching ===
Hawthorn also taught classes on tribal arts and museum studies. She started teaching in 1948, first as seminars. In 1963 she started formal program of classes that students were able to take for credit.

== Honors and awards ==
Hawthorn received honorary degrees from Brandon University in 1984 and the University of British Columbia in 1986 In 1985 she was elected a member of the Order of Canada.

== Selected publications ==
- Hawthorn, Audrey (1967). Art of the Kwakiutl Indians and other Northwest coast tribes. University of British Columbia; University of Washington Press, Vancouver, Seattle. ISBN 9780295740881.
- Hawthorn, Audrey (1972), People of the potlatch, [Vancouver]: Vancouver Art Gallery and the University of British Columbia, OCLC 82357824
- Hawthorn, Audrey (1993). A labour of love : the making of the Museum of Anthropology, UBC; the first three decades, 1947–1976. Vancouver, B.C.: UBC Museum of Anthropology. ISBN 978-0-88865-124-2. OCLC 29841192.
- Hawthorn, Audrey; University of British Columbia Museum of Anthropology (1994). Kwakiutl art. Seattle, Vancouver: University of Washington Press; Douglas & McIntyre. ISBN 978-0-295-96640-3. OCLC 230762733.
