= Walter Koerner =

Canadian businessman (1898–1995)

Walter Charles Koerner
- Born: July 21, 1898; Nový Hrozenkov, Moravia, Austro-Hungarian Empire
- Died: July 21, 1995 (aged 97)
- Occupations: Businessman, philanthropist
- Awards: Order of Canada; Order of British Columbia

Walter Charles Koerner, CC OBC (July 21, 1898 – July 21, 1995) was a Canadian businessman and philanthropist.

Born in Nový Hrozenkov, Moravia, he emigrated to Canada in 1938 after serving in World War I. His family had been involved in the forest industry and continued the tradition in Canada founding the Alaska Pine and Cellulose company. After the company was sold to Rayonier Canada in 1954, Koerner became the president and chairman and retired in 1972.

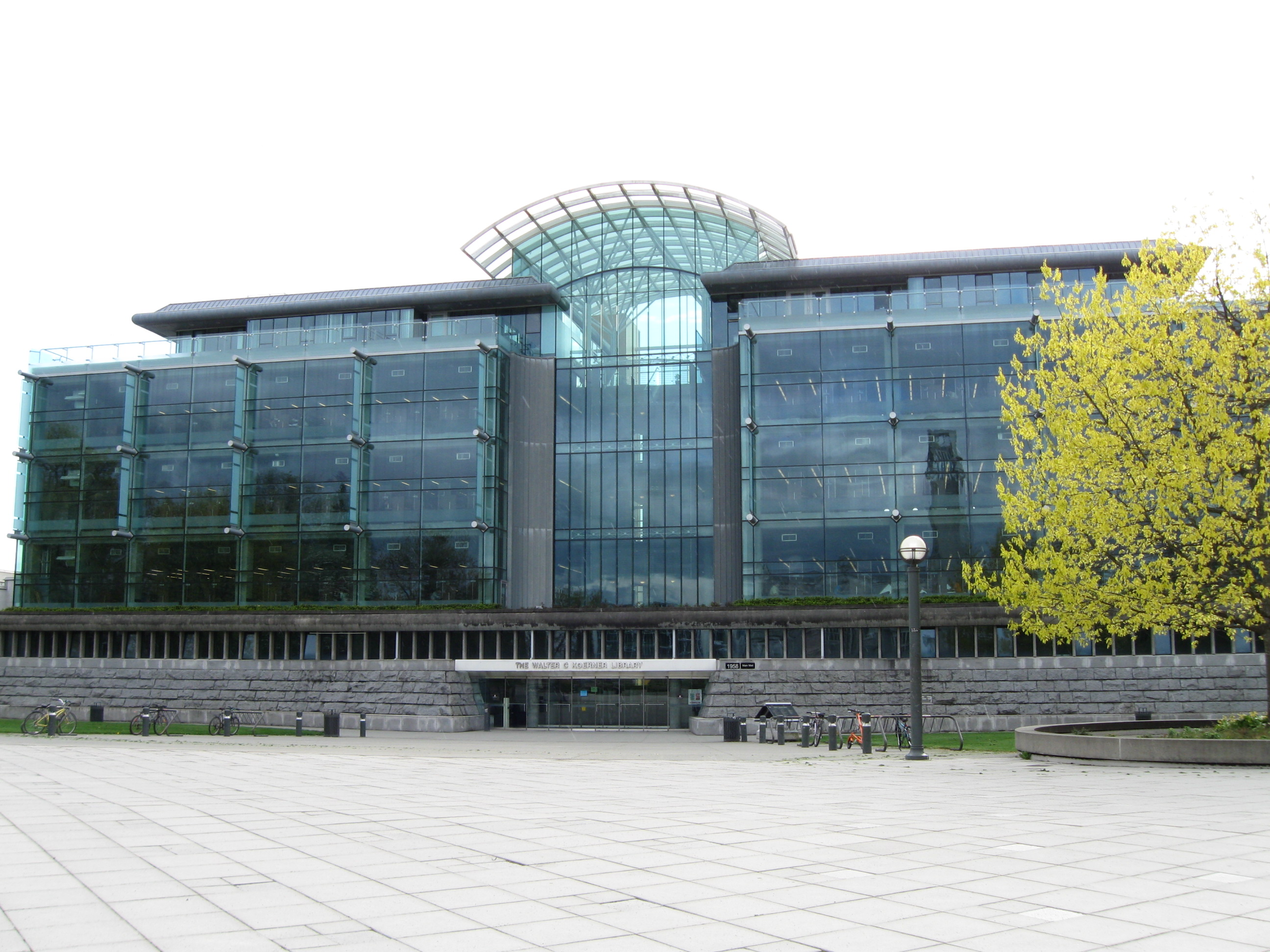
The Walter Koerner library

Koerner had a long association with the University of British Columbia including helping the University library, chairing the Board of Governors from 1968 to 1972, and donating his European ceramic art collection to the University in 1987 or 1988. His collection now occupies a small wing of the Museum of Anthropology at UBC. The Walter C. Koerner Library, opened in 1997, is named in his honour. Dr. Walter Koerner was also the serving chairman of the UBC Health Services Centre from 1971 to 1980.

In 1967, he was made a Companion of the Order of Canada. In 1990, he was awarded the Order of British Columbia. Walter Koerner died on his 97th birthday in 1995.
