= Carol E. Mayer =

Canadian museum curator and academic

- Education: BA, University of British Columbia, 1974; PhD, University of Leicester, 1996
- Organization(s): Museum of Anthropology at UBC; International Council of Museums (ICOM); Canadian Museums Association (CMA); BC Museums Association (BCMA); Northwest Ceramics Foundation
- Known for: Curator and educator

Carol E. Mayer is a Canadian museum professional, curator, and educator. She has curated over 50 exhibitions and worked with the British Columbia Museums Association (BCMA), Canadian Museums Association (CMA), and the International Council of Museums (ICOM).

Mayer has taught museum studies and material culture courses at the University of British Columbia (UBC), University of Victoria, and Emily Carr Institute of Art and Design. She co-founded and directed the Museum Studies Certificate Program at UBC (1996-1997).

== Career ==
In 1974 Mayer completed a Bachelor of Arts, majoring in Anthropology, at the University of British Columbia, and in 1996 she received a Ph.D. from the University of Leicester in Museum Studies.

Mayer is a Research Fellow in Ceramics at the Museum of Anthropology at UBC and associate to the Department of Anthropology (UBC). She co-founded and directed the Museum Studies Certificate Program at UBC (1996-1997) and in 2005, she sat on a committee to establish the university's African studies program.

== Curatorial work ==
In 2024, Mayer opened a new permanent installation of British Columbian ceramics at MOA, From the Land.

In 2020, she curated Playing with Fire: Ceramics of the Extraordinary at the MOA at UBC, which featured work by 11 British Columbian artists across three generations. This exhibition was motivated by the urge to "wipe away any craft-based, little-brown-pot stereotypes that might still adhere to the ceramics medium."

Additionally, she curated the Koerner European Ceramics Gallery at the Museum of Anthropology, the only permanent installation of European ceramics in Western Canada.

== Recognition ==
Awards won by Mayer include:

- Basil Stuart-Stubbs Book Prize (2026)
- Canadian Crafts Federation Laureate of the Robert Jekyll Award (2024)
- Craft Council of BC Citizen of Craft Award (2023)
- Manu Daula Award for outstanding achievements in the study of Pacific arts (2019)
- BC Museum Association Outstanding Achievements award (on behalf of the MOA) (2014)
- UBC President's Service Award for Excellence (2011)
- Canadian Museum Association Award for Outstanding Achievement. (2011)
- International Achievement Award, ICOM Canada (2008)
- Smithsonian Fellowship in Curatorial Studies (2003)

== See also ==
- Canadian Museums Association
- International Council of Museums
- Museum of Anthropology at UBC
