= Harry Hawthorn =

Canadian anthropologist and museum curator

Harry Bertram Hawthorn, OC (15 October 1910 – 29 July 2006) was a Canadian anthropologist and museum curator. He is well known for his work with the coastal First Nations of British Columbia.

Hawthorn was born in Wellington, New Zealand, the son of Josiah Henry Hawthorn and Henrietta Louisa Hansen.

He was married twice, firstly to Aileen, then to Audrey; he and Audrey had two children.

He studied at Victoria University College (B.Sc. & M.Sc.), then Auckland University College (B.A.), (the degrees were issued by the University of New Zealand), and Yale University (Ph.D.). His first fieldwork experiences were with the Māori of New Zealand and in Peru.

He joined the faculty of the University of British Columbia in 1947 and in 1949, he began a study on the Doukhobors living in BC. He founded the UBC anthropology program, championed the legitimacy of Northwest Coast Indian art as high art, and, along with his wife and colleague Audrey Hawthorn, was the driving force behind the establishment of UBC's world-class Museum of Anthropology. He was an early champion of Northwest Coast artists such as Mungo Martin and Bill Reid.

He received the Order of Canada in 1973.

His papers are held at the University of British Columbia.

== Publications ==
- “The Maori: a study in acculturation” (1944)
- “The Aymara Indians of the Lake Titicaca Plateau, Bolivia” (with Bernard Joseph Siegel and Raphael Patai) (1947)
- “The Doukhobors of British Columbia” (1955)
- “Cultural Evolution Or Cultural Change: The Case of Polynesia” (with Cyril S. Belshaw) 1957
- “The Indians of British Columbia” (1958)
- “A Survey of the Contemporary Indians of Canada” (1966)

== Bibliography ==
- Hawthorn, Audrey (1993) A Labour of Love: The Making of the Museum of Anthropology, UBC: The First Three Decades, 1947-1976. Vancouver: UBC Museum of Anthropology.
