= Museum of Anthropology at UBC =

Museum in Vancouver, Canada

Museum of Anthropology

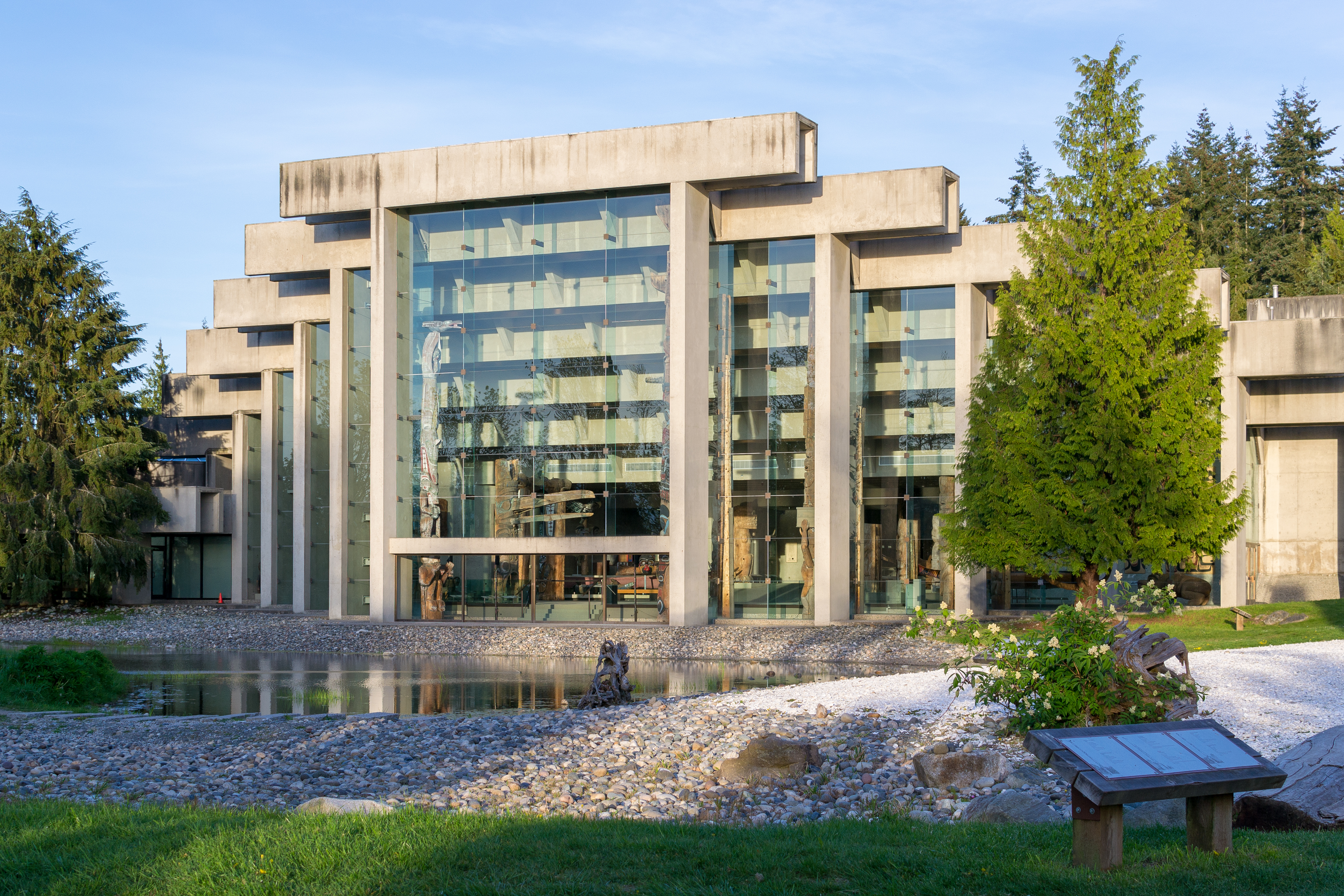
- The Museum of Anthropology at UBC from the west

- Location in Vancouver
- Established: 1947
- Location: 6393 NW Marine Dr, Vancouver, British Columbia, Canada
- Coordinates: 49.269366°N 123.259596°W
- Type: First Nations culture
- Visitors: 189,661 (2016)
- Director: Dr. Susan Rowley
- Website: moa.ubc.ca

The Museum of Anthropology at the University of British Columbia (UBC) campus in Vancouver, British Columbia, Canada displays world arts and cultures, in particular works by First Nations of the Pacific Northwest. As well as being a major tourist destination, MOA is a research and teaching museum, where UBC courses in art, anthropology, archaeology, conservation, and museum studies are given. MOA houses close to 50,000 ethnographic objects, as well as 535,000 archaeological objects in its building alone.

== History ==
The Museum's beginnings lie in the University of British Columbia's acquisition of the Frank Burnett Collection in 1927. These works, in addition to two important Musqueam house posts that were acquired and donated by the UBC graduating class of 1927, a number of salvaged totem poles acquired from Canadian anthropologist Marius Barbeau, and the Buttimer collection of First Nations basketry, were displayed in the basement of the UBC Main Library. The museum was officially founded in 1947. Harry Hawthorn served as the first director of the new museum, with his wife, Audrey Hawthorn, serving as its first curator.

In 1971, the museum received funds from the Government of Canada and UBC to begin construction of a building. In 1976, the new building, designed by renowned Canadian architect Arthur Erickson, opened under new director Michael M. Ames, who served from 1974 to 1997. Walter and Marianne Koerner's 1975 donation of their extensive collection of Northwest Coast First Nations art to the museum formed a large part of the building's contents.

In 1997, Ruth Phillips became museum director. In 2002, Ames returned as acting director. Anthony Shelton was director from 2004 until 2021. In 2021, Susan Rowley, a long-time curator at the museum, was appointed director for a three-year term.

On March 9, 1999, Canada Post issued a stamp commemorating the Museum, designed by Barbara Hodgson, based on photographs by William McLennan and Jacqueline Gijssen, and prominently featuring the sculpture The Raven and the First Men by Bill Reid. The 46¢ stamps are perforated 13.5 and were printed by the Canadian Bank Note Company.

In 2022, the Museum was closed for 18 months for seismic upgrade and was reopened on June 13, 2024.

== Building ==
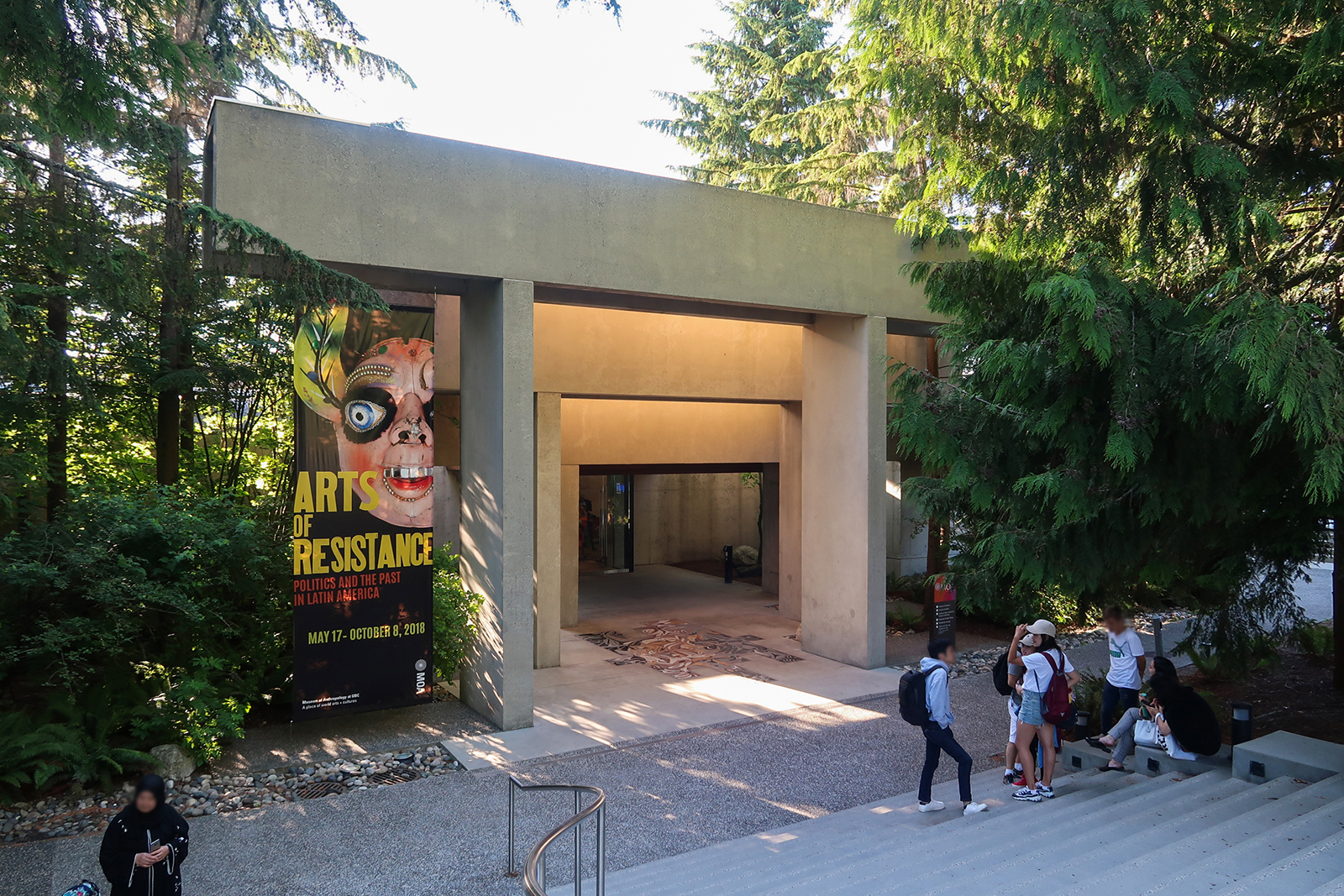
Concrete exterior at the museum entrance. Concrete is the primary material used to build the museum.

The museum is located at 6393 NW Marine Dr, on the campus of the University of British Columbia. MOA and UBC lie in the Point Grey campus lands, which are not officially part of the City of Vancouver. The Arthur Erickson's building was designed in 1976, inspired by the post-and-beam architecture of northern Northwest Coast First Nations people. Like much of Erickson's work, the building is made primarily out of concrete. The building takes advantage of second world war gun emplacements, with the Bill Reid Raven sculpture located on a repurposed gun battery.

In 2006, the museum launched a project to create a new research wing, as well as new offices, laboratories, a 'culturally sensitive research room', recording studio, and a 5,800-square-foot (540 m^{2}) exhibition hall, the Audain Gallery. Other enhancements included MOA's new Multiversity Galleries, the creation of the RRN (Reciprocal Research Network) linking Northwest Coast collections around the world, a relocated and expanded Museum Shop, year-round cafe, and courtyard and outdoor 'events pad' suitable for facility rentals. The project was completed in January 2010. Budgeted at $55.5 million, the Renewal Project received $34.4 million in funding from the Canada Foundation for Innovation and British Columbia Knowledge Development Fund ($17.2 million each), the University of British Columbia, UBC Faculty of Arts, and the museum itself. In 2009, MOA received a major gift of $5.5 million from the Koerner Foundation, Toronto, towards the project.

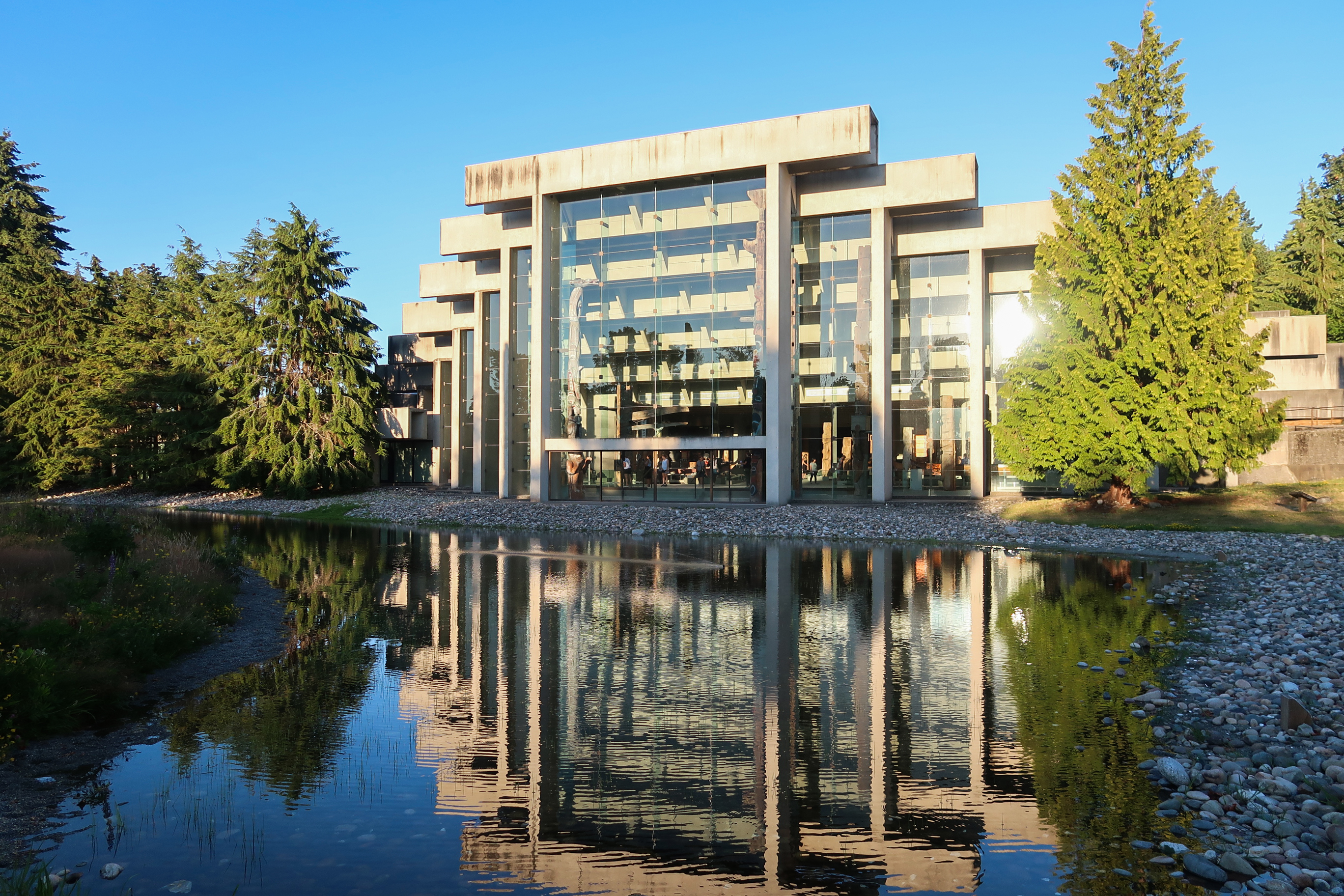
In 2010, a reflecting pool was permanently added to the front entrance of the museum

In September 2010, a reflecting pool was added to the front, funded by Yosef Wosk, OBC. Arthur Erickson and landscape architect Cornelia Oberlander originally intended the pool to be opened as part of the new Museum of Anthropology in 1976; now, nearly 35 years later, their original vision for MOA has been fulfilled. Pools had been installed temporarily three times in MOA's history: for a movie shoot in 1993, for the APEC leaders’ summit in 1997, and to celebrate Arthur Erickson's 80th birthday in June 2004.

In November 2020, the museum began a seismic upgrade project to rebuild its Great Hall in order to upgrade its resiliency and protect its collection in the event of a major earthquake. The Museum reopened on June 13, 2024.

== Galleries ==
The O'Brian and Audain galleries are used for temporary exhibitions.

=== Elspeth McConnell Gallery of Northwest Coast Masterworks ===
The Elspeth McConnell Gallery of Northwest Coast Masterworks was unveiled on June 22, 2017. Designed by Stantec Architecture, the new gallery was converted from the former Michael M. Ames Theatre, and was funded by Montreal-based collector Elspeth McConnell, a $3-million donation from the Doggone Foundation, and a $500,000 grant from the federal government as part of the Canada 150 Community Infrastructure Program. The 210-square-metre gallery features exterior sensors that synchronize both the colour temperature and intensity of the interior light with the changing light conditions outside.

In a Different Light: Reflecting on Northwest Coast Art was the first exhibition held at the gallery.

=== Koerner European Ceramics Gallery ===
The Koerner European Ceramics Gallery opened in 1990 and contains over 600 European ceramics collected by Koerner, which he donated to the museum in 1987. It was curated by Carol E. Mayer, who is a curator and Research Fellow in Ceramics at the MOA.

=== Multiversity Galleries ===
The Multiversity Galleries houses more than 9,000 objects from around the world. Multiversity Galleries showcases items from the museum's collection that would normally be stored.

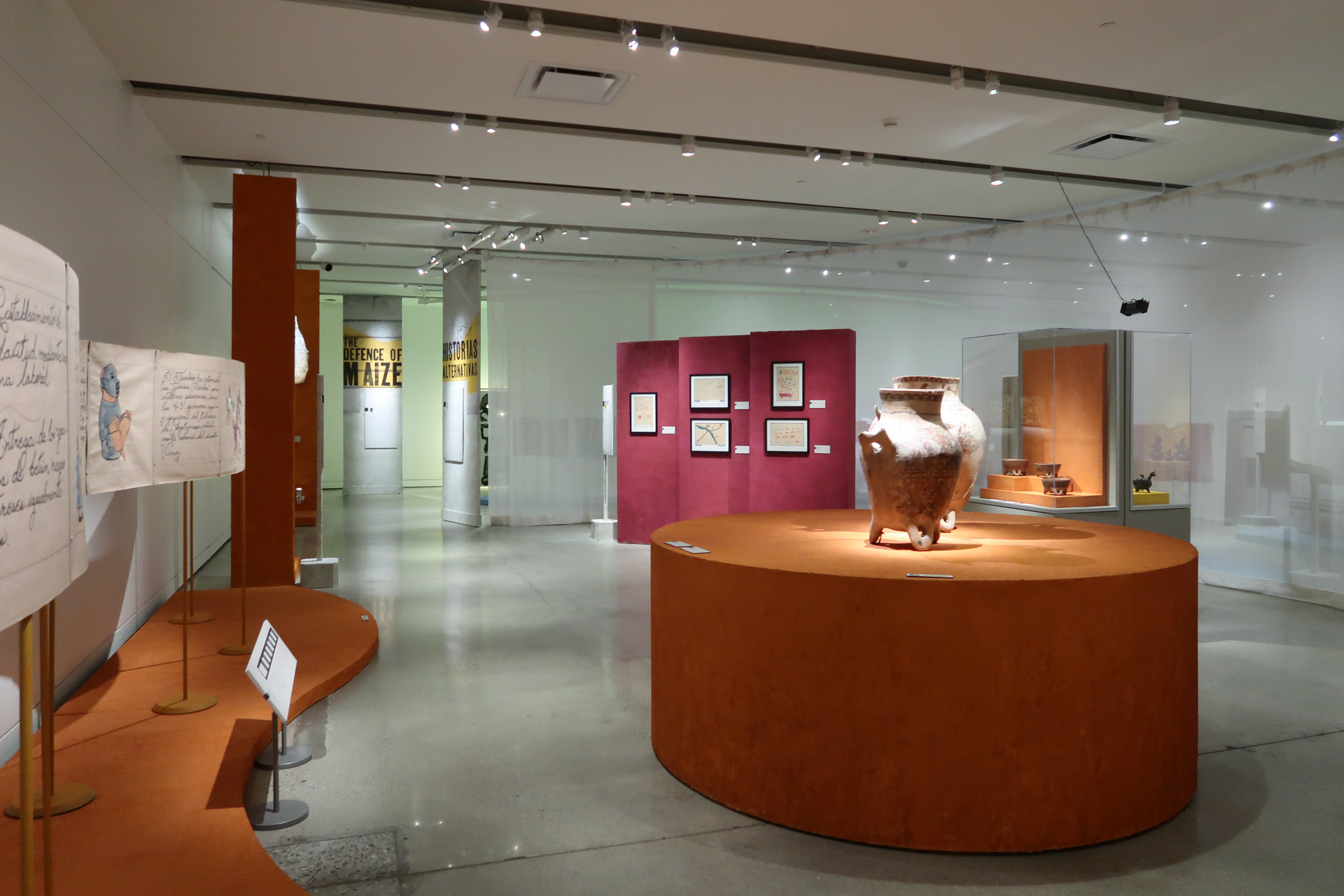
Audain Gallery

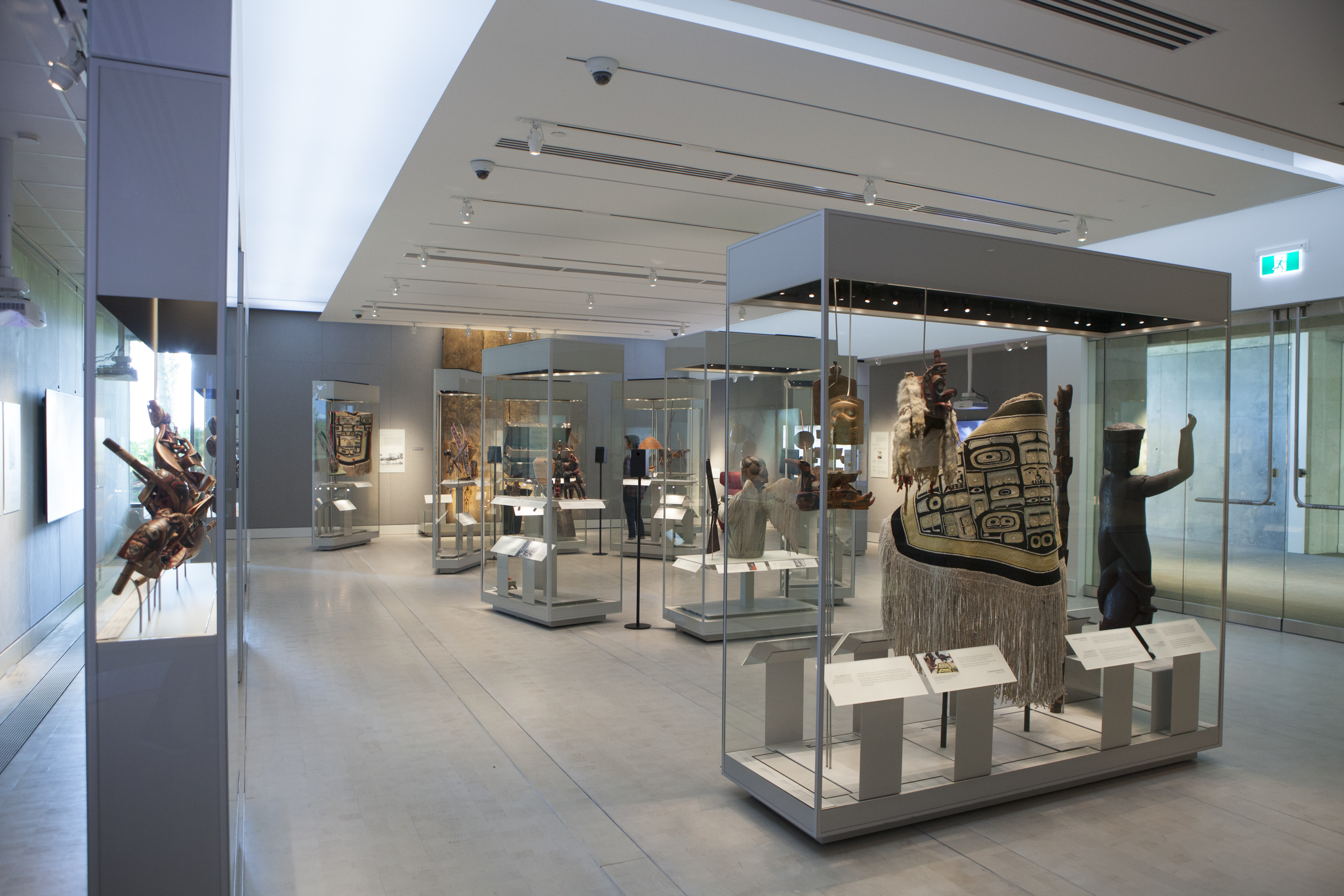
The inaugural exhibition at the Elspeth McConnell Gallery of Northwest Coast Masterworks, 2017

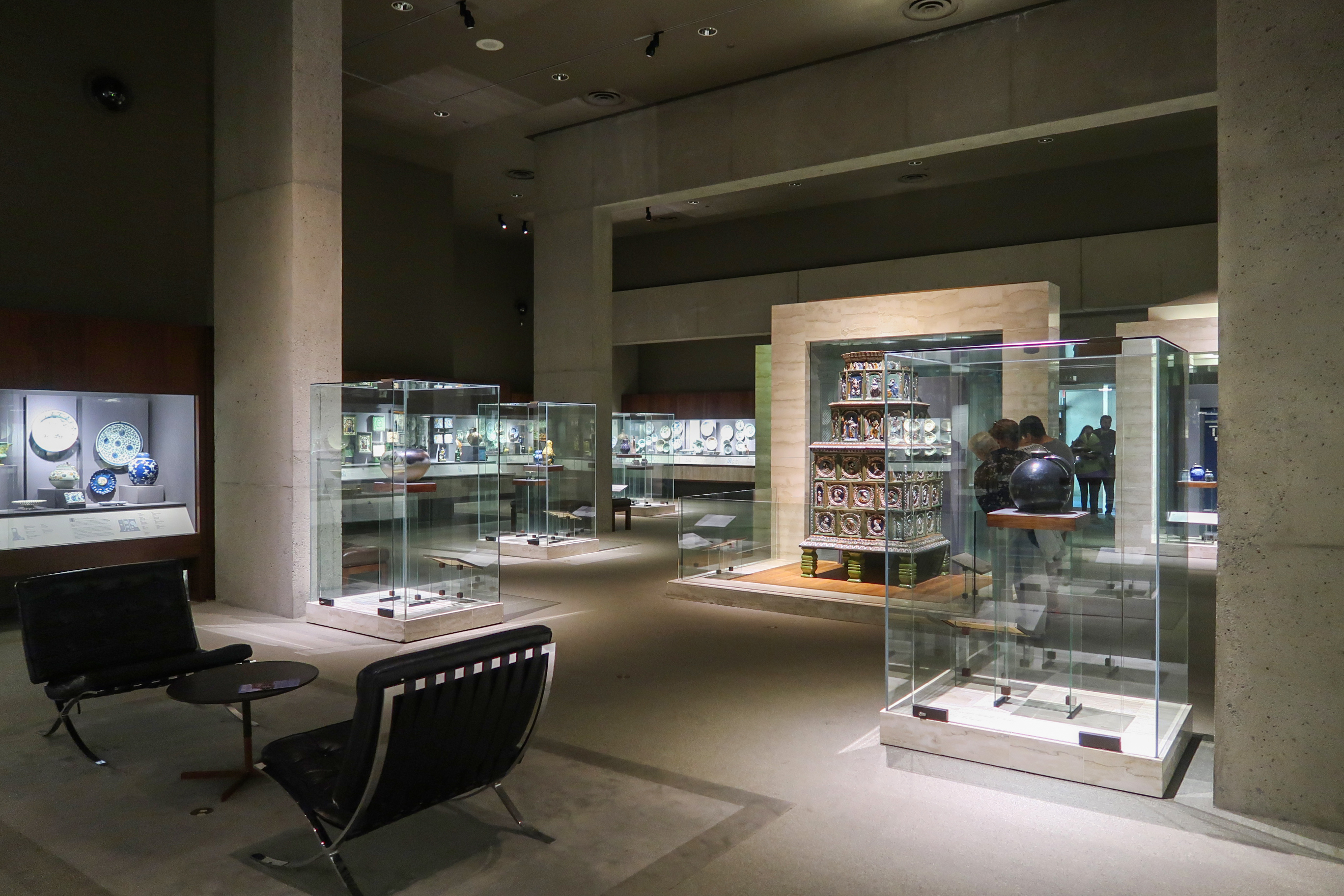
Koerner European Ceramics Gallery

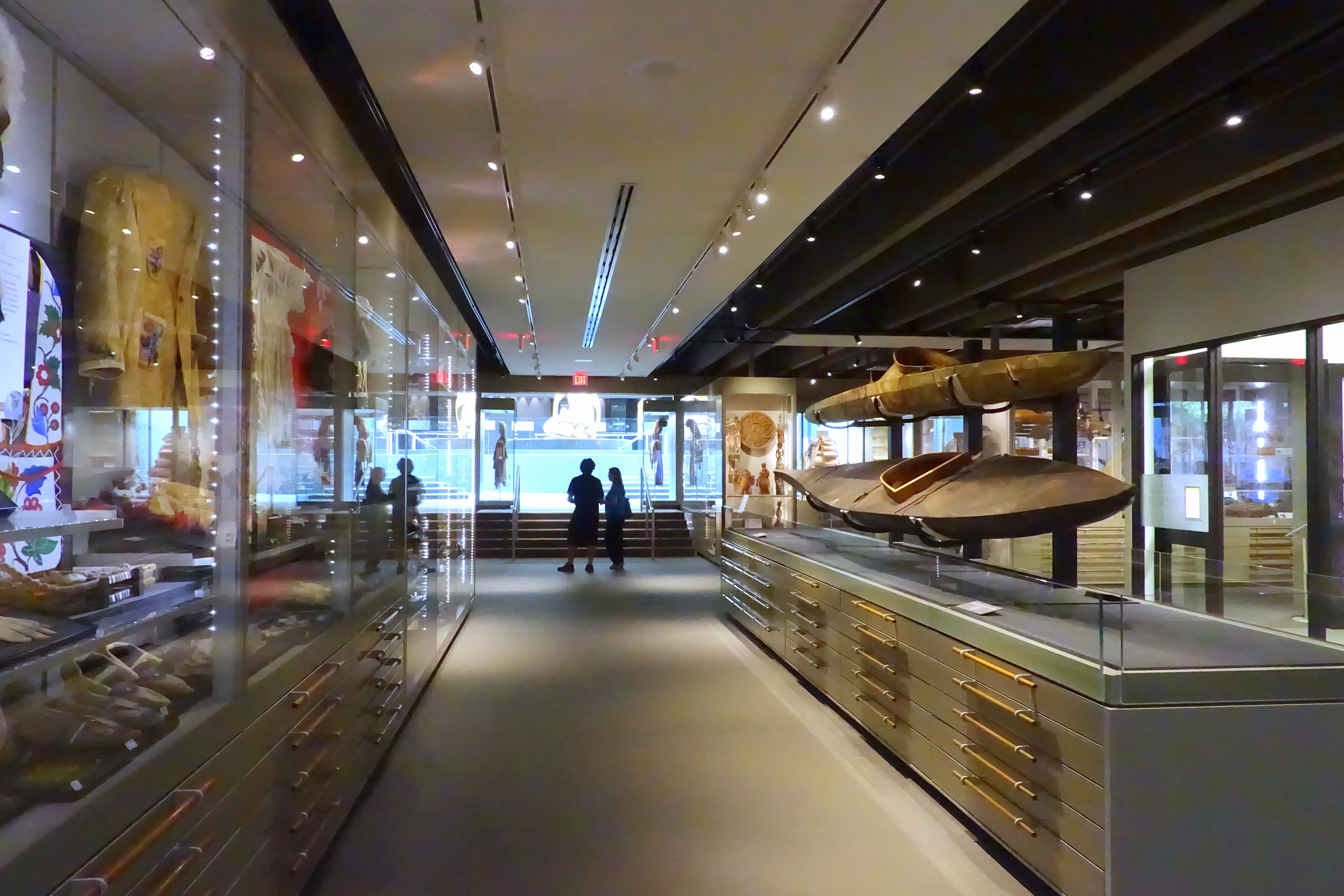
Multiversity Galleries

== Collection ==
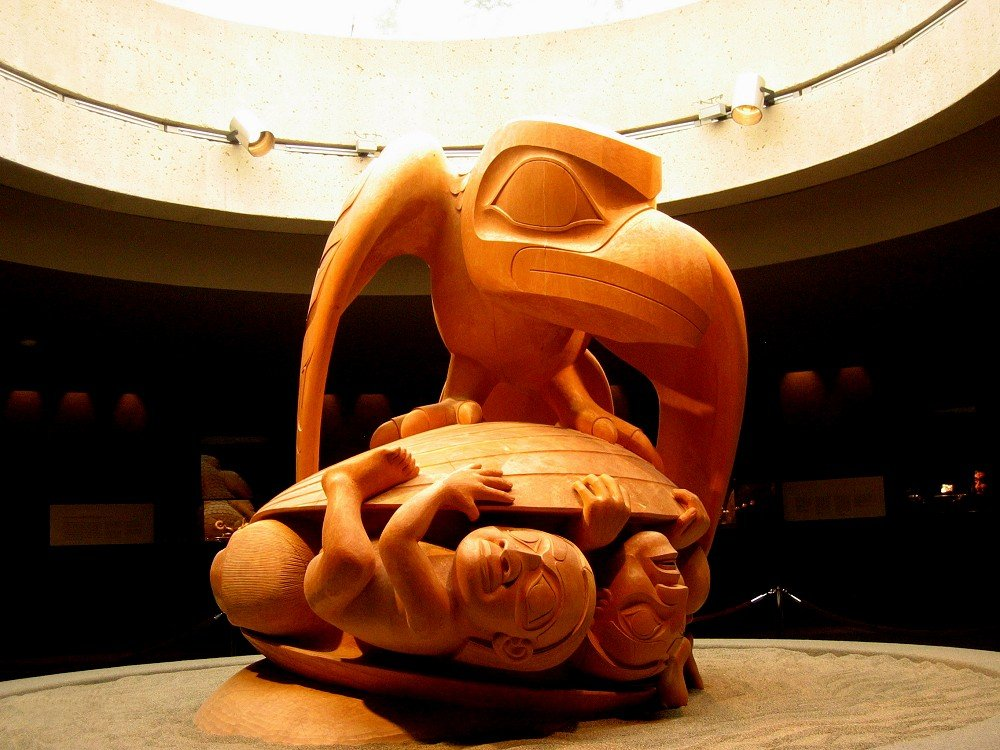
Raven and the First Men by Bill Reid

The Museum of Anthropology includes a number of large sculptures, totem poles, and cultural artifacts. Although MOA's focus is on the First Nations of the Northwest Coast, the collection of close to 50,000 ethnological objects includes objects from all continents. The collections include contemporary works as well as historical objects. In addition to the ethnographic collections, MOA houses an archaeological collection of approximately 535,000 pieces. These are managed by UBC's Laboratory of Archaeology. The museum also has a small wing dedicated to European ceramic art works collected by the late Walter Koerner.

The yellow cedar sculpture The Raven and the First Men by Bill Reid was depicted on the Canadian twenty-dollar bill from 2004 to 2012 (the Canadian Journey Series). Other notable Bill Reid works include his Bear and Wasco (Sea Wolf) sculptures, some of his gold jewellery, and a prototype of the Haida dugout canoe he carved for Expo 86.

There are several large Musqueam artifacts in the museum from the late nineteenth and early twentieth centuries, as well as many contemporary works commissioned from Musqueam artists such as Susan Point, Joe Becker, and Robyn and Debra Sparrow. There are many fragments of totem poles from Haida and other First Nations villages along British Columbia's coast in the museum's Great Hall.

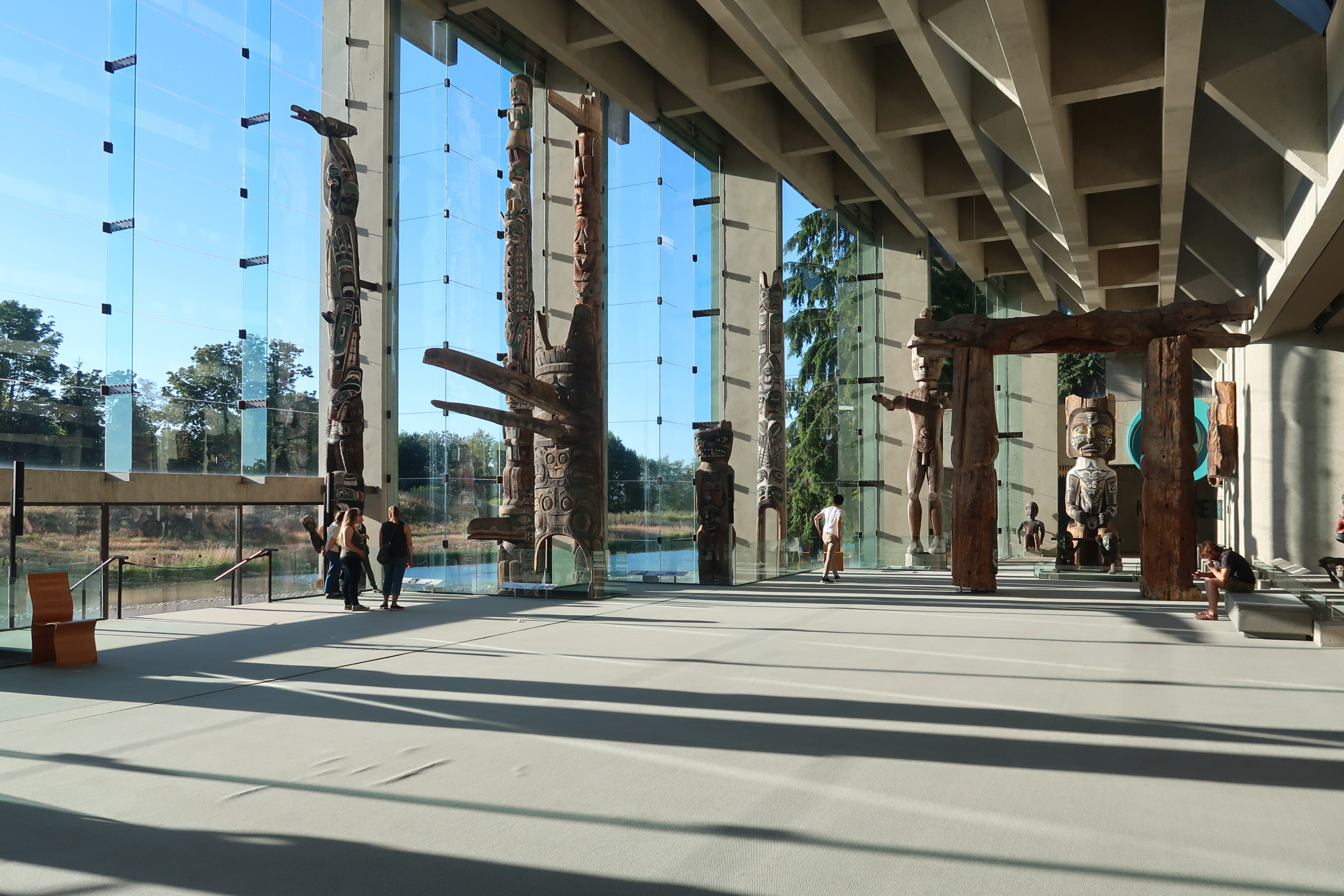
Fragments of totem poles from various First Nations villages in British Columbia were previously situated in the museum's Great Hall

There is an extensive collection from the South Pacific in the MOA.

There are about 6000 textiles in the collection; about half of these come from Asia. Of particular note are the Cantonese opera costumes that are considered some of the world's finest. There are holdings from the Northwest Coast, Oceania, Africa, and South America.

The Audrey & Harry Hawthorn Library and Archives is open to the public. The archives contain approximately 90,000 photographs that cover a wide range of cultures, ethnographic subjects, and historical events. The collection dates from the 1890s.

There are approximately 2800 belongings in the African collection. The earlier collections came to MOA via missionaries, travelers, and ex-colonial officers. The collection includes masks, Yoruba thorn carvings, over 100 Makonde figures from Tanzania, approximately 100 Asante gold weights, weaponry from South Africa and about 100 mortuary objects from Egypt.

About 40% of MOA's collection is from Asia. The Chinese collections include between 1000 and 1500 pieces of Chinese ceramics, Chinese calligraphy, and paintings (with four recently identified masterpieces from the collection of Ho Ping-ti). In addition, there is a large collection of Japanese prints, Buddhist art, Hindu art (including Gandhara sculpture), textiles and clothing, and Indian calendar prints. Other collections include 2300 Chinese coins and amulets, 200 Sichuan blue thread embroideries dating to circa 1900, rare Tibetan robes, and masks from Noe (Japan), Sunni and Kolam (Sri Lanka), and Pongsan and Yangju (Korea).

The Haida houses outside the museum were built under the direction of Bill Reid, who carved, with Doug Cranmer, many of the totem poles surrounding them. The original Reid/Cranmer totem pole mounted on the front of the big house was taken inside in 2000 due to deterioration and replaced with the new "Respect to Bill Reid Pole" by Haida artist Jim Hart.

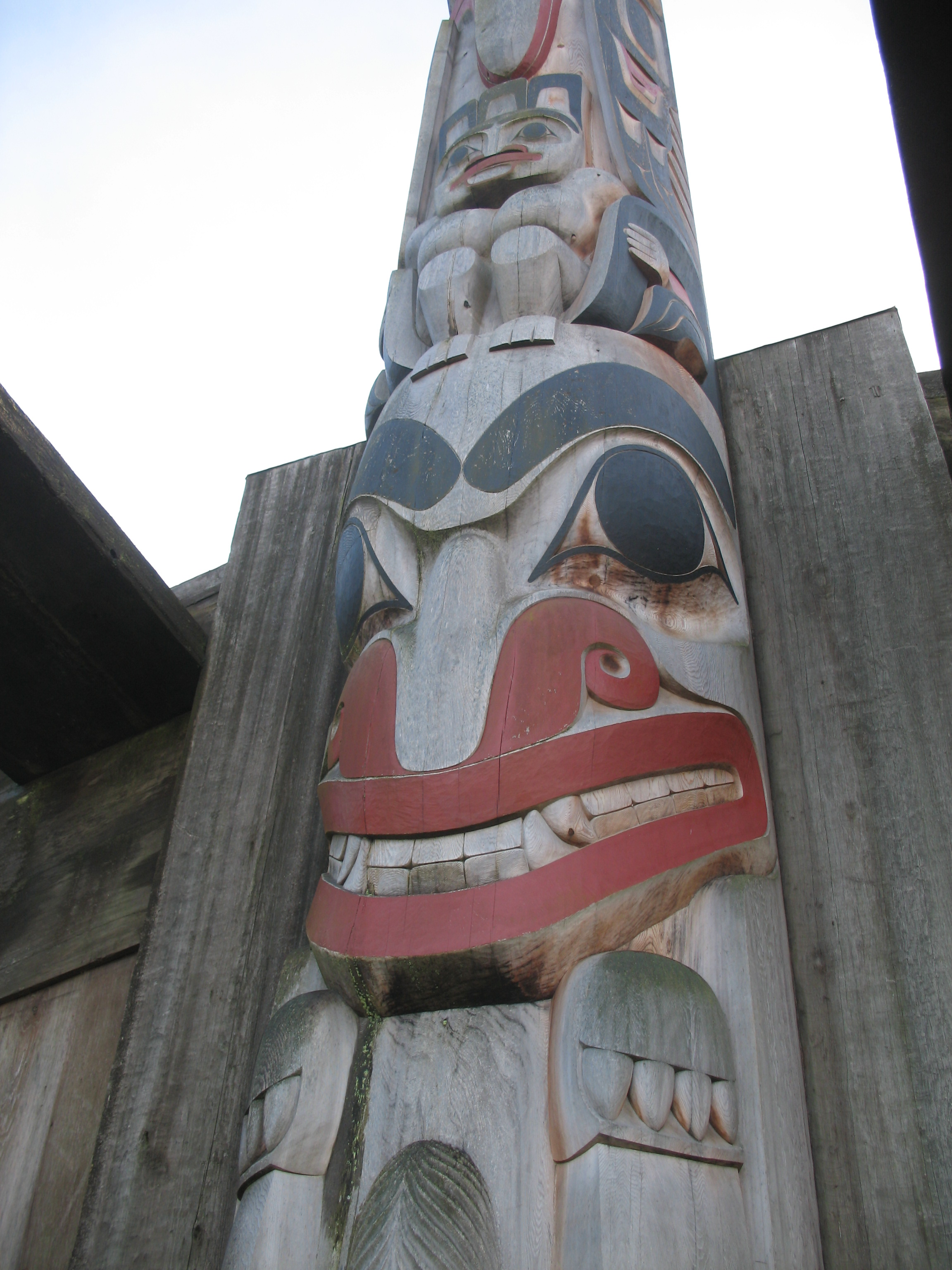
"Respect to Bill Reid pole," carved by Jim Hart at the Museum of Anthropology at UBC

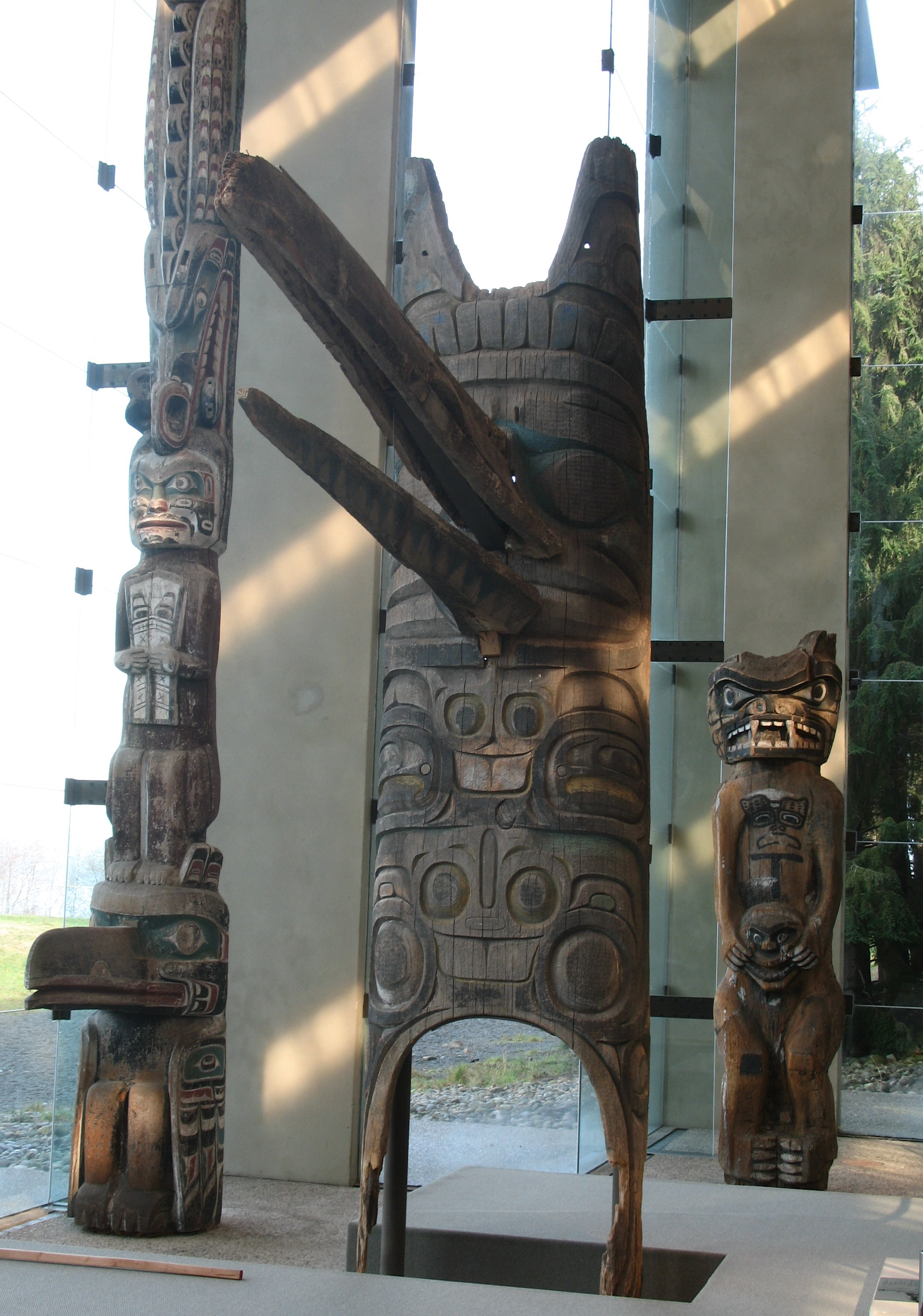
Wuikinuxv house-front pole in the Great Hall

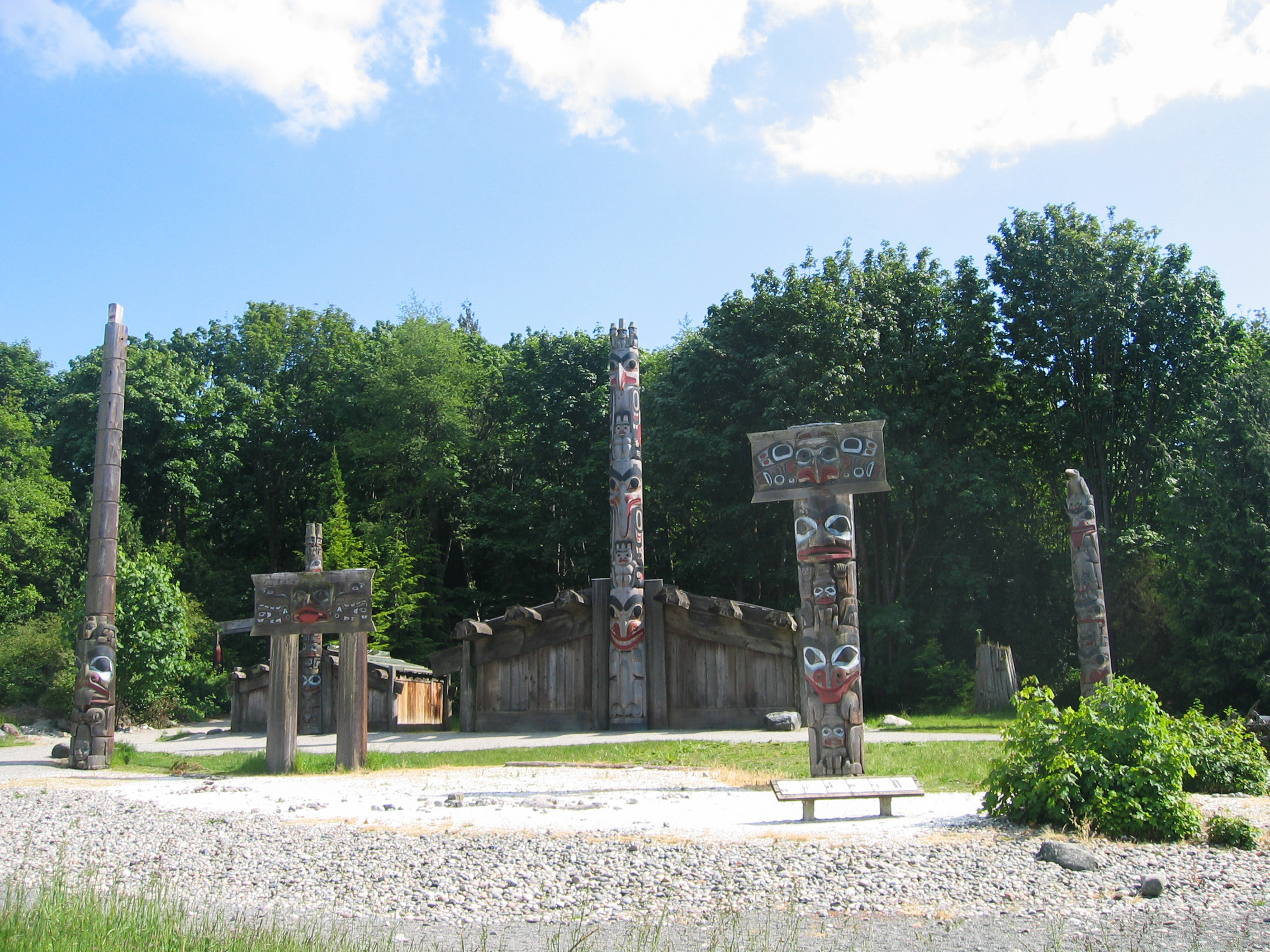
First Nations totem poles and Haida houses

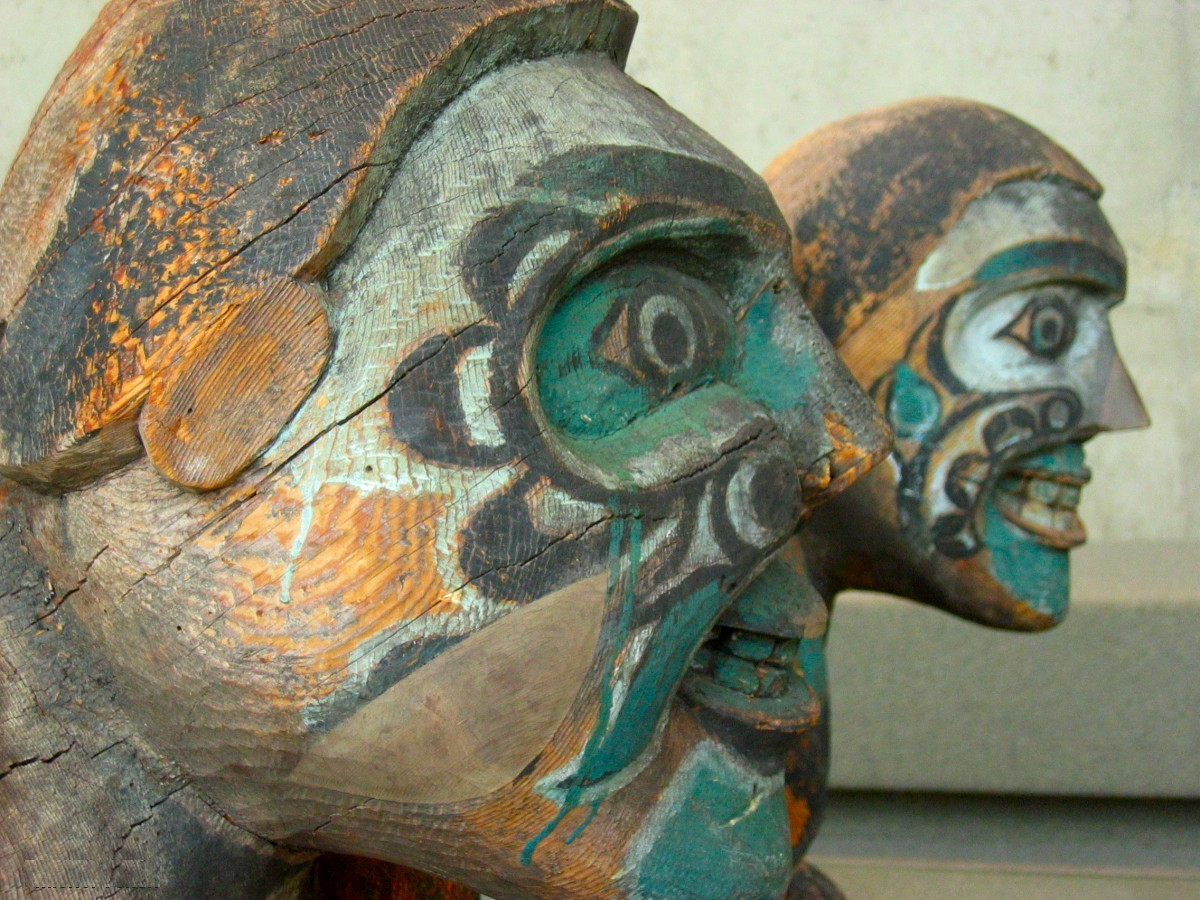
Detail of George Nelson's cedar house post

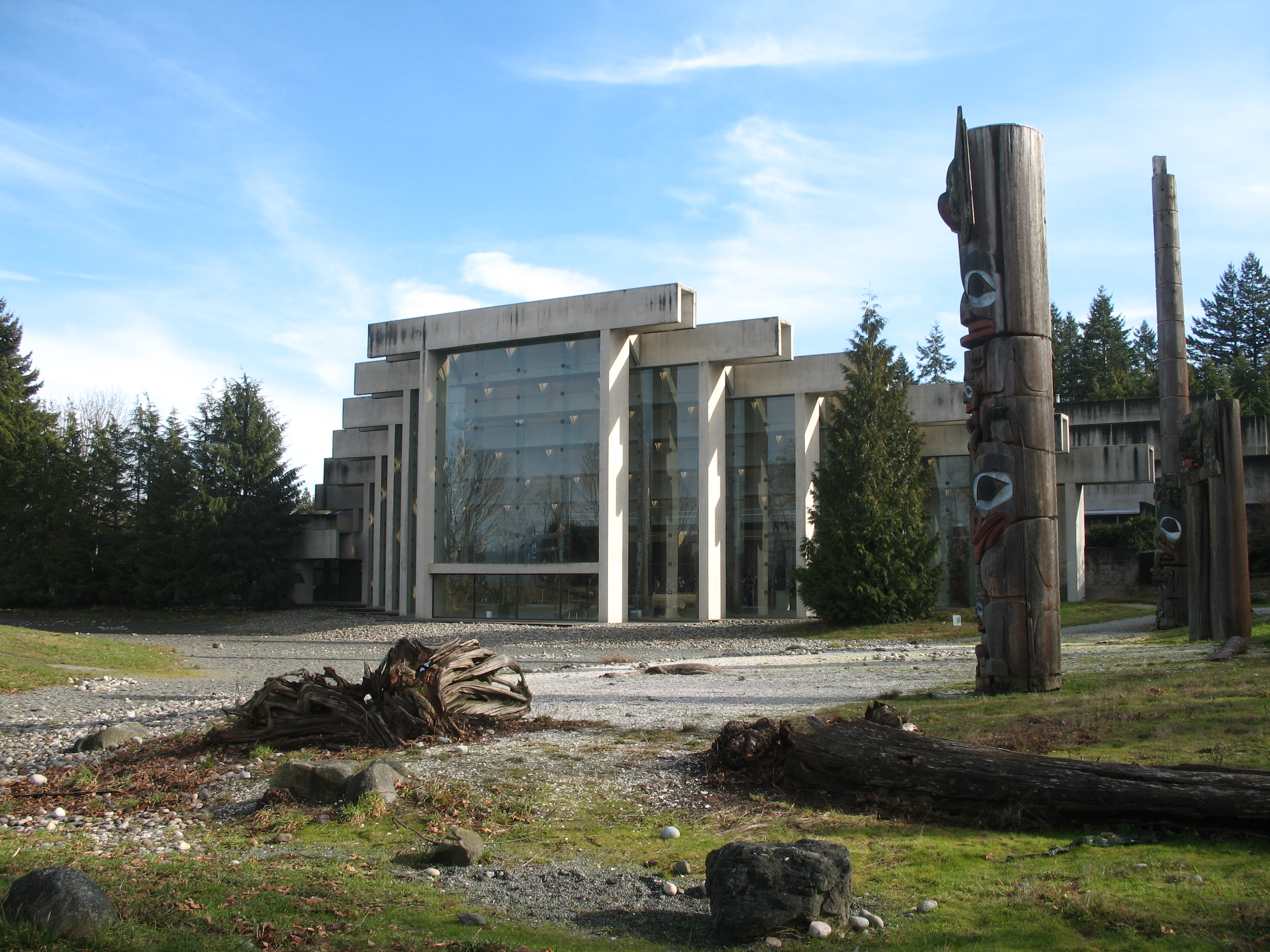
Back view of MOA and outdoor exhibits

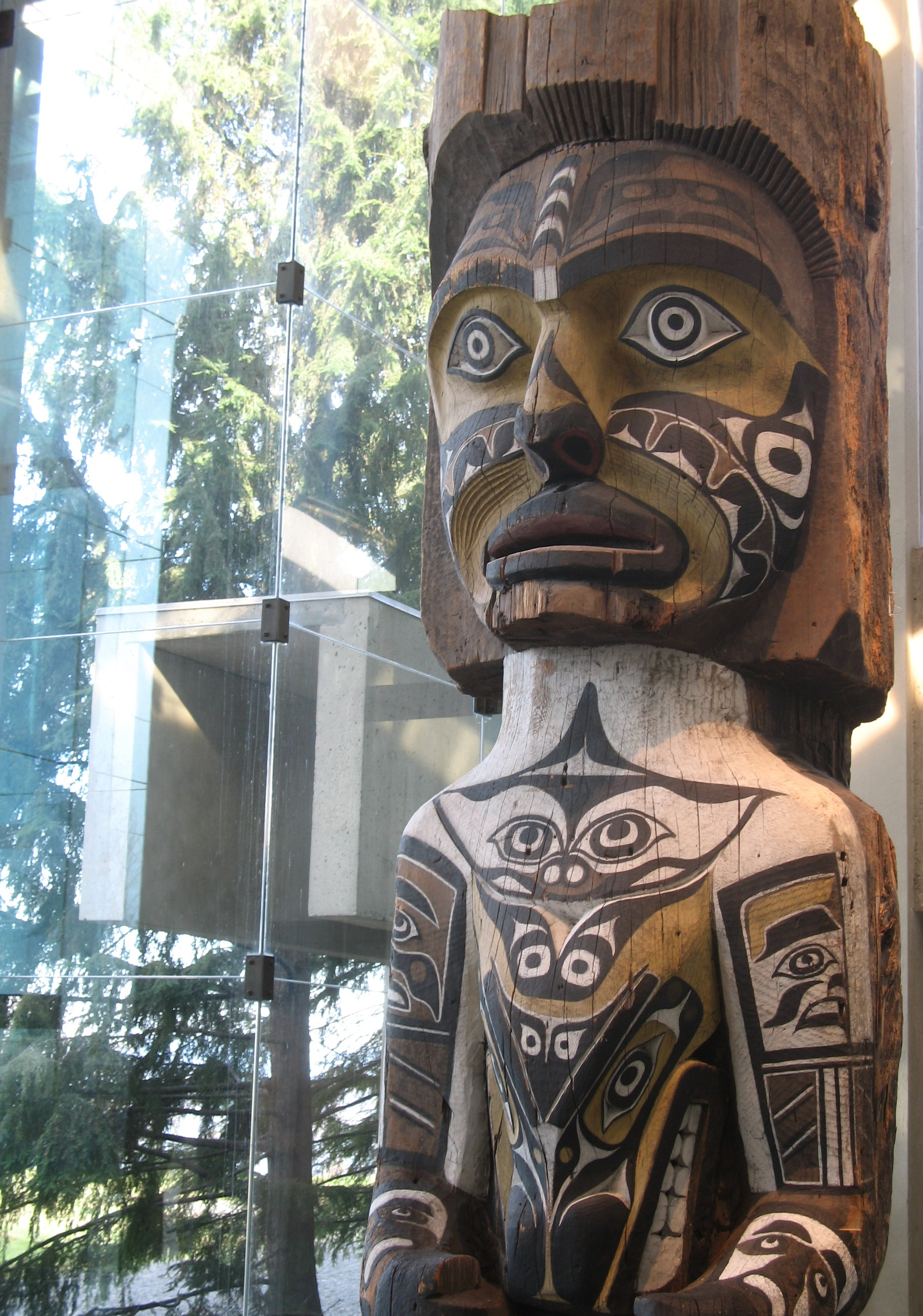
George Nelson's cedar house post in the Great Hall

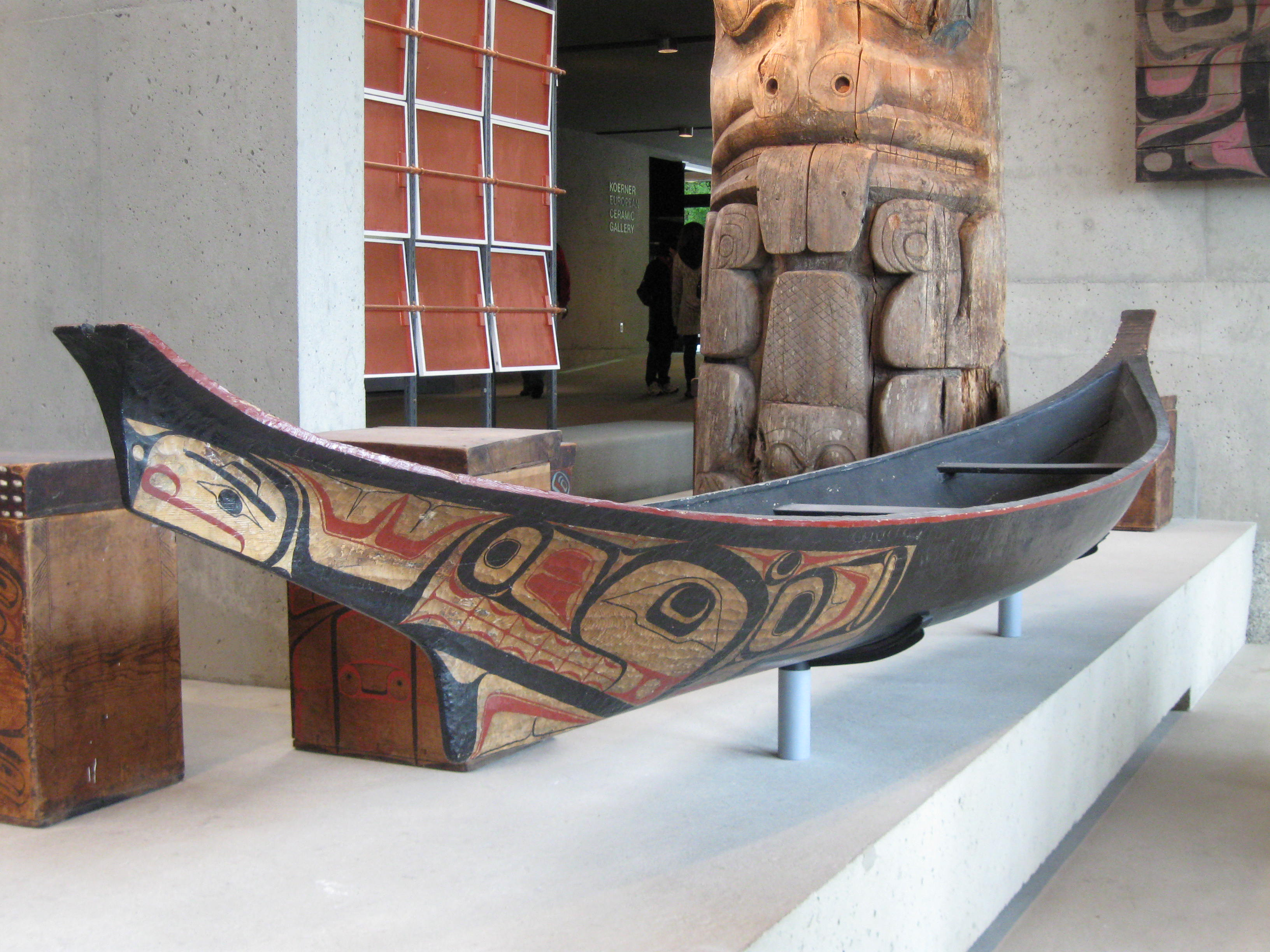
Haisla canoe

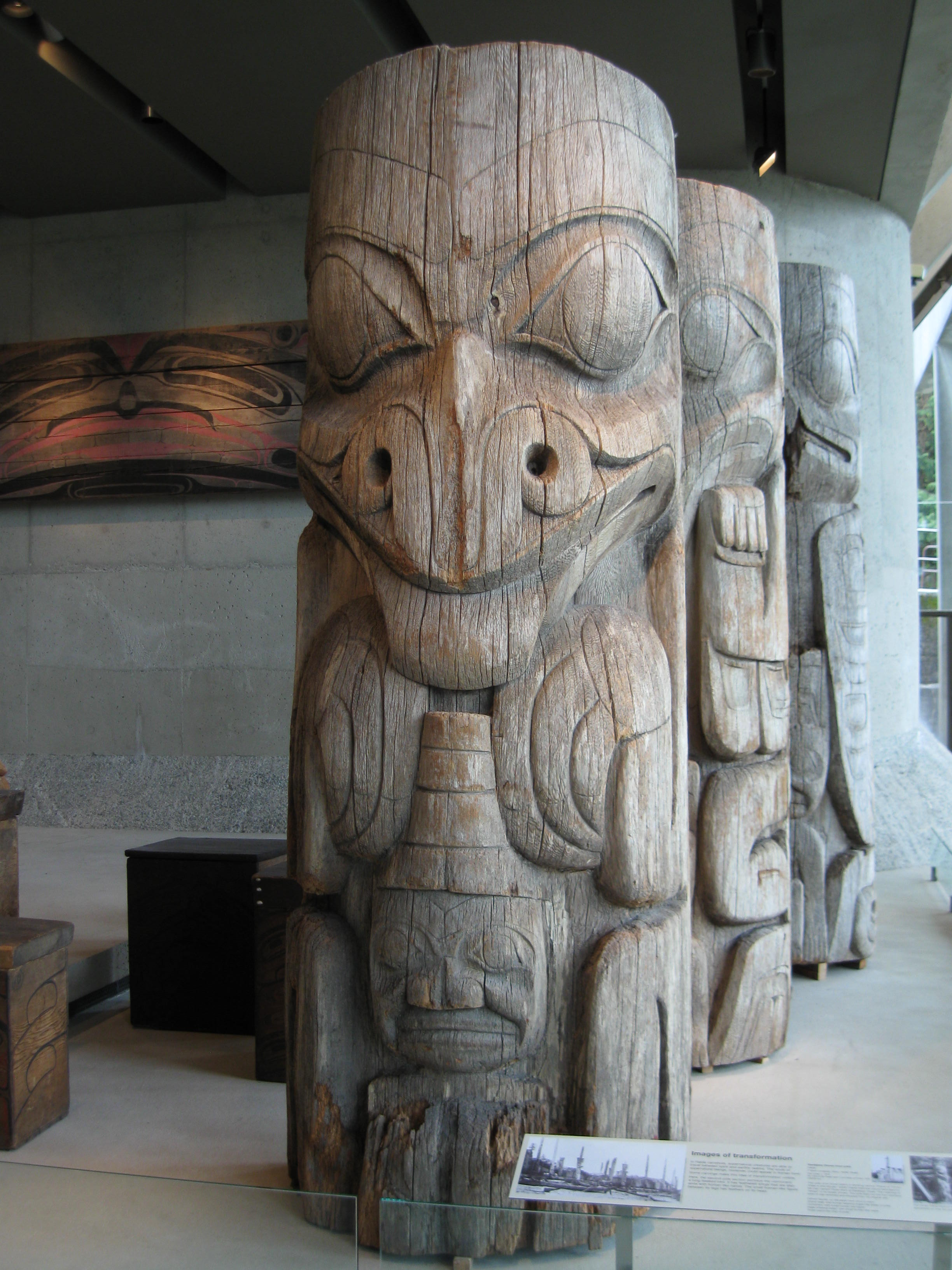
Haida house frontal totem pole

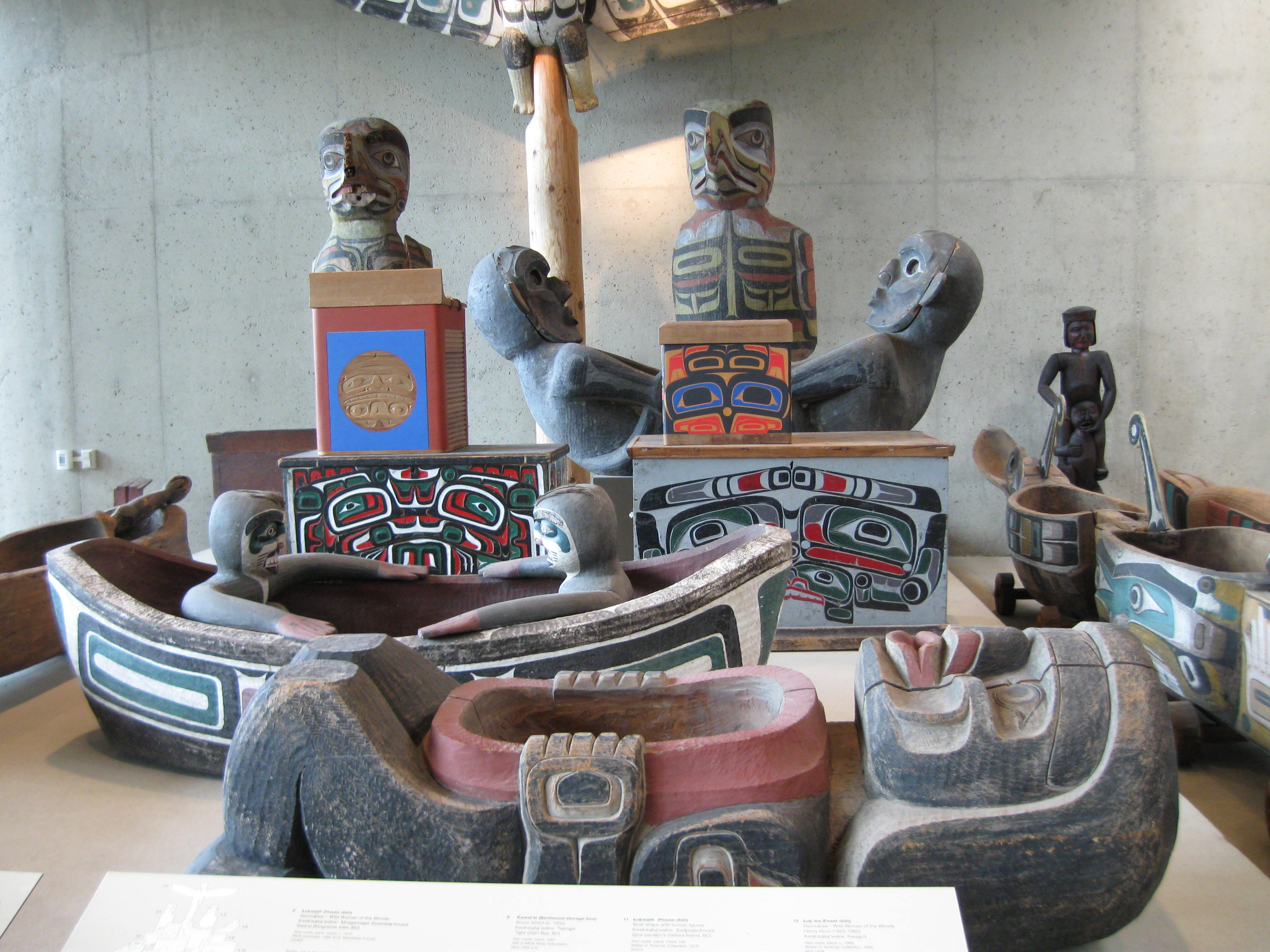
Northwest Coast feast dishes

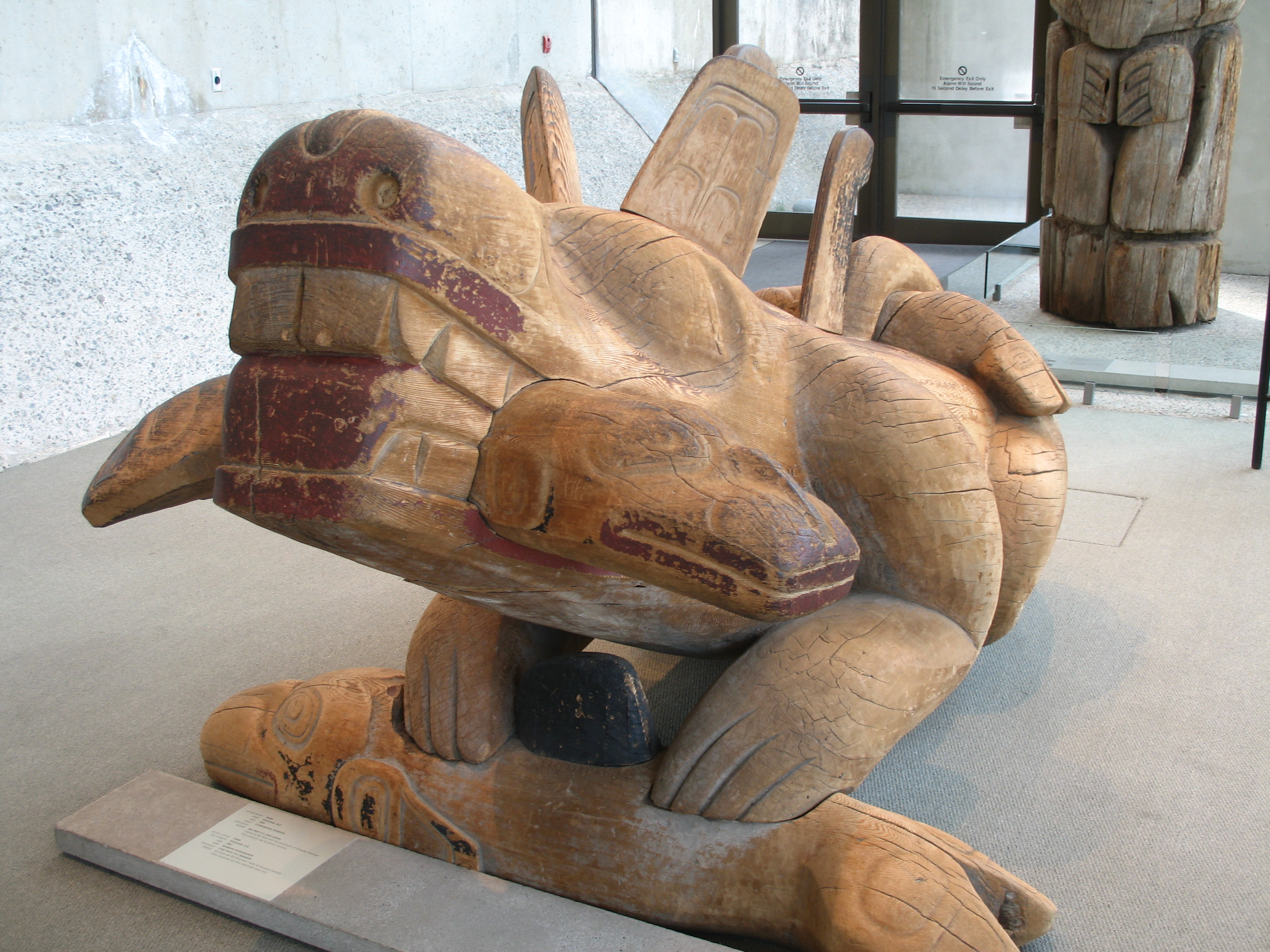
"Sea Wolf" carved by Bill Reid

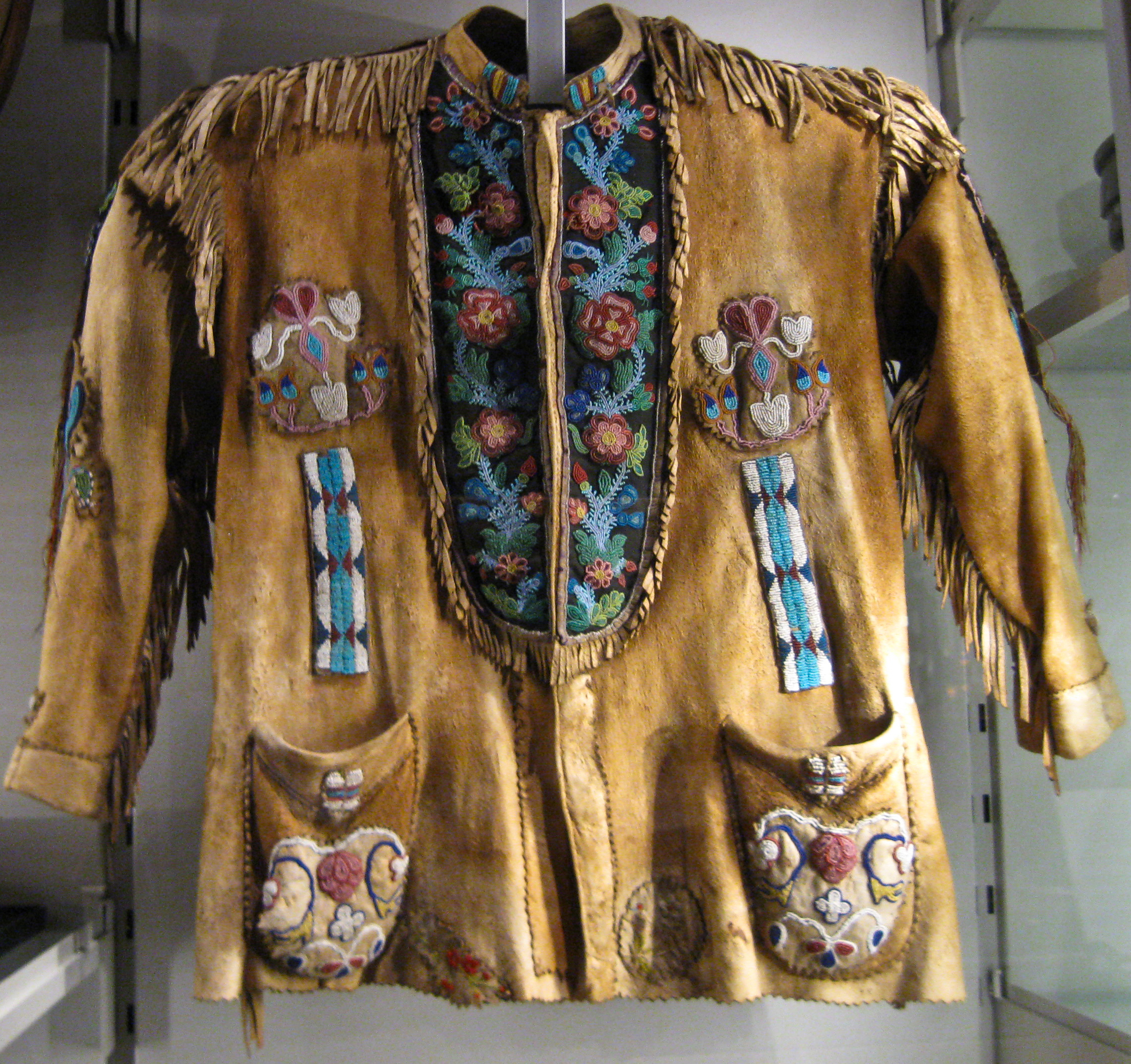
Arctic American shirt

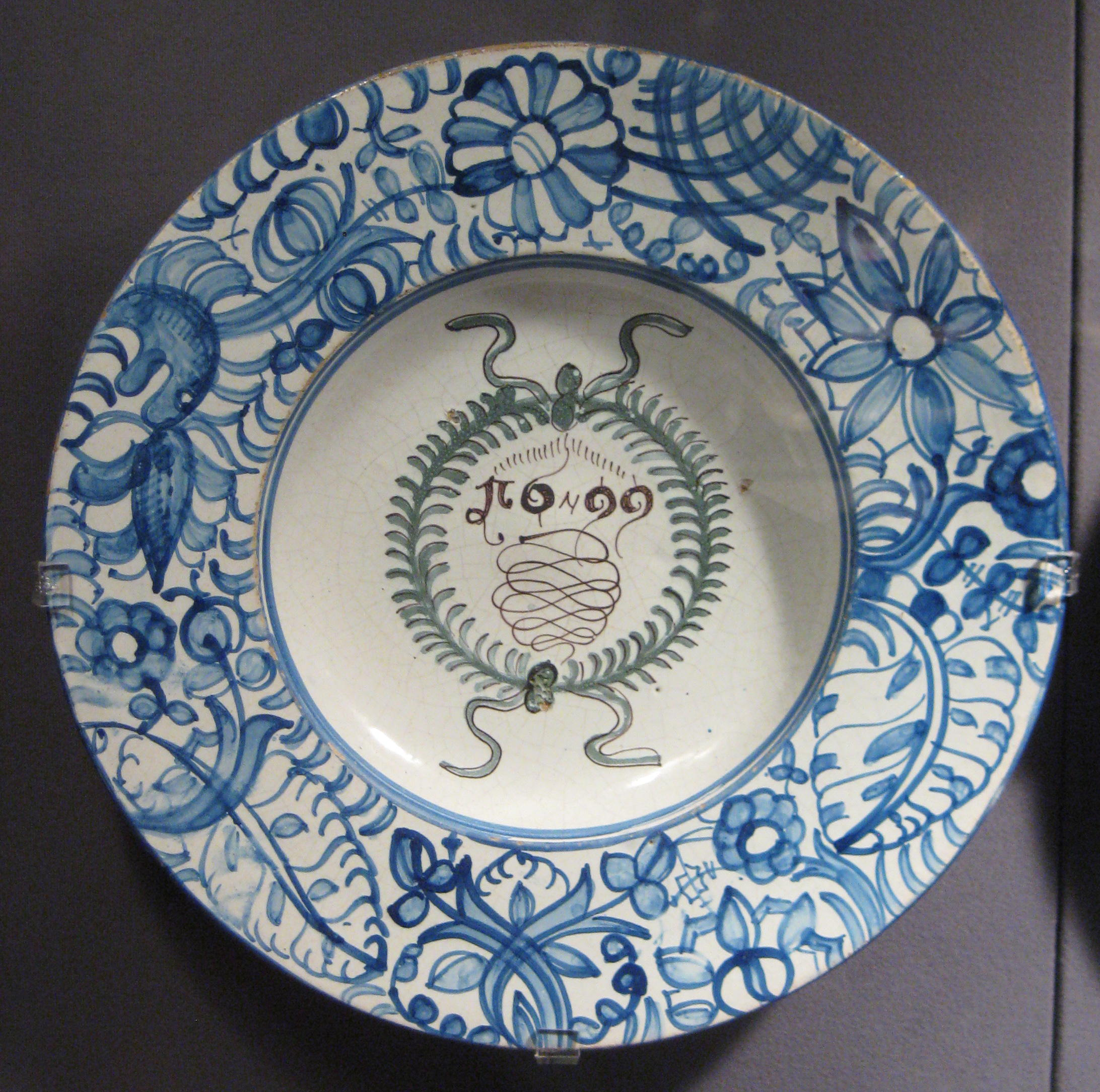
Odler dish ware (Koerner European Ceramic Gallery)

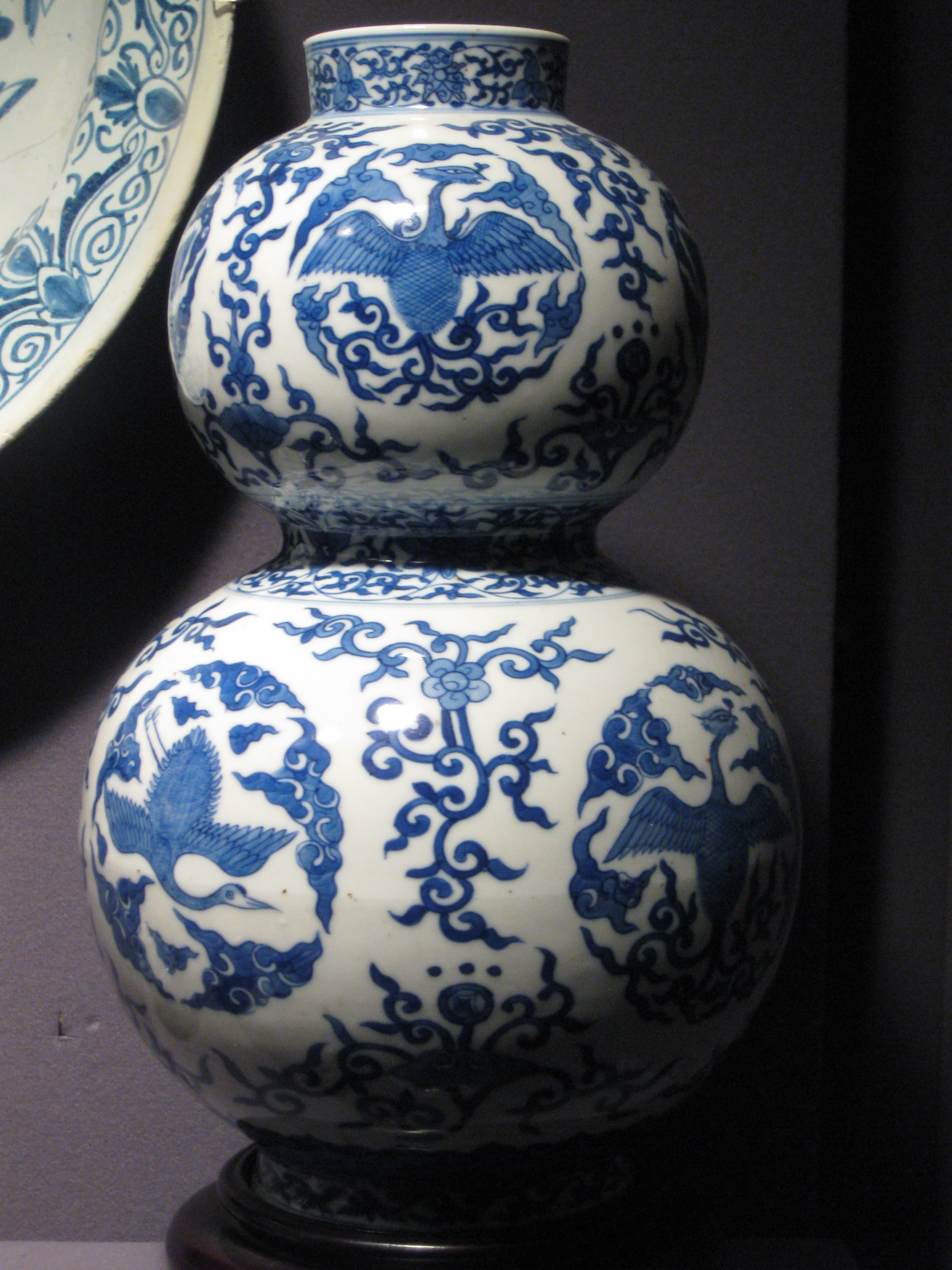
Kendi pot (Koerner European Ceramic Gallery)

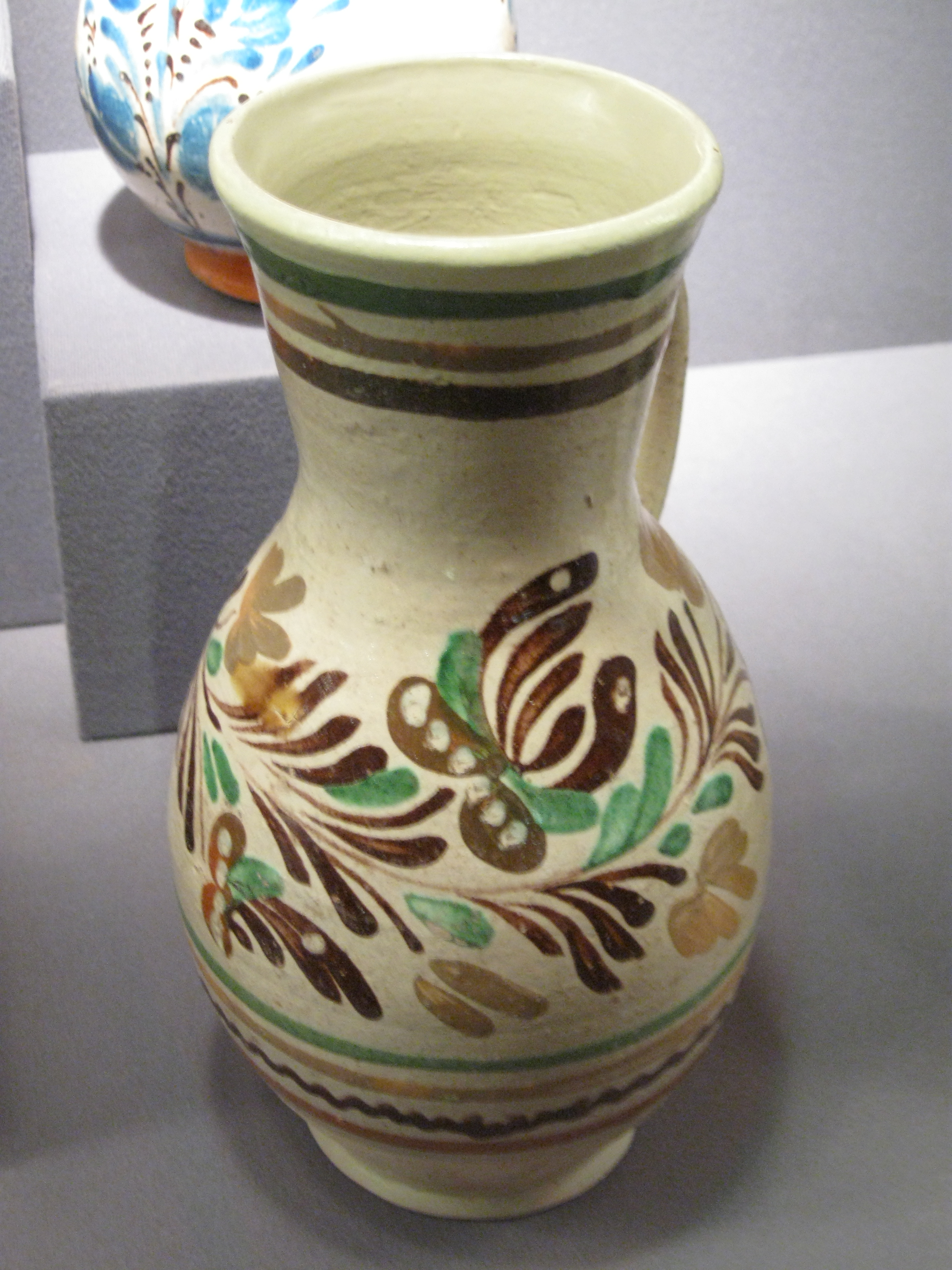
Slovak jug (Koerner European Ceramic Gallery)

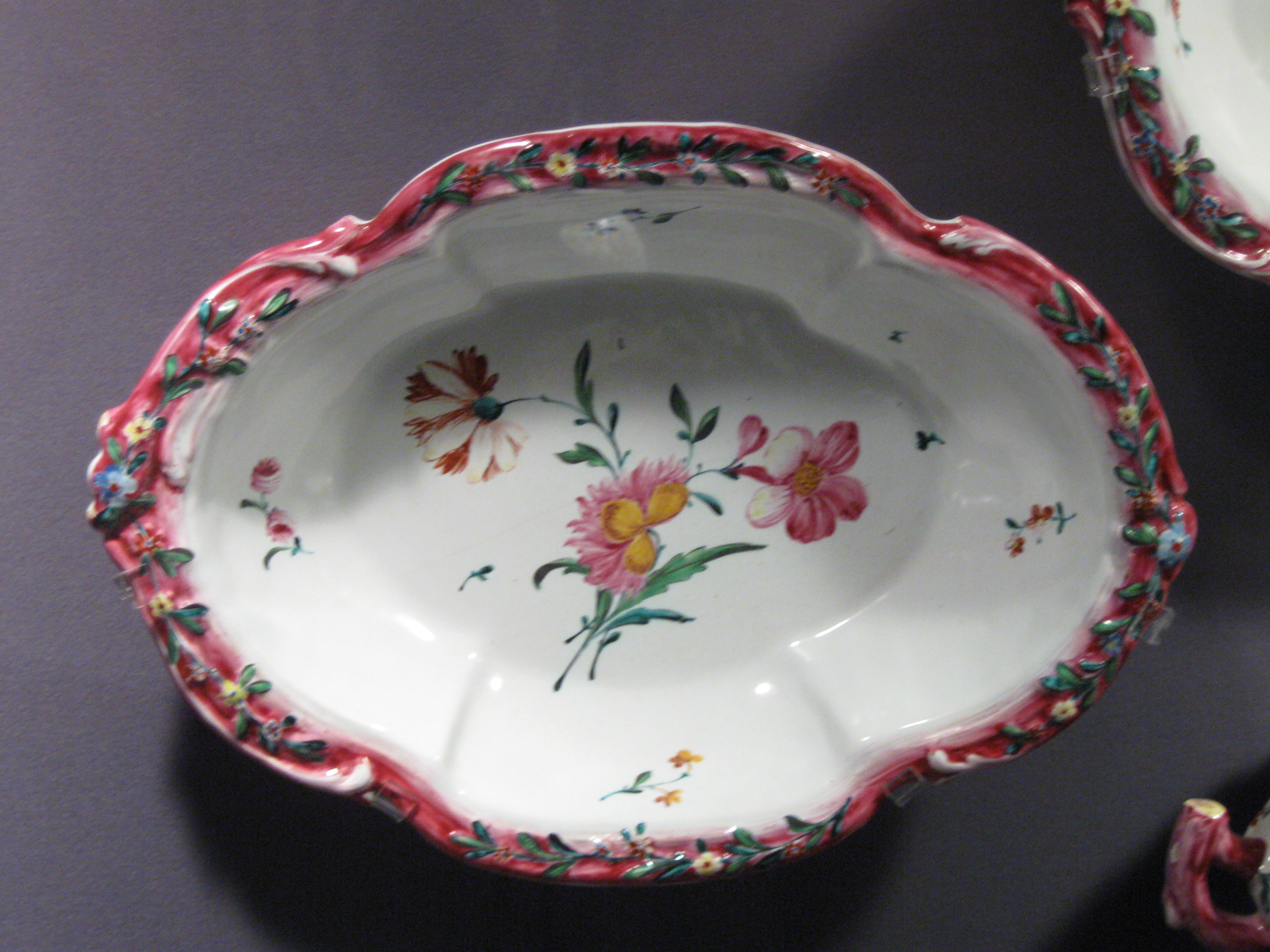
Holitsch dish (Koerner European Ceramic Gallery)

== Programs ==
The Museum of Anthropology works with the Irving K. Barber Learning Centre and others to support the Indigitization program, which provides funding and training for Indigenous communities and organizations to digitize cultural heritage materials. Each summer, MOA hosts the Native Youth Program (NYP), the longest running training program for Indigenous high school students in British Columbia. It provides summer employment and training to six urban Indigenous high school students and two UBC students as program manager and research assistant. NYP is co-organized by MOA and the First Nation House of Learning at UBC.

== Affiliations ==
The museum is affiliated with Canadian Heritage Information Network, Canadian Museums Association, and Virtual Museum of Canada.

== In popular culture ==
The Museum of Anthropology was used as a filming location for the Netflix TV Series, Altered Carbon in season 1.

It is also used as a location in the movie Intersection, starring Richard Gere.
