= Sonya Kelliher-Combs =

Native American artist (born 1969)

- Born: 1969 (age 56–57); Bethel, Alaska, U.S.
- Education: University of Alaska Fairbanks; Arizona State University
- Notable work: Common Threads; Red Curls; Gold Idiot Strings
- Spouse: Shaun Combs
- Website: www.sonyakellihercombs.com

Sonya Kelliher-Combs is a Native American artist who works primarily with organic structures such as walrus gut, which was used for centuries by Native Americans in making Inupiaq "overcoats". Her work has been described as "[moving] beyond oppositions between Western/Native culture, self/other, and man/nature, in order to examine their interrelationships and interdependence while also questioning accepted notions of beauty."

== Early and personal life ==
Kelliher-Combs was born during 1969 in Bethel, Alaska and brought up in Nome, Alaska. During her childhood she learned to make traditional everyday pieces like beadwork and sewing with skins from her mother. These pieces connected Kelliher-Combs with her past, as sewing skins allowed past Native Americans to resist the extreme cold, while beading allowed to add to their cultural aesthetic. She also spent time with artists in her area and studied their work. She has cited this as an influence as this exposed her to new art forms at a young age, specifically sculpture made from multiple materials. Kelliher-Combs has stated that she received many compliments and appreciation for her drawings from others as a kid, with others describing herself as having always been a doodler, but she did not initially take art seriously. She believed that she would be a lawyer or engineer, expecting that she would take the same journey that her grandfather took, who became a federal marshal and after that a judge in Nome.

She married her high school sweetheart Shaun Combs after graduating from the University of Alaska Fairbanks.

Kelliher-Combs currently resides and operates in Anchorage, Alaska, where she is a member of the Alaska Native Arts Foundation Board, Alaska State Council in Arts Visual Arts Advisory, and the Institute of American Indian and Alaska Native Arts Board.

== Education ==
Kelliher-Combs took art classes as a young girl and later attended the University of Alaska Fairbanks, where she discovered that she was meant to be an artist and that this was what her heart desired. She studied under David Mollett, an artist and instructor she described as honest, upfront, merciless. At one point he explained that living as an artist is tough and demanding, and that based on the odds, just one person from the whole class would still be creating art as a career in twenty years. This speech helped her understand the significance of becoming an artist in order to carry on her Native American tradition and Kelliher-Combs states that this was the day she finally decided to put all of her effort into becoming an artist. She graduated with a Bachelor of Fine Arts degree in 1992, after which she went to Europe in order to discover new things that may help improve her art and understand and observe different cultures and how they represent themselves. Artists who she considered an influence to her work at that time and since then include Maya Lin, Ellen Gallagher, Jane Hammond, Anne Wilson, and an artist who used biomorphic forms, Eva Hesse.

Kelliher-Combs went on to earn a Master of Fine Arts from Arizona State University. She has described this as a difficult time in her life as she had to be away from her husband, who had to stay and work in Nome. She missed both her family and culture greatly, stating that We ran up huge phone bills . . . But I'd come home every summer to become re- energized . . . realized that my family, my culture and Alaska were the sources of my creativity. She further remarked that it was all an important learning experience, where her work and her paintings began to appear more object-like and monochromatic.

== Career ==
Kelliher-Combs began exhibiting while she was still at the University of Alaska Fairbanks in the process of getting her bachelor's degree. During this time she reacted strongly to artists she learned in school such as de Kooning and Picasso, which influenced her to add abstraction into her work. She also became quite interested in the formline approach common in Northwest Coast art, having learned this from her Alaskan Native Studies classes. She appreciated how form-line already abstracted animal shapes for her and believed that it would make her art unique, specifically her animal imagery. She believed it gave her art aesthetic building blocks where she could remove and add with ease while maintaining a Native American cultural flare. However, she received much criticism for using designs from a Native culture that was not her own in the process of incorporating these new techniques into her work. After that, she stumbled upon the work of Jim Schoppert that took her breath away. She ventured out many times to the University of Alaska's Museum to see his works and said, I couldn't get enough of it. Schoppert, more than anybody else, was instrumental in helping me see in a new way. He opened a door in my mind that it was ok to do what I was doing.

A combination of elemental and contemporary features became the main principles of Kelliher-Combs' work compared to when she first started out. According to the Encyclopedia of Native American Artists her attempts to be minimalistic and the colors she uses are typically colors of the body.

== Artworks ==
=== Common Thread ===
Made in 2010, this art was made with reindeer rawhide, sheep rawhide, and nylon thread. It was exhibited at the "Hide: Skin as Material and Metaphor" exhibition and Kelliher-Combs has stated that animal skin has been a big part of her life and that the artwork is meant to simply demonstrate this significance in a physical form as pieces of dry reindeer and sheep rawhide are mounted onto a wall in 3 horizontal rows.

=== Red Curls ===
Red Curls was created in 2016 and uses acrylic polymer, reindeer fur, nylon thread, nylon fabric, and steel t-pin. It was exhibited in "New Work" and is made up of 140 large red acrylic polymer curled strips meant to resemble dried fish. She dipped the strips into polymers to showcase how plastic was used in the past to keep fish fresh, stating that it was much like how it is used today although by using the plastic in a different manner.

=== Gold Idiot Strings ===
Made with wool, sheep, rawhide, wire, nylon thread, and wax, this art was made in 2013 and exhibited at "The Things We Carry". This piece was made by Kelliher-Combs after 3 of her uncles had killed themselves. Per the artist, this piece is meant to illustrate people as a whole and discuss the decline of native cultural traditions in today's society.

=== "Remnant" Series ===
Kelliher-Combs's "Remnant" Series (2016) is a collection of contemporary works created to provoke emotion and spark a search for deeper meaning and first featured in SITE Santa Fe's "Much Wider Than a Line." The series involved a small room with "twenty-nine rectangular constructions" for viewers to absorb. These rectangular constructions had an ancient glass window that displayed a suspended "polymer-coated human hair or animal body" part. Kelliher-Combs achieves these "textural effects" by using her hands, "electric fans, and other tools," as well as the unexpected reactions to the atmosphere. Some of these "encased objects" are feathers, walrus stomach, and animal bones.

=== Unraveled Secrets ===
Created in 2006 and exhibited in Modo Gallery, Hudson, NY, Unraveled Secrets is Kelliher-Combs's expression of the many layers that make up identity. Inspired by Kelliher-Combs's complex racial identity, Unraveled Secrets presents identity as layers of "construct built on honesty and insight, resistance to and respect for tradition" as well as the spiritual change that takes place over time. Unraveled Secrets is a "mixed-media installation" of a single thread that is woven through "thousands of steel quilting needles tacked to the wall."

== See also ==
- Visual arts by indigenous peoples of the Americas
