= Copper shield =

Ceremonial object in Tlingit culture

Copper Shield or Tináa (Also stylized as tin'aa or tináa) is a ceremonial copper shield associated with the Tlingit people and other Pacific Northwest indigenous peoples. Copper shields served as displays of wealth, status, and prestige, and not used for warfare.

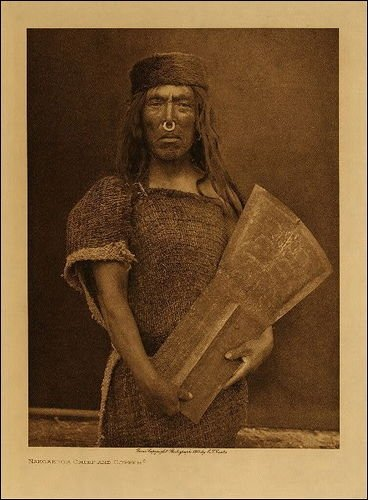
A Kwakwaka'wakw man holding a copper shield

The typical copper shield is divided into three portions roughly resembling a torso, with a wider upper portion, and a longer lower section divided horizontally. Shields were given names, and the upper portion was often painted with clan crests, representing ancestors, akin to a heraldic plaque or crest.

As symbols of wealth, copper shields informally functioned as a form of currency, and were disbursed as gifts at ceremonial dances and potlatches, or exchanged between chiefs. Sometimes copper shields were broken into pieces between being distributed, particularly among the Kwakwaka’wakw, while the Tlingit and Haida in the North did not break their shields. A chief may have more than a dozen shields, and after his death, his coppers were often fastened onto his memorial pole.

Copper was an important material to the Pacific northwest peoples and copperworking was known to have been practiced before European contact. Copper was traded from the Alaska interior, particularly in the headwaters of the Copper River. The production of coppers exploded after European trade brought copper during the fur trade in the late 1700s.

The form of copper shields, and its iconic shape, continues today as a motif in contemporary Northwest indgenous art.

== See also ==
Alaska Native art Native copper Northwest Coast art Tlingit
