= Native Art Center at the University of Alaska Fairbanks =

Art school at the University of Alaska Fairbanks

Coordinates: 64°51′27″N 147°49′16″W

The Native Art Center at the University of Alaska Fairbanks is an art school located at the University of Alaska Fairbanks (UAF), near Fairbanks, Alaska. The Native Art Center was started in 1966 by Ronald Senungetuk (Iñupiaq). Today, the Native Art Center is directed by Da-ka-xeen Mehner (Tlingit-Nisga'a) and offers BFA and MFA degrees in Native Art.

== History ==
The Native Art Center offers studio art courses, workshops with Native Alaskan artists and cultural carriers, and artists-in-residence programs. Visiting artists are from Native Alaskan cultures, such as Yupik (including Alutiiq), Iñupiaq, Athabascan, Tlingit, Haida, Tsimshian, and Aleut artists from throughout Alaska.

First founded in 1965, the Native Art Center brings together artists from rural communities to study indigenous forms of art at the University of Alaska (now known as UAF). Over the past 40 years, the center has evolved to become an academic-based program including courses in studio art and Native art history and special workshops and symposia on topics including mask making, bentwood traditions, basketry, sculpture and carving. Dedicated to the creative spirit and an objective to provide educational opportunities for young Native artists.

== Directors ==
Ronald Senungetuk founded the Native Arts Center in 1965 and served as its director until his retirement in 1986. He was also head of the UAF Art Department from 1977 until retiring. He has been a teacher, mentor, and supporter of talented Alaska Native students who might not have otherwise had the aspiration or opportunity to attend college. During his UAF tenure, he advocated to keep the center active for both established and emerging Native artists who did not necessarily meet the typical university enrollment requirements.

In 1987 artist, educator, and interim director of the Native Art Center Glen Simpson made the Native Arts Center part of the academic system in the Art Department, making it possible for students to receive a BFA in Native Arts. This was a time of flux for the Native Art Center with a number of interim directors, one being James Schoppert, a Tlingit artist. During his life, Schoppert became one of the most prodigious and influential Alaska Native artists of the twentieth century. His work includes carving, painting, poetry and essays. He has been described as an innovator, that made traditional and contemporary Alaska Native works often pushing the boundaries of what was considered "traditional" Northwest Coast art. Throughout his career he was a spokesman for Alaska Native artists and artists in general.

Harry Calkins was an interim instructor from until 1991.

In 1992 Alvin Amason, a Sugpiaq Alaskan painter and sculptor, took over as director of the Native Art Center until his retirement in 2006. It was under Amason's directorship in 2003 the Native Art Center started offering Master of Fine Arts degrees in Native Arts, the only institution in the Alaska to do so.

Da-ka-xeen Mehner, a Tlingit-Nisa'a artist, has been the director of the Native Art Center since 2009.

== See also ==
- Alvin Eli Amason
- University_of_Alaska_Fairbanks#Arts
