= Native Village of Wales =

Alaska Native village

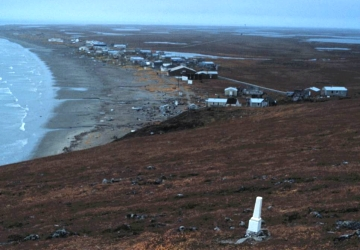
- People: Inupiat
- Headquarters: Wales, Alaska, US

Government
- Chief: Anna Oxereok

Tribal Council
- Native Village of Wales Tribal Council

The Native Village of Wales (Kiŋigin) is a federally recognized Inupiat Alaska Native tribal entity.

== History ==
The Native Village of Wales is headquartered in the city of Wales in the Nome Census Area. According to the Native Village of Wales Tribal Council, the Wales community is "one of the oldest communities in the Bering Strait region." The Native Village of Wales was organized under the Indian Reorganization Act of 1934. As of 2005, the tribe had 267 enrolled citizens.

According to ProPublica, 46 Native American remains of interest to the village are held in the collections of American institutions and have not been repatriated. Three remains have been repatriated to the tribe in the 21st century.

== Citizens ==
- Ronald Senungetuk (1933–2020), artist
- Heidi Aklaseaq Senungetuk, music scholar

== See also ==
- List of Alaska Native tribal entities
- Wales, Alaska
