= Lawrence Paul Yuxweluptun =

Cowichan/Syilx First Nations contemporary artist from Canada

- Born: 1957 (age 68–69); Kamloops, British Columbia
- Notable work: Red Man Watching White Man Trying to Fix Hole in the Sky (1990); Inherent Rights, Vision Rights (1992)

Lawrence Paul Yuxweluptun is a Tsartlip/Syilx First Nations contemporary artist from Canada. His paintings employ elements of Northwest Coast formline design and Surrealism to explore issues as environmentalism, land ownership, and Canada's treatment of First Nations peoples.

== Early life ==
Born in Kamloops, British Columbia in 1957, Yuxweluptun grew up in Kamloops and Richmond, British Columbia. His father, Benjamin Raphael Paul, who died in 1994, belonged to the Cowichan Tribes, a Coast Salish First Nation, and his mother, Evelyn Paul, was Syilx, part of the Okanagan Nation Alliance. He attended the Kamloops Indian Residential School, where his father was an industrial education teacher, from Kindergarten to Grade 2. The family then moved to Richmond, where he attended public school.

Yuxweluptun's upbringing provided an acute awareness of the issues facing Aboriginal peoples. Growing up in a politically active family, his father, an astute politician, was an active member of the North American Indian Brotherhood, and a founder and former head of the Union of British Columbia Indian Chiefs. Yuxweluptun's mother was active in both organizations and led the Indian Homemakers Association of British Columbia. His parents attended many of these meetings with Yuxweluptun in tow. Initially encouraged to pursue a career in politics, instead it is Yuxweluptun's paintings, drawings, and assemblages that give voice to concerns regarding land claims, damaging assimilationist policies, and environmental degradation. From his perspective, "An artist can't do anything if he doesn't watch, observe, and participate in what's going on." "My work is to record."

Yuxweluptun also maintained a close relationship with Coast Salish cultural traditions. At fourteen he was given the right to dance with the X̱wáýx̱way mask and at seventeen was initiated as a Black Face dancer. His name means "man of many masks" and was given to him in his adolescence by the Sxwaixwe Society.

Yuxweluptun attended the Emily Carr College of Art and Design (now University) in the late 1970s and early 1980s and graduated in 1983 with an honours degree in painting.

== Symbolism and technique ==
Yuxweluptun works primarily in painting but has also created multimedia and sculptural works. Many of his pieces show elements of Surrealism as a process of "truth-telling and healing", including similarities to the painted melting objects of Spanish artist, Salvador Dalí. His work incorporates traditional elements from Northwest First Nations art, as well as evocations of the Canadian landscape painting tradition derived from the Group of Seven.

Environmental issues are often central themes in Yuxweluptun's work. His paintings have overtly political statements and titles, and often highlight land use and land ownership issues. Generally, Yuxweluptun's paintings are described as "provocative"; for example, his multimedia piece Residential School Dirty Laundry illustrates a cross made out of children's underwear with red paint to represent blood, and references the treatment of First Nations children in the Canadian Indian residential school system. In 2022, one of his privately commissioned pieces, titled Indian Residential School, Leaving the Shallow Graves and Going Home, was put up for auction with all of the proceeds going to the Orange Shirt Society and Residential School Survivors Society. In a press conference, Yuxweluptun stated the piece was meant to "depict children walking back home in a spirit form, thereby completing a spiritual journey and allowing closure for their memories."

Yuxweluptun is among the most overtly critical artists practicing in Canada today; he depicts the devastating realities that face many Native people through a unique hybridization of Northwest Coast aesthetics—ovoids and stylized formlines—with the dream-like aesthetics of Surrealism. Yuxweluptun's wry appropriation of Surrealism is a reminder of the formative influence of Aboriginal artifacts, including Northwest coast masks, on this movement. He developed this signature style while a student at Emily Carr University. This "deliberate act of reciprocal appropriation" broke with many conventions of Aboriginal art and was initially contentious among both Native and non-Native art communities. Although the ovoid is used in Coast Salish art, formlines which are identifiably Haida and Kwakwaka'wakw also figure prominently in the artist's paintings and drawings. This perceived lack of authenticity with regards to his artistic and cultural heritage is of little concern to Yuxweluptun. In a recent telephone conversation he stated that painting in a more generic Northwest Coast style enables him to more accurately represent what he terms "the imaginary Indian" or "the symbolic Native". The figures in his paintings then are not necessarily representations of real people—or specific Northwest coast beings or ceremonies—but instead comment on the way in which Native identity has been constructed from outside perspectives.

Perhaps the most important achievement of Yuxweluptun's paintings within the context of Canadian landscape painting is his introduction of the politicized landscape. The harsh "toxicological" realities shown in Yuxweluptun's paintings—forests ravaged by clear cuts, water filled with toxic pollution, the figures of bureaucracy (Native and non-Native alike), the abject poverty and abuse on Vancouver's Downtown Eastside—are allegorical and rendered like stunning nightmares with smouldering technicolour palettes. As curator Scott Watson observes, his works invert the subservient role of Native arts and crafts within the development of Canadian Modernism.

== Artwork ==
=== Inherent Rights, Vision Rights ===
Inherent Rights, Vision Rights was one of the first virtual reality (VR) artworks ever made in Canada and was produced between 1991 and 1993 at the Banff Centre for the Arts for the Art and Virtual Environments Project. The work's components included Macintosh and PC computers, a sampler, spatialized sound, custom-made controls and stereoscopic display. It was also the first VR piece to be exhibited by the National Gallery of Canada. It was exhibited at the National Gallery of Canada in 1992 in the exhibition Land, Spirit, Power: First Nations at the National Gallery of Canada / Terre, esprit, pouvoir. Les Premières Nations au Musée des beaux-arts du Canada (Fall, 1992).

Inherent Rights, Vision Rights pioneered new techniques for the exhibition of VR pieces by blending computer-generated 3D sound with figures derived from Yuxweluptun's paintings. The viewer does not wear a helmet to experience the work. Instead, the viewer enters a kiosk similar to an old-fashioned stereoscope, and experiences spatialized sound and computer graphics. The kiosk represents a Longhouse, described in a 1993 edition of Canadian Art as a "simulated cartoon longhouse inhabited by a variety of Yuxweluptun's typical animal spirits and ghosts".

=== Haida Hot Dog ===
One of Yuxweluptun's earlier pieces, the 1984 work Haida Hot Dog, comments in pop-art style on the commodification of First Nations, and particularly Haida, artwork.

=== Scorched Earth, Clear-cut Logging on Native Sovereign Land ===
This piece, created in 1991, was exhibited at the Vancouver Art Gallery in the exhibition Lost Illusions: Recent Landscape Art, curated by Denise Oleksijczuk, in 1991. It was among the first works acquired for the National Gallery of Canada's collection from the exhibition Land, Spirit, Power: First Nations at the National Gallery of Canada. This overtly political painting combines a broad range of influences drawn from the contemporary history of Indigenous peoples, Coast Salish cosmology, Northwest Coast formal design elements, and Western landscape traditions. Yuxweluptun wrote in 1992, "My work is very different from traditional art work. How do you paint a land claim? You can't carve a totem pole that has a beer bottle on it ... I paint this for what it is – a very toxic land base. This is what my ancestral motherland is becoming. Painting is a form of political activism, a way to exercise my inherent right, my right to authority, my freedom ... I can speak out in my paintings even without the recognition of self-government."

== Awards and honours ==
- 1998: Yuxweluptun was the recipient of the Vancouver Institute for the Visual Arts (VIVA) award.
- 2013: Yuxweluptun received a fellowship at the Eitelijorg Museum of American Indians and Western Art in Indianapolis.
- 2019: Yuxweluptun received an honorary doctorate from Emily Carr University.
- 2025: Yuxweluptun was the recipient of the Polygon First Nations Art Award of Distinction for his outstanding contributions to First Nation's Art.
- 2025: Yuxweluptun was awarded the Gershon Iskowitz Prize, a $75,000 award is presented annually to an artist who has made an outstanding contribution to the visual arts in Canada.

== Exhibitions ==
Yuxweluptun's work has been included in numerous international group and solo exhibitions, such as INDIGENA: Contemporary Native Perspectives in 1992 and 1993. INDIGENA was a major touring exhibition of Indigenous art curated by Gerald MacMaster and Lee-Ann Martin. Yuxweluptun was the only artist to be included in both INDIGENA and Land, Spirit, Power: First Nations at the National Gallery of Canada. These two exhibitions are now recognized as pivotal moments in the national recognition of Aboriginal art and which aided in introducing a new generation of Aboriginal artists to the fore.

In 1993, the Morris and Helen Belkin Art Gallery in Vancouver opened their new space with Yuxweluptun's work. This exhibition, Lawrence Paul Yuxweluptun: Born to Live and Die on Your Colonialist Reservations, remains the artist's first and only career survey to date and served to underscore the importance of his work within the Canadian landscape painting tradition for its role in actively challenging many of the genre's conventions.

Yuxweluptun's work appeared in 75 Years of Collecting, the Vancouver Art Gallery's 75th anniversary commemorative exhibition. The exhibition took place throughout 2006 with a four-part series highlighting the history and diversity of the gallery's permanent collection of nearly 9,000 works.

Western Front presented Lawrence Paul Yuxweluptun from March 7 to April 4, 2009. Curated by Candice Hopkins and Mark Soo, the exhibition consisted of a single painting, Guardian Spirits on the Land: Ceremony of Sovereignty (2000) alongside a selection of pulp science fiction novels. The exhibition was held in conjunction with a series of talks by writers that explore Yuxweluptun's work in relation to the genre of science fiction.

Lawrence Paul Yuxweluptun: Neo-Native Drawings and Other Works appeared from March 19 to May 16, 2010, at the Contemporary Art Gallery in Vancouver. This exhibit featured three decades of drawings extending from 1980 to 2009 including works such as tree studies, ovoid portraits, figurative works, etchings, and sketchbooks. Many of the drawings were untitled.

Shore, Forest and Beyond: Art From the Audain Collection, organized by the Vancouver Art Gallery and curated by Ian Thom and Grant Arnold, presented from October 29, 2011, to January 29, 2012. Shore, Forest and Beyond was an exhibition of 100 works gathered from the collection assembled by Michael Audain.

Yuxweluptun's work was exhibited in Sakahàn: International Indigenous Art, the National Gallery of Canada's special exhibition. It ran from May 17 to September 2, 2013, and was deemed the largest-ever global survey of contemporary Indigenous art in 2013.

Unceded Territories, a solo exhibition, was co-curated by Karen Duffek, (MOA Curator, Contemporary Visual Arts & Pacific Northwest) and Tania Willard (artist and independent curator, Secwepemc Nation) at the Museum of Anthropology (MOA), University of British Columbia, in 2016.

Other exhibitions include globally and in Canada, Lawrence Paul Yuxweluptun: Time Immemorial (You're Just Mad Because We Got Here First), Galerie Canada Gallery, Trafalgar Square, London, United Kingdom, 2017; Colour Zone, Plug In ICA, Winnipeg, Manitoba, 2009; An Indian Act: Shooting the Indian Act, Locus+, Newcastle, UK, 1997; Inherent Rights, Vision Rights: Virtual Reality Paintings and Drawings, Canadian Embassy, Paris, 1993; True North: The Landscape Tradition in Contemporary Canadian Art, Kaohsiung Museum of Fine Arts, Taipei, Taiwan; New Territories: 350/500 Years After, Montreal, Quebec (touring); In the Shadow of the Sun, Canadian Museum of Civilization, Hull, Quebec, 1988; and The Warehouse Show, Vancouver, British Columbia, 1983.
