= Heidi Aklaseaq Senungetuk =

American musician and ethnomusicology scholar

- Born: Fairbanks, Alaska
- Education: Bachelor's of Music from Oberlin Conservatory of Music; Master's of Music in Performance from the University of Michigan School of Music; PhD in ethnomusicology from Wesleyan University
- Known for: Musician, educator

Heidi Aklaseaq Senungetuk (/səˈnʌŋɡɛtˌʌk/ sə-NUNG-ɡet-uk) is an Inupiaq scholar of ethnomusicology and a musician. She is the daughter of Ronald Senungetuk and Turid Senungetuk and granddaughter of Helen and Willie Senungetuk, and her family roots originate from Wales (Kiŋigin), Alaska. Senungetuk spent her childhood in Fairbanks, where her father founded the Native Art Center and acted as head of the Department of Art at the University of Alaska.

Senungetuk graduated from Wesleyan University with a doctorate in ethnomusicology. Her research interests include Indigenous practices and performances of music and dance in urban areas throughout the Arctic.

== Career ==
Heidi Aklaseaq Senungetuk received her bachelor's degree in violin performance from the Oberlin College Conservatory of Music and her master's degree from the University of Michigan School of Music. After receiving her doctorate in ethnomusicology from Wesleyan University, she served at McGill University as its first postdoctoral researcher in Indigenous Studies. Subsequently, she was the University of Alaska Anchorage's first postdoctoral fellow in Alaska Native Studies. She taught ethnomusicology as an adjunct professor at the University of Alaska Anchorage before accepting a position as assistant teaching professor in music at Emory University.

Senungetuk has held positions as a violinist with the Louisiana Philharmonic of New Orleans, the Tulsa Philharmonic, the Breckenridge Music Festival in Colorado, and the Anchorage Symphony Orchestra. She has performed as a violinist at the Inuit Artist's World Showcase in Inukjuak, Canada, and at the National Museum of the American Indian in Washington, D.C. in their Classical Native Series. Senungetuk also performed at the National Gallery of Art and the American Museum of Natural History as first violinist with The Coast Orchestra. She is also a member of the Kingikmiut Dancers and Singers of Anchorage.

== Musical practice ==
Trained as a classical violinist, Senungetuk has stated that her goal for her music and dance practice is to challenge "listeners to rethink static images of Indigeneity through expressive media that are at once forward-looking and of the present and that embrace the past". In a 2013 workshop, Senungetuk talks of performing the works of American composer George Rochberg and reinterpreting Rochberg's titles into the Iñupiaq language with the intention "to show the audience what I'm thinking about, what images or ideas inspire me to make music … Indigenous thinking is on the inside of everything that we do, even though at times it may look like some form of assimilation on the outside." Senungetuk's music and dance practice is informed by Indigenous notions of time and a critique of settler-colonialism in classical music studies.

== Writing ==
Senungetuk's written works include an Oxford Bibliography Online article Indigenous Musics of the Arctic (2017), her dissertation Creating a Native Space in the City: An Inupiaq Community in Song and Dance (2017), and the prologue for the book Music and Modernity Among First Peoples of North America (Wesleyan University Press, 2019).

== Select exhibitions ==
A select list of exhibitions in which Senungetuk was involved:

- Soundings: An Exhibition in Five Parts (2019–2023), curated by Candice Hopkins and Dylan Robinson. The exhibition toured multiple galleries, including the Morris and Helen Belkin Art Gallery.
- 2022 Whitney Biennial Raven Chacon's ‘For Zitkála-Šá’ included 13 scores for various performance artists. Senungetuk was the opening performer of the Whitney series, and one of the 13 artists represented in Chacon's scores.
- TUSARNITUT! Music Born of the Cold (2022–2023), curated by Jean-Jacques Nattiez, Lisa Qiluqqi Koperqualuk, and Charissa von Harringa and organized by the Montreal Museum of Fine Arts.
- Inuit Artist World Showcase (1996), where Senungetuk performed as a classical violinist.

== Artistic projects ==
- Qutaanuaqtuit: Dripping Music, a concert-conference and video art installation that connects Senungetuk's family's history to several works on the violin. The performance/installation toured multiple galleries in connection with the exhibitions TUSARNITUT! Music Born of the Cold and Soundings: An Exhibition in Five Parts.
