= Bill Holm (art historian) =

American art historian (1925–2020)

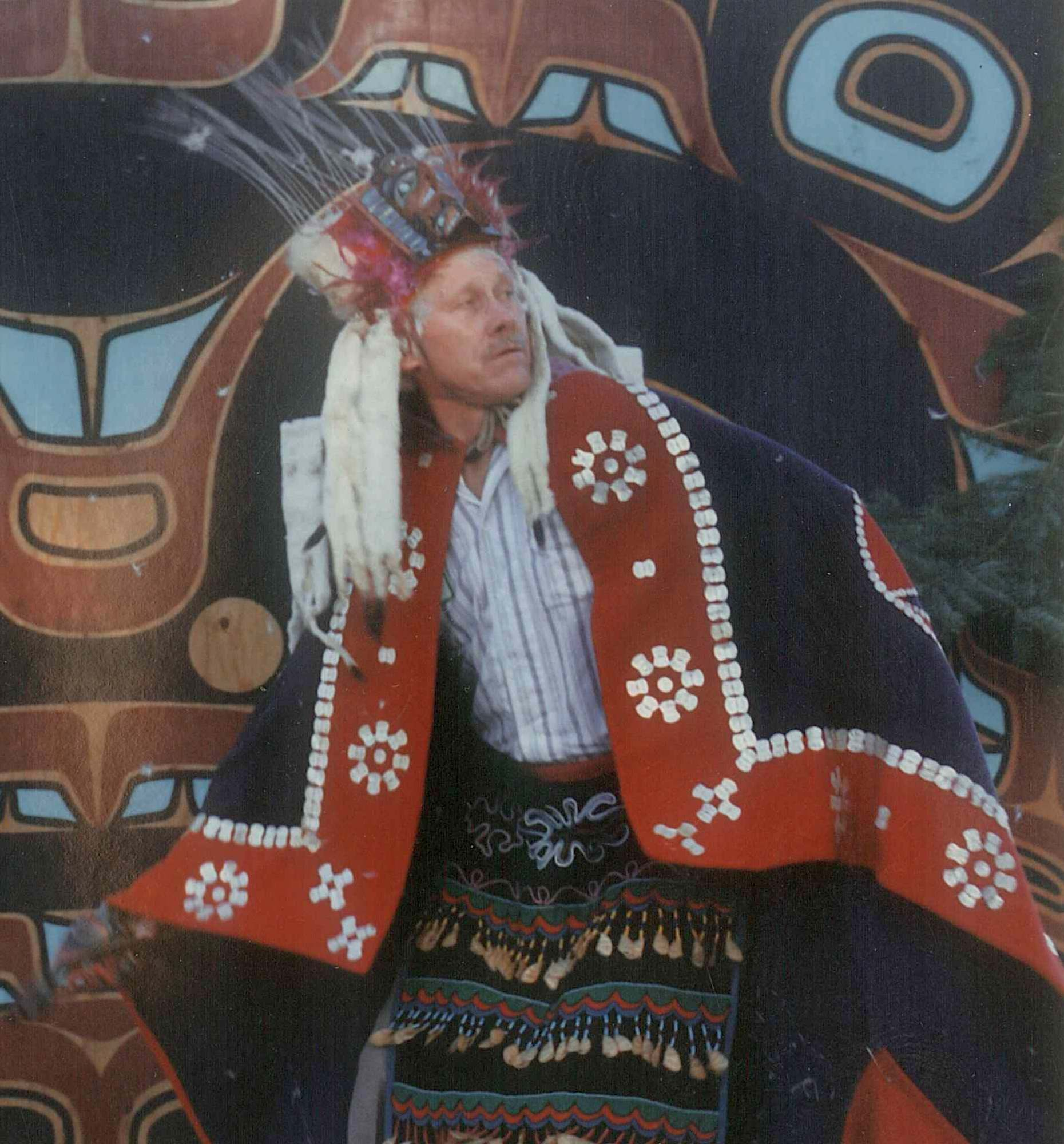
- Holm in 1987
- Born: O. William Holm Jr. March 24, 1925; Roundup, Montana, U.S.
- Died: December 16, 2020 (aged 95); Shoreline, Washington, U.S.
- Other name: Kwakʼwala: Namsgamuti
- Occupations: Art historian, artist

O. William Holm Jr. (March 24, 1925 – December 16, 2020) was an American art historian and author who worked and published under the name Bill Holm. His specialty was First Nations Northwest Coast art, and he was known for creating much of the vocabulary used to describe formline design. Holm's book Northwest Coast Indian Art: An Analysis of Form (1965) has been a foundational work in the study of this art.

== Background ==
Holm was born on March 24, 1925, in Roundup, Montana to electrician Oscar Holm and teacher Martha Holm. His family moved to Seattle, Washington, when Holm was twelve. Soon after, he became acquainted with Erna Gunther, Director of the Washington State Museum (later the Burke Museum). Holm had a childhood interest in Plains Indians, so Gunther provided him with information about the Native peoples of the region where he now lived.

During World War II, Holm enlisted in the army and served as part of a field artillery observation battalion in France. He ultimately earned the rank of master sergeant. Holm attended the University of Washington School of Art, receiving a bachelor's degree in art (1949) and a master of fine arts in painting (1951). After receiving a teaching certificate in 1953, Holm began teaching art at Lincoln High School in Seattle, Washington, and continued working there until 1968. He also married Martha (Marty) Mueller in 1953. They had met in 1949 while working at Henderson Camp on Lopez Island, Washington.

Holm began working at Henderson Camp, a summer camp later renamed Camp Nor'wester, in 1942. Later he and his wife struck up a friendship with Mungo Martin, which led to Holm recording hundreds of Kwakwaka'wakw songs as well as him creating "big houses" and totem poles at camp locations on Lopez Island and Johns Island, carving dance masks and four Haida-style canoes, and much more. Martin would give Holm the names Namsgamuti (He Speaks Only Once), Hamtsi'stesalagalis (Unrestrained Hamatsa Everywhere), and Ho'miskanis (Plenty of Everything, literally, Surplus Food from the River). Holm was also named Tlalelitla (Continually Inviting) by Chief William Scow, Henry Bell, and Joe Seaweed. British Columbia Provincial judge Alfred Scow, a Kwakwaka'wakw elder, said "[Bill Holm] has been a respectful student of our tradition, who took pains to learn Kwakwala. He is a very thorough art historian."

Still under the guidance of Erna Gunther, Holm continued his study of northern Northwest Coast art. He wrote a paper on the structure of that art during a graduate seminar she led while he was working towards an advanced teaching certificate in the later 1950s. Gunther and others encouraged him to work on this further, which he did. This work eventually became Northwest Coast Indian Art: An Analysis of Form, which was published by University of Washington Press in 1965. It has been in continuous print since then, and the 50th-anniversary edition, with new commentary, was published in 2014.

In 1968, Holm was hired as Curator of Education at the Burke Museum and Lecturer in the University of Washington School of Art. Ultimately, he was Curator of Northwest Coast Indian Art and Professor of Art History. He taught three classes a year on Northwest Coast Native art. His work influenced many artists and scholars. Among Holm's PhD students were Robin Wright, who founded the Bill Holm Center at the Burke Museum, and Barbara Brotherton, who was Curator of Native American art at the Seattle Art Museum. He retired from the University of Washington and Burke Museum in 1985.

Holm and his wife had two daughters: Carla and Karen. His best friend was Donn Charnley, a retired geology professor at Shoreline Community College and former Washington State senator and representative.

== Honors ==
Holm's eight books have won scholarly acclaim and recognition with four Washington State Governor's Writers Awards, and two special Governor's awards.

The Native American Art Studies Association recognized him with its Honor Award in 1991. The University of Washington honored him with a Distinguished Achievement Award from the College of Arts and Sciences in 1994 and selected him to give the annual University Faculty Lecture in 2003. In 2001, Holm was honored with a certificate of appreciation from the Tlingit, Haida, and Tsimshian people of Southeast Alaska through the Sealaska Heritage Institute.

== Visual art ==
A series of large paintings by Holm introduced Northwest Native motifs in the gallery of Northwest Coast art at the 1962 Seattle World's Fair in the Century 21 Exposition. Many of his paintings are cataloged in the 2000 book, Sun Dogs and Eagle Down, The Indian Paintings of Bill Holm (ISBN 978-0295979472).

== Bibliography ==
- (1965) Northwest Coast Indian Art, An Analysis of Form. University of Washington Press, Seattle.
- (1972) Crooked Beak of Heaven. Index of Art in the Pacific Northwest, No. 3, University of Washington Press, Seattle.
- (1975) Form and Freedom: A Dialogue on Northwest Coast Indian Art (with Bill Reid). Institute for the Arts, Rice University, Houston.
- (1976) Indian Art of the Northwest Coast: A Dialogue on Craftsmanship and Aesthetics.(republication of Form and Freedom) University of Washington Press, Seattle.
- (1980) Edward S. Curtis in the Land of the War Canoes: A Pioneer Cinematographer in the Pacific Northwest. (with George I. Quimby) University of Washington Press, Seattle.
- (1982) Soft Gold: The Fur Trade and Cultural Exchange on the Northwest Coast of America. (with Thomas Vaughan). Oregon Historical Society, Portland.
- (1983) Smoky-Top: The Art and Times of Willie Seaweed. University of Washington Press, Seattle.
- (1983) The Box of Daylight: Northwest Coast Indian Art. Seattle Art Museum and University of Washington Press, Seattle.
- (1987) Spirit and Ancestor: a Century of Northwest Coast Art in the Burke Museum. University of Washington Press.
- (2000) Sundogs and Eagle Down: the Indian Paintings of Bill Holm, by Stephen C. Brown and Lloyd J. Averill. University of Washington Press.

== Filmography ==
- (1973) The Kwakiutl of British Columbia. A film made in 1930 by Franz Boas. Edited and with notes by Bill Holm. University of Washington Press, Seattle.
- (1973) In the Land of the War Canoes. A film made in 1914 by Edward S. Curtis. Edited and with sound track directed by Bill Holm. University of Washington Press, Seattle.
- (1980) The Image Maker and the Indian. (with George I.Quimby) University of Washington Press, Seattle.
