= Ronald Senungetuk =

Inupiaq artist from Alaska (1933–2020)

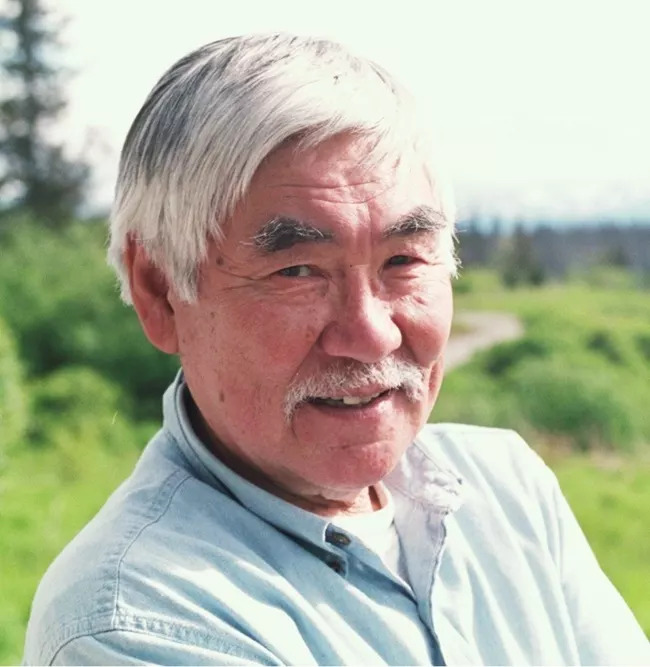
- Born: 1933; Wales, Territory of Alaska
- Died: January 21, 2020 (aged 87)
- Citizenship: Native Village of Wales and U.S.
- Education: Rochester Institute of Technology
- Known for: sculpture, jewelry, painting
- Movement: Alaska Native art
- Awards: Fulbright Fellowship

Ronald Senungetuk (/səˈnʌŋɡɛtˌʌk/ sə-NUNG-ɡet-uk; 1933 – January 21, 2020) (last name pronounced Sinuŋituk in Iñupiaq) was an Iñupiaq artist originally from Wales, Alaska, who worked primarily in wood and metal.

== Background and education ==
He is a citizen of the Native Village of Wales, a federally recognized Alaska Native tribe. Senungetuk was a sculptor and silversmith and was known for his abstractions of animal figures. He attended the Bureau of Indian Affairs school in Sitka, Alaska before training at the School for American Craftsmen at the Rochester Institute of Technology in New York and received his B.A. in 1960. Senungetuk received a Fulbright Fellowship to study at Statens håndverks- og kunstindustriskole in Oslo, Norway.

He and his wife, Turid, an accomplished silversmith, lived in Homer.

== Education career ==
Senungetuk taught at the University of Alaska Fairbanks beginning in 1961. He founded their metalsmithing program and served as director of its Native Art Center. During his teaching career, he emphasized modern styles of jewelry-making, avant-garde concepts, and respect for Native traditional imagery.

Abraham Anghik Ruben (Inuvialuk/Yup'ik) was one of Senungetuk's students.

== Art career ==
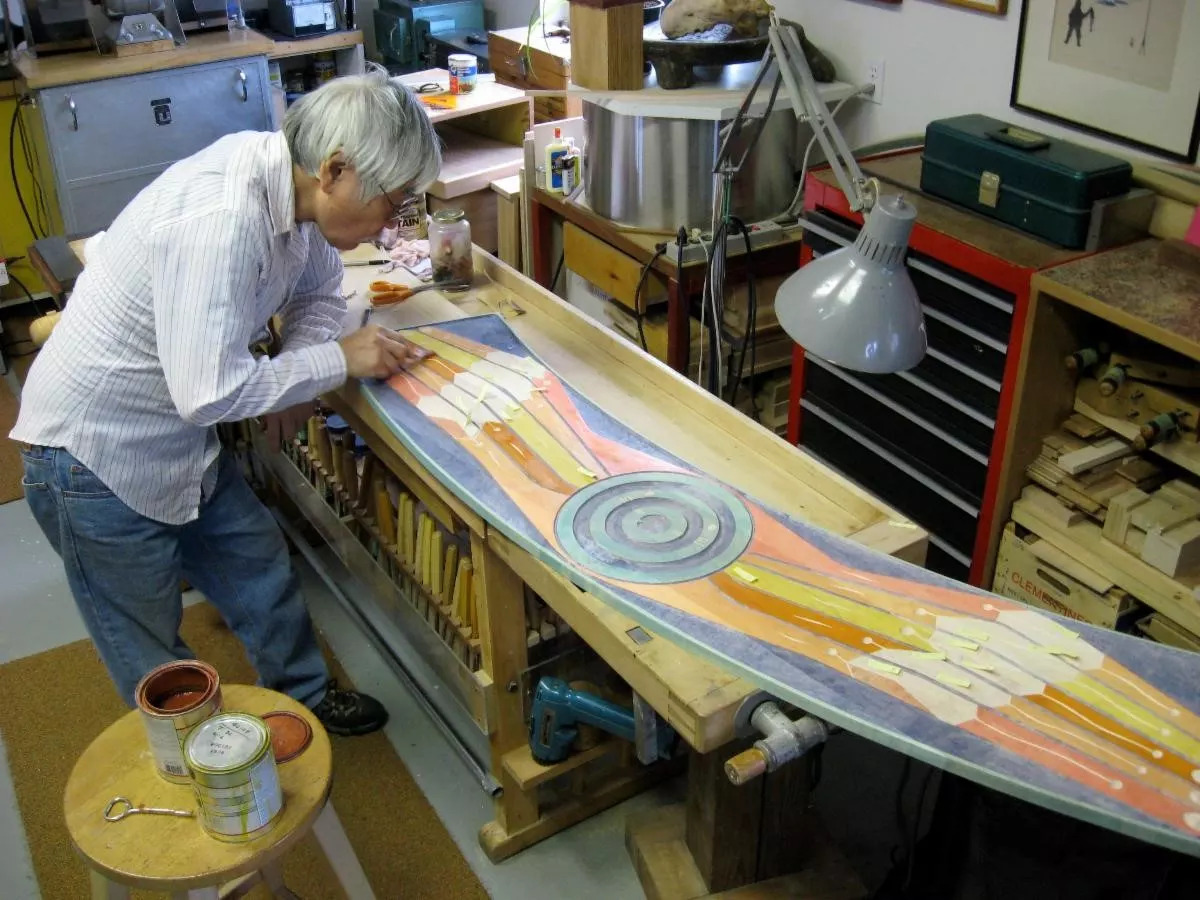
Senungetuk working on a Tingmeaqpuk (a giant bird) for the Denali Visitor Center exhibit. The art piece is a component of a large border surrounding the topographic model at the visitor center. The piece represents the Western/Beringia portion of Alaska.

Senungetuk preferred not to be identified solely as a Native artist and said: "A lot of people will call you an Eskimo artist. I'd rather be an artist who happened to be Inupiat."

His work was exhibited at the Anchorage Museum, the Museum of the North at the University of Alaska Fairbanks, the Native Medical Center in Anchorage, and the Pratt Museum in Homer.

== Family ==
His daughter is a musician and ethnomusicology scholar Heidi Aklaseaq Senungetuk.

== Awards and recognition ==
- 1979: State of Alaska Governor's Award for the Arts
- 2008: Denali National Park Artist-in-Residence
- 2008: Rasmuson Foundation Distinguished Artist Award

== See also ==
- Alaska Native art
- Inuit art
