= Alaska Native Arts Foundation =

U.S. non-profit organization

- Type: Non-Profit
- Industry: Cultural arts
- Founded: Anchorage, Alaska, USA (2002)
- Headquarters: Anchorage, Alaska
- Key people: Trina Landlord, Executive Director; Board of Directors: Perry Eaton, Chair; Alvin Amason, Susie Bevins-Ericsen, Da-ka-xeen Mehner, Barbara Overstreet, Mary Sattler, Veronica Slajer, Cheryl Frasca and Georgia Blue
- Number of employees: 2 (2014)

The Alaska Native Arts Foundation (2002–present) is a non-profit organization formed to support the Alaska Native art community. Its mission is focused on the advancement of Indigenous art into global marketplaces to enhance economic development in the state of Alaska and create fairly-priced markets for Alaska Native art. The Foundation also seeks to provide general awareness and public education of Alaska's Indigenous cultures, and as a result offered programs to support Alaska Native artists and preserve cultural heritage. Funded by a combination of government grants and private funding in the form of donations from Alaska Native corporations, the organization distributed grant money through project support programs to provide in-residence art programs, educational programs for rural schools, funding for museum demonstrations, art workshops, and exhibitions and documentation of native artists' work.

== Curation of Native Works ==
The Native Arts Foundation gallery in Anchorage, which opened in 2006 presented and curated the works of Native artists, including visual art, spoken word, performance art and choreography, dance, fashion, and video, as well as presenting works created during privately organized workshops and business training. Outside of Alaska, the foundation also promoted Alaskan Native art at events and festivals in Pittsburgh, Washington D.C., Paris, and Miami.

In addition, the Foundation maintained extensive inventory of Native art and utilitarian handmade items of all sorts, based on the "subsistence" lifestyle of their makers: walrus ivory carvings, baleen etchings and baskets, whalebone sculpture, salmon and halibut skin baskets, fish skin crafts, caribou antler dolls dressed in traditional sealskin clothing, bronze sculpture and oil and acrylic paintings; and wearable art and accessories: jewelry, carved masks, traditional "ulu" knives, traditional mukluks made using natural material, summer parkas, beaded gowns using quills and moose hide, bolo ties, walrus whisker earrings, "scrimshaw" belt buckles, and silver, gold and copper jewelry.

== Closure ==
The Foundation went dormant in the spring of 2016 as the result of lost state funding and low markups on sold art. The physical gallery in downtown Anchorage was closed. At the time of closure, the stock of the Foundation gallery was made available for private sale, and services were phased out to accommodate future marketing efforts.

== Relaunch ==
In 2023, the Alaska Native Arts Foundation was relaunched with new funding. As opposed to the curation and reopening of a physical gallery, the new concept consisted of an online portal for Alaska Native artists and an innovative digital marketplace that directly connects buyers with Indigenous art. The web launch is set for early 2024.
