= James Schoppert =

Tlingit artist (1947–1992)

James "Jim" Schoppert
- Born: May 28, 1947; Juneau, Alaska
- Died: September 2, 1992 (aged 45); Ojai, California
- Known for: Woodcarving, sculpture, painting, poetry
- Movement: Northwest Coast art, contemporary Native art

Robert James "Jim" Schoppert (May 28, 1947 – September 2, 1992) was an Tlingit Alaska Native artist and educator. His work includes woodcarving, painting, poetry, and essays. He has been described as an innovator, whose works pushed the boundaries of what was expected from Northwest Coast art.

Throughout his career he spoke on behalf of Alaska Native artists and visual artists in general. He taught at the University of Alaska Fairbanks (UAF) as a guest professor and gave presentations and lectures at elementary schools throughout the states of Alaska and Washington.

== Early life ==
Schoppert was born in Juneau, Alaska to a Tlingit (/ˈklɪŋkɪt/ or /ˈtlɪŋɡɪt/) mother and a father of German descent.

== Career ==
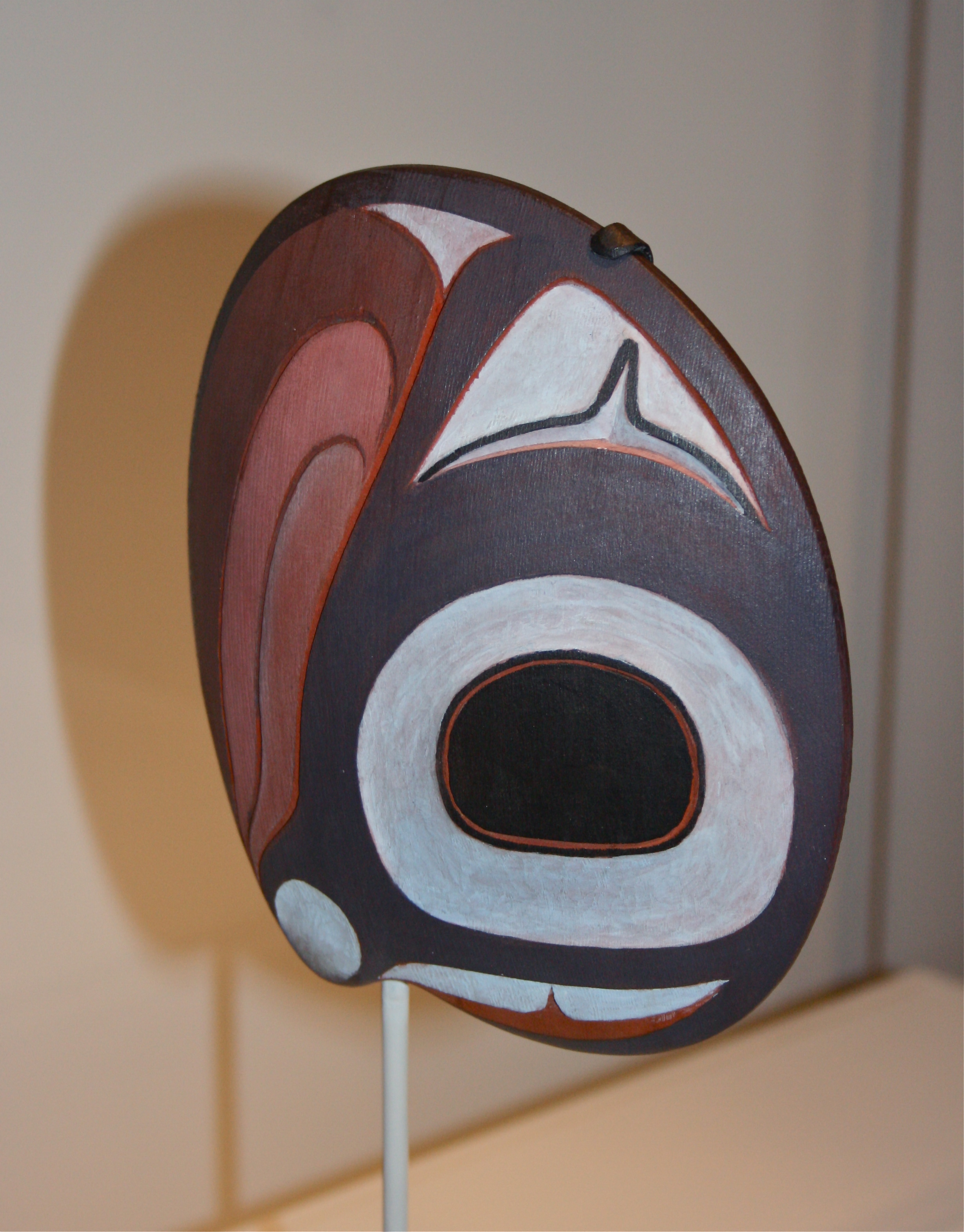
Clam Shell (1992) – wood, pigment, glue rattle

In 1973, Schoppert came to Anchorage for a construction job which, it turned out, was no longer available. On February 26 of that year, using the last of his money, he bought a piece of soapstone and carved an owl. He put it up for sale at the urging of his sister and was able to sell it quickly, which marked the formal beginning of his career as an artist. Understanding that knowledge was important, he went on to earn a BFA from the University of Alaska Anchorage and a MFA from the University of Washington. But "his apprenticeship was with himself" according to Steven Brown, associate curator at the Seattle Art Museum. Continuing to produce work while still an undergraduate, he won first place in the statewide Earth, Fire and Fiber juried show in 1976. This sculpture should have been an indication of things to come as it was a separation from his customary work which would define him as an artist and create controversy and curiosity in later years. Although he created art using the formline, he chose a different approach for a great deal of his work that did not neatly fit into either mainstream or Northwest Coast art. He was quoted as saying "There is tremendous pressure for conformity from collectors and scholars, who want work that fits into the classic definition of Northwest Indian art. When things don't fit their expectations there's a raised eyebrow, and a sort of suggestion of 'What do we do with it now?'". This mindset is what allowed Schoppert to create his most recognizable pieces which are large carved panels made of multiple planks, painted in colors not associated with historical Tlingit carving, and the planks rearranged to create an entirely new look and a break from established methods and formline. Examples of this style are seen in his works Teasing Eagle and Raven Opens Box of Stars.

During his career as an artist he also served on the state arts councils of both Alaska and Washington. He created the North Coast Indian flat design that is on the entrance to the west end of the I-90 Mount Baker Tunnel in Seattle. There are several of his works throughout Alaska and Washington. This includes one of the last pieces he made, a large carving for the Port of Seattle to be installed at the Seattle–Tacoma International Airport.

== Artwork ==
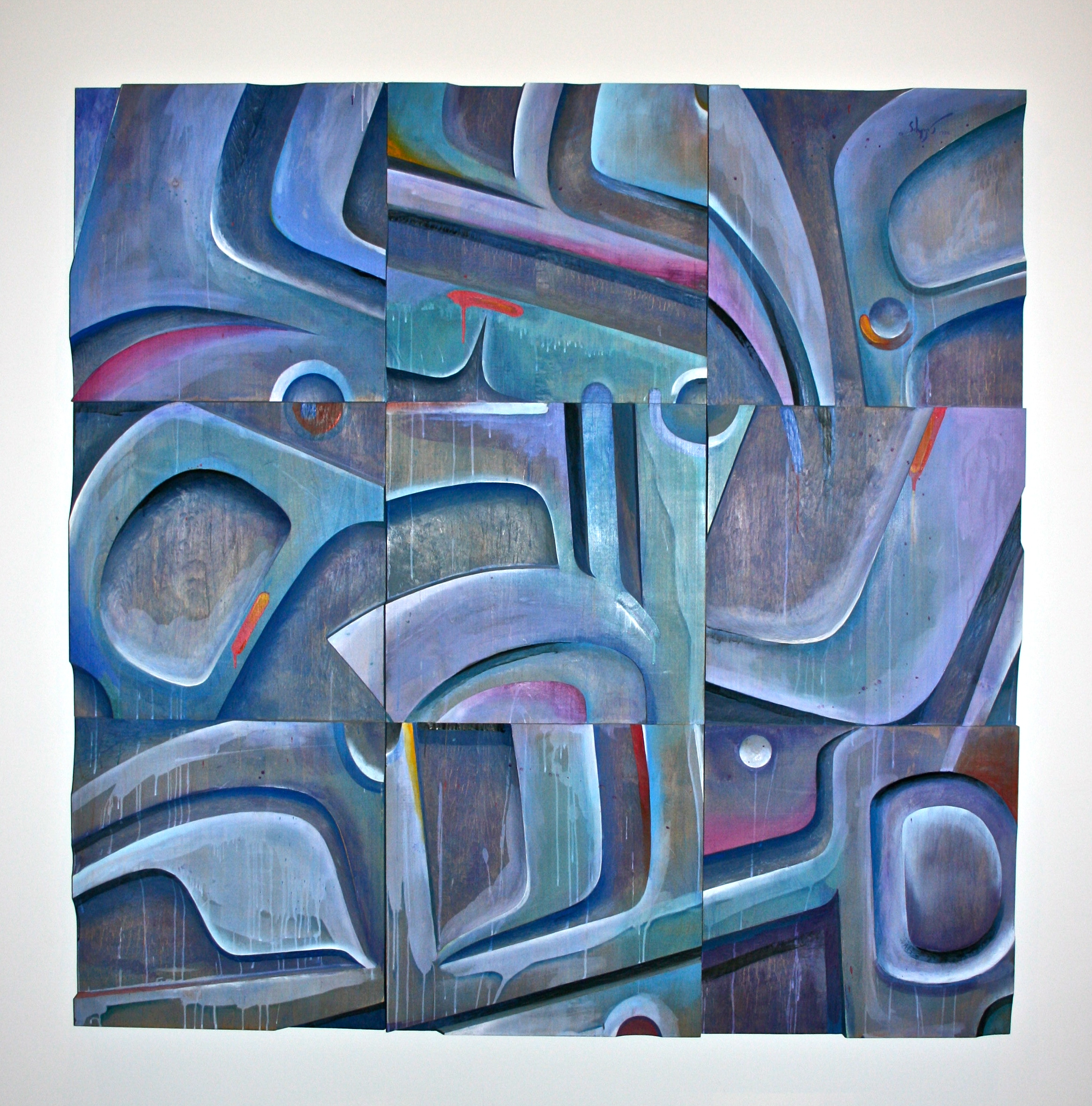
Blueberries (1986).

Schoppert's artwork covered a wide range of techniques such as woodcarving, abstract paintings, drawings, mask making, and, most notably, his large, carved panel pieces. The wood panel pieces are also what created some controversy over whether his art was mainstream or Northwest Coastal. Schoppert learned that the Tlingit formline that was considered the customary method was only a relatively recent development among the Northwest Indian. It was his opinion that enforcing the practices of the 1850s or 1950s as the rule for all time amounted to artistic tyranny. He has been quoted as saying "Learn the rules, then break them". When talking about his panels, his intention was to further the art by following what he considered its natural progression. "If Art has a Master, Imagination cracks the whip".(1987) It is clear that he was true to his beliefs when examining his work. He went beyond the boundaries of established Northwest Coastal art and was a contributor to the evolution of contemporary Native art.

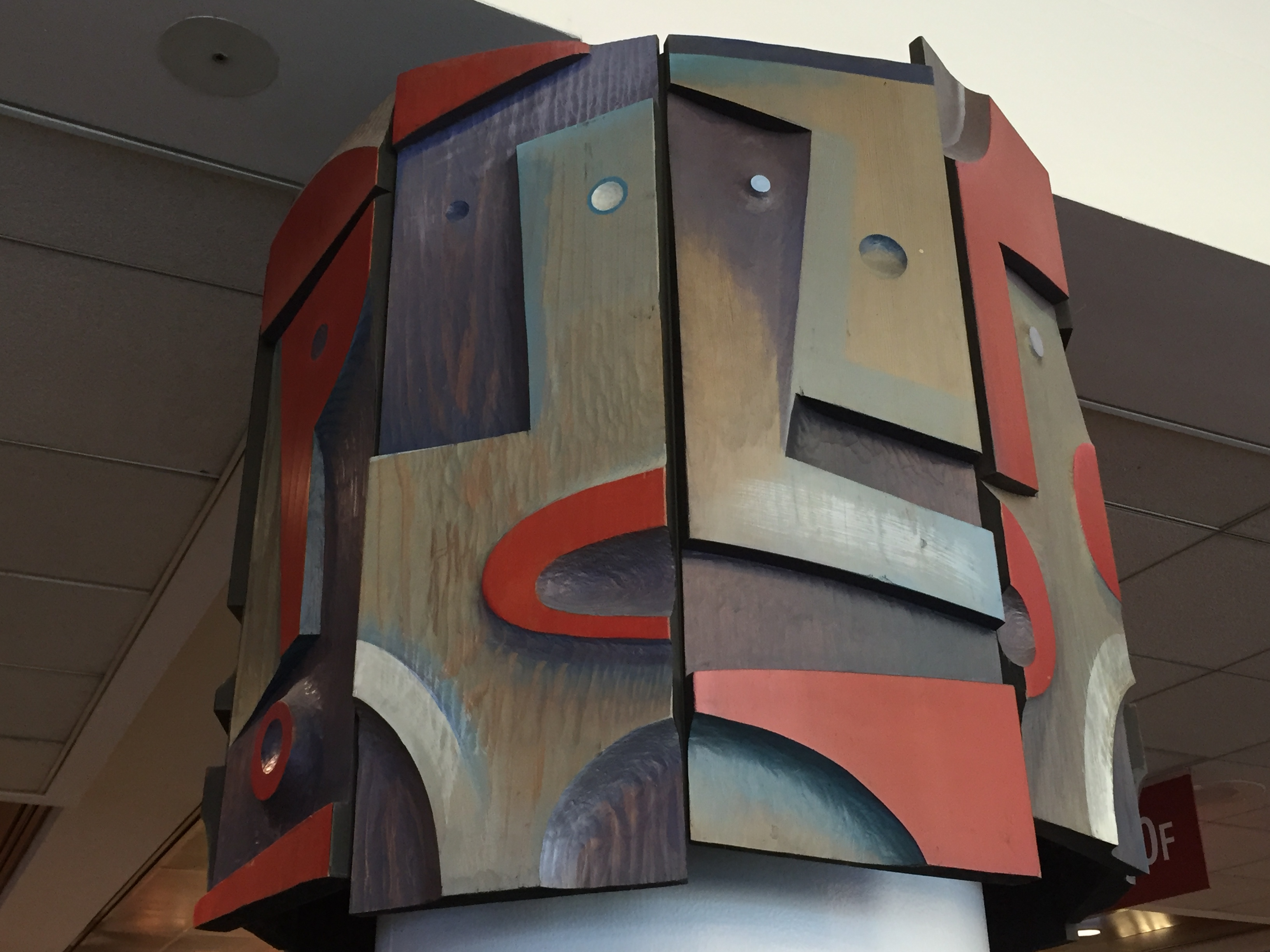
Modern Mask 1992

Although Schoppert is best known for his panels, he also produced several pieces that followed conventional methods and formline design. This is most evident in his mask making, an example of Jim using this style can be found in his mask Forehead Mask (1977) and Mussel Shell Rattle (1992). In addition he had several paintings and drawings that incorporate Indigenous subject matter but do not use of formline.

=== Exhibitions ===
- 1984: "The New Native American Aesthetic", Marilyn Butler Gallery, Santa Fe
- 1984: C.N. Gorman Museum at University of California, Davis
- 1985: "New Ideas from Old Traditions", Yellowstone Arts Center
- 1985: North Central Washington Museum, Wenatchee, WA
- 1985: "Visage Transcended: Contemporary Native American Masks", American Indian Contemporary Arts Gallery, San Francisco
- 1985: Second Biennial Invitational, Heard Museum, Phoenix
- 1986: "What is Native American Art?'"
- 1989: "Native American Expressions of Surrealism", Sacred Circle Gallery, Seattle
- 1990: "Northern Lights", SunRunner, Ojai, CA
- 1990: "Eleven Stories", Sacred Circle Gallery, Seattle
- 1991: "Eleventh Anniversary Show", Stonington Gallery, Seattle
- 1991: "Raw Materials", Sacred Circle Gallery, Seattle
- 1991: "A Northern Perspectives", The Legacy Ltd., Seattle
- 1992: "Salmon:Ritual and Resource," Stonington Gallery, Seattle
- 1992: "Visions of Alaska", Denise Wallace Gallery, Santa Fe
- 1992: "Instrument of Change: Retrospective Exhibition", Smithsonian National Museum of the American Indian, George Gustav Heye Center New York City

==== Posthumous ====
Schoppert's final exhibition was hosted by the Anchorage Museum at Rasmuson Center seven years after he died, putting together a traveling exhibit that contained 50 pieces of art, and selected essays and poems as a tribute to a great Alaska Native artist and recognized him as transformational "whose unique artistic expression contributed to the evolution of contemporary native art". Sponsored by the National Museum of the American Indian, this exhibit was displayed in the Smithsonian Institution from October 3, 1999, to February 6, 2000, at the museum's George Gustav Heye Center.
