= Alvin Eli Amason =

American painter (born 1948)

Alvin Eli Amason (born 1948) is a Sugpiaq Alaskan painter and sculptor. He was raised in Kodiak and is of Alutiiq ancestry. He received his Master of Fine Arts from Arizona State University and taught for several years at Navajo Community College. For seventeen years, he taught at the University of Alaska Fairbanks and was the head of the Alaska Native Art studies program there. After retiring, he was asked to join the Department of Art at the University of Alaska, Anchorage and develop an Alaska Native Art curriculum.

Amason was raised by his grandfather, a bear guide. He considered other careers, including engineering, before becoming an artist and sculptor. In 1973, he received a Bachelor of Arts degree from Central Washington University and received a Master of Fine Arts degree from Arizona State University in 1976.

After graduation, he painted and taught art in the American Southwest. He was the chair of Navajo Community College's Art Department from 1976 to 1978. In 1978, he took a position as a lecturer at University of Great Falls in Montana. He received a position at the University of Alaska in 1984, and the Visual Arts Center of Alaska in 1989. In 1992 he took a position as director of the Native Art Center of the University of Alaska in Fairbanks, Alaska, from which he retired in 2009. He then joined the Art Department at the University of Alaska Anchorage to develop an Alaska Native Arts curriculum and studio.

Amason has served on the Alaska State Council on the Arts and the boards of the Institute of Alaska Native Arts and the Alaska Native Arts Foundation. In 2018, Amason was recognized with the Governor's Individual Artist Award for Arts and Humanities.

Amason has created paintings and multi-media artworks for Anchorage International Airport and the U.S. Federal Courthouse Building in Anchorage, as well as public schools in Alaska.

Amason's work has been in invitational shows in Alaska, Arizona, Michigan, Montana, Oklahoma, and Washington, DC, and his works are in the Nordjyllands Kunstmuseum in Denmark, the University of Alaska Museum of the North, the Alaska State Museum, the Smithsonian American Art Museum, and the Heard Museum.

== Exhibitions ==
- 2019 "Place of Origin" Rovaniemi Museum, Finland
- 2019 Aiviq and Nanuq exhibition, Anchorage Museum, Anchorage, AK
- 2019 "The Inspirations" Alaska State Museum, Juneau, AK
- 2016 "UAA Faculty Exhibition" Kimura Gallery, Anchorage, AK
- 2013 "Re/Marks, works from the collection of the Anchorage Museum" Rasmusen Center, Anchorage, AK
- 2012 "Open House" Magpie Artworks, Anchorage, AK
- 2012 "Amason and Eaton" Magpie Artworks, Anchorage, AK
- 2011 "The Alaskans, Masks" Stonington Gallery, Seattle, WA
- 2009 "Brothers on the Water" Alaska House, New York, NY
- 2009 "United Nations' Permanent Forum on Indigenous" New York, NY
- 2007 "Alvin and Lena Amason" Artique Gallery, Anchorage, AK
- 2005 "N.Y.C Alaska" New York, NY
- 2005 "Native Arts Now" Kenai Culture Center, Kenai, AK
- 2004 "Alvin Amason & Kesler Woodward" Well Street Art Gallery, Fairbanks, AK
- 2004 "Native Art Invitational" Well Street Art Gallery, Fairbanks, AK
- 2003 "Heart of My Home" Decker Morris Gallery, Anchorage, AK
- 2003 "Gallery Artist" Well Street Art Company, Fairbanks, AK
- 2003 "Shaped by Design" Anchorage Museum at Rasmusen Center, Anchorage, AK
- 2001 "Alaska Native Contemporary Art" Anchorage Museum at Rasmusen Center, Anchorage, AK
- 2001 "Gallery Artist Show" Decker/Morris Gallery, Anchorage, AK
- 2000 "Art in Two Worlds" Heard Museum, Phoenix, AZ
- 1990 "New Art of the West" Eitelijorg Museum, Indianapolis, IN
- 1989 "Multi-Media Work" Carnegie Art Center, Walla Walla, WA
- 1985-87 "Alaska Native Heritage Festival" Anchorage Museum of History and Art, Anchorage AK
- 1985 "Western States Prints Invitational" Portland Art Museum, Portland OR
- 1984 "50 States, 50 Artists" Fuller Goldeen Gallery, San Francisco
- 1984 "Innovations" Heard Museum, Phoenix, AZ
- 1984 "Uniquely American: The West Coast" Art Train, Detroit, Michigan
- 1981 "Magic Images" Philbrook Art Center, Tulsa, OK
- 1981 "Art of the States: Nine Alaskans" Alaska State Museum, AK
- 1980 "Across the Nation: Fine Art for Federal Buildings 1972-1979" Hunter Museum of Art, Chattanooga, TN
- 1980 "Spirit of the Earth" Native American Center of Living Arts, Niagara Falls, NY

== Collections ==
- Institute of American Indian Art, Santa Fe, NM
- National Collection of France at Chatau-Muse'e, Boulogne-sur-mer, France
- Know Your Birds series, Clark Middle School, Anchorage, AK
- Fish Mama, William Tyson Elementary School, Anchorage, AK
- Looking Around, Para Transit Center, Anchorage, AK
- Alyeska Pipeline Company, Corporate Collection, Anchorage, AK
- Koniag Native Corporation, Anchorage, AK
- Doyon Corporation, Anchorage, AK
- I Grew Up with Them Birds; One of a Kind, University of Alaska Museum of the North, Fairbanks, AK
- Eiteljorg Museum, Indianapolis, IN
- His Holiness, Patriarch Alexy II, Patriarch of Moscow and all Russia
- Bull, Smithsonian American Art Museum, Smithsonian Institution, Washington D.C.
- Raven, National Museum of the American Indian, Smithsonian Institution, Washington D.C.
- Every day I'm loving you so much more, Nordjyllands Kunstmuseum, Aalborg, Denmark
- Chignik Rose, Federal Bldg., Anchorage, AK
- Indian Arts and Craft Board, Department of Interior, Washington D.C.
- Kansas City Art Institute, Kansas City, MO
- So Tall, Kemper Museum of Contemporary Art, Kansas City, MO
- Heard Museum, Phoenix, AZ
- State of Alaska Art Bank, Anchorage, AK
- Alaska State Museum, Juneau, AK
- Welcome to My World, Ted Stevens Anchorage Int'l Airport, Anchorage, AK
- Pretty Close, Big Sum Bich #2, Alutiiq Museum, Kodiak, AK
- Everything I Love is Here; Grandma said the eyes are good medicine; Papa said seals are one bump, otters are two. There goes Steve Harvey; Good to See You, Oh My Heart; Humpy Catcher; Happy Humpy Catcher Anchorage Museum at Rasmuson Center, Anchorage, AK

== (selected) Bibliography ==
- Conti, Michael (2017). Artist Profile: Alvin Amason. Anchorage Museum at Rasmuson Center.
- Quinlan, Chelsea (2016). "Our Story" Alvin Amason. Anchorage Museum.
- Jonaitis, Aldona ed. (1998) Looking North: Art from the University of Alaska Museum. University of Washington Press.
- Smith, Barbara Sweetland and Barnett, Raymond J. (1990). Russian America, the Forgotten Frontier. Washington State Historical Society.
- Fitzhugh, William W. and Crowell, Aron (1988). Crossroads of Continents. Smithsonian Institution Press.
- Ray, Dorthy Jean (1981). Aleut and Eskimo Art. University of Washington Press.
- Thalacker, Donald (1980). The Place of Art in the World of Architecture. Chelsea House.

== External links used as sources ==
- "Alvin Amason." St. James Guide to Native North American Artists. St. James Press, 1998.
- University of Alaska Native Arts Program
