= Alaska Native art =

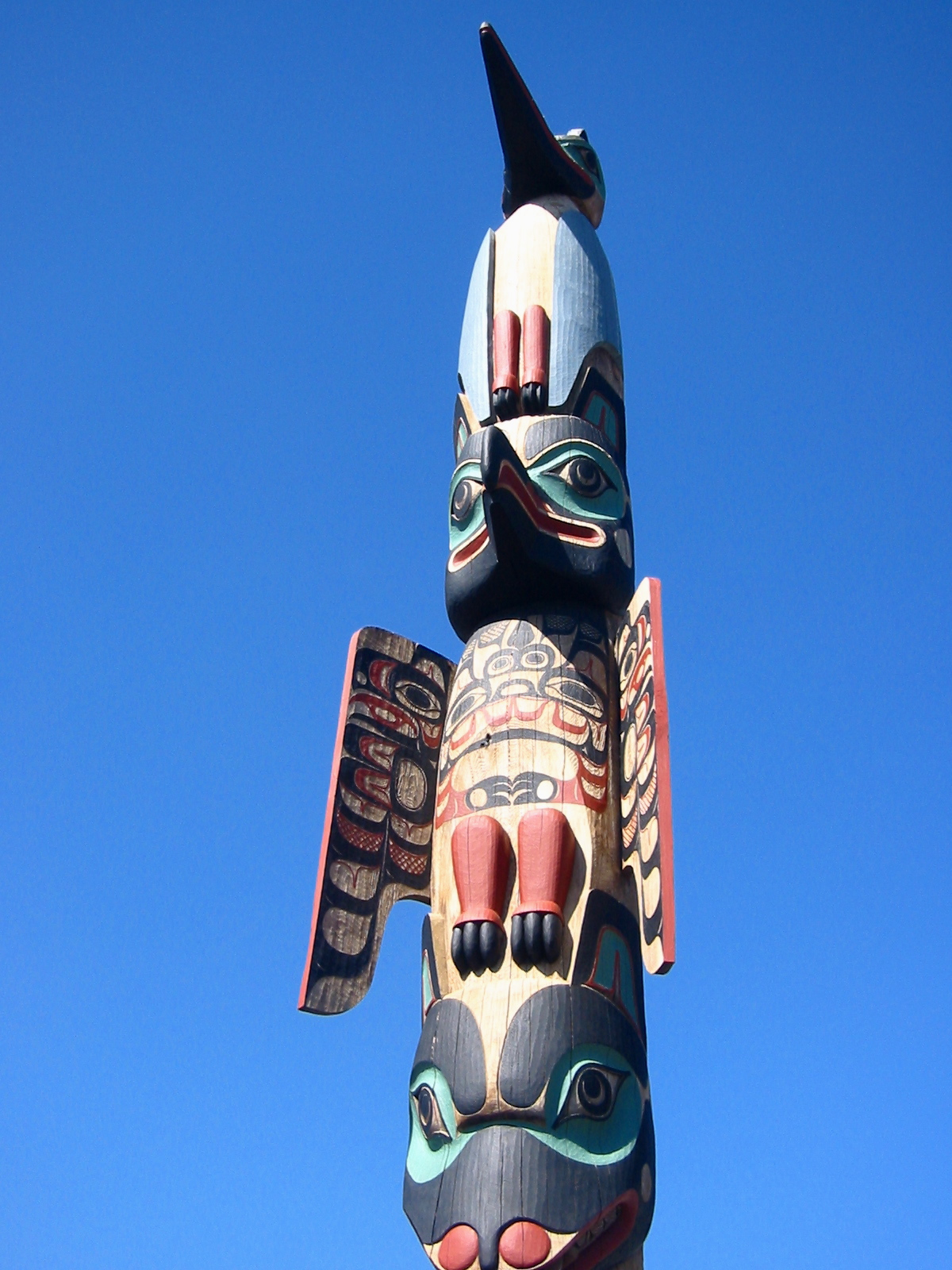
Detail of a Tlingit totem pole, Ketchikan, Alaska

Alaska Native cultures are rich and diverse, and their art forms are representations of their history, skills, tradition, adaptation, and nearly twenty thousand years of continuous life in some of the most remote places on earth. These art forms are largely unseen and unknown outside the state of Alaska, due to distance from the art markets of the world.

== History ==
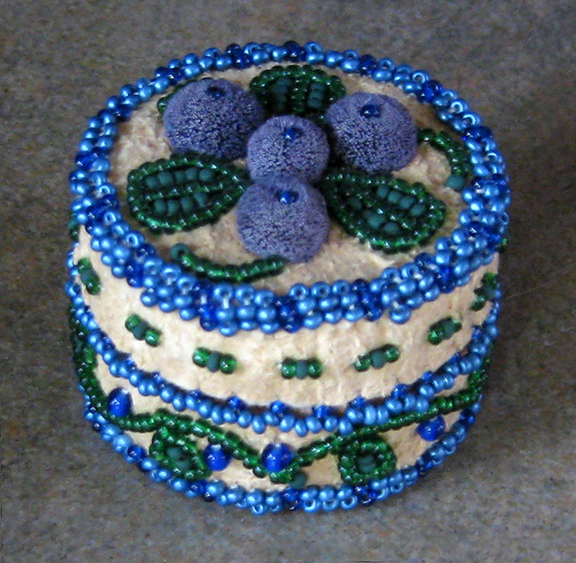
Moose hair tufting on an Athabaskan beaded hide box, Fairbanks, Alaska

Historically, "art" as a decorative concept did not traditionally exist among these indigenous people. Objects were utilitarian, although decorated in ways that conveyed images of spiritual or physical activity. It was not until Europeans and Asians first made contact with the indigenous people of coastal Alaska in the 17th century that such non-utilitarian art objects began to be traded in exchange for metal implements, cloth, and foodstuffs such as tea, flour, or sugar.

Many objects traded were valued for their functionality: clothing woven of grass, harpoon tips carved from the ivory tusk of the walrus; rainproof outerwear sewn from membranes in the intestines of seals; and animal skins valued for their warmth and durability. Gradually, these items were refined to be more decorative, as a way to increase their value in trade. For example, a walrus tusk might be etched with many hunting scenes depicting life of the coastal people; later, this technique would come to be known as "scrimshaw" when brought back to New England on whaling ships. Elaborate patterns in beadwork were designed as the beads themselves arrived through trade; regalia of all types used for ceremonial purposes – masks, woven clothing, hats, dance fans – all became souvenirs for the whalers and explorers of the 17th, 18th and 19th centuries. Even the towering totem poles from Southeastern Alaska found their way back to the East Coast of the United States, where they formed the basis of many museum collections.

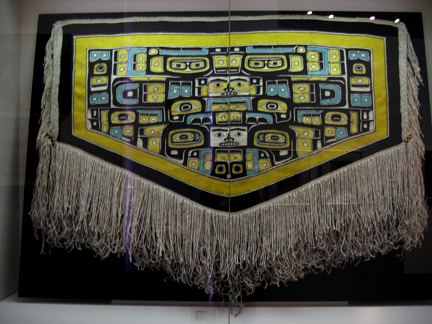
Chilkat blanket, collection of the University of Alaska Museum of the North

While the art forms were and still are as different as the cultures of the Native people who made them – Athabaskan Indians of the vast Interior, Inupiaq of the Northwestern Arctic coasts; Yupik and St. Lawrence Island Yupik of the Bering Sea coast; Aleuts and Alutiiq people from the Aleutian islands; and the Tlingit, Haida and Tsimshian Indians often known as Northwest Coastal tribes – they commonly evoke references to living in harmony with nature and all its many creatures. No part of an animal hunted, fished or trapped could be wasted, for example, so one might see boots or "mukluks" made of bearded seal skin for soles, salmon skin for the outer layer, and straps of caribou or deerskin, perhaps even dyed with berries. As Native people lived off the land and the sea, their relationships to a particular place could always be seen in their objects in both physical and metaphorical terms. As traditions evolved through more "westernization" with Russian America in the 17th century and Territorial Alaska beginning in 1867 and finally the creation of Alaska as our 49th State in 1959, so did their art forms.

All are continually evolving, blurring the distinction between what an art critic today might want to categorize as "traditional" versus "contemporary" Native art. In fact, contemporary, international art values have a place in Alaska Native art. Wall-size paintings, three-dimensional mobiles, life-size bronze castings and marble sculptures, to name just a few categories, fill galleries alongside bears carved from whalebones, cribbage boards honed from full-length walrus tusks, and fine jewelry etched of copper and silvers. There are also nephrite jade and musk ox horns polished into bracelets, bentwood boxes carved from coastal white cedar trees, and baskets of different intricate designs, woven from birch bark, spruce root, beach grasses, or even the baleen from a bowhead whale.

== Specific tribes and their art forms ==
The Inupiat tribes create useful tools such as bows, arrows, harpoons, float discs, snow beaters, boot sole creasers, skin scrapers, fat removers, spoons, handles, rope, belts and other clothing from materials they find locally. These materials include fish skin, caribou hide, polar bear fur, whale baleen (baleen basketry), old ivory and seal (all parts of each animal are normally used somehow for tool-making if not consumed). Masks were often made for ceremonial purposes, bringing the people, animals and spirits together in one being. Traditionally sculptures are not made for decoration, but as "good luck amulets" for hunting, or sometimes they are toys for small children. Objects are often colored with charcoal and then a layer of fish oil was also applied to assure it does not rub off. Although contemporary commercial paints are commonly used today. Mukluks (shoes) and parkas (jackets) were sewn by the women out of animal hides and were generally only elaborately decorated for ceremonies. This art form is called "skin-sewing."

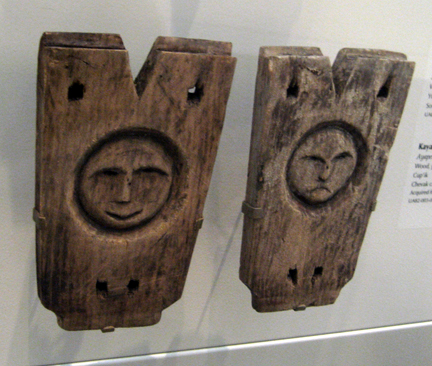
Cup'ik kayak stanchions, collection of the University of Alaska Museum of the North. The left is a male figure, while the right is female.

The Yup'ik tribes traditionally decorate most all of their tools, even ones that perform smaller functions. One of their most popular forms of art are masks, which are generally made of wood and range in size from a few inches tall to several pounds in weight. They most often create masks for ceremonies but the masks are traditionally destroyed after being used. These masks are used to bring the person wearing it luck and good fortune in hunts. Masks are the result of multiple persons efforts, sometimes created by one in mind but physically created by another

The Tlingit tribes' artwork is also frequently functional. Their artwork often consists of clothing and carvings, including canoes and totem poles, which are still well-recognized today. The tools generally used for carving are knives, traditionally made of shell, stone or bone, depending on the artist and what its purpose. The materials that are carved were bone of sheep or goat, and most often wood. Many types of wood are found in the southeastern panhandle of Alaska; some major species include cedar (both yellow and red) for totems and canoes, and finally, alder is used in making dishes and utensils for eating since that wood does not impart its taste onto food. Totem poles always tell a story, since the Tlingit culture traditional is an oral culture with minimal written history. Each animal on a totem pole represent family crests or tells a specific story.

== Today ==
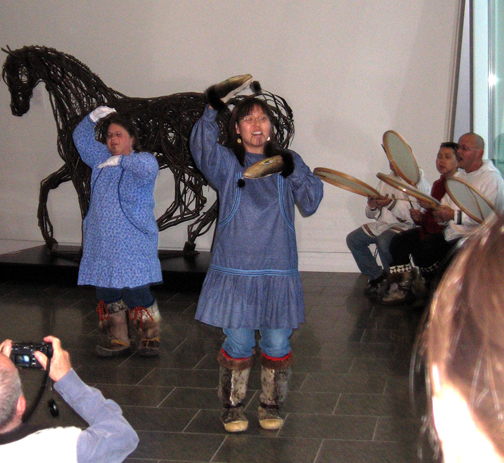
Alaska Native dance troupe with skirtled Kuskokwim style kuspuk at the University of Alaska Museum of the North

With the advent of the internet, all of these art forms can now be seen and appreciated from anywhere. The Alaska Native Arts Foundation, a non-profit organization, is dedicated to supporting Native artists and their subsistence lifestyles based on living in harmony with the environment. The University of Alaska, Fairbanks has a Native art program, created in 1965.

== See also ==
- Inuit art
- Native American art
- Native Art Center at the University of Alaska Fairbanks
- Northwest Coast art
- Chilkat weaving
- Potlatch
- Ravenstail weaving, yeil koowu
- Totem pole
- Yup'ik clothing
