= Northwest Coast art =

Art style associated with the indigenous peoples of the Pacific Northwest

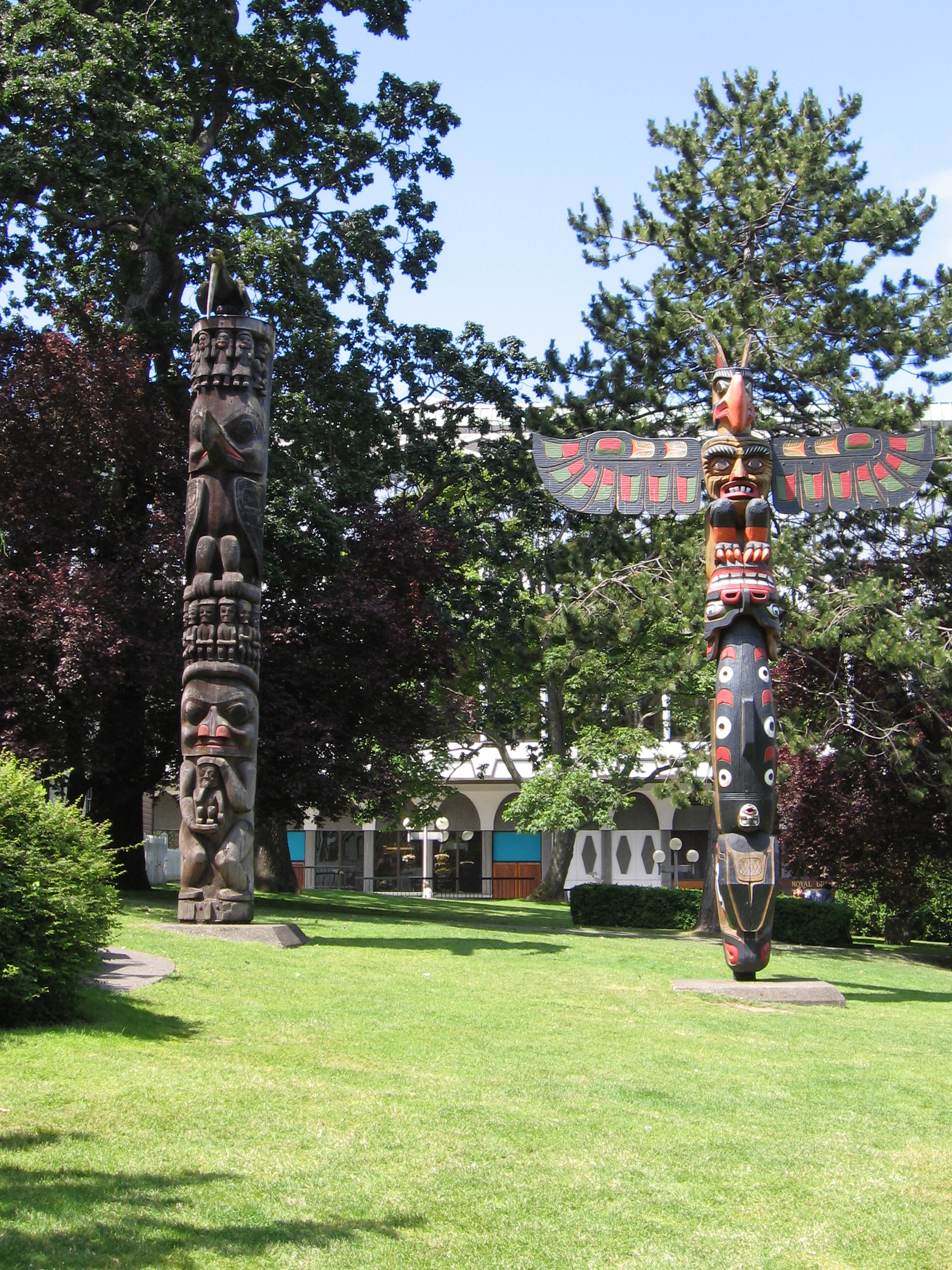
Totem poles, a type of Northwest Coast art

Northwest Coast art is the term commonly applied to a style of art created primarily by artists from Tlingit, Haida, Heiltsuk, Nuxalk, Tsimshian, Kwakwaka'wakw, Nuu-chah-nulth and other First Nations and Native American tribes of the Northwest Coast of North America, from pre-European-contact times up to the present.

== Distinguishing characteristics ==
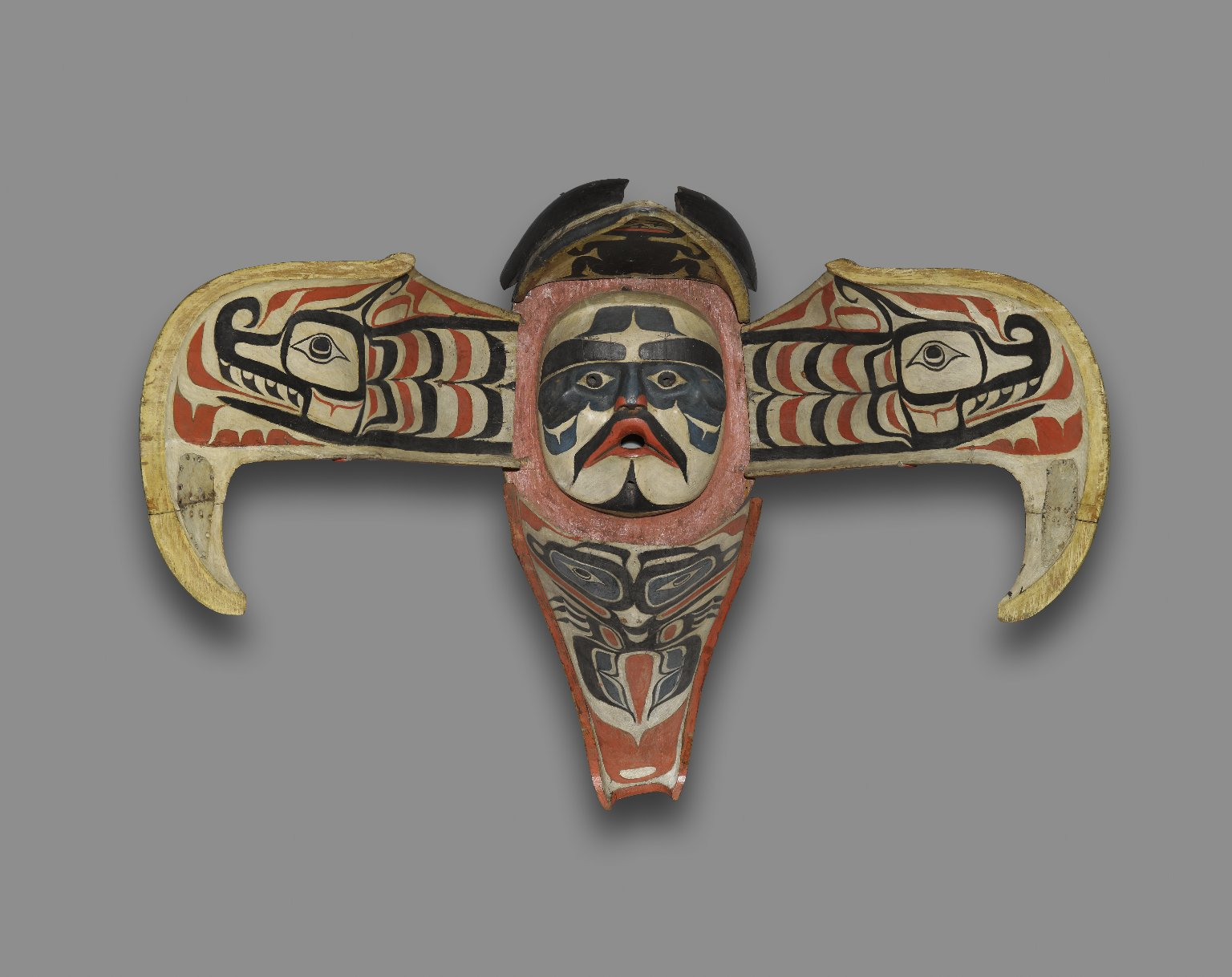
Namgis, Thunderbird Transformation Mask, 19th century. The Thunderbird is believed to be an Ancestral Sky Being of the ʼNamgis First Nation of the Kwakwaka'wakw, who say that when this bird ruffles its feathers, it causes thunder and when it blinks its eyes, lightning flashes. Brooklyn Museum

Two-dimensional Northwest Coast art is distinguished by the use of formlines, and the use of characteristic shapes referred to as ovoids, U forms and S forms. Before European contact, the most common media were wood (often Western red cedar), stone, and copper; since European contact, paper, canvas, glass, and precious metals have also been used. If paint is used, the most common colours are red and black, but yellow is also often used, particularly among Kwakwaka'wakw artists. Chilkat weaving applies formline designs to textiles. Tlingit, Haida, and Tsimshian have traditionally produced Chilkat woven regalia, from wool and yellow cedar bark, that is important for civic and ceremonial events, including potlatches.

The patterns depicted include natural forms such as bears, ravens, eagles, orcas, and humans; legendary creatures such as thunderbirds and sisiutls; and abstract forms made up of the characteristic Northwest Coast shapes. Totem poles are the most well-known artifacts produced using this style. Northwest Coast artists are also notable for producing characteristic "bent-corner" or "bentwood" boxes, masks, and canoes. Northwest Coast designs were also used to decorate traditional First Nations household items such as spoons, ladles, baskets, hats, and paddles; since European contact, the Northwest Coast art style has increasingly been used in gallery-oriented forms such as paintings, prints and sculptures.

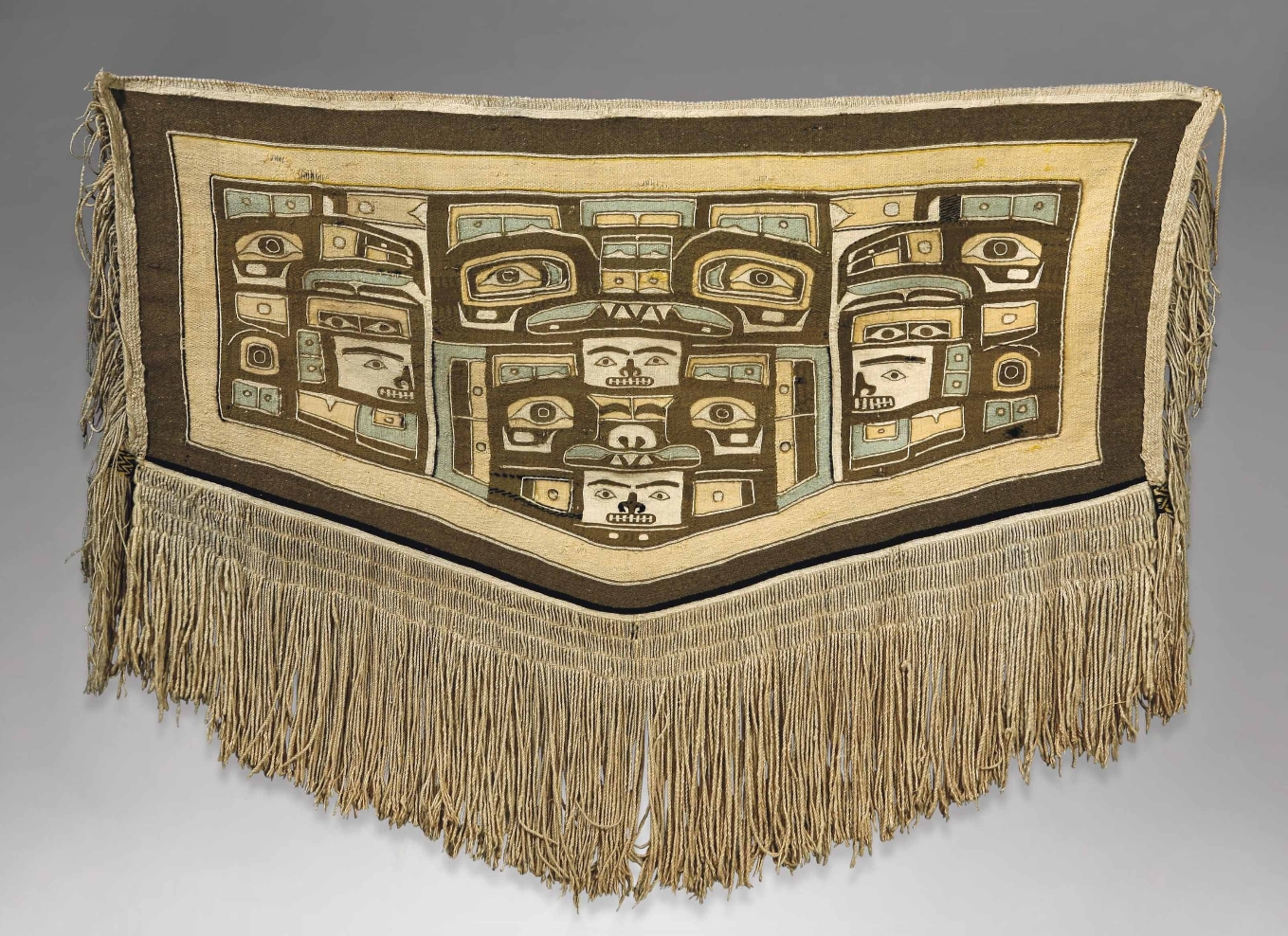
Mary Ebbets Hunt - Chilkat blanket

Although highly conventionalized decorative design occurs all along the coast, to the south and north of this center the representational motive becomes progressively stronger. Krickeberg (1925: 144) characterizes this as a fresh naturalism to the south among the Kwakiutl, Nootka, and Salish and a certain relationship to Eskimo engraving and painting among the Tlingit to the north. The shift in emphasis is gradual - Bella Bella art, for example, has a close affinity to its Coast Tsimshian counterpart. Two-dimensional art of all these groups, however, is much more closely related than is their sculpture, especially among the northern tribes of Tlingit, Haida, Tsimshian, and Bella Bella.

Textile arts from the Northwest Coast include Chilkat weaving, Raven's Tail Weavings, Button Blankets, and elaborate ceremonial regalia using a range of materials. Three dimension art was created from many materials, notably wood.

== History ==
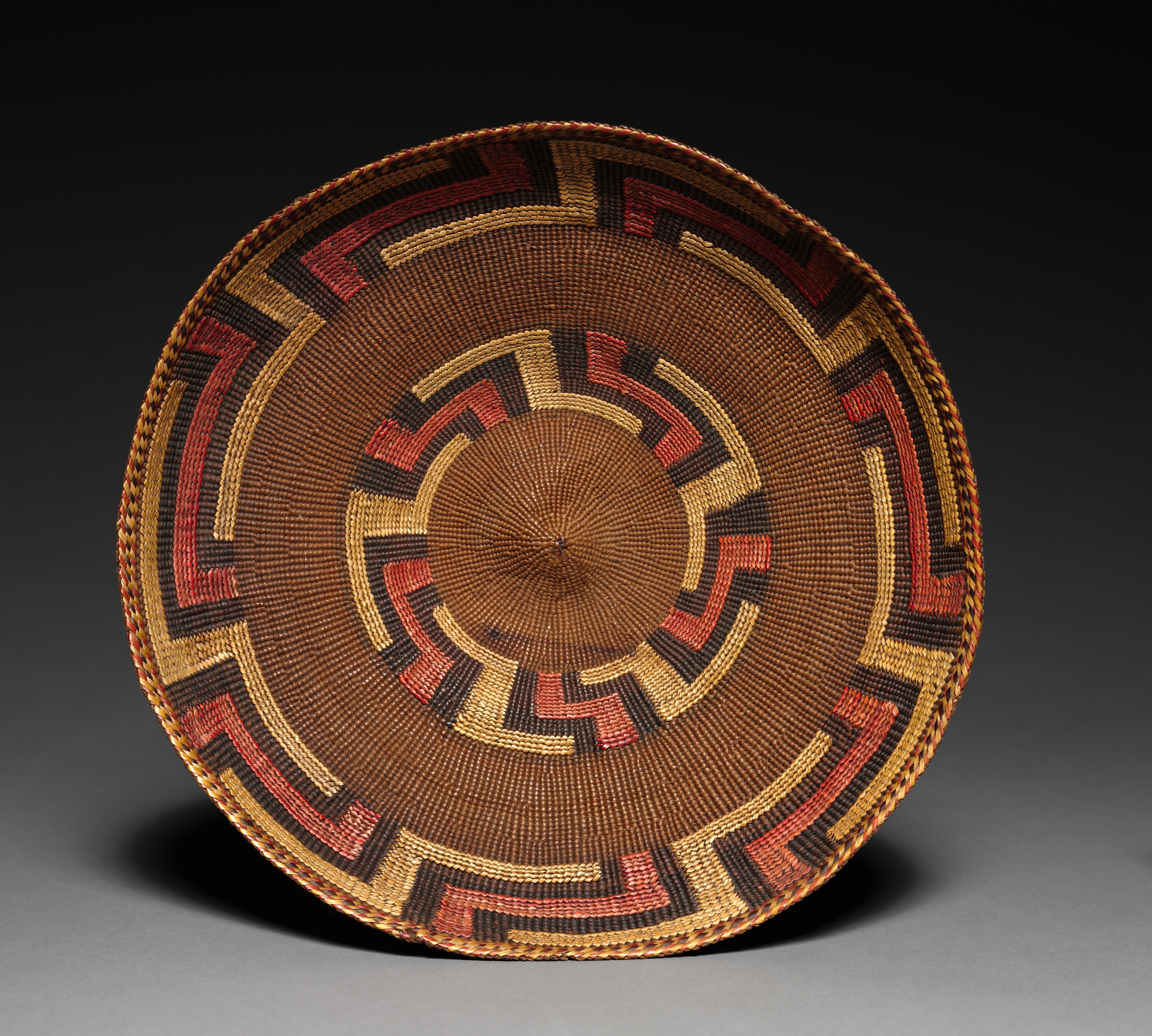
Tlingit twined basket tray, late 19th c., spruce root, American dunegrass, pigment, Cleveland Museum of Art

Prior to contact with Europeans, First Nations on the Northwest coast evolved complex social and ceremonial institutions, including the potlatch system, hereditary systems of rank and descent, ceremonial societies, and permanent villages. Social organization involved groups of kin, reckoned variously matrilineally, patrilineally or bi-lineally. These groups hold various tangible and intangible rights and properties. Among them are origin stories. Many instances of Northwest coast art are visual references to these stories.

After European contact, in the late 18th century, the peoples who produced Northwest Coast art suffered huge population losses due to diseases such as smallpox, and cultural losses due to colonization and assimilation into European-North American culture. The production of their art dropped drastically as well.

Toward the end of the 19th century, Northwest Coast artists began producing work for commercial sale, such as small argillite carvings. The end of the 19th century also saw large-scale export of totem poles, masks and other traditional art objects from the region to museums and private collectors around the world. Some of this export was accompanied by financial compensation to people who had a right to sell the art, and some was not.

In the early 20th century, very few First Nations artists in the Northwest Coast region were producing art. A tenuous link to older traditions remained in artists such as Charles Gladstone, Henry Speck, Ellen Neel, Stanley George, and Mungo Martin. The mid-20th century saw a revival of interest and production of Northwest Coast art, due to the influence of artists and academics such as Bill Reid (a grandson of Charles Gladstone) and Bill Holm and Duane Pasco (carver & teacher). A revival of traditional ceremonial ways also drove the increased production of traditional arts. This time also saw an increasing demand for the return of art objects that were illegally or immorally taken from First Nations communities. This demand continues to the present day. Today, there are numerous art schools teaching formal Northwest Coast art of various styles, and there is a growing market for new art in this style.

The revival of ceremonial life, following the lifting of the potlatch ban, has also driven production of traditional clothing, painting and carving for use in ceremonies.

== Cultural appropriateness ==
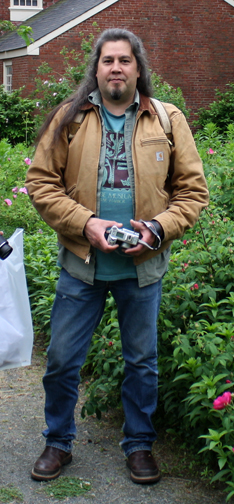
Tommy Joseph, Tlingit woodcarver and sculptor from Sitka, Alaska

Although neighbouring peoples such as the Coast Salish peoples also traditionally produced art which shares some characteristics of Northwest Coast art, these styles of art are not usually included in the term, since the patterns and artifacts produced are rather different. For example, Salish peoples traditionally created standing welcome figures not created by other Northwest Coast peoples, did not traditionally create totem poles, and did not traditionally use the form lines and shapes of other Northwest Coast peoples. One corollary of this fact is that — contrary to popular belief — other than some of the peoples of the Olympic Peninsula, no Native American nations of Washington and Oregon states produced totem poles and other characteristic, formline, Northwest Coast-style art objects before European contact.

Traditionally, within a given community, some patterns and motifs could be used only by certain families and lineages, or with the agreement of those families and lineages. Today, in British Columbia, it is a point of contention whether only First Nations artists of the appropriate nation have the moral right to produce art of given types and using given motifs, or whether only the intent of the person and the respect given to the respective peoples are significant. Some non-Native artists, such as John Livingston, have been adopted into First Nations and have thus formally acquired the right to produce such art. In some nations, such as the Haida, adoptions are seen by some only as gestures, and production of work in their trademark style by outsiders may, in some contexts, be viewed as economic and cultural appropriation.

== Notable artists ==
Notable Northwest Coast artists of the 19th century include- Albert Edward Edenshaw (Haida), Captain Carpenter (Heiltsuk), Willie Seaweed (Kwakwak'wakw), Charles Edenshaw, who is widely acknowledged as a master whose art is in all the great collections around the world.

Also Guujaaw, another notable carver and builder who is also Haida political leader. Other notable Northwest Coast artists of the 20th and 21st centuries include Charlie James, Henry Speck, Doug Cranmer, Stanley George, James Schoppert, Bill Reid, Mungo Martin, Ellen Neel, Robert Davidson, Beau Dick, Willie Seaweed, Roy Henry Vickers, Don Yeomans, Jay Simeon, Amos Wallace, Lyle Wilson, Sam (Sammy) Robinson, Ron Hamilton, Art Thompson, Joe David, Reginald Peterson, Freda Diesing, Lawrence Paul Yuxweluptun, Tony Hunt and Nathan Jackson (artist)

== Notable art historians and thinkers ==
Notable academics and publishers of northwest Northwest Coast include Hilary Stewart, Bill Holm, Bill Reid, Bill McLennan, Martha Black, and George F. MacDonald. Doreen Jensen and Polly Sargent's book Robes of Power (1986) deals with ceremonial robes - called Button blanket - and their history and forms. Cheryl Samuel and her book The Raven's Tail (1987) describes northern weaving style known as Raven's Tail - used to make ceremonial robes and other regalia.

Emily Carr, though she did not formally adopt the techniques, commonly used native art as the motif of many of her early paintings.

== See also ==
- Alaska Native art
- Button blanket
- Chilkat weaving
- Coast Salish art
- Formline art
- Haida argillite carvings
- Kwakwaka'wakw art
- Native American art
- Potlatch
- Totem pole
- Transformation mask
