= Formline art =

Feature of indigenous North American art

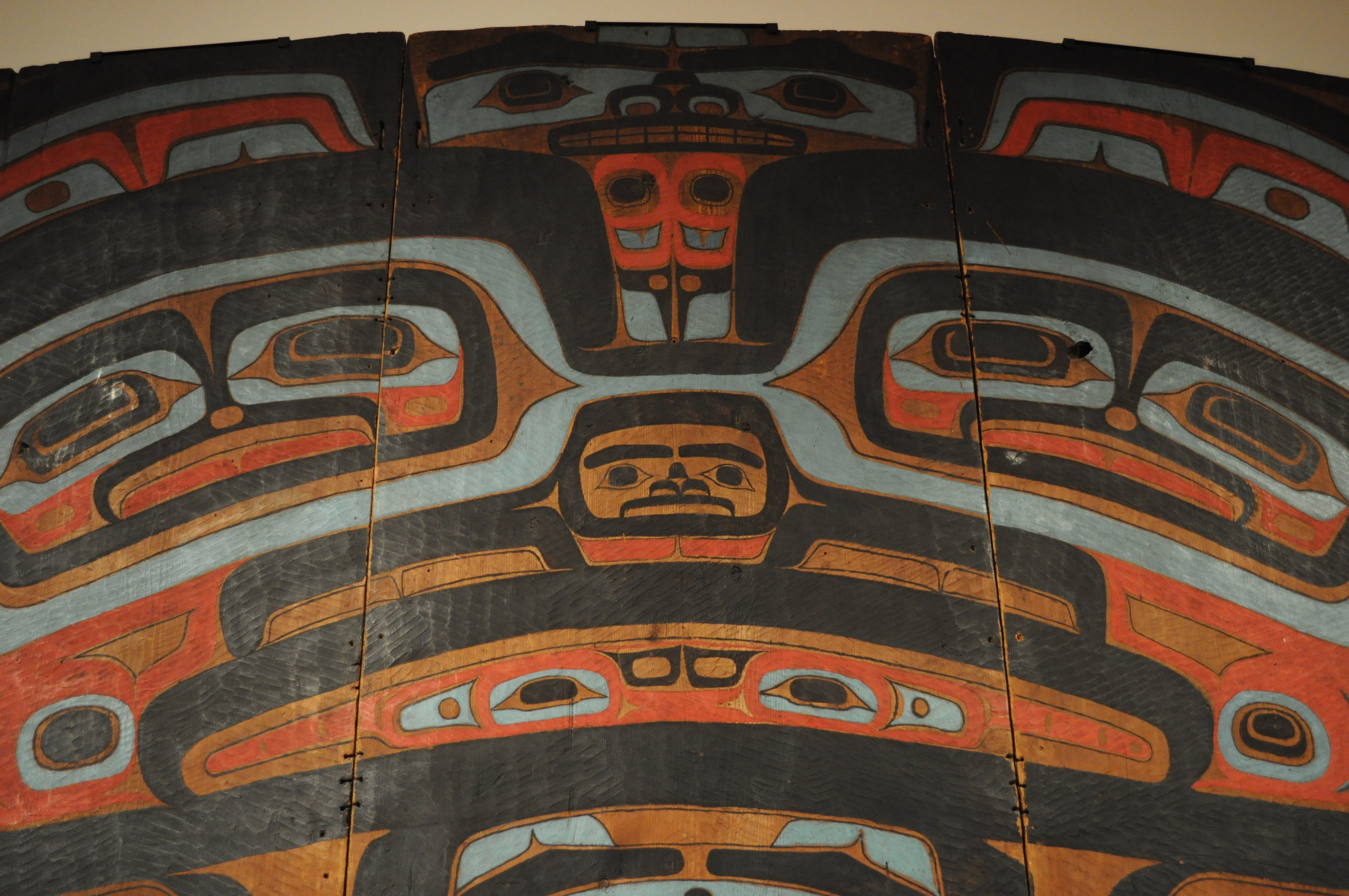
Yéil X̱ʼéen (Raven Screen) (detail). Attributed to Ḵaajisdu.áx̱ch, Tlingit, Kiks.ádi clan, active late 18th – early 19th century.

Formline art is a feature in the Indigenous art of the Northwest Coast of North America, distinguished by the use of characteristic shapes referred to as ovoids, U forms and S forms. Coined by Bill Holm in his 1965 book Northwest Coast Indian Art: An Analysis of Form, the "formline is the primary design element on which Northwest Coast art depends, and by the turn of the 20th century, its use spread to the southern regions as well. It is the positive delineating force of the painting, relief and engraving. Formlines are continuous, flowing, curvilinear lines that turn, swell and diminish in a prescribed manner. They are used for figure outlines, internal design elements, and abstract compositions."

== History ==
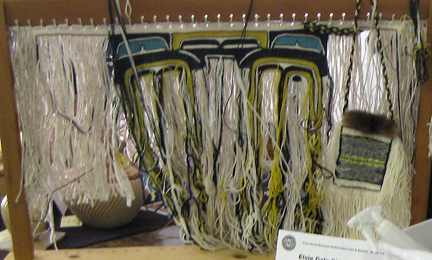
Chilkat weaving uses complex techniques to produce formlines

After European contact in the late 18th century, the peoples who produced Northwest Coast art suffered huge population losses due to diseases such as smallpox, and cultural losses due to forced assimilation into European-North American culture, Canadian colonial cultural suppression, and the confiscation or destruction of traditional art and artifacts of ritual and governance. The production of such art dropped drastically.

Toward the end of the 19th century, Northwest Coast artists began producing work for commercial sales, such as small argillite carvings produced by the Haida. The end of the 19th century also saw large-scale export of totem poles, masks and other traditional art objects from the region to museums and private collectors globally. Some of this export was accompanied by financial compensation to people who had a right to sell the art, and some was not.

In the early 20th century few First Nations artists in the Northwest Coast region produced art. A tenuous link to older traditions remained in artists such as Charles Gladstone (Haida), Stanley George (Heiltsuk) and Mungo Martin (Kwakwaka'wakw). The mid-20th century saw a revival of interest and production of Northwest Coast art, due to the influence of artists and critics such as Bill Reid, a grandson of Charles Gladstone, and others. Reid developed his understanding of Haida formline by studying ethnographic museum collections, and by making sculptures and serigraphs. In 1975, American anthropologist Edmund “Ted” Carpenter invited Reid and Holm to co-author Form and Freedom: A Dialogue on Northwest Coast Indian Art, a book documenting the pair's discussions about more than one hundred Northwest Coast art objects. The renewal of Haida art is part of a wider cultural and political awakening among First Nations. It also saw an increasing demand for the return of art objects (known as Repatriation) that were illegally or immorally taken from First Nations communities. This demand continues to the present day. Today, numerous art schools teach formal Northwest Coast art of various styles, and there is a growing market for new art in this style.

== See also ==
- Northwest Coast art
