= List of United States Artists Fellowship recipients =

This is a list of recipients of United States Artists (USA) Fellowship grants. The grant is issued annually by United States Artists (USA) a non-government philanthropic organization that supports living American artists.

== USA Fellows ==
=== 2006 ===
2006 United States Artists Fellowships
Category	Recipients
Architecture & Design	Antenna Design (Sigi Moeslinger and Masamichi Udagawa)
Crafts & Traditional Arts	Tanya Aguiniga, Liz Collins, Anna Brown Ehlers, Arline Fisch, Sarah Jaeger, Teri Rofkar
Dance	Ronald K. Brown, Eiko and Koma, Alonzo King, Ralph Lemon
Literature	Sandra Benitez, Beth Ann Fennelly, Amy Hempel, Victor LaValle, Heather McHugh, Wesley McNair, Susan Power, Joe Sacco, Matthew Stadler
Electronic Media & Media	Sterlin Harjo, Thomas Allen Harris, David Isay, George Kuchar and Mike Kuchar, Dmae Roberts, Philip Rodriguez
Music	John Luther Adams, Natividad Cano, Bill Frisell and Jim Woodring, Ali Akbar Khan, Lourdes Pérez
Theater Arts	Anne Bogart, Ping Chong, Anthony Garcia, Marc Bamuthi Joseph, Meredith Monk, Dominique Serrand, Basil Twist
Visual arts	Laylah Ali, Mark Bradford, Nick Cave, Sam Durant, Mark Handforth, Michael Joo, Michael Lesy, Catherine Opie, William Pope.L, Michael Queenland, Anna Sew Hoy, Chris Ware

=== 2007 ===
2007 United States Artists Fellowships
Category	Recipients
Architecture & Design	Aranda/Lasch (Benjamin Aranda and Christopher Lasch), Ball-Nogues Studio (Benjamin Ball and Gaston Nogues), Office dA (Mónica Ponce de León and Nader Tehrani)
Crafts & Traditional Arts	Tommy Joseph, Gwendolyn Magee, Maggie Orth, Virgil Ortiz, Susie Silook
Dance	Joanna Haigood, Anna Halprin, Rennie Harris, Bill T. Jones, Benjamin Millepied, Shen Wei
Literature	Marilyn Chin, Henri Cole, Charles D'Ambrosio, William Gay, John Haines, Mat Johnson, Cherríe Moraga, Luis Valdez, Helena Maria Viramontes
Media	Julie Dash, Chris Eyre, Judith Helfand, Alex Rivera, Susan Stone
Music	Don Byron, Michael Doucet, Leila Josefowicz, Jason Moran, John Santos, Evan Ziporyn
Theater	Pat Bowie, Rhodessa Jones, Tina Landau, Elizabeth LeCompte, Michael Sommers, Robert Woodruff
Visual Arts	Edgar Arceneaux, Uta Barth, Paul Chan, Charles Gaines, Ann Hamilton, Daniel Joseph Martinez, Marcos Ramirez ERRE, Allan Sekula, Gary Simmons, Zoe Strauss

=== 2008 ===
2008 United States Artists Fellowships
Category	Recipients
Architecture & Design	Julie Bargmann, Stephen Burks, Douglas Garafolo, J. Meejin Yoon, Andrew Zago
Crafts & Traditional Arts	Alvin Aningayou, Mary Jackson, Richard Notkin, Judith Schaechter
Dance	Ann Carlson, Joe Goode, Pat Graney, Dianne Walker, Jawole Willa Jo Zollar
Literature	Jeff Chang, Forrest Gander, Barry Hannah, Joy Harjo, Tayari Jones, A. Van Jordan, Laura Kasischke, le thi diem thuy, Harryette Mullen
Media	Cary Joji Fukunaga, William Greaves, Andrew Okpeaha MacLean, Lourdes Portillo, Jay Rosenblatt, Ela Troyano
Music	Muhal Richard Abrams, Robert Cazimero, Chris Jonas and Molly Sturges, Wu Man, Stephen Scott, Henry Threadgill
Theater Arts	Karen Kandel, Will Power, Bill Rauch, Rosalba Rolón, Jennifer Tipton
Visual Arts	Terry Adkins, Michael Asher, Andrea Bowers, Deanna Dikeman, Barkley L. Hendricks, Tehching Hsieh, Rodney McMillian, Martha Rosler, Catherine Sullivan, Kara Walker

=== 2009 ===
2009 United States Artists Fellowships
Category	Recipients
Architecture & Design	Neil Denari, Laura Kurgan, Rick Lowe, Kate and Laura Mulleavy
Crafts & Traditional Arts	Perry Eaton, Delores Lewis Garcia and Emma Lewis Mitchell, Beth Lo, Dona Look, Mary Shaffer, Kukuli Velarde
Dance	Sophiline Cheam Shapiro, Lin Hixson and Matthew Goulish, Hokulani Holt-Padilla, Tere O'Connor, Reggie Wilson
Literature	Ai, Nilo Cruz, Gilbert Hernandez, Antonya Nelson, Sapphire, Justin Torres, Brian Turner, Kevin Young
Media	Cruz Angeles, Charles Burnett, Scott Carrier, Heather Courtney, Elizabeth Meister and Dan Collison, Renee Tajima-Peña
Music	Rahim AlHaj, Cyro Baptista, Ella Jenkins, Danongan Kalanduyan, Hannibal Lokumbe, Lionel Loueke, Daniel Plonsey
Theater Arts	Dan Hurlin, Ruth Maleczech, John O'Neal, Anna Deavere Smith
Visual Arts	Diana al-Hadid, Terry Allen, Vija Celmins, Anthony Hernandez, Joan Jonas, Kim Jones, Martin Mazorra and Michael Houston, Dave McKenzie, Judy Pfaff, Dario Robleto

=== 2010 ===
2010 United States Artists Fellowships
Category	Recipients
Architecture & Design	Teddy Cruz, Greg Lynn, David Reinfurt
Crafts & Traditional Arts	Jeremy Frey, Matthias Pliessnig, Joyce Scott, Michael Sherrill, W. A. Ehren Tool, Jennifer Heller Zurick
Dance	Miguel Gutierrez, Dayna Hanson, Deborah Hay, Trey McIntyre, Bebe Miller, Awilda Sterling-Duprey
Literature	Charles Bowden, Martín Espada, Khaled Mattawa, Brighde Mullins, Susan Steinberg, Greg Tate, Doug Wright
Media	Natalia Almada, Ramin Bahrani, Almudena Carracedo, Cherian Dabis, Barrett Golding, Anne Lewis, Tina Mabry, Laura Poitras
Music	Uri Caine, Gabriela Lena Frank, Rob Ickes, Guy Klucevsek
Theater Arts	Julie Archer, Pig Iron Theatre Company (Gabriel Quinn Bauriedel, Dan Rothenberg, and Dito van Reigersberg), Carlyle Brown, Danny Hoch, Quiara Alegría Hudes, Rajiv Joseph, Gerard Stropnicky
Visual Arts	Siah Armajani, Dara Birnbaum, Mel Chin, Renée Green, Glenn Ligon, Mary Lucier, Allison Smith, Anna Von Mertens, Doug Wheeler

=== 2011 ===
2011 United States Artists Fellowships
Category	Recipients
Architecture & Design	Elena Manferdini, J. Morgan Puett, Jenny E. Sabin, Ada Tolla and Giuseppe Lignano, Mabel O. Wilson
Crafts & Traditional Arts	Sonya Clark, Tom Joyce, Beth Lipman, Jon Eric Riis, Akio Takamori, Aaron Yakim
Dance	Donald Byrd, Nora Chipaumire, Michelle Ellsworth, John Jasperse, Liz Lerman, Lar Lubovitch, Morgan Thorson
Literature	Annie Baker, Terrance Hayes, Campbell McGrath, A. E. Stallings, Karen Tei Yamashita
Media	Tze Chun, Steve James, John Jota Leaños, James Longley, Kara Oehler and Ann Heppermann, Dee Rees, Kelly Reichardt
Music	Manuel Barrueco, Mary Ellen Childs, Lila Downs, George E. Lewis, Sean Shepherd, Sxip Shirey, Holcombe Waller
Theater Arts	Lee Breuer, John Collins, Teresa Hernandez, Nancy Keystone, Kirk Lynn, Octavio Solis
Visual Arts	Iñigo Manglano-Ovalle, Lorraine O'Grady, John Outterbridge, Allen Ruppersberg, Carolee Schneemann, Roger Shimomura, Mike Smith

=== 2012 ===
Actor Tim Robbins presented the 2012 awards a celebration held at the Los Angeles Getty Center.

2012 United States Artists Fellowships
Category	Recipients
Architecture & Design	Stephen Luoni, Kate Orff, Jesse Reiser and Nanako Umemoto, Marcelo Spina and Georgina Huljich
Crafts & Traditional Arts	Nicholas Galanin, Myra Mimlitsch-Gray, Leon Niehues, Sibylle Peretti, Rowland Ricketts, Kurt Weiser
Dance	Kyle Abraham, Trisha Brown, Keith Hennessy, Ranee Ramaswamy, David Thomson
Literature	Adrian Castro, Aleksandar Hemon, LeAnne Howe, Micheline Aharonian Marcom, C.E. Morgan, Annie Proulx
Media	Rania Attieh and Daniel Garcia, Margaret Brown, Lee Isaac Chung, Jacqueline Goss, Barry Jenkins, Phil Solomon, Nick van der Kolk
Music	Jack DeJohnette, Colin Jacobsen and Eric Jacobsen, Claire Lynch, Joanie Madden, Eugene Rodriguez, Tony Trishcka, Edward White
Theater Arts	Marcus Gardley, Guillermo Gómez-Peña, David Henry Hwang, John Kelly, Adrienne Kennedy, Robbie McCauley, Annie-B Parson
Visual Arts	Luis Camnitzer, Coco Fusco, Theaster Gates, David Hartt, Edgar Heap of Birds, William Leavitt, Alison Saar, Kerry Tribe

=== 2013 ===
No fellowship grants awards were given in 2013.

=== 2014 ===
2014 United States Artists Fellowships
Category	Recipients
Architecture & Design	Marlon Blackwell, Doris Sung
Crafts & Traditional Arts	Marcus Amerman, Einar de la Torre and Jamex de la Torre, Darryl Montana, Tip Toland
Dance	Alejandro Cerrudo, d. Sabela Grimes, RoseAnne Spradlin
Literature	Chris Abani, Peter Bagge, Natalie Diaz, Rigoberto González, Achy Obejas, Daniel Woodrell
Media	Sydney Freeland, Ken Jacobs, Yowei Shaw, Ryan White and Ben Cotner
Music	Alison Brown, Daoud Haroon, Meshell Ndegeocello
Theater	Kia Corthron, Sigrid Gilmer, Sibyl Kempson
Visual Arts	Willie Birch, Sandow Birk, Edouard Duval Carrié, LaToya Ruby Frazier, Mary Heilmann, Leslie Hewitt, Wangechi Mutu

=== 2015 ===
2015 United States Artists Fellowships
Category	Recipients
Architecture & Design	Jonathan Muecke, Chat Travieso
Crafts	Cristina Córdova, Mark Hewitt, Ayumi Horie, Amos Paul Kennedy, Jr., Therman Statom, Anne Wilson
Dance	Jonah Bokaer, Camille A. Brown, Toni Pierce-Sands and Uri Sands
Literature	Teju Cole, Adrian Matejka
Media	Peter Nicks, Deborah Stratman
Music	Maya Beiser, David Lang, Rudresh Mahanthappa, Joe Louis Walker, Invincible ill Weaver, Shara Worden, Jasiri X
Theater & Performance	Jackie Sibblies Drury, Narcissister
Traditional Arts	Shan Goshorn, Kathleen Carlo-Kendall, Da-ka-xeen Mehner, Diego Romero, Sidonka Wadina, Mary Louise Defender Wilson
Visual Arts	Judith Baca, Frank Big Bear, Dawoud Bey, Paul Pfeiffer, Mickalene Thomas, Kade Twist

=== 2016 ===
2016 United States Artists Fellowships
Category	Recipients
Architecture & Design	Janet Echelman, Johnston Marklee (Sharon Johnston and Mark Lee)
Crafts	Vivian Beer, Lauren Fensterstock, Anna Hepler, Roberto Lugo, Annabeth Rosen, Piper Shepard, April Surgent
Dance	Michelle Dorrance, Faye Driscoll, Donna Uchizono, Rosie Herrera, Steve Paxton, Yvonne Rainer, Raphael Xavier
Literature	Amitava Kumar, Claudia Rankine
Media	Steven Paul Judd, Lynn Hershman Leeson, Quique Rivera Rivera
Music	Raven Chacon, Vijay Iyer, eddy kwon, Mike Reed, Dianne Reeves, Randy Weston
Theater & Performance	Daniel Alexander Jones, Miranda July, Hirokazu Kosaka, Young Jean Lee, Jefferson Pinder, Peggy Shaw
Traditional Arts	Teri Greeves, Cherice Harrison-Nelson, Ernie Marsh, Vicky Holt Takamine
Visual Arts	Charles Atlas, Senga Nengudi, Shirin Neshat, Winfred Rembert, Laurie Jo Reynolds, Beatriz Santiago Muñoz, Jacolby Satterwhite, Stanley Whitney

=== 2017 ===
No fellowship grants awards were given in 2017.

=== 2018 ===
2018 United States Artists Fellowships
Category	Recipients
Architecture & Design	Norman Kelley (Carrie Norman, Thomas Kelley), Amanda Williams
Craft	Julia Galloway, Tony Marsh, Martinez Studio (Wence Martinez, Sandra Martinez), Warren Newton Seelig, Patti Warashina
Dance	Oguri, Okwui Okpokwasili, Allison Orr, Bill Shannon, Amara Tabor-Smith
Media	Starlee Kine, Terence Nance, Elaine McMillion Sheldon, TNEG (Elissa Blount Moorhead, Arthur Jafa, Malik Sayeed)
Music	Terence Blanchard, Amir ElSaffar, Ruthie Foster, Tania León, Danilo Pérez, Toshi Reagon, Wayne Shorter, Somi, Tyshawn Sorey
Theater & Performance	Luis Alfaro, Lileana Blain-Cruz, Las Nietas de Nonó (Lydela Nonó, Michel Nonó), Tarell Alvin McCraney, My Barbarian (Malik Gaines, Jade Gordon, Alexandro Segade), Mary Kathryn Nagle
Traditional Arts	D.Y. Begay, Sonya Kelliher-Combs, Dawn Nichols Walden
Visual Art	Cassils, Abigail DeVille, Vanessa German, Pepón Osorio, Ebony G. Patterson, Dread Scott, Cauleen Smith
Writing	Molly McCully Brown, Lucas Mann, Fred Moten, Susan Muaddi Darraj

=== 2019 ===
2019 United States Artists Fellowships
Category	Recipients
Architecture & Design	Erin Besler and Ian Besler, Lucia Cuba, Keller Easterling
Craft	Coulter Fussell, Samuel Harvey, Michelle Holzapfel, Janice Lessman-Moss, Carole Frances Lung
Dance	David Dorfman, Lenora Lee, Alice Sheppard, Merián Soto, Yara Travieso
Film	Nuotama Frances Bodomo, Ramona S. Diaz, Julia Reichert and Steven Bognar
Media	Hyphen-Labs, Mitra Kaboli
Music	Reena Esmail, Helado Negro, Susie Ibarra, Roscoe Mitchell, Tunde Olaniran, Jen Shyu
Theater & Performance	Charlotte Brathwaite, Rashida Bumbray, Teo Castellanos, Complex Movements (Wes Taylor, Sage Crump, Carlos "L05" Garcia, ill Weaver), Frances Ya-Chu Cowhig, Kaneza Schaal
Traditional Arts	Juan Dies, Gabriel Frey, Arthur López, Allison Akootchook Warden
Visual Art	Firelei Báez, Juliana Huxtable, Simone Leigh, Wu Tsang, Cecilia Vicuña, Dyani White Hawk
Writing	Lesley Nneka Arimah, Lisa Armstrong, Lynda Barry, Tarfia Faizullah, Rebecca Gayle Howell

=== 2020 ===
2020 United States Artists Fellowships
Category	Recipients
Architecture & Design	MOS (Michael Meredith and Hilary Sample), Slow and Steady Wins the Race by Mary Ping, Sara Zewde
Craft	Jennifer Ling Datchuk, Del Harrow, Wendy Maruyama, Aaron McIntosh, Linda Sikora
Dance	Dianne McIntyre, Lisa Nelson, Will Rawls, Elizabeth Streb, Abby Zbikowski
Film	Sophia Nahli Allison, Bing Liu, RaMell Ross
Media	Yasmin Elayat, Surya Mattu, Guadalupe Rosales
Music	Anthony Braxton, Courtney Bryan, Sylvie Courvoisier, Nathalie Joachim, Nicole Mitchell, Pamela Z
Theater & Performance	Christina Anderson, Jorge Ignacio Cortiñas, Branden Jacobs-Jenkins, Hamid Rahmanian, Clint Ramos, Laurie Woolery
Traditional Arts	Tatsu Aoki, Delores Churchill, Dom Flemons "The American Songster," Lani Strong Hotch, Kevin Locke
Visual Art	Patty Chang, Melvin Edwards, Matthew Angelo Harrison, Howardena Pindell, Cameron Rowland, Jaune Quick-to-See Smith, Martine Syms, Nari Ward
Writing	Hanif Abdurraqib, Sarah Broom, Jericho Brown, Edwidge Danticat, Sharon Olds, Crystal Wilkinson

=== 2021 ===
2021 United States Artists Fellowships
Category	Recipients
Architecture & Design	Jennifer Bonner / MALL, Walter Hood, Olalekan Jeyifous
Craft	Diedrick Brackens, Bisa Butler, Amber Cowan, Salvador Jiménez-Flores, Cannupa Hanska Luger, Tiff Massey, Erin M. Riley
Dance	Ishmael Houston-Jones, JanpiStar, Emily Johnson, Cynthia Oliver, Ni’Ja Whitson
Film	Faren Humes, Macha Colón, Stephen Maing, Darius Clark Monroe, Naima Ramos-Chapman, Jennifer Reeder
Media	Morehshin Allahyari, Stephanie Dinkins, Lauren Lee McCarthy, Mother Cyborg
Music	Martha Gonzalez, Edward “Kidd” Jordan, Tomeka Reid, Wadada Leo Smith, Mazz Swift
Theater & Performance	Jibz Cameron, Carmelita Tropicana, Christopher Chen, Sandra Delgado, Idris Goodwin, Mia Katigbak, Karen Zacarías
Traditional Arts	Ofelia Esparza, Nathan P. Jackson, Basil Kincaid, Kawika Lum-Nelmida, Carolyn L. Mazloomi, Geo Soctomah Neptune, Delina White
Visual Art	Njideka Akunyili Crosby, Lex Brown, rafa esparza, Maria Gaspar, Sharon Hayes, Carolyn Lazard, Daniel Lind-Ramos, Aki Sasamoto
Writing	Alexander Chee, Eve L. Ewing, Honorée Fanonne Jeffers, Dunya Mikhail, Elizabeth McCracken, Natalie Y. Moore, Danez Smith, Ocean Vuong

=== 2022 ===
2022 United States Artists Fellowships
Category	Recipients
Architecture & Design	Germane Barnes, Nina Cooke John, Design Earth, Dream The Combine (Jennifer Newsom and Tom Carruthers), SO – IL (Jing Liu and Florian Idenburg)
Craft	Indira Allegra, Sharif Bey, Melissa Cody, Alison Croney Moses, Jovencio de la Paz, Sharif Farrag, Jordan Nassar
Dance	luciana achugar, T. Ayo Alston, Jenn Freeman | Po’Chop, Rosy Simas, Pramila Vasudevan, Viveca Vázquez, Netta Yerushalmy, Wondertwins
Film	Assia Boundaoui, Elegance Bratton, Ekwa Msangi, Diane Paragas, Keisha Rae Witherspoon
Media	American Artist, Salome Asega, Critical Design Lab, Andy Slater
Music	JJJJJerome Ellis, Kenny Endo, Jin Hi Kim, Laura Ortman, Jeff Parker, Qacung, Martha Redbone, Craig Taborn
Theater & Performance	Nataki Garrett, Marga Gomez, Lars America Jan, Machine Dazzle, DeLanna Studi
Traditional Arts	César Castro, Peggie L Hartwell, Karen Ann Hoffman, Las Imaginistas, Brett Ratliff, Marty Two Bulls Jr., Peter Williams
Visual Art	Andrea Carlson, Robert Andy Coombs, Jorge González Santos, Lonnie Holley, Nicole Marroquin, Olu Oguibe, Jordan Weber, Peter Williams
Writing	Chen Chen, Kiese Laymon, Dawn Lundy Martin, Leroy F. Moore Jr., Emmy Pérez, Grace Talusan

=== 2023 ===
2023 United States Artists Fellowships
Category	Recipients
Architecture & Design	Alexis Hope, Bryan C. Lee Jr, Krystal C. Mack, Deanna Van Buren
Craft	Ashwini Bhat, Syd Carpenter, Hong Hong, Bukola Koiki, Winnie Owens-Hart, Luis Alvaro Sahagun Nuño
Dance	Ayodele Casel, devynn emory, Antoine Hunter, Ayako Kato, Noemí Segarra Ramírez
Film	M.G. Evangelista, Jason Fitzroy Jeffers, Grace Lee, Loira Limbal, Angelo Madsen Minax
Media	Kite, Rasheedah Phillips, Angela Washko
Music	Arooj Aftab, Eduardo Alegría, Abdu Ali, Jlin
Theater & Performance	Sharon Bridgforth, Eisa Davis, Leslie Ishii, Kattorris Bang! (Nathalie Nia Faulk and indee mitchell), Cristal Chanelle Truscott
Traditional Arts	Brenton Jordan, Marques Hanalei Marzan, Barbara Teller Ornelas, Roquin-Jon Quichocho Siongco
Visual Art	Natalie Ball, Carolina Caycedo, Christine Sun Kim, Guadalupe Maravilla, Thaddeus Mosley
Writing	Ernestine Shaankaláxt’ Hayes, Ilya Kaminsky, Alex Marzano-Lesnevich, Ofelia Zepeda

=== 2024 ===
2024 United States Artists Fellowships
Category	Recipients
Architecture & Design	Ifeoma Ebo, Selina Martinez, Maya Bird-Murphy, DK Osseo-Asare, AD–WO (Emanuel Admassu and Jen Wood)
Craft	Linda Nguyen Lopez, John Paul Morabito, Tanya Crane, Helen Lee, Kira Dominguez Hultgren, Tammie Rubin
Dance	Mythili Prakash, Sean Dorsey, Jerron Herman, Petra Bravo, Marjani Forté-Saunders/7NMS, Erin Kilmurray
Film	Ciara Leina`ala Lacy, PJ Raval, Blackhorse Lowe, Garrett Bradley
Media	Cristóbal Martinez, Yo-Yo Lin, Mimi Ọnụọha
Music	Sarah Hennies, Samora Pinderhughes, Val Jeanty aka Val-Inc, Holland Andrews, Jerod Impichcha̱ achaaha’ Tate
Theater & Performance	Muriel Miguel, Philip Kan Gotanda, Kholoud Sawaf, Diana Oh “Zaza D”
Traditional Arts	Karen Collins, Kelly Church, Sgwaayaans TJ Young, Corey Alston, Michael Winograd
Visual Art	Sofía Gallisá Muriente, Trisha Baga, EJ Hill, Fronterizx Collective (Gabriela Muñoz and M. Jenea Sanchez), New Red Order (Adam Khalil, Jackson Polys, and Zack Khalil), María Magdalena Campos-Pons
Writing	Dantiel W. Moniz, Nafissa Thompson-Spires, Farid Matuk, Jeffery U. Darensbourg, Monica Ong, Danielle Evans

=== 2025 ===
2025 United States Artists Fellowships
Category	Recipients
Architecture & Design	Borderless Studio (Paola Aguirre Serrano and Dennis Milam), Finnegan Shannon, Jerome W Haferd, Leah Wulfman
Craft	Anjali Srinivasan, Aspen Golann, David Harper Clemons, Jocelyne Prince, Tzu-Ju Chen
Dance	Anna Martine Whitehead, Aysha Upchurch, Makini, Nami Yamamoto, Nichole Canuso, Trajal Harrell
Film	Christopher Harris, Ephraim Asili, kekahi wahi (Sancia Miala Shiba Nash and Drew K. Broderick), Rea Tajiri, Rodrigo Reyes
Media	Myles de Bastion, Rashaad Newsome, Sarah Rosalena, X
Music	Angel Bat Dawid, Leilehua Lanzilotti, Liz Phillips, Miya Masaoka, Tall Paul
Theater & Performance	dots (Andrew Moerdyk, Kimie Nishikawa, and Santiago Orjuela-Laverde), Geoff Sobelle, Rhiana Yazzie, Rudi Goblen, Shayok Misha Chowdhury
Traditional Arts	Cesar Viveros, Dalani Tanahy, Theresa Secord
Visual Art	Caroline Kent, Gala Porras-Kim, Kahlil Robert Irving, Karyn Olivier, Sadie Barnette, Sherrill Roland
Writing	Aimee Nezhukumatathil, Angie Cruz, Bojan Louis, Deesha Philyaw, Joan Naviyuk Kane, Matthew Salesses, Raquel Gutiérrez

=== 2026 ===
2026 United States Artists Fellowships
Category	Recipients
Architecture & Design	Curry J. Hackett, Margaret Roach Wheeler, Rosten Woo
Craft	Anina Major, Anthony Sonnenberg, Corey Pemberton, Norwood Viviano, Robell Awake, Xenobia Bailey
Dance	Jason Samuels Smith, Mame Diarra Speis-Biaye, Parul Shah, Shamel Pitts, Thaddeus Davis & Tanya Wideman-Davis (Wideman Davis Dance)
Film	Fawzia Mirza, Jules Rosskam, Monica Sorelle, Raven Jackson, Set Hernandez
Media	Anjali Kamat, Chenjerai Kumanyika, Mendi Obadike & Keith Obadike, Nancy Baker Cahill, Nat Decker, Nathan Young
Music	Ben LaMar Gay, Sharon Udoh, inti figgis-vizueta, Layale Chaker, Terri Lyne Carrington
Theater & Performance	Jeanette Oi-Suk Yew, Mei Ann Teo, Mina Morita, Tanya Orellana, Ty Defoe
Traditional Arts	Aristotle Jones, Lily Hope, Sheila Kay Adams, Willi Carlisle
Visual Art	Edra Soto, Eric-Paul Riege, Macon Reed, Maia Chao, Mercedes Dorame, Raheleh Filsoofi
Writing	Johanna Hedva, LaTasha N. Nevada Diggs, Lauren Rebecca Weinstein, Mayukh Sen, Sarah Aziza
