= Anina Major =

Bahamian visual artist, ceramicist

- Artist Anina Major sits next to one of her large-scale sculptures in her studio.
- Born: 1981 (age 44–45); Nassau, Bahamas
- Education: Rhode Island School of Design (MFA, 2017)
- Occupations: Ceramicist, educator, visual artist
- Awards: 2026 United States Artists Fellowship
- Website: aninamajor.com

Anina Major (born 1981, Nassau, Bahamas) is a Caribbean contemporary artist working primarily in ceramics. She was born in the Bahamas and lives and works between Upstate New York and New York City. Her work often touches on themes of postcolonialism, the transatlantic world, Caribbean aesthetics, and one's relationship to land. Major is a professor of ceramics at Bennington College, Vermont.

== Early life and education ==
Anina Major was born in the Caribbean nation of the Bahamas. She grew up among the cultural traditions of weaving with natural fibers and learned from her grandmother the practice of Bahamian straw plaiting. Major received her Master of Fine Arts degree in 2017 from the Rhode Island School of Design (RISD) in Providence.

== Work ==
Anina Major's work is distinguished by the artist's craft technique of weaving on clay, which draws on West African designs and style. Her ceramic work comments on issues of migration, identity, and geopolitics through crafts, particularly ceramics. Anina Major is a faculty member at Bennington College, Vermont, where she teaches ceramics.

Her is included in the long-duration display at the National Museum of African American History and Culture in Washington DC. In 2025, Anina Major was a finalist of the Loewe Foundation Craft Prize. Major's work has been featured in the New York Times and Forbes Magazine.

== Collections ==
Major's work is included in the permanent collections of several global collecting institutions including the Pérez Art Museum Miami, Florida; the Museum of Fine Arts, Boston, Massachusetts; Carnegie Museum of Art, Pennsylvania; Los Angeles County Museum of Art, California; National Gallery of the Bahamas; Nassau; Rhode Island School of Design Museum (RISD Museum); Rhode Island, National Museum of African American History and Culture, Washington DC; Fuller Craft Museum, Massachusetts; York Art Gallery, England; and the Detroit Institute of Arts, Michigan.

=== Publications ===
- Le Feuvre, Lisa. (2024) "Great Women Sculptors." London New York, NY: Phaidon. ISBN 978-1-83866-777-1.

== Awards ==
In 2026, Anina Major was a recipient of the acclaimed United States Artists Fellowship. Major was awarded a 50,000 dollars cash prize alongside other six fellow artists Edra Soto, Maia Chao, Mercedes Dorame, Macon Reed, Eric-Paul Riege, Raheleh Filsoofi. She received The Armory Show Pomery Prize in 2024 for her installation "The Landing;" and a Joan Mitchell Foundation Fellowship in 2023.

== Notable works in public collections ==
- Water Towers (2024), Pérez Art Museum Miami, Florida
- Pillar (2023), Detroit Institute of Arts, Michigan
- Plait No. 00205042021 (2021), Fuller Craft Museum, Brockton, Massachusetts
- Hybrid No. 00305152021 (2021), National Museum of African American History and Culture, Washington DC
- Hybrid, Collapsed (2020), National Museum of African American History and Culture, Washington DC
- Hybrid No. 00105042021 (2021), RISD Museum, Rhode Island
