= Cooke-Sasseville =

Canadian artist collective

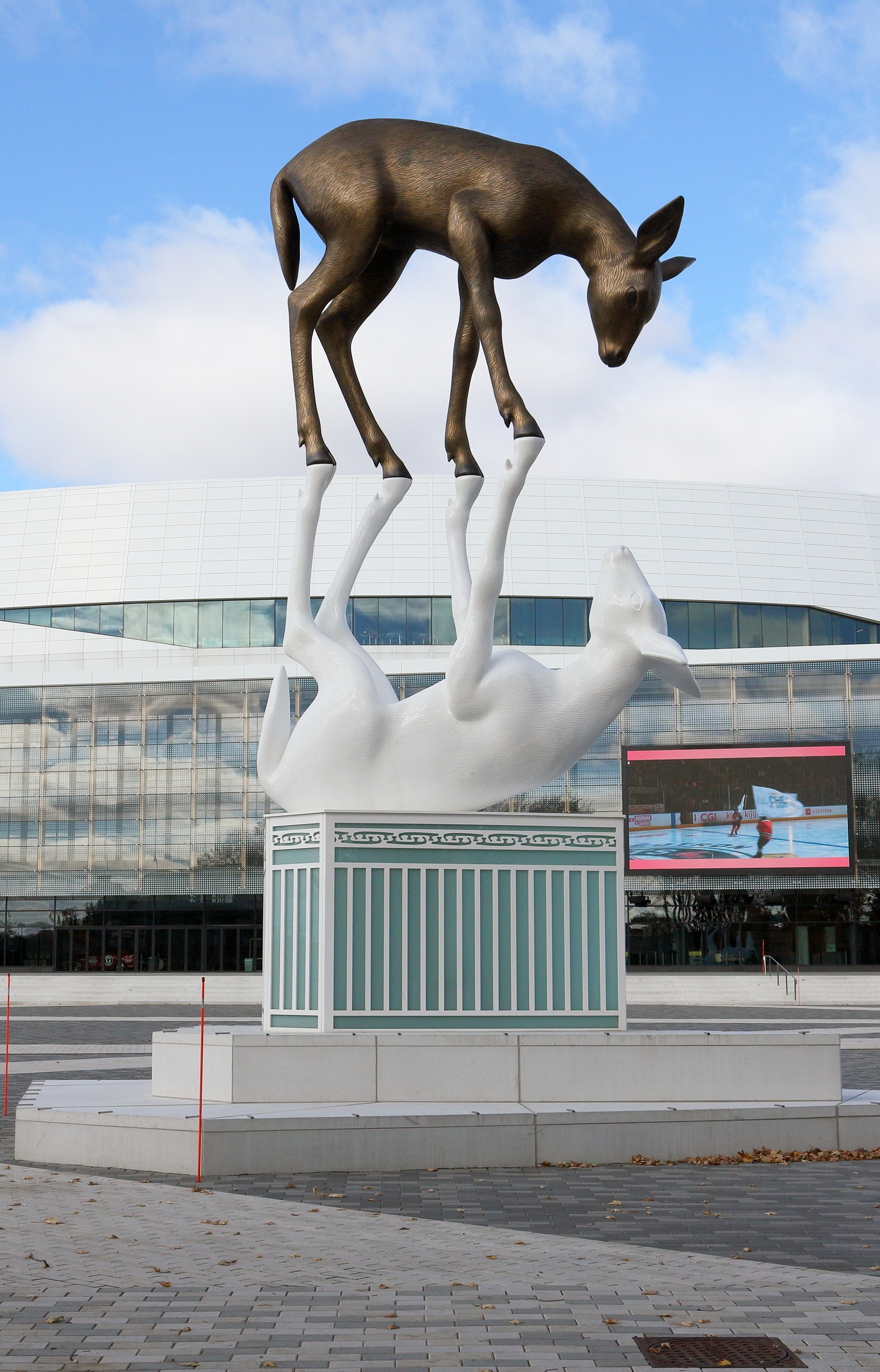
- La rencontre, public sculpture made by the collective and installed at Place Jean-Béliveau in Quebec City.
- Known for: Public art, sculpture, installations
- Movement: Contemporary art, postmodern art
- Awards: Mérite d’architecture de la Ville de Québec Prix Art public Concours d’œuvre d’art éphémère de la Place des Arts de Montreal laureate
- Website: https://cooke-sasseville.com/

Cooke-Sasseville is a contemporary, postmodern artistic duo from Quebec, created by Jean-François Cooke and Pierre Sasseville in Quebec City in 2000.^{,} The collective exhibits its works in several galleries in Quebec and abroad. Based on sculpture and installation art, Cooke-Sasseville's works mostly consist of public art projects in Quebec City and Montreal^{,} and also in Alberta and British Columbia. They have participated in exhibitions, events and residencies in Quebec, Mexico and Europe.

Past achievements include participating in group events such as the first Quebec Triennial, in 2008, as well as the 2010 instalment of Manif d'art, the Quebec City biennial (curated by the editor in chief of the international contemporary art magazine Art Papers, Sylvie Fortin). Major works of theirs were created as part of Quebec's Politique québécoise d’intégration des arts à l’architecture (a government of Quebec policy for integration of the arts into architecture), like Prendre le pouls, inaugurated in 2014, at the McGill University Health Centre in Montreal, as well as La rencontre, installed in 2017 at the Jean-Béliveau Park, in front of the Videotron Center in Quebec City.

== History ==
Jean-François Cooke was born in Chicoutimi in 1974 and Pierre Sasseville in Quebec City in 1978. Both hold a master's degree in visual arts from Université Laval. Both artists met for the first time in 1997 at the beginning of their undergraduate studies, when they were about to attend the same class at the school of visual arts at Université Laval. They have been working together since 2000. Their first collaborative work dates back to the end of their undergraduate studies and was presented at the DécouvrArts festival in Cap-Rouge, in reaction to a regulation from the city's mayor which at the time required cat owners to keep their cats on a leash outside. The work, which was dismantled by the festival team, is a photomontage placed on a vibrating support, which represents the mayor of the city surrounded by cats with the town hall in the background. In 2017, their famous work "La rencontre" was installed in 2017 at the Jean-Béliveau Park, in front of the Videotron Center in Quebec City. According to Cooke and Sasseville, it was, up to that point, the public artwork in Quebec history with the highest budget ever.

== Art overview ==
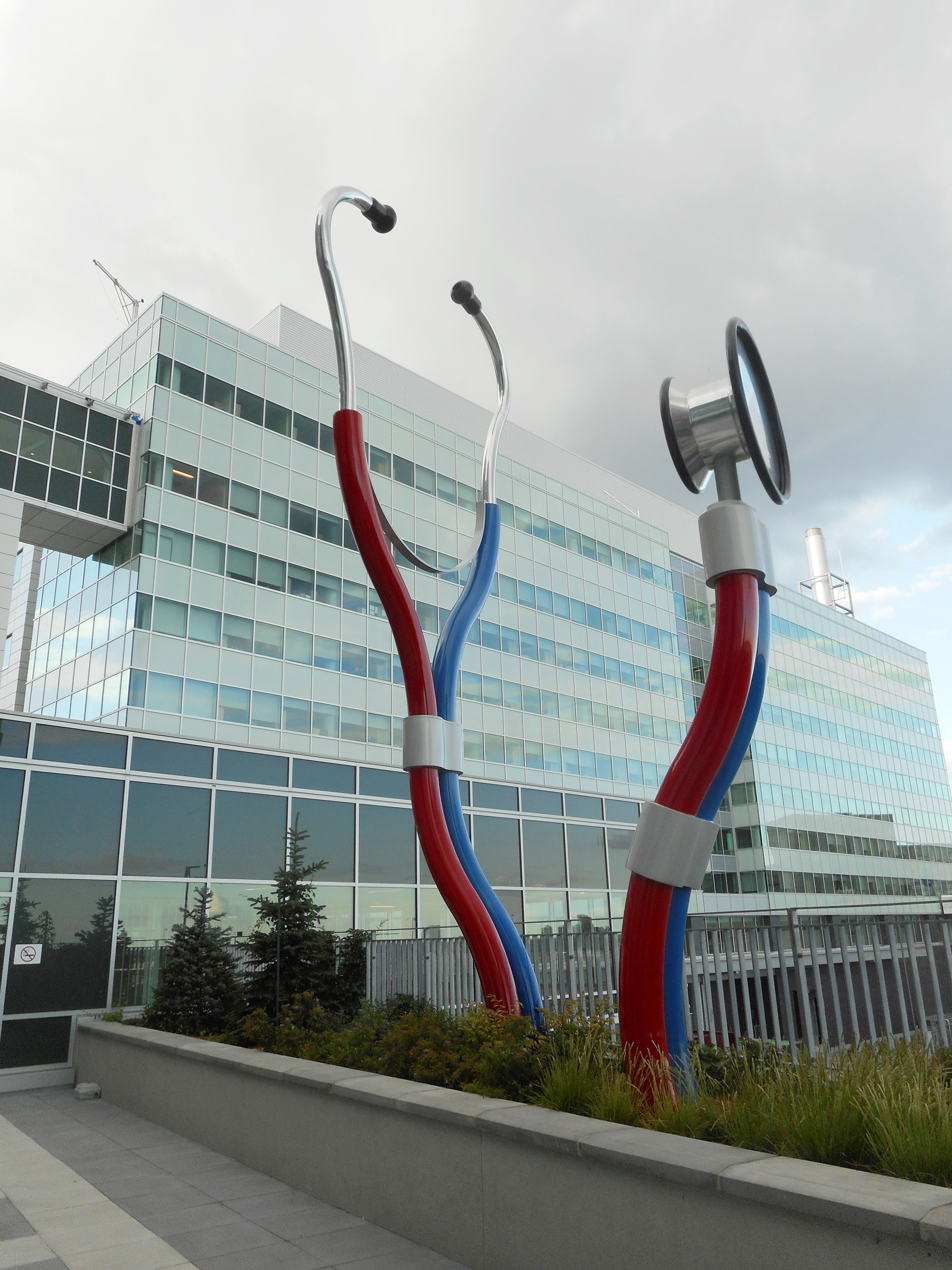
Prendre le pouls (2014), Glen Site, McGill University Health Centre in Montreal.

Their artistic work consists, among other things, of around fifteen personal exhibitions from 2002 to 2023 and around fifteen collective events in Quebec and abroad, from 2000 to 2021. Also, some of their works are part of around ten collections of works of art, both public and private. Lastly, they have to their credit some forty works of public art, mainly in Quebec, but also in Surrey, British Columbia and in St. Albert, Alberta.

=== Artistic process ===
The booklet "Cooke-Sasseville: État mortifère - Les deux pieds dans le patrimoine" states that the duo is "known for their humorous and exuberantly irreverent sculptural work [and] has been active on the national art scene for around twenty years. Their universe, willingly crazy, heterogeneous and polymorphous, constantly oscillates between absurdity and exaltation, between good-natured wonder and dark humor. Beyond the simple joke, their art has several levels of interpretation, and is anchored in Quebec's specificity by collecting nods to art history, popular culture and political and economic news. »

Defining Cooke-Sasseville's style, Anne-Marie Bouchard, Curator of modern art at the Musée national des beaux-arts du Québec, also writes that the duo "draw inspiration from media-constructed contemporary myths", and that this inspiration "is apparent in the deliberately pop form of their installations, which embraces its postmodernity by playing on pastiche, discrepancies between form and function, the uncommon use of common materials and, occasionally, blatant vulgarity as a counter to scholarly discourse".

Their creative evolution allowed them to develop an approach reflecting on the condition of the artist, alienation, advertising culture and the relationship between art and banality. The duo experiments with all sorts of materials, including aluminum, bronze, stainless steel, concrete and electrostatic paint. Through humour and provocation, they address various subjects such as sexuality, religion, politics and the art market. The two artists claim to be inspired by the London artist Damien Hirst or the Italian Maurizio Cattelan, in an iconoclastic spirit.

The elements composing their diverse works belong to the common and mundane, easily identifiable by the viewer. Animals, especially deer, are a common sight in their work. For their public pieces, they have worked in collaboration with project management teams, architects, landscape architects and engineers, sometimes even hiring a project manager to assist them with communication and logistics aspects. About their approach, Anne-Marie Bouchard adds:

"Cooke-Sasseville demonstrate a continuous engagement with more accessible codes of Western culture. While at times playing the game of beautifying and decorating the architectural landscape, the public artworks of Cooke-Sasseville nevertheless aim to showcase the structural character of public institutions. […] Combining humour and popular imagery, Cooke-Sasseville’s works stand as true testimony to art’s capacity to interact with different spheres of urban life."

=== Selected works ===
SILENCE, ON COULE (Silence, We're Shooting), 2005: The male and female genitals from the installation are juxtaposed to adjectives evoking advertising strategies ("effective", "robust" and "seductive", for example).

AUX PIEDS LA TÊTE (Head to Feet), 2006: Cut-and-paste, two-dimensional decapitated fashion figures from publicity flyers are displayed upon the wall, connected by bright red lines "lend[ing] their Dadaist subversive potential to architectural and advertising games worthy of El Lissitzky in a world of abstract fetishism recalling the art of Piet Mondrian".

VOUS PENSEZ TROP, N'Y PENSEZ PAS (You Think Too Much, Don't Think About It), 2006: The words "You think too much, don't think about it" are displayed on the wall in black and red, "hammer[ing] home a self-contradicting message expressing the dangerous vacuity of the relativism that surrounds us".

LE NOUVEAU MONDE (The New World), 2006: Barnyard animals made of popcorn "criticize the questionable Quebec agricultural policies that have turned the St. Lawrence Valley into a gigantic cornfield (dotted with pigsties)".

MOURIR ENFIN (To Die At Last), 2010: Sculptures of children wearing department-store pyjamas "[refer] to the adult word, to memories preserved, but distorted by time, of a curiously synthesized mixture of music boxes, merry-go-round, haunted house and knife thrower. Endlessly spinning on their elevated pedestal, the children are still briefly exempt from the adult awareness of the world revealed in our fixed stares at a ground forever tainted by the irreparable".

LE PETIT GÂTEAU D'OR (The Little Golden Cake), 2010: The sculpture of a golden jewel-studded cupcake comments on "the status of the perishable as a newly anointed monumental form" and "signals the ephemeral nature of value; that it exists only through actions of faith, repetition, and above all capital exchange moderated via consumption".

LA VIE EN ROSE (Life in Rosy Hues), 2010: Sculptures of pink flamingoes "[question] the connection between the symbolic value of an object and that of its component materials".

CIRCULATION (Flow), 2015: This two-part sculpture is located at the Grandview Heights Aquatic Centre. The pipes, inspired by the pipes of the pool, are painted red and blue to represent bloodflow. On the west side of the Centre, a fawn is drinking from a faucet attached to the pipes. On the northern side, several water-like deers emerge from other pipes, implying that the sculptures are connecting somewhere under the building. These elements reflect the Aquatic Centre's roles as both a place of leisure and competition, the fawn symbolizing youth and play, while the deer symbolizing adulthood and sport. Their imaginary link implies that work and play are both components of a healthy lifestyle.

SUIVRE SON COURS (To Follow Its Course), 2017: A lead pencil is attached by zip-tie to a dandelion, potentially representing education acting as a tutor for a growing flower.

LA RENCONTRE (The Encounter), 2017: Probably one of their most well-known sculpture, these two stags facing each other evoke themes of balance, reflection, confrontation, and nordicity. Installed in front on Place Jean-Béliveau, right in front of the Videotron Centre, the pair engages once again with the location's purpose, merely the encounter with oneself, the encounter with others, the face-to-face, the search for balance experienced in a busy and festive environment.

LES GARDIENS (The Gardians), 2018: The human eye is intimately linked to the lighthouse in popular imagery since together they suggest the paradoxical idea of seeing and being seen. Installed on a huge colourful steel pipe that seems to come out of the ground, this gigantic eyeball adorned with a sailor's hat turns on itself. It is thus having a panoramic view of the surrounding environment.

MIGRATION, 2018: Through a set of scales and shapes, this sculptural installation connects two emblematic symbols of Canada: the goose and the wheat sheaf. Geese live throughout the territory and symbolize community life, strength of the group, and migration. As for the sheaf of wheat, it illustrates the importance of agriculture in the economic and social development of the country.

BATTRE LE SENTIER (To Beat the Trail), 2021: Installed at Zoo sauvage de Saint-Félicien, the artwork depicts colorful deer defying gravity on a metal pole, a call back to the zoo's surrounding fauna and flora.

== List of artworks ==
=== Public art ===
==== 2004 to 2010 ====
- La ville aux animaux (ephemeral work), 2004, esplanade de la Place-des-Arts, Montreal.
- Les inséparables, 2008, Beausoleil Primary School, Quebec City.
- De vous à moi, 2009, Saint-Charles River linear park, Quebec City.
- Refaire surface, 2010, Complexe sportif multidisciplinaire de L’Ancienne-Lorette.

==== 2011 ====
- Point de mire, Gosselin Park, Thetford Mines.
- Le mélomane, Joseph-François-Perrault park, Montreal.
- Mélangez le tout, Jean-Claude-Malépart Center, Montreal.

==== 2013 ====
- Le passe-temps, Massif de Charlevoix Ski Resort, Petite-Rivière-Saint-François.
- La conciliation des contraintes, Domaine Forget in Charlevoix, Saint-Irénée, Quebec.

==== 2014 ====
- L'Odyssée, Petit Champlain, Quebec City.^{,}
- Tapis rouge, Salle de spectacle de Gaspé, Gaspé.
- Première classe, Everest Primary School, Quebec City.
- Prendre le pouls, Glen Site, McGill University Health Centre, Montreal.

==== 2015 ====
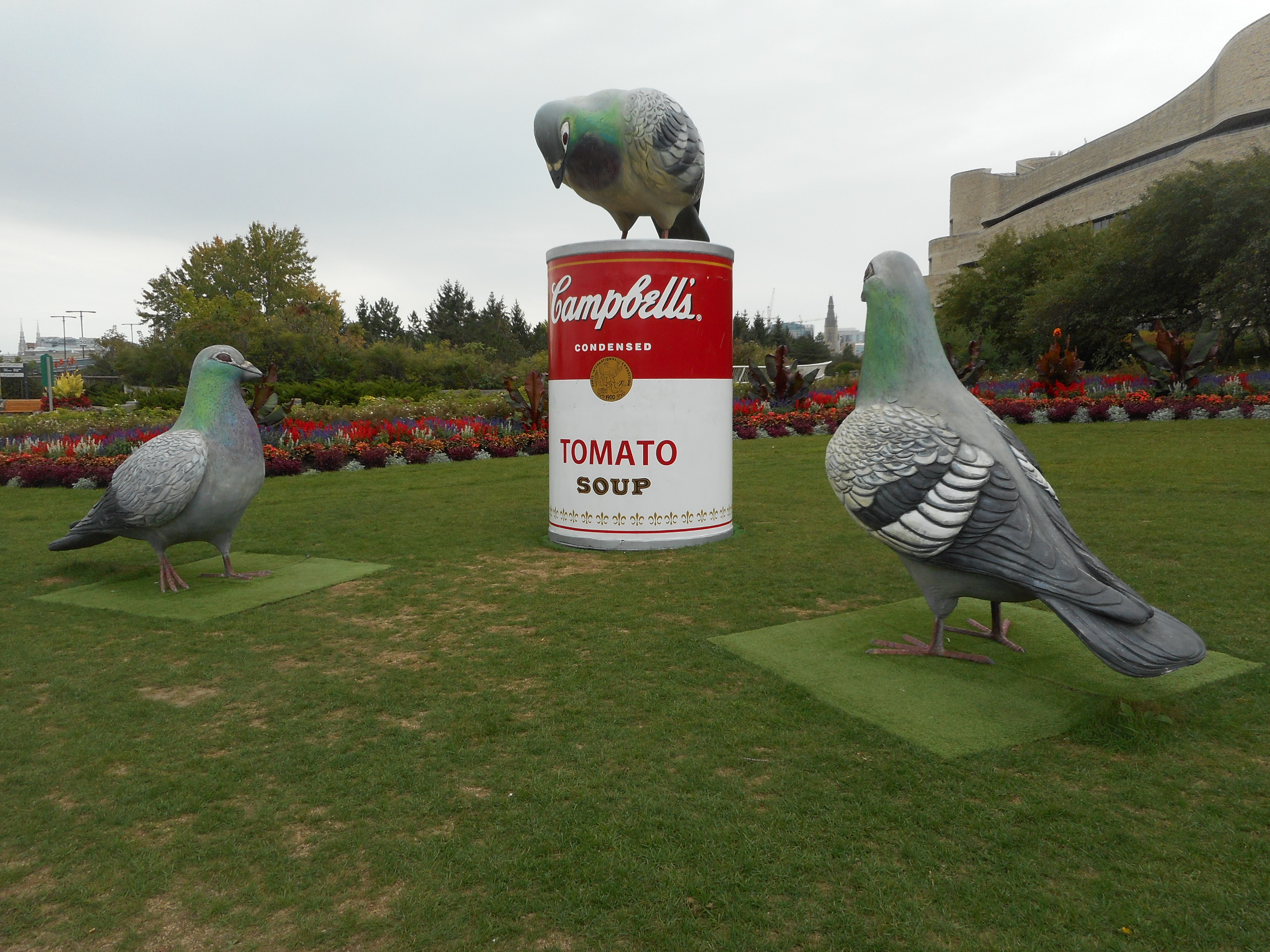
L'odyssée (2014), Petit Champlain in Quebec City.

- L'attraction, Gare fluviale de Lévis.
- Circulation, Grandview Heights Aquatic Center, Surrey, BC.
- De l'eau sur le feu, Place St-Thomas-De-Villeneuve, Quebec City.

==== 2016 ====
- La croisée des chemins, terminal de croisière Quai-A Lepage, La Baie.^{,}

==== 2017 ====
- Suivre son cours, new primary school in Val-Bélair:
- La trajectoire, Centre communautaire du jardin, Quebec City.
- La rencontre, Place Jean-Béliveau, Quebec City^{,}

==== 2018 ====
- Les gardiens, public ephemeral artwork, Place des Canotiers, Quebec City, Quebec and A.C. Davie Shipyard national historic site in Lévis.^{,}
- Migration, Sainte-Anne Street roundabout, St. Albert, Alberta.
- Le banquet, Parc des loisirs de Château-Richer.

==== 2020 ====
- La multiplication des neurones, Cégep de Rivière-du-Loup, Rivière-du-Loup.
- L'accord, Sûreté du Québec post, Saint-Georges-de-Beauce.

==== 2021 ====
- Le fruit maudit, public ephemeral artwork in Maison O’Neill Park.
- Révéler ses couleurs, Polyvalente Le Boisé, Victoriaville.
- Le Parcours, Pavillon du parc de la Pointe-aux-Lièvres, Quebec City.
- Jeux de clés, Stade de la Cité des jeunes, Rivière-du-Loup.
- Dessine-moi une chenille, Bardy Park, Quebec City.
- Battre le sentier, Zoo sauvage de Saint-Félicien, Saint-Félicien.

==== 2022 ====
- Bâtir le monde, new secondary school in Gatineau.
- Trouver son sens, Gaspé Hospital.

=== Art exhibitions ===
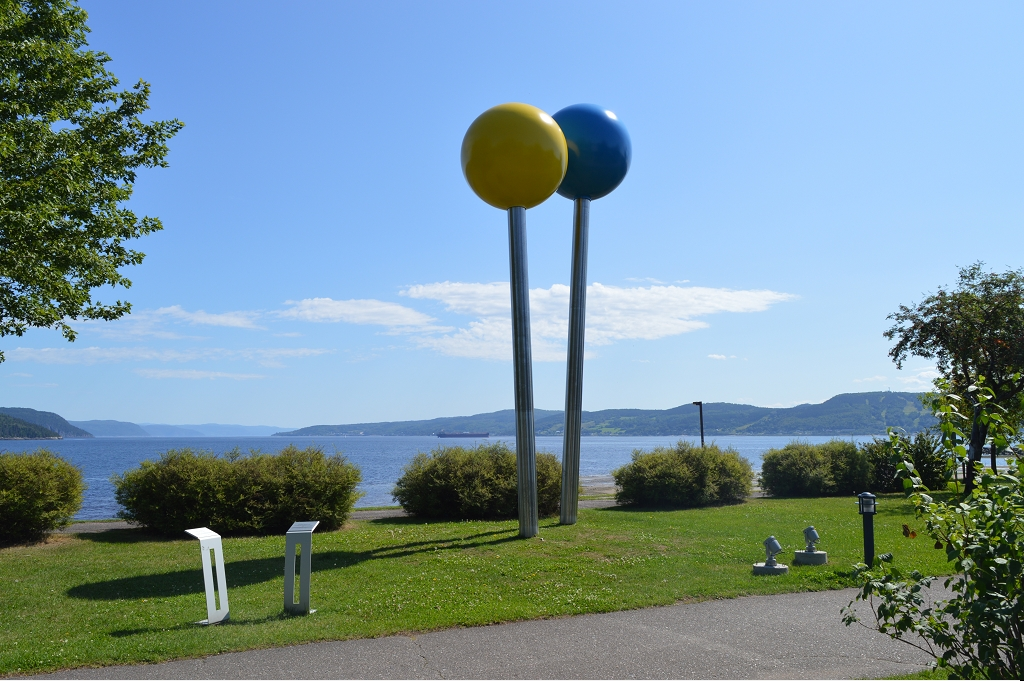
La croisée des chemins (2016), Quai A-Lepage cruise terminal in La Baie.

This is a non-exhaustive list of Cooke-Sasseville's art expositions.

==== 2000 ====
Exercice de consommation, Vie-trine event, Saguenay.

==== 2001 ====
Le Buisson ardant, Rouje - Arts et événements, Quebec City.

==== 2002 ====
- Sacré Cerveau, Rouje - Arts et événements, Quebec City.
- 256 pieds carrés de bonheur, Artbord event, Saguenay.

==== 2003 ====
- Le Mur des Lamentations, Centre d'artiste Langage Plus, Alma.
- L'Envie, Manif d'art 2, Quebec City^{,}
- Le Boggie, Kits de manifestation event, Folie/Culture, Quebec City.

==== 2004 ====
- La ville aux animaux, Esplanade de la Place des Arts, Montreal.
- La Vache perdue, exposition indépendante Massacre à la scie, Quebec City, curators Josée Landry Sirois, Catherine Plaisance and Eugénie Cliche.
- La Famille Élargie, 8th edition of the Festival de théâtre de rue de Shawinigan.

==== 2005 ====
- Le Plus beau jour de ma vie, Centre d'art Skol, Montreal; L'Œil de Poisson, Quebec City.
- Zone de défoulement divin, Urbaine urbanité III, Saint-Aloysius Park, Montreal.
- Silence, on coule, C'est arrivé près de chez vous exposition, Musée national des beaux-arts du Québec,^{,} Quebec City.
- Cooke-Sasseville, Demi-Dieux, Créer avec un artiste event, Musée national des beaux-arts du Québec, Quebec City.

==== 2006 ====
- Le Nouveau Monde, Orange - L’événement d’art actuel de Saint-Hyacinthe (made in popcorn).
- Aux pieds la tête, Espace Virtuel, Saguenay.
- Allée simple, Journées de la culture, The Battlefields Park, Quebec City.
- Vous pensez trop, n'y pensez pas, Espace Virtuel, Saguenay.
- Vous faites pitié à voir, Centre d'art Skol, Montreal; Rouje - Art et événements, Quebec City.

==== 2008 ====
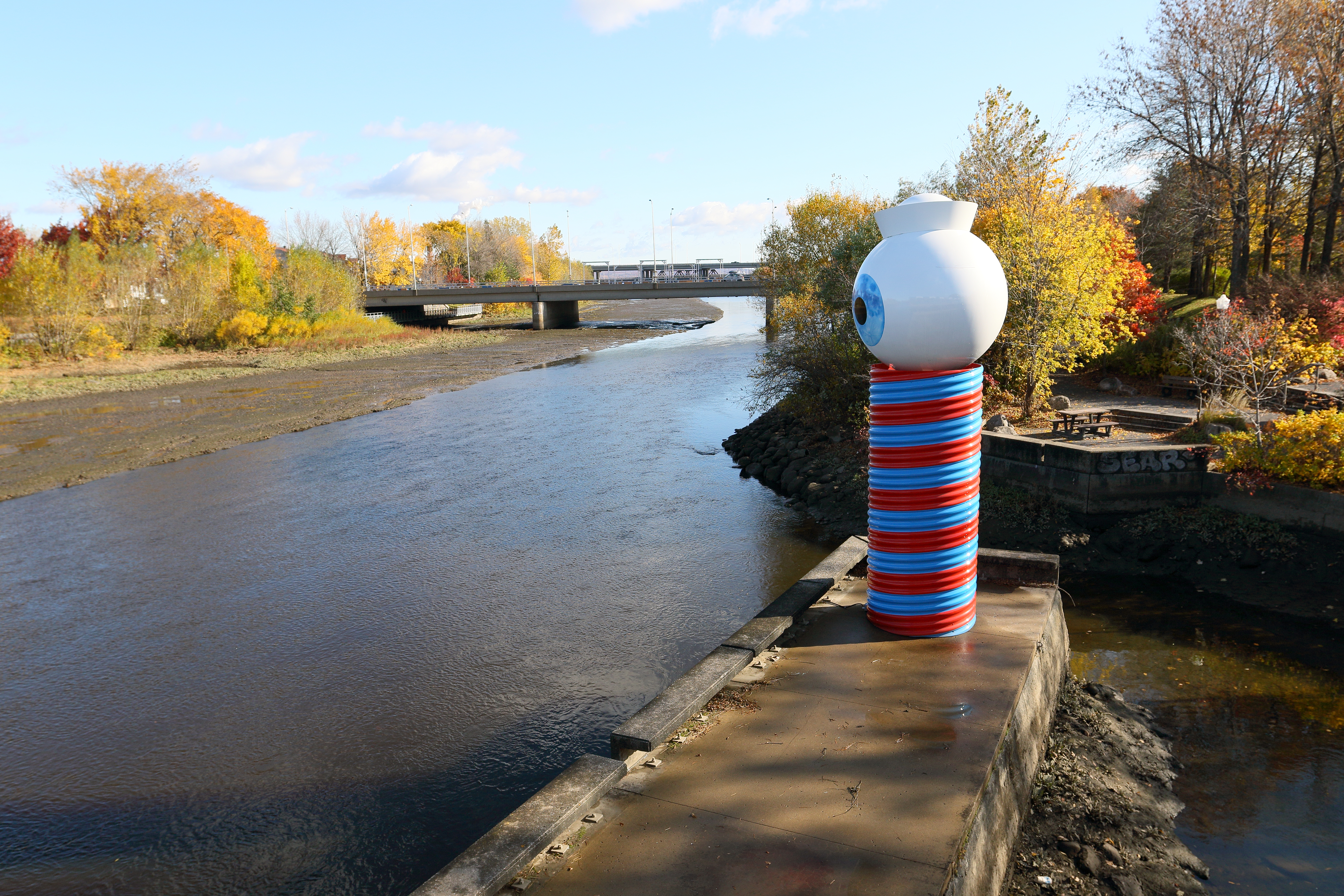
Les Gardiens (2018), an ephemeral artwork that was located at Place des Canotiers in Quebec City and on the Davie Shipbuilding historical site in Lévis.

- Si j'avais su…, Plein Sud, Longueuil
- Parlez-en à votre médecin, Salon des métiers d'art de Montréal.
- Dérapage et Rire Jaune, Musée de la civilisation, Quebec City.
- Jeu de blocs, Musée d'art contemporain de Montréal.^{,}
- Victoire sur la banane, Québec Gold - Palace of Tau, France.
- Les Domestiques, Repérage, Collection Loto-Québec, Manif d'art 4, Quebec City.

==== 2010 ====
- La Vie en rose, Centre d'artiste Regart, Lévis; Art Souterrain, Montreal.
- Série LVG (Lunette Van Gogh), Art Mûr, Montreal.
- Mourir enfin, Manif d'art 5, Quebec City.
- Le Petit gâteau d'or, Art Mûr, Montreal (made in gold, silver, diamonds, emeralds, garnets, rhodolites, rubies, topazes, amethysts and sapphires)^{,}, Montreal.

==== 2013 ====
- Cooke-Sasseville : Patrimoine bâti, Art Mûr, Montreal.

==== 2014 ====
- L'Ascension.

==== 2017 ====
- Longue portée (made in bronze and stainless steel).

==== 2018 ====
- La Traversée (made in vinyl, wood and 22 carats gold).
- La Ponte.

=== Gallery works ===
Name	Year	Technique	Dimensions
ALLÉE SIMPLE	2006		274 X 244 X 1219 cm
AUX PIEDS LA TÊTE	2006		274 X 660 X 1900 cm
LE NOUVEAU MONDE	2006	Popcorn	457 X 920 X 1829 cm
LE PETIT GÂTEAU D'OR	2010	Gold, silver, diamonds, emeralds, garnets, rhodolites, rubies, topazes, amethysts, sapphires	7 X 6 X 6 cm
L'ASCENSION	2014		122 X 183 X 274 cm
LONGUE PORTÉE	2017	Bronze and stainless steel	18 X 18 X 31 cm
LA TRAVERSÉE	2018	Vinyl, wood, 22 carats gold	153 X 97 X 60 cm
LA PONTE	2018		

=== Scenography ===
- 2018 : Bonne retraite Jocelyne, play script and staging by Fabien Cloutier.
- 2012 : La pêche miraculeuse, in collaboration with Fabien Cloutier, Carrefour international de théâtre, Quebec City.
- 2008 : Festival Folk de Québec, stagedressing, Quebec City.

== Awards and recognition ==
- 2018 : Mérite d’architecture de la Ville de Québec, catégorie Œuvre d’art.
- 2012 : Mélangez-tout, prix Art public, Gala des arts visuels, Association des galeries d'art contemporain (AGAC).
- 2004 : La ville aux animaux, Concours d’œuvre d’art éphémère de la Place des Arts de Montréal laureate.
- 2003 à 2021 : Recipient of about 15 grants and financing supporting research and creation from the Canada Council for the Arts, the Conseil des arts et des lettres du Québec, Quebec City and Loto-Québec.

== Picture gallery ==
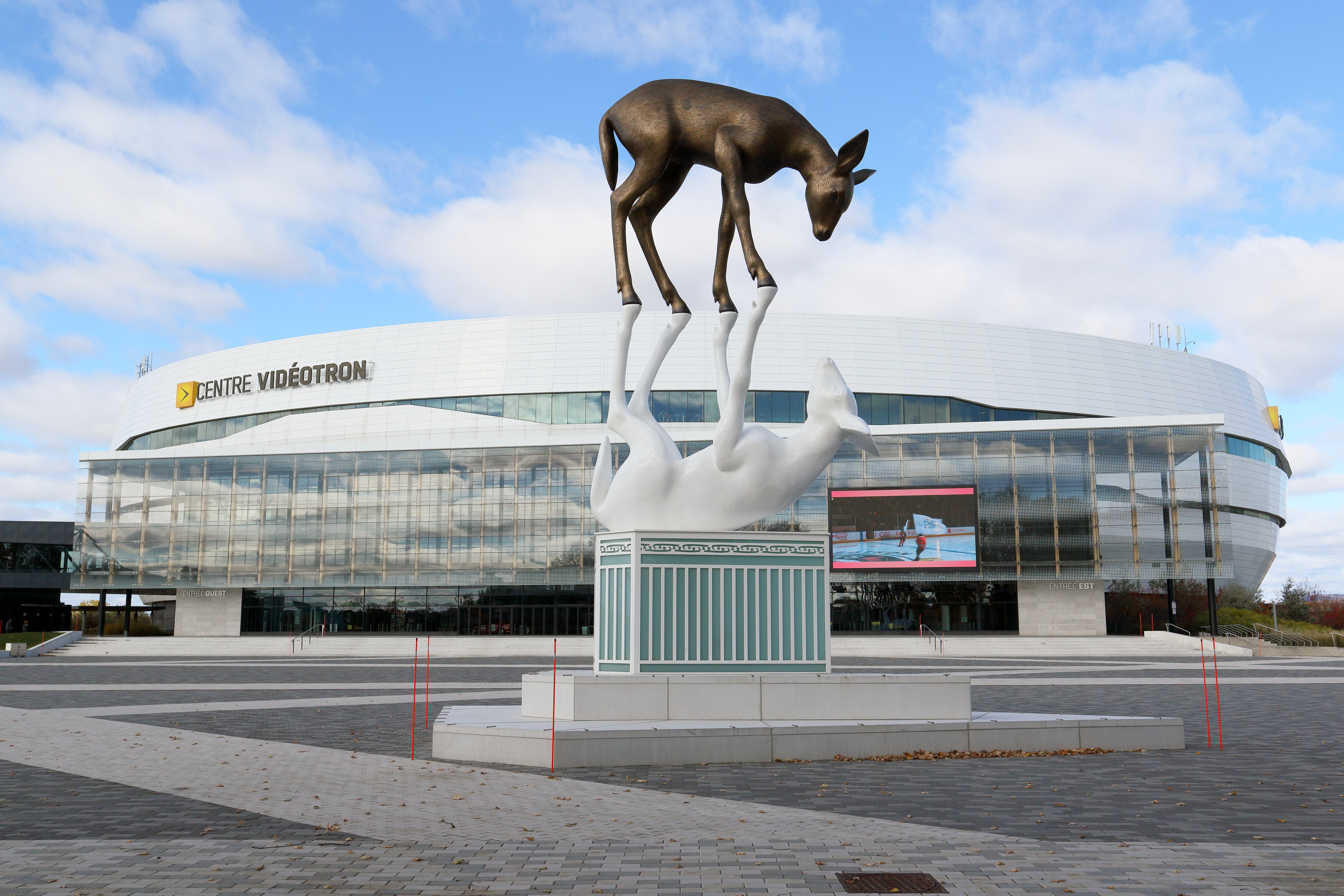
La rencontre (2017), Place Jean-Béliveau in Quebec City.

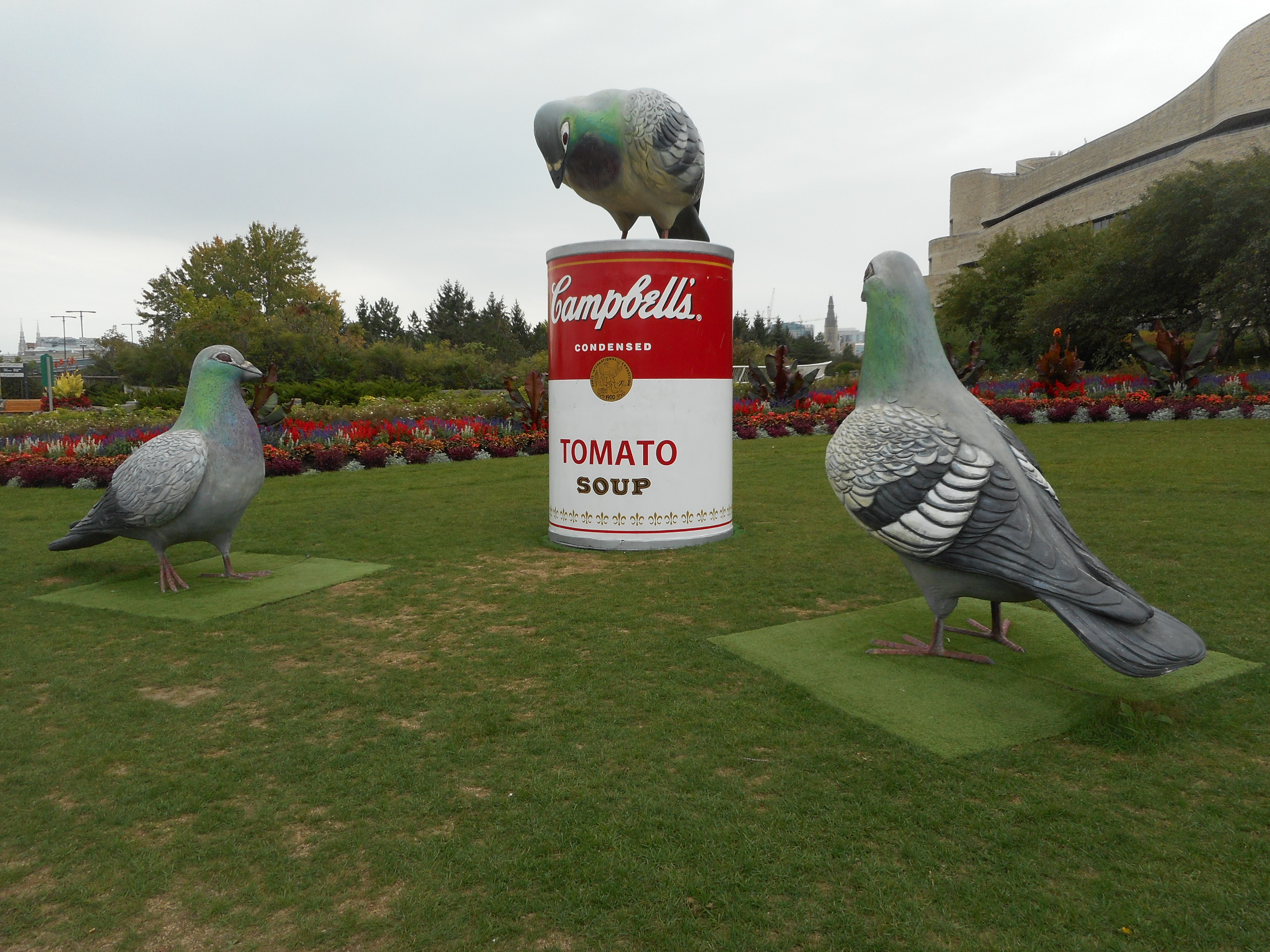
L'odyssée (2014), Petit Champlain in Quebec City.

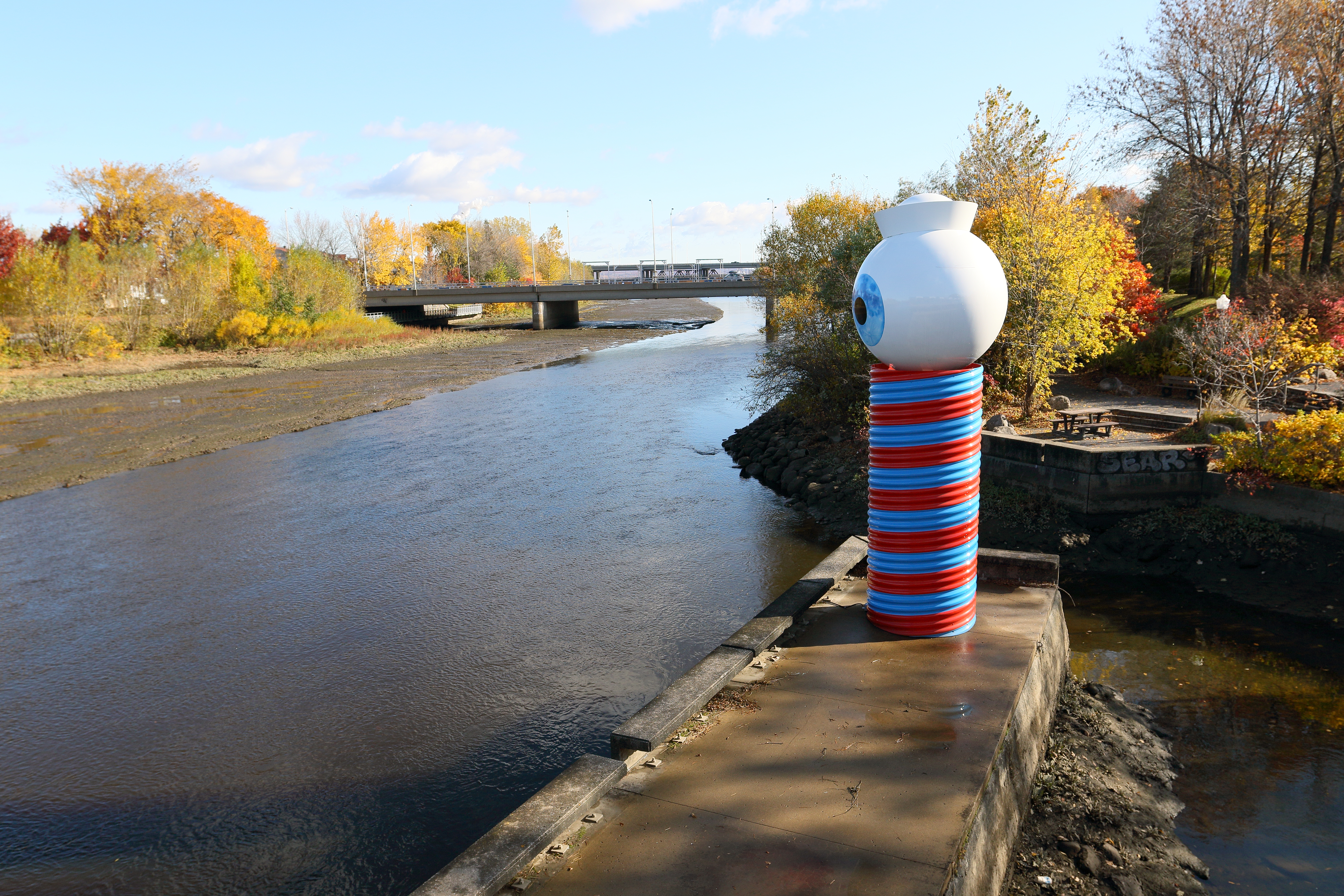
Les Gardiens (2018), an ephemeral artwork that was located at Place des Canotiers in Quebec City and on the Davie Shipbuilding historical site in Lévis.

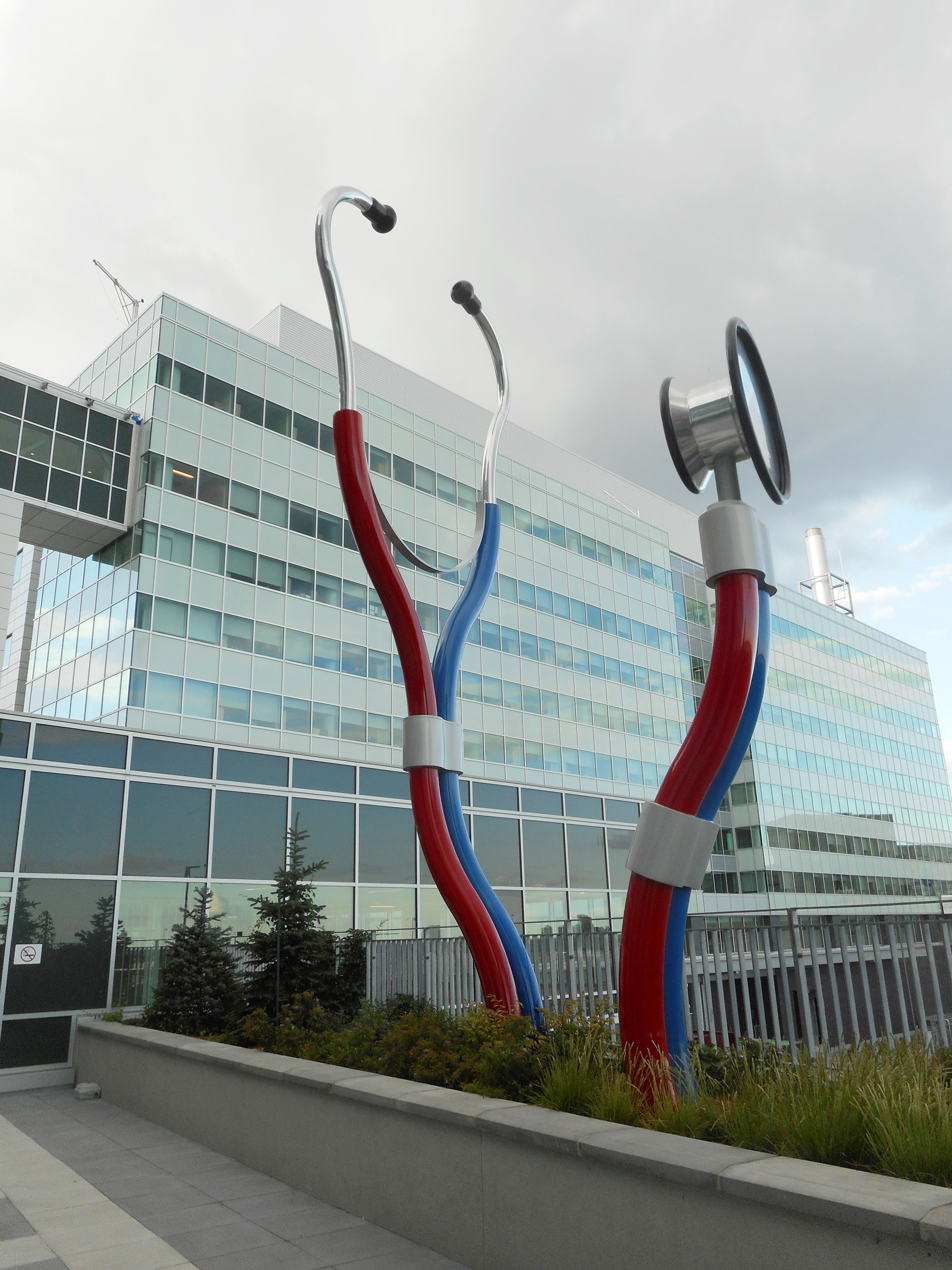
Prendre le pouls (2014), Glen Site, McGill University Health Centre in Montreal.

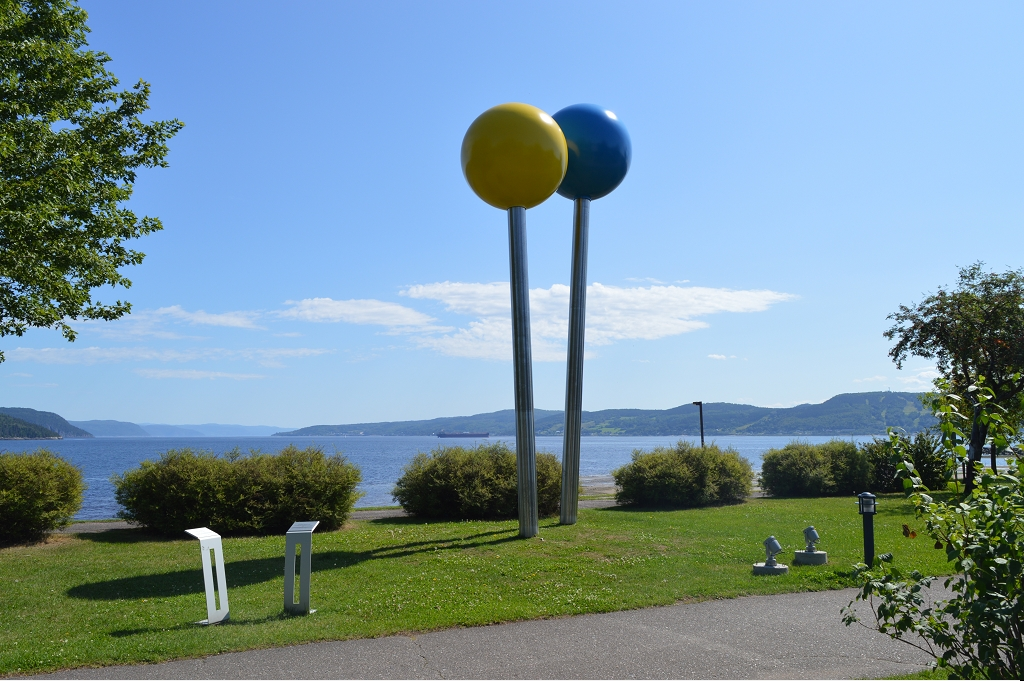
La croisée des chemins (2016), Quai A-Lepage cruise terminal in La Baie.

== See also ==
=== Further reading ===
- Bouchard, Anne-Marie (2012). Rattray, Michael (ed.). De Cooke-Sasseville à aujourd'hui (in Canadian French). Montreal: Éditions Art mûr. p. 116. ISBN 978-2-923243-05-4. OCLC 812081483.

=== External links ===
- Official website
- Profile on the Musée national des beaux-arts du Québec website
