= Shamel Pitts =

American choreographer (born 1985)

- Born: 1985 (age 40–41); Brooklyn, New York
- Education: BFA in Dance
- Alma mater: Juilliard School
- Occupations: Artist, choreographer, performer and teacher
- Awards: Fellow, MacArthur Fellowship; Fellow, United States Artists; Fellow, John Simon Guggenheim Memorial Foundation; Fellow in choreography, the New York Foundation for the Arts; Fellow in choreography, Princess Grace Foundation-USA; Fellow-Level 1, YoungArts Foundation
- Website: https://shamelpitts.com/

Shamel Pitts is an American artist, choreographer, performer and teacher. He is the founder and artistic director at TRIBE which is a New York-based multidisciplinary arts collective. He is best known for his creation of a triptych of multidisciplinary performance art works entitled Black Series and as a cast member of the 2021 Bessie Award-winning production of The Motherboard Suite at New York Live Arts.

In 2024, Pitts was awarded a MacArthur Foundation Fellowship, popularly known as the MacArthur Foundation's "Genius Award." He is also a 2026 United Starts Artists (USA) Fellow, 2020 Guggenheim Fellow, a 2018 Princess Grace Foundation fellow, and a fellow in choreography of the New York Foundation for the Arts.

== Early life and education ==
Pitts was born in Brooklyn, New York in 1985, but he spent most of his 20s in Tel Aviv, Israel. He started training in dance at Fiorello H. LaGuardia High School for Music and Art & The Performing Arts, and simultaneously, at LaGuardia High School for Music and Art, while studying Performing Arts at The Ailey School at the same time. For his BFA in Dance, he attended The Juilliard School and he was given the Martha Hill Award for excellence in dance.

== Career ==
Pitts began his career at Mikhail Baryshnikov's Hell's Kitchen Dance, Sidra Bell dance New York and BJM_Danse, Montreal (Formerly known as Les Ballets Jazz De Montreal). Under the artistic direction of Ohad Naharin in Israel, he danced with Batsheva Dance Company for 7 years. He has been a teacher for both, the Batsheva Dance Company and The Young Ensemble. He has served as an artist in residence at Harvard University and also an adjunct at The Juilliard School. In 2016, he moved to Brazil where he started his work with Mirelle Martins, a Brazilian performance artist on BLACK VELVET.

Pitts is the Founder and artistic director of the Tribe, a Brooklyn-based art collective, which received the 92Y Harkness Dance Center's Artists in Residence for the 2020–2021 season.

TRIBE is currently a Live Feed artist in residence at New York Live Arts under the artistic direction of Bill T. Jones.

== Works ==
Pitts has worked extensively as a choreographer, dancer, and teacher. In 2020, Pitts choreographed the play Help, by Claudia Rankine, directed by Taibi Magar, and commissioned at The Shed in New York. With the collaboration of photographer Alex Apt, Pitts produced a work which portrays human expression through physical emotion inside of very intense climates and natural landscapes.

As a conceptual artist and choreographer, Pitts has also created a triptych of multidisciplinary performance art works entitled: Black Box: Little Black Book Of Red, Black Velvet: Architectures And Archetypes, and Black Hole: Trilogy And Triathlon. This BLACK SERIES engaged 11 artists.

=== Black Box: Little Black Book Of RED ===
After leaving the Batsheva Dance Company, Pitts focused on his own work and received a lot of recognition for his first poetic dance performance called Black Box: Little Black Book of the Red. While performing Black Box, he has constructed a personal, poetic narrative about the search for identity and striving for survival amidst impermanence, while using of spoken words, evocative lighting, and video. The New York Times reviews that "Black Box: The Little Black Book of Red is a dark, electrifying solo that incorporates some of Mr. Pitts’s writing on identity, a self-portrait of a dynamic dancer finding himself in a foreign land." Ora Brafman states that the texts of the performance "expose a scarred soul, extreme sensitivity for the body and the music of the language..."

=== Black Velvet: Architectures And Archetypes ===
In 2018, Pitts performed Black Velvet, expressing the sensibility of ideals, models and textures as a projection of self. In this performance, he used specific setting and objects such as ladder, a dress, spoken word, and lighting executed by projection as a symbolism to convey a particular meaning. The New York Times described the performance as "A haunting duet", which shows the “imprint of his unmistakable style — gooey and guttural, rooted in his signature movement system known as Gaga.” Joy Bernard is of the view that "BlackVelvet places a strong emphasis on the black identity of both of its performers."

=== Black Hole: Trilogy And Triathlon ===
Black Hole is a kaleidoscopic performance art in which three black artists unite to create a trinity of vigor, afro-futurism, and embrace. In 2018, the project was developed with the support of TMU, American Dance Abroad, gloATL, PearlArts Studios, Dock 11 / Eden, Derida Dance Center, and Patrons, and was premiered in Sofia, Bulgaria and performed in Berlin; Verbania; Jerusalem.

== Awards and honors ==
- 2003 – Fellow-Level 1, YoungArts Foundation
- 2018 – Choreography Fellowship, Princess Grace Award
- 2019 – Fellow in choreography, the New York Foundation for The Arts
- 2020 – Jacob's Pillow artist in residence
- 2020 – Fellow, John Simon Guggenheim Memorial Foundation
- 2024 – MacArthur Fellow
- 2026 – Fellow, United States Artists
