= Deanna Dikeman =

American photographer (born 1954)

- Born: April 3, 1954 (age 72); Sioux City, Iowa, USA
- Education: Purdue University
- Known for: Photography
- Awards: United States Artists Fellowship grant 2008; Prix Nadar 2021 Leaving and Waving
- Website: deannadikeman.com

Deanna Dikeman (born April 3, 1954) is an American photographer.

== Early life and education ==
Dikeman was born in Sioux City, Iowa, USA. She received a BS in Biology (1976) and an MS in management (1979) from Purdue University, West Lafayette, Indiana.

== Work ==
Dikeman's book Leaving and Waving (2021) consists of photographs of her parents waving goodbye as she drives from their home after a visit. It was made over a 27 year period beginning in 1991.

== Publications ==
- 27 Good-byes. Self-published, 2009.
- Leaving and Waving. Marseille: Chose Commune, 2021.
- Relative Moments. Marseille: Chose Commune, 2024.

== Awards ==
- 2008: United States Artists Fellowship grant from United States Artists. A $50,000 award.
- 2021: Prix Nadar from the Association Gens d'Images, France for Leaving and Waving
- 2023: Guggenheim Fellowship from the John Simon Guggenheim Memorial Foundation

== Exhibitions ==
- Leaving and Waving, Sioux City Public Museum, Sioux City, Iowa, August–October 2023

== Collections ==
Dikeman's work is held in the following permanent collections:

- Museum of Contemporary Photography, Chicago, Illinois
- Nelson-Atkins Museum of Art, Kansas City, Missouri
