= Layale Chaker =

French-Lebanese violinist and composer, born 1990

Layale Chaker (Arabic: ليال شاكر; born 1990) is a French-Lebanese violinist and composer whose music integrates elements of classical, contemporary, jazz, Arabic music and improvisation.

== Music career ==
She was born in Paris and moved to Lebanon at the age of 6. In 2005, Chaker began her musical studies at the National Higher Conservatory of Beirut. She later studied at the Conservatoire Régional de Paris beginning in 2010 and the Royal Academy of Music in London starting in 2017 with professors including Mohamed Hashem, Carmen Scripcariu, Jeanne-Marie Conquer and Nicholas Miller. She currently performs with the West-Eastern Divan Orchestra under Daniel Barenboim.

Chaker has performed at a variety of festivals and concert halls. Festival highlights include La Biennale di Venezia, Spoleto Festival, London Jazz Festival, Alderburgh Festival, Morgenland Festival Osnabrueck, Junger Kunstler Festival Bayreuth, Lucerne Festival for Contemporary Music, Impuls’ Festival, Beethoven Festival Bonn and Avignon Festival. She has performed at concert halls such as Berlin Philharmonie, Abbaye de Royaumont, Hancher Auditorium, Stone, National Sawdust, Banff Centre, Royal Albert Hall and Wigmore Hall.

Her debut album, Inner Rhyme, with her chamber jazz ensemble Sarafand, was released on Circle Records in 2019, incorporating Arabic poetic meters. The album ranked #2 on NPR's 10 Best Releases and #1 on the World Charts of iTunes and Amazon Music for several weeks. Additionally, the album received the AFAC 2018 fund and a "Top of The World" distinction from Songlines with a 5-star review.

On May 17, 2024, she released two albums, Vigil and Radio Afloat recorded on Circle Records. Vigil features new-music string quartet, ETHEL, with piece contributions by each quartet member and two piece contributions by Chaker. Her album Radio Afloat, with Sarafand takes inspiration from the Arabic poem, “The Trace of Blue Passion” by Lebanese poet Ounsi El Hage, and portrays a radio floating at sea, attempting to get back to its rightful place on land. Radio Afloat explores the connection between people and the natural world.

== Compositions ==
- Dawning (2023)
- Ruinous Gods, Seven Suites for Sleeping Children (2024)
- Matrescence (2023)
- In the Presence of Absence: In Memoriam Edward Said (2022)
- Anatomy of Titus: Fall of Rome (2022)
- The Bow and the Reed (2022)
- Before Bloom (2021)
- Bond of the Beloved (2020)
- Ghalia's Miles (2019)
- Mouhawala Oula (2019)
- Sinekeman (2019)
- Two Coasts: Past and Recent Streams (2019)
- The Brown Texts (2018)
- Moonchild: Songs from the Hinder Sea (2018)
- Mkhammas (2018)
- Confused Cherry Tree (2018)
- Borderland (2018)
- Hints on Memory, poem for violin and string orchestra (2017)
- Tied to your name by Water (2017)

== Awards and recognition ==
- 2026: United States Artists Fellowship
- 2022: Opera America Discovery Award
- 2020-2022: Jerome Hill Fellowship
- 2021: Sundance Art of Practice Fellowship
- 2021: Dumbarton Oaks Composition Residency
- 2020: Inaugural Silkroad Seeds Award
- 2019: Laureate of the Concours international de Chant-Piano Nadia et Lili Boulanger
- 2019: Rolex mentor and Protege Prize finalist
- 2019: Diaphonique Franco-British Commission Prize
- 2018: Arab Fund for Arts and Culture Grant
- 2018: Royal Academy of Music Guinness Award
- 2017: Ruth Anderson Competition

== Personal life ==
Chaker currently lives in Brooklyn, New York, and is studying at École des Hautes Études in Paris for her doctoral degree.
