= Kukuli Velarde =

Peruvian artist

- Born: November 29, 1962; Cusco, Peru
- Education: Bachelor of Fine Arts from Hunter College (New York)
- Known for: Ceramics
- Website: kukulivelarde.com

Kukuli Velarde (born November 29, 1962) is a Peruvian artist based in Philadelphia, Pennsylvania. She specializes in painting and ceramic sculptures made out of clay and terra-cotta. Velarde focuses on the themes of gender and the repercussions of colonization on Latin American history, with a particular interest in Peru. Her ceramics consist of unusual body positions, childlike faces, and works that have been molded from her own face as well.

== Biography ==
Kukuli Velarde was born in Cusco, Peru, to journalist parents who held high expectations for her. At a young age, Velarde started to express herself through art, particularly painting, even getting to the point of being recognized as a sensation because of her advanced skills. Though recognized as a talented painter, Velarde felt pressure to continue doing art, which led to her having a fallout with her craft.

During 1984, Velarde lived in Mexico and attended the Academy of San Carlos in Mexico City, allowing her to reconnect with art. In 1988, she headed to the United States, where she continued her artwork by creating ceramic sculptures and received her Bachelor in Fine Arts from Hunter College in New York.

== Career ==
Velarde primarily uses clay to create sculptures with pre-Columbian inspiration. Mainly using red clay, Velarde creates ceramics that depict Pre-Columbian times and the aftermath of colonization. Velarde in a way is sticking to her Peruvian roots. Velarde also chooses to use clay for her work because of the personal connection she feels to it, since red clay is known to have been traditionally used in Pre-Columbian Peru. In the beginning of Velarde's ceramics journey, she makes connections to her travels in Peru and recognizes the red clay that she had seen in pottery of South American countries. She explains that when she discovered this medium ”It was like magic; it was amazing! I felt like a mute who suddenly found her voice!”

== Artwork ==
Santa Chingada: The Perfect Little Woman (1999–2000) by Kukuli Velarde at the Renwick Gallery in Washington, DC in 2022

=== We, The Colonized Ones ===
From 1990 to 1992, Velarde worked on and exhibited her series We, The Colonized Ones in New York. For the collection Velarde used red and white clay ceramics, which scholar Fernando Torres Quirós stated was meant to convey the emotions of the indigenous under the domination of Europeans. He further stated that Velarde paid special attention in portraying the pain of her ancestors by focusing on facial features. Velarde further describes in a 1996 interview that “if it's true that spirits exist, some of those millions of people might inhabit these sculptures. They are like a summoning of those ancestors I don't know, whose languages I don't speak”. Per Ivor Miller, traditional methods of ceramics, such as unglazed sculptures, are incorporated into this series, purposely showing a disconnection to Western methods. Velarde's work is influenced by what she explains in the 1996 interview as Indigenous aesthetics. Indigenous aesthetics are portrayed after colonization occurred and Indians in Peru were forced to wear Spanish style clothes. Over time, Indians had altered the Spanish clothing to fit their own Indigenous aesthetics showing the resilience of Indigenous peoples and how they were able to preserve parts of their culture. The series also includes short performances and installations, the former of which includes Velarde utilizing her ceramics and herself to show a story of colonization in Peruvian history.

=== Plunder Me Baby ===
Plunder Me Baby (2007), a series of ceramic sculptures, is one of Velarde's works that has been shown in different exhibitions throughout the United States and Peru. The American Museum of Ceramic Art, explains Velarde's inspiration for this show as a childhood memory where her nanny denied her indigenous roots by claiming she couldn't speak the Inca language Quechua, which later prompted her to create sculptures as a way to address the discrimination indigenous people face. Art editor Janet Koplos, describes the series as consisting of brown, red, and white clay or terra-cotta, painted over with geometric shapes while portraying contorted bodies with detailed human like faces molded from the artist's own face. Visual arts editor Leah Ollman, adds that the whimsical facial expressions of the sculptures also portray a comedic feel, meant to depict Velarde's satire take on Latin American colonization. This series is also a commentary on women's bodies and female sexuality by displaying female body parts.

=== The Complicit Eye ===
Velarde's work, The Complicit Eye, displayed at the arts organization Taller Puertorriqueño in Philadelphia, PA (November 2018 to February 2019), was the artist's first solo painting show in the U.S. The Complicit Eye considers the female body and beauty standards in terms of patriarchal society through self portraits from the last 14 years. Taller Puertorriqueño explains how the exhibition comments on society's definition of femininity and its relation to Latina bodies, specifically in Western culture where Latin American women are expected to look a certain way. Paintings included show female bodies with different ideas of femininity, such as "pin up" style and "goddess" like features that show sculpted legs and exaggerated breast size, with the face of the artist attached.

== Exhibitions ==
Velarde has participated in a large number of solo and group exhibitions at museums and galleries in the United States and internationally. Her solo shows include HOMAGE TO MY HEART (1996), University of Michigan Museum of Art, Ann Arbor; ISICHAPUITU (1998, 2001), originating at Clay Studio, Philadelphia; PATRIMONIO (2010, 2012), originating at Barry Friedman Gallery, New York; KUKULI VELARDE (2017), Weatherspoon Art Museum, Greensboro, North Carolina; and CORPUS (2022), originating at South West School of Art, San Antonio, Texas.

== Notable works in public collections ==
- Santa Chingada: The Perfect Little Woman (1999–2000), acquired by the Smithsonian American Art Museum as part of the Renwick Gallery's 50th Anniversary Campaign.
- Atragantada (1997–2001), Museum of Fine Arts, Houston
- La Linda Nasca (2011), Art Institute of Chicago
- Daddy Likee? (2018), Pennsylvania Academy of the Fine Arts, Philadelphia

== Awards ==
She has been awarded First Place from the Virginia Groot Foundation in 2023. On 2000 Velarde received an Anonymous Was A Woman Award for sculpture and installation. In 2009 received a United States Artists Fellowship. Velarde is one of the 2015 recipients of the Guggenheim Fellowship, given out by the John Simon Guggenheim Memorial Foundation for her excellence in the fine arts. She was also the Evelyn Shapiro Foundation Fellowship recipient (1997–1998). This fellowship allowed Velarde studio space in The Clay Studio in Philadelphia and a solo exhibition. Here she displayed her exhibition Isichapuitu, which consisted of Pre-Columbian inspired ceramic pieces that told an old Peruvian folk tale about the resurrection of a female spirit.

== Publications ==
- Corpus: Kukuli Velarde. Halsey Institute. 2022.
- Patrimonio : Kukuli Velarde, 2013
- Plunder Me Baby: An Installation, 2007
- "Doug Herren: The Strength of Silence",Ceramic Monthly, 2002
- Kukuli Velarde : Cántaros de Vida (The Isichapuita Series), 2002
- "Isichapuitu",Ceramics Monthly, 1998
- Heresies, 1993
- Kukuli, 1977

== Bibliography ==
- Hernandez, Larrea and Eduardo, Manuel (2019). "La cerámica como medio de expresión en el arte contemporáneo", Pontificia Universidad Católica del Perú (PUCP)
- Trever, Lisa (2019). "Pre-Columbian Art History in the Age of the Wall".
- Eddy, Jordan (2017). "'Plunder Me Baby' at Peter's Projects", Art Itd.
- Mathieu, Paul (2003). Sex Pots: Eroticism in Ceramics, Rutgers University Press.
- Ceramics, Art and Perception (2000)
- Henneberger, Melinda (1994). "ART; Redefining 'Immigrant' In the Bronx", The New York Times
- Vargas, Kathy et al.. (1993). Intimate Lives : Work by Ten Contemporary Latina Artists.
