= Courtney Bryan (composer) =

American composer and pianist

- Born: 1982 or 1983 (age 43–44); New Orleans, Louisiana, US
- Awards: Alpert Award in the Arts (2018); Rome Prize (2019); MacArthur Fellowship (2023)

Academic background
- Education: Oberlin College (BM); Rutgers University (MM); Columbia University (DMA)
- Doctoral advisor: George Lewis
- Musical career
- Instrument: Piano
- Website: www.courtneybryan.com

Courtney Bryan is an American composer and pianist whose work combines influences from jazz and gospel traditions.

== Early life and education ==
Bryan was born in New Orleans, Louisiana. She obtained her Bachelor of Music from Oberlin College (2004), her Master of Music from Rutgers University (2007), and a Doctor of Musical Arts from Columbia University (2014), where her advisor was composer and trombonist George Lewis.

== Career ==
Known for her work as a composer who fuses Western classical, gospel, jazz and other elements of the American canon, Bryan has been commissioned to compose works for orchestra, chamber ensemble and opera, including "Dreaming (Freedom Sounds)," which was performed by the International Contemporary Ensemble at the Kaufman Music Center in New York; "Yet Unheard" for soprano, chorus, and orchestra, commissioned by the Dream Unfinished; and Opera Philadelphia's production of "Suddenly Last Summer," the Tennessee Williams one-act.

Bryan is an assistant professor in the Newcomb College department of music at Tulane University, where she serves as Albert and Linda Mintz Professor of Music. Additionally, she serves as composer-in-residence for the Jacksonville Symphony.

In 2025, with funding from the Mellon Foundation, Bryan and Dr. Robert O'Meally co-founded the Jazz Generations Initiative, a project of the Jazz Foundation of America, that presents programs in New York and New Orleans dedicated to fostering creative futures in jazz scholarship and performance, specifically by rooting the music in community settings.

== Awards ==
- 2018: Alpert Awards in the Arts.
- 2018: Hermitage Fellow
- 2019: Bard College Freehand Fellow
- 2019-20: Samuel Barber Rome Prize in musical composition.
- 2020: United States Artists Fellowship
- 2020-21: Civitella Ranieri Fellowship
- 2023: MacArthur Fellow

== Recordings ==
- Quest for Freedom (2007)
- This Little Light of Mine (2010)
- DREAMING (Freedom Sounds) (2023)
