= Dawn Nichols Walden =

American basket maker

- Born: 1949; Vulcan, Michigan
- Education: Ferris State University
- Known for: Basket weaving

Dawn Nichols Walden (b. 1949, Vulcan, Michigan) is an artist known for her basketry and fiber art. She studied at Ferris State University. In 2014 her work was included in the exhibition Elementals: Women Sculpting Animism at the Cavin-Morris Gallery in New York City. In 2016 her work was included in the exhibition Woven: The Art of Contemporary Native Basketry at Clark College. It was curated in collaboration with the I.M.N.D.N. Exhibition Series. In 2017 her work was included in the exhibition Rooted, Revived, Reinvented: Basketry in America at the Lauren Rogers Museum of Art. The show traveled to the Houston Center for Contemporary Craft. In 2018 she received a United States Artists Fellowship.

Her work, Random Order XIII, was acquired by the Smithsonian American Art Museum as part of the Renwick Gallery's 50th Anniversary Campaign.
