= Viveca Vázquez =

Puerto Rican dance choreographer and professor

Viveca Vázquez is a Puerto Rican choreographer, dancer, performance artist, and professor of contemporary dance at the University of Puerto Rico. In 1979, she co-founded Pisotón, the first experimental dance group in Puerto Rico and, shortly after, Taller de Otra Cosa, of which she became the first director. Vázquez has produced and performed experimental dance events in countries including the United States, Mexico, Venezuela, and Argentina. In 2013, Puerto Rico Museum of Contemporary Art hosted a 30-year retrospective of Vázquez's work.

== Biography ==
Born on August 15, 1950, Vázquez trained at New York University, where she explored the "geographical schizophrenia of many Puerto Rican New Yorkers by dividing her time between the island" and the United States. In 1979, she co-founded Pisotón, the first experimental dance group of Puerto Rico and, shortly after, Taller de Otra Cosa, of which she became the first director. Through the Taller de Otra Cosa company she presented her choreographic work and produced events such as Rompeforma (co-produced and co-directed with Merián Soto), a key festival in the development of the experimental dance scene in Puerto Rico. Her work examines "human relationships" and has been noted for using "fragmented movement in conceptually risky ways."

Since 1984, Vázquez has produced and performed experimental dance events in the United States, Mexico, Venezuela, and Argentina, among other places. As a teacher she has developed a pedagogical model based on body conscience and improvisation.

In 2013, Puerto Rico Museum of Contemporary Art hosted a 30-year retrospective of Vázquez's work entitled Choreography of Error: CONDUCT. For the exhibitions concluding performance, This is NOT a Viveca Vásquez piece/ Esto NO es una pieza de Viveca Vázquez, Vásquez engaged with elements from her prior work in a guided choreographed work performed throughout the museum.

In 2018, Vásquez participated as a mentor in a Northwestern University initiative to rebuild arts programs in Puerto Rico following Hurricane Maria, alongside other Puerto Rican artists including Awilda Sterling-Duprey. The initiative was funded by a $500,000 grant from the Andrew W. Mellon Foundation.

== List of works ==
- Choreography of Error: CONDUCT (2013)
- Mascando Inglés (2007)
- Maroma Nada That Ver (Composiciones Escénicas Sobre el Yo) (2006)
- Plagio (2004)
- ¡Uy! Opera of Terror (2003)
- The Película Extranjera (1999)
- Riversa (1997)
- Miss Puerto Rico o The Isla That Replaces (1996)
- Kan't Translate / Tradúcelo (1992)
- Malajuste Sui-We (1990)
- Gente o Agent Tower of Fuerza (1988)
