= Zoo Sauvage de St-Félicien =

- Interactive map of Zoo Sauvage de St-Félicien
- 48.6822909°N 72.5112247°W
- Date opened: July 17, 1960
- Location: Saint-Félicien, Quebec
- No. of animals: 1,000
- No. of species: 80
- Annual visitors: 166,105 (2008)
- Memberships: CAZA
- Website: www.zoosauvage.com

The Zoo Sauvage de St-Félicien (English: Wild Zoo of St-Félicien) is one of the largest zoos in the province of Quebec. Located in Saint-Félicien, the zoo is dedicated to wildlife conservation of the boreal climate and is managed by The Centre for Conservation of Boreal Biodiversity inc.

The Zoo Sauvage de St-Félicien is an accredited member of the Canadian Association of Zoos and Aquariums (CAZA).

== History ==
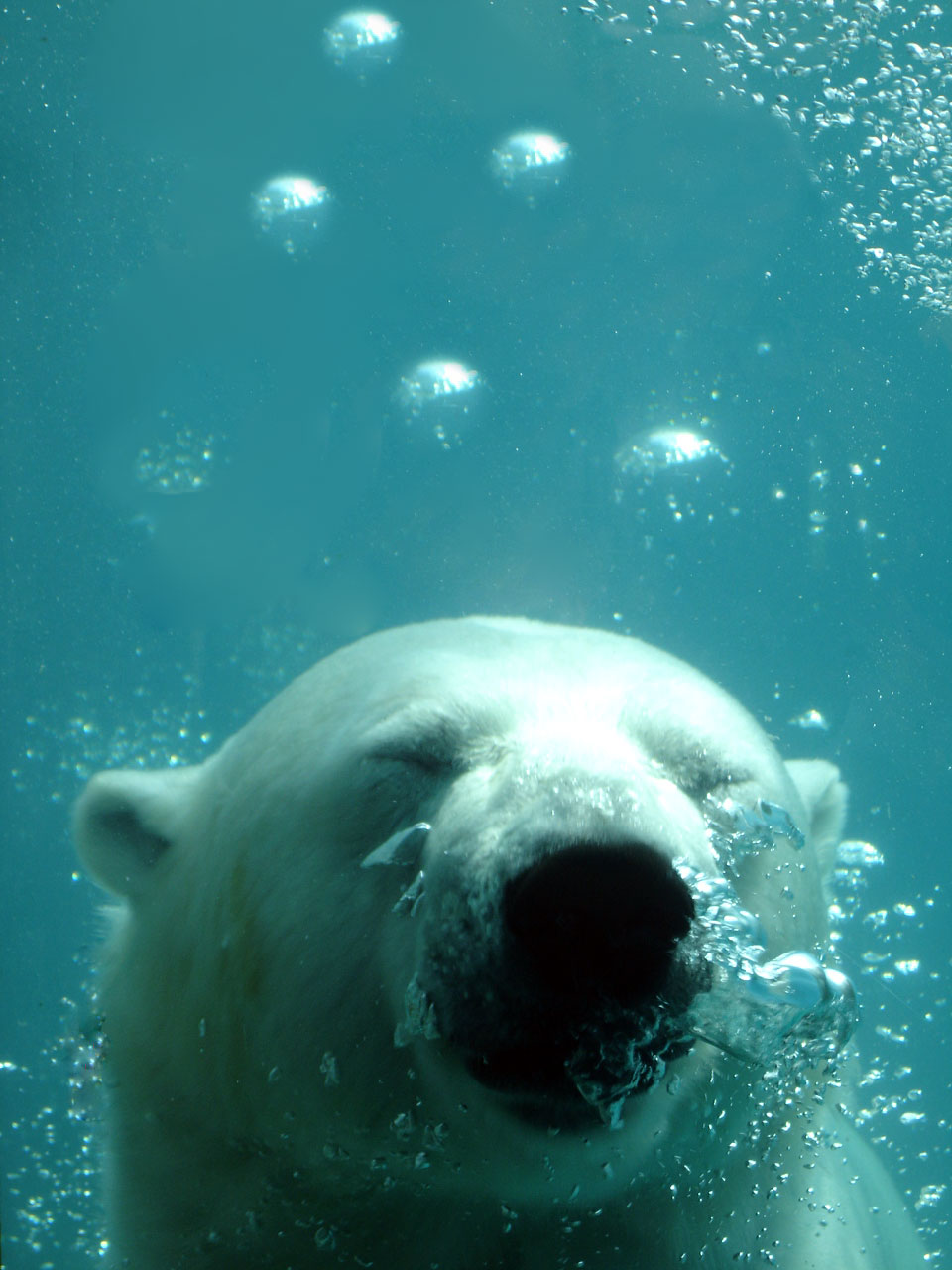
A polar bear at the zoo

=== The original zoo ===
The zoo was founded in 1960 through the initiative of Ghislain Gagnon and six others who opened it on an abandoned fox farm lent to them by Haldaige Laflamme. The zoo was set up as a traditional zoo that showcased exotic and North American animals.

On January 4, 1961, the Fondation de la Société zoologique de St-Félicien inc (English: St-Félicien Zoological Society Foundation inc.) was registered as a non-profit society. One month later the foundation purchased Île-aux-Bernard and 24 acres (9.7 ha) of land from Paul E. Gagnon for $12,000, no interest, and payments of only $500 per year.

By 1968, the zoo owned more than 44 acres (18 ha), and was home to 450 animals of 91 species. By this time, the zoo also included a restaurant, a kitchen, and a souvenir shop. Additional land was purchased in 1969, bringing the zoos holdings up to 200 acres (81 ha). Ghislain Gagnon began wondering if there was a better way to keep animals other than in cages, which resulted in the zoo being completely rethought.

=== Nature Park Trails ===
The zoo opened its Nature Park Trails on September 10, 1972. The "new zoo" covered about 74 acres (30 ha) and included a screened-in "train" with about 4 kilometres (2.5 mi) of roadway, from which visitors could observe animals that are native to Quebec, freeing the animals to larger enclosures and putting the visitors in the cages. An additional 4 square kilometres (990 acres) of land was purchased in 1974, and work began on expanding the Nature Park Trails. The expansion of the Nature Park Trails officially opened in 1978, with a new lake (Lac Montagnais) having been dug and Mount Keewatinook erected. There were now 7 kilometres (4.3 mi) of roadway in the Nature Park Trails, as well as reproductions of historic sites including the Colonist Farm, the Lumberjack Camp, the Trading Post, the Indian Campground, the Grand Trestle, and the Western Ranch.

=== The St-Félicien Zoological Society Foundation ===
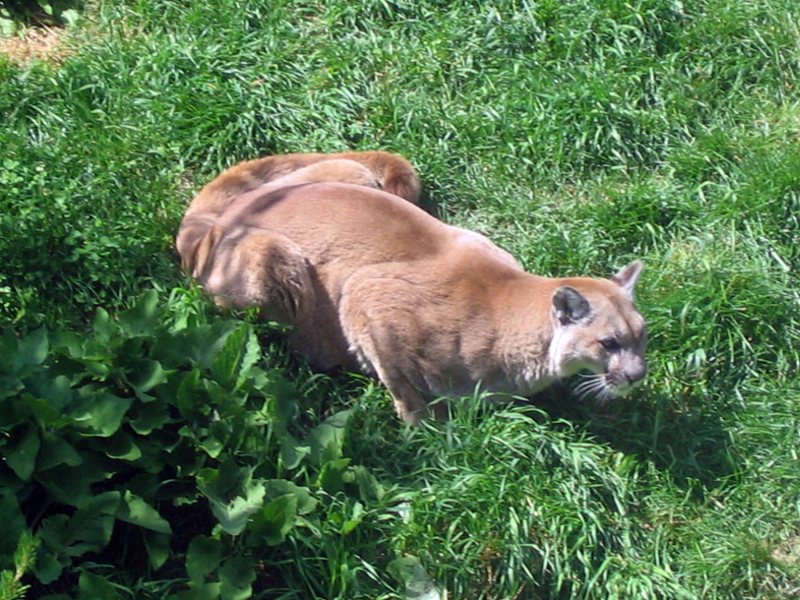
A cougar at the zoo

In the early 1980s, the zoo was financially strong and received over 300,000 visitors to its park. It became obvious through visitor comments that the demand for more educational focus at the zoo was growing, and the zoo came up with a Zoo of the Year 2000 plan, and the St-Félicien Zoological Society Foundation (French: Fondation de la Société zoologique de St-Félicien) was created in 1981 to help implement such a transformation. In 1985, work began to create habitats adapted to each animal's way of life and to remove the animals from their cages. In order to house carnivores such as their big cats, three large 24-by-30-metre (79 by 98 ft) paddocks were built. In addition, the chimpanzee habitat was constructed so the animals were contained only by a fence surrounding the water basin, in order to keep people out. The zoo also constructed new homes for giraffes, elephants, and hippopotamuses with walls and ditches replacing cages to separate visitors from the large animals.

In 1986, a work conflict caused a zoo lockout for three months and threatened to close the zoo. A re-launching committee was formed by Benoit Laprise, the mayor of St-Félicien, and in early 1987 was able to raise $1,300,000 to save the zoo from closure. The committee received help from numerous employees, citizens, municipalities, corporations, and governments. That same year, the zoo made organizational changes both at the employee and administrative levels, and the St-Félicien Zoological Society Foundation created their new mission statement with a focus on education, research, natural, and cultural patrimony, which was part of the Zoo of the Year 2000 plan. In the next two years, the zoo won many regional awards and changed its name to the Zoo Sauvage de St-Félicien in 1989, to reflect its new focus.

In the 1990s, the Wild Zoo won first prize in the Quebec Tourism Regional Awards and was awarded the National Grand Prize under the category 'Touristic Promotion,' although, the Wild Zoo would go through numerous changes during the early nineties. Ghislain Gagnon, the zoo's original founder retired on December 31, 1992, leaving Martin Laforge to manage the zoo. In September 1993, the Wild Zoo solved its problem with wastewater discharging into the rivière-aux-saumons. The Wild Zoo would use artificial swamps to treat the wastewater that came from the zoo and the campground before it entered into the rivière-aux-saumons. This ecological project was one of the first steps in sustainable development of the zoo. In order to finance the project, the zoo received subsidies, but needed to sell the campground to cover its portion of the cost.

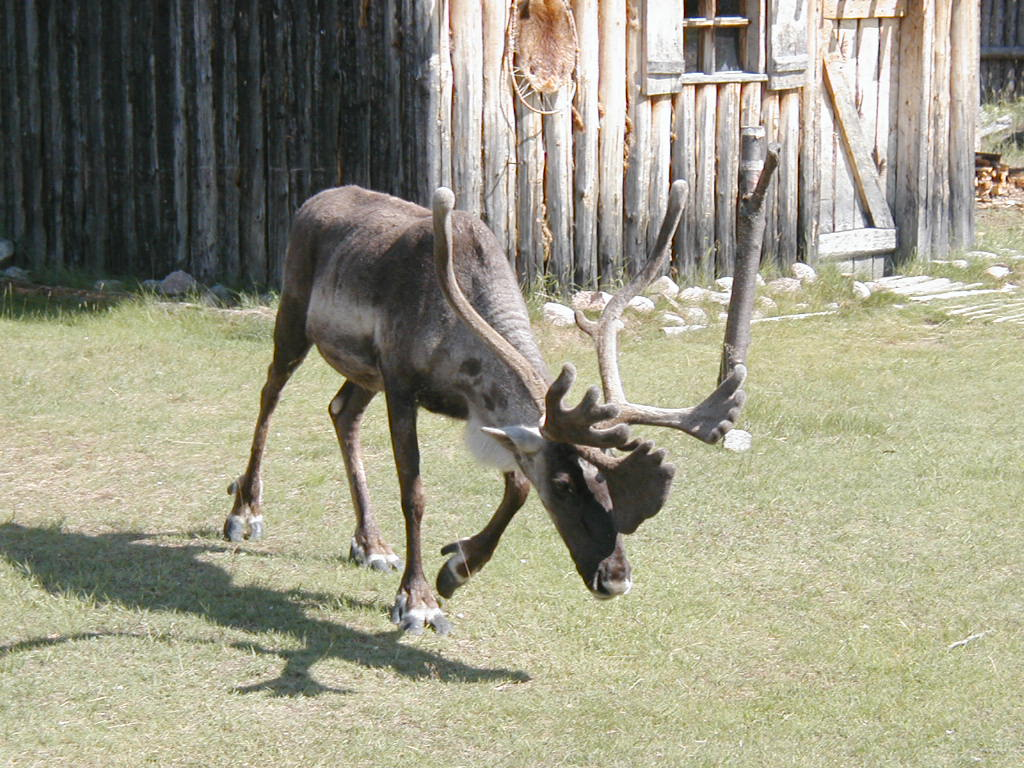
A caribou at the zoo

=== The focus on Nordic animals ===
During the same year, a committee was created to decide whether or not the Wild Zoo should abandon its exotic animal collection. The idea to make the decision came from considerations that the Wild Zoo needed its own niche to attract clients believing that visitors seeing exotic animals in other institutions needed to have an interest to come back to the Wild Zoo for its unique and specific style. Lastly, the Wild Zoo committee also believed that they were contradicting themselves between the traditional/exotic zoo (animals in cages) and the Nature Park Trails where free indigenous fauna roamed free.

The committee decided that only a huge investment would be used to restructure the traditional part of the Wild Zoo and insure its survival, as well, to make it stand out from other zoos. Through this conclusion the committee decided to remove its exotic animal collection in 1993, and shifted its focus towards animals that live in a Nordic (or subarctic and arctic) environment. By this decision, the Wild Zoo's finances were healthier due to the loss of exotic animal species that were more costly to maintain due to their nature and different environments to which they are accustomed.

The term "Nordic" refers to Scandinavia, not a climate or geographical zone. However, the term "arctic" refers to the polar regions in the "north frigid" geographical zone that includes Canada. Parts of Canada south of that are in the temperate zone. Arctic animals that live in the northern regions that include arctic (polar), subarctic (subpolar) or subarctic climate) environments. The subarctic climate (also called subpolar climate, or boreal climate) is a continental climate with long, cold (often very cold) winters, and short, warm to cool summers. Arctic animals have adapted physically and behaviorally to live in the specific habitat in the northernmost, coldest region on earth.

Major renovations done include the Île-aux-Bernard (1995), the Valley Sector (1996), and the new polar bear habitat (1997), while new constructions such as the Great Aviary, the Kids Garden, the Ghislain Gagnon Interpretation Centre were being added. Buildings that were no longer needed were turned into veterinary clinics in order to meet Quebec government and Canadian Association of Zoos and Aquariums (CAZA) standards. Through these changes, the Wild Zoo animal cohabitation was no longer restricted to the Nature Park Trails and visitors could see animals roaming freely everywhere on the site when the Wild Zoo reopened its doors in the 1997 winter season, being accessible for all four seasons, which for most Canadian zoos is impossible to do. Through these changes and innovations the Wild Zoo led the way as being a model for other Zoological Parks in Quebec and followed through with Gagnon's original vision.

=== The Centre for Conservation of Boreal Biodiversity ===
In May 2001, the Wild Zoo decided to broaden its mission statement by modifying its focus again and became the Centre for Conservation of Boreal Biodiversity (French: La Fondation du Centre de conservation de la biodiversité boréale (CCBB)).

The new CCBB wanted to increase the benefits of its organization on a local, regional and international level by following the United Nations Convention on Biological Diversity that was adopted at the 1992 Earth Summit in Rio de Janeiro. Through this change and model, the Wild Zoo shifted its efforts from Nordic towards protecting the biodiversity of the boreal forests through preservation, education, and research.

Shortly, Phase I of the plan commenced with the construction of the Borealium, which is a Visitors' Centre, in addition, to being a research, documentation, and education facility. In recent years, the Wild Zoo built new exhibits and eventually re-introduced exotic animal species to its collection that lived in the boreal environments of Asia. In 2010, the Wild Zoo introduced exotic species that live in the boreal environments of Mongolia through the remodeling of an island and opened the Mongolian habitat. At the same time, a family area with water games, and a small farm was also built.

=== Polar bear cubs ===
On December 4, 2009, the polar bear, Aisaqvak gave birth to two cubs. This was the first time a Canadian zoo experienced the birth of twin polar bears. The polar bear cubs at first were only viewed from a hidden camera inside the den and eventually at three months of age wandered outside with their mom away from public viewing. When the cubs were six months old, they made their first public appearance at the Wild Zoo in June 2010.

== Exhibits ==
- Arctic - The most popular exhibit at the Wild Zoo where visitors have an underwater view of polar bears.
- Mixed Forest - Showcases species from various forest and ocean environments. Visitors will be able to see harbor seals, river otters, raccoons, porcupines, bald eagles, great blue herons, wolverines and fishers.
- Mountain - This exhibit contains North American wildlife that would roam the mountain landscapes. Visitors can see numerous predators such as the cougar, the bobcat, the Canadian lynx, the coyote, the grizzly bear and the mule deer.
- Nature Trail Park - The first area at the zoo to have a free roaming area for animals. Visitors can observe these animals while riding inside a train with caged bars and observe large mammals such as the American bison, the moose, the northern elk, the woodland caribou, the musk ox, the black bear and white-tailed deer.
- Land of the Caribou - Visitors can observe caribou from Lac Montagnais while paddling their canoes.
- Asia - Animals in this exhibit are exotic species that live in Asian boreal environments. Visitors can observe the Amur tigers, red-crowned cranes and the Japanese macaques.
- Mongolia - Opened in 2010, this exhibit contains wildlife from Mongolia, which includes species such as the Bactrian camel, the Siberian ibex, the Przewalski's horse, and the yak.
- Mini Farm - A petting zoo where children can play, pet, and view various farm animals such as goat, Dexter cow, llama, chicken, donkey and bull frog.
