= Cannupa Hanska Luger =

Native American artist in New Mexico (born 1979)

Cannupa Hanksa Luger
- Born: 1979 (age 46–47); Standing Rock Reservation, North Dakota
- Citizenship: Three Affiliated Tribes of the Fort Berthold Reservation and United States
- Education: Institute of American Indian Arts, Santa Fe, NM
- Known for: Installation art, Sculpture, Performance art, Environmental art, Ecological art
- Awards: Burke Prize (2018), National Artist Fellowship (2016), Multicultural Fellowship Award (2015)
- Website: www.cannupahanska.com

Cannupa Hanska Luger (born 1979) is a Native American interdisciplinary artist based in New Mexico whose community-oriented artworks address Indigenous peoples, environmental justice and gender violence issues.

Luger is an enrolled citizen of the Three Affiliated Tribes of the Fort Berthold Reservation and is of Mandan, Hidatsa, Arikara, Lakota, Austrian, and Norwegian heritage.

== Early life ==
Cannupa Hanska Luger was born and raised in Fort Yates, North Dakota, on the Standing Rock Reservation.

His parents are Kathy "Elk Woman" Whitman (Fort Berthold Reservation) and Robert "Bruz" Luger. After his parents divorced, he moved with his mother and five siblings to Phoenix, Arizona, where his mother, an artist, sought a marketplace for carved stone sculptures. He spent summers on his father's ranch on the Standing Rock Reservation. The artist credits his mother and his ancestors for providing the confidence to pursue a livelihood as an artist and to develop a personal creative voice.

== Education ==
In 2011, Luger received a Bachelor of Fine Arts degree in studio arts from the Institute of American Indian Arts.

== Exhibitions and public artwork ==
Every One, 2018, by Cannupa Hanska Luger

Luger's large-scale installations, social sculptures and performances use video, sound, and a range of sculptural materials to engage in "political activism in order to communicate stories about twenty-first-century indigeneity." His work has been exhibited at the Princeton University Art Museum, Museum of Northern Arizona, the Autry Museum of the American West in Los Angeles, the Peabody Essex Museum, the Center for Visual Arts, Denver, and the Galerie Orenda in Paris, France, as well as the Museum of Arts and Design in New York City that honored him with the inaugural Burke Prize. Luger has also exhibited at the Gardiner Museum, Crystal Bridges Museum of American Art, Washington Project for the Arts, and the National Center for Civil and Human Rights, and at Art Mûr in Montreal.

Luger's installation, Every One, has been exhibited at the Museum of International Folk Art, the Gardiner Museum and the Denver Art Museum. It is composed of 4,000 individually handmade ceramic beads, collected from Native and other communities throughout the United States and Canada, to represent a collective portrait of Missing and Murdered Indigenous Women, girls, and LGBTQ victims of gender violence. Luger says of the work, "I didn't do this alone, I did it on the shoulders of giants with a pile of bones under each foot." He emphasizes the collaborative process, "It took hundreds of people to make it."

He has had numerous solo exhibitions including the 2013 show at the Museum of Contemporary Native Arts in Santa Fe, New Mexico, Cannupa Hanska Luger Stereotype: Misconceptions of the Native American; a 2016 show, Every line is a song Each shape is a story, at the National Center for Civil and Human Rights in Atlanta, Georgia; and a 2019 solo show, Every One at the Gardiner Museum, in Toronto Ontario.

Luger is well known for his Mirror Shield Project deployed at the Dakota Access Pipeline protests at Standing Rock in 2016. He designed and fabricated 100 easily made, inexpensive masonite and mirrored-vinyl shields, and posted an instructional video of the fabrication process on social media. A Minneapolis-based group made 500 additional shields with help from Jack Becker of the non-profit organization, Forecast Public Art, and Rory Wakemup from the Minneapolis organization, All My Relations Arts, who facilitated a workshop by the artist.

He organized the Lazy Stitch exhibition at the Ent Center for Contemporary Art, University of Colorado Colorado Springs, Galleries of Contemporary Art in 2018.

In 2019, his work was presented in a one-person exhibition and performance piece, A Frayed Knot/Afraid Not, and a solo exhibition, Future Ancestral Technologies: nágshibi, dealing with Indigenous science fiction, at the Emerson College Media Art Gallery.

In 2020, his work was presented in the Larger than Memory: Contemporary Art from Indigenous North America, exhibition at the Heard Museum. Also in 2020, Luger co-directed and designed costumes for Sweet Land, a site-specific, multi-perspectival opera about colonialism, that was presented at the Los Angeles State Historical Park and which was awarded Music Critics Association of North America Award for Best New Opera for 2020.

In 2021 Luger presented his debut solo exhibition in New York at Garth Greenan gallery titled New Myth, And presented the installation Something to Hold Onto addressing personal stories in relation to migration and border patrol issues at the southwest U.S. border.

From November 15, 2025 – March 8, 2026, the Joslyn Art Museum exhibited “Dripping Earth: Cannupa Hanska Luger.” The show included new works that “incorporates customary clay practices into a range of forms, from vessels to monumental sculptures.”

== Collaborations ==
While at the Institute of American Indian Arts, Luger was part of the multi-tribal Humble Art Collective in Santa Fe. Later collaborative projects include Mirror Shields, and Every One. Luger has also collaborated with the collective union of artists, Winter Count; the artist collective, Postcommodity; and the Indigenous activist collective R.I.S.E.: Radical Indigenous Survivance and Empowerment.

== Awards and honors ==
In 2015 Luger received a Multicultural Fellowship Award from the National Council on Education for the Ceramic Arts. In 2018, the artist was awarded with the first Burke Prize for American studio crafts from the Museum of Arts and Design in New York. In 2016 he received a National Artist Fellowship from the Native Arts and Cultures Foundation. In 2019 Luger was awarded a Joan Mitchell Foundation Painters & Sculptors Grant, was a 2019 Yerba Buena Center for the Arts Honoree, and in 2020, he received a Creative Capital Award, an artist fellowship from the Craft Research Fund, and A Blade of Grass Foundation fellowship for socially engaged art. In 2020 he was awarded an Artist Research Fellowship at the Smithsonian National Museum of the American Indian. In 2022 he was awarded the Guggenheim fellowship in Fine Arts.

== Public collections ==
- North America Native Museum, Zürich, Switzerland
- Denver Art Museum, Denver, CO
- IAIA Museum of Contemporary Native Arts, Santa Fe, NM
- Fred Jones Jr. Museum of Art, Norman, OK
- Yale University Art Gallery, New Haven, CT

== See also ==
- List of Native American artists
