= Linda Sikora =

Canadian ceramic artist

- Born: 1960; Saskatoon, Saskatchewan, Canada
- Known for: Ceramicist, educator
- Website: lindasikora.com

Linda Sikora (born 1960, Saskatoon, Saskatchewan) is an artist known for her ceramics. She attended the Nova Scotia College of Art and Design and the University of Minnesota. She is a professor of ceramics at Alfred University. She received a United States Artists Fellowship grant in 2020. Her work is in the collections of the Los Angeles County Museum of Art, and the Minneapolis Institute of Art Her series, Faux Wood Group, was acquired by the Smithsonian American Art Museum as part of the Renwick Gallery's 50th Anniversary Campaign.
