= Eric-Paul Riege =

American artist of Navajo descent

- Born: 1994 (age 31–32); Gallup, New Mexico
- Education: University of New Mexico
- Known for: fiber art, performance art
- Website: ericpaulriege.com

Eric-Paul Riege (Diné/Navajo) (b. 1994, Na'nízhoozhí, Gallup, New Mexico) is a fiber artist who creates installations and performance art. Riege believes his work to be an homage to generations of weavers, and considers his work as an immersion in "ceremonies, and rituals, from his past, future, and present selves."

Riege lives and works in Gallup, New Mexico.

== Early life ==
Riege, who is Diné on his mother's side and Anglo on his father's side, grew up in Gallup, New Mexico. He was influenced and inspired by his maternal great-grandmother, a weaver and activist from Burntwater, Arizona who was affected by the Bureau of Indian Affairs "livestock reduction" program in the 1930s. He learned how to sew from his mother. His father, who is originally from Ohio, is a hotel manager and an Air Force veteran.

The Navajo Times states that Riege is Naaneesht'ézhi Táchii'nii (The Charcoal Streak Division of Red Running into the Water People), born for Béésh bichʼahii" (Metal Hat People-German).

== Education ==
Riege received a BFA in 2017 in studio art and ecology, with a minor in Navajo language and linguistics from the University of New Mexico, Albuquerque.

== Exhibitions ==
Riege's work has been featured in numerous exhibitions including those at the SITElines 2018 Biennial at SITE Santa Fe, that commissioned a new work from him. He has also exhibited at the Navajo Nation Museum in Window Rock, AZ, and the National Hispanic Cultural Center in Albuquerque, NM. His work was featured in the Prospect New Orleans Biennial, Yesterday we said tomorrow and the Toronto Biennial, Canada.

In 2019, Riege had a solo museum show at the ICA Miami, titled Hólǫ́—it xistz (to exist). The show included woven sculpture, wearable art, and durational performance. A catalog was produced in conjunction with the show with texts by Szu-Han Ho. The titles of his works and exhibitions reflect his interest in language and linguistics.

jaatłoh4Ye'iitsoh [3-4] (2020) at the National Gallery of Art in 2023

In 2020, the Heard Museum in Phoenix, AZ commissioned him to produce jaatłoh4Ye'iitsoh no. 1-6 for the show Larger than Memory: Contemporary Art From Indigenous North America. In 2021 the DeCordova Sculpture Park and Museum presented a temporary installation and performance that Riege created in response to Jeffrey Gibson's monumental sculpture, Because Once You Enter My House It Becomes Our House. Riege's performance was an expression of the Diné/Navajo word Woshdee'! which translates to "come in." Riege states that: "The word is an invitation to a loved one or a stranger" to honor Gibson's title of his sculpture.

In 2021 he had a solo show at the Bockley Gallery, Minneapolis, titled (my god, YE'ii [1-2]) (jaatłoh4Ye'iitsoh [1–6]) (a loom between Me+U, dah 'iistł'ǫ́) "earring for the big god". In the same year he was featured in a group show, Make-Shift-Future, at Regan Projects, Los Angeles. Also in 2021, Riege presented a durational performance at the Montclair Art Museum as part of the Color Riot!: How Color Changed Navajo Textiles exhibition. Riege's work was featured in the multi-year project, STTLMNT: An Indigenous Digital World Wide Occupation, in Plymouth, UK, conceived by Cannupa Hanska Luger and the UK based collective, The Conscious Sisters. The project "promotes a digital occupation by Indigenous Peoples within the context of the 400 year commemorations of the Mayflower's arrival in North America."

For the 2022 Toronto Biennial of Art, he exhibited the installation, a home for Her, incorporating a collection of weavings and looms in collaboration with the women weavers in his family. Riege presented Hólǫ́llUllUHIbI [duet] for the 2022-2023 winter season at the Hammer Museum in Los Angeles. The large-scale sculptures, which are suspended from the ceiling, represent to what the artist calls "totems of memory" and are reminiscent of ornate jewelry and trees swaying in the wind. He has described his associated performances as teaching him about the correlation between weaving and the structures and systems of the human body.

=== Performance ===
Riege describes his durational performances (which can last for several hours) as a way for him to use his body as a fiber "interacting with looms, the regalia and the installation."

== Honors and awards ==
In 2019 Riege received a fellowship from the Art Matters Foundation. In 2021, Riege received a New Work Project Grant from the Harpo Foundation to produce an installation for Prospect New Orleans. In 2026, Riege was named a United States Artists (USA) Fellow.

== Collections ==
Riege's work is included in the permanent collection of the Institute of Contemporary Art, Miami, the Denver Art Museum, the Tia Collection in Santa Fe, and the Montclair Art Museum.
