= April Surgent =

American glass artist

- Born: 1982 (age 42–43); Missoula, Montana, U.S.
- Known for: glass engraving
- Website: aprilsurgent.com

April Surgent (born 1982 in Missoula, Montana) is an American glass artist. She studied at the Pilchuck Glass School and the Australian National University. In 2009 she received a Behnke Foundation Neddy Fellowship. In 2013 Surgent participated in the National Science Foundation Antarctic Artists and Writers Program. In 2016 she received a United States Artists fellowship. In 2018 Surgent work was featured in the exhibit Cameo Glass in Context: Charlotte Potter and April Surgent at the Wichita Art Museum. Her work is in the collection of the Corning Museum of Glass, and the Museum of Glass

Her piece, Wave, was acquired by the Smithsonian American Art Museum as part of the Renwick Gallery's 50th Anniversary Campaign.
