= Awilda Sterling-Duprey =

Puerto Rican artist, dancer, and choreographer

Awilda Sterling-Duprey is an artist, dancer, and choreographer, and an important figure in Puerto Rico's art scene.

== Biography ==
Awilda Sterling-Duprey was born in Barrio Obrero, Santurce, Puerto Rico.

She earned her bachelor's degree in painting from the Escuela de Artes Plásticas in 1971. She also attended the University of Puerto Rico, Río Piedras, the School of Visual Arts in New York, Pratt Institute in Brooklyn, and is currently a doctoral student in history at the Center for Advanced Studies on Puerto Rico and the Caribbean, in San Juan. She received an Experimental dance fellowship from the NEA in 1985, a Caribbean Cultural Contribution Award from the Puerto Rican Cultural Institute and Clemente Soto Vélez Cultural award in 2001 among many other awards and recognitions. She was a United States Artists Rolón Fellow in 2010.

She is a founding member of Pisotón, the first experimental dance collective in Puerto Rico, and was an artist in residence with Taller de Otra Cosa.

Her performance practice combines Afro-Caribbean dance, jazz, and modern experimental movement. Sterling-Duprey has created and performed experimental dance works throughout New York City, Europe, Latin America, and the Caribbean. She currently teaches at Escuela de Artes Plásticas in San Juan, Puerto Rico.

== Career ==
=== Blindfolded, 2020-22 ===
First performed in 2020, Awilda Sterling-Duprey's Blindfolded is most known for being performed at the 2022 Whitney Biennial: “Quiet as It’s Kept." To perform Blindfolded, Sterling-Duprey blindfolds herself, then using chalk, she draws on a black surface in response to jazz music. The music she chose to listen to during her 2022 performance were pieces performed by saxophonist Miguel Zenón, who is also a Puerto Rican artist. She listened to his album Sonero: The Music of Ismael Rivera, and finished her performance with the piece "Las Caras Lindas."

=== Lack's Criticality, 2018-23 ===
Sterling-Duprey's piece Lack's Criticality was created in response to the destruction caused by Hurricane Maria, and the piece was originally commissioned by Temple University and their dance/theater department. The piece was last performed at the Whitney Museum of American Art during an exhibition exploring how artists have responded to the storm that devastated Puerto Rico in 2017. The performance was meant to capture the feelings and emotions of the Puerto Rican citizens after the hurricane hit. To achieve this, Sterling-Duprey borrowed heavily from the Yoruba dance traditions, as well as it took spiritual and religious inspirations from the Yoruba. Sterling-Duprey was accompanied in her performance by three Yoruban batá drummers: Jainardo Batista, Rafael Monteagudo and Román Diaz.

== Bibliography ==
1. Alvarez, Jose. “Awilda Sterling-Duprey: (Un)Drawing the Continent Blindfolded.” C& AMÉRICA LATINA, 27 July 2022, https://amlatina.contemporaryand.com/editorial/awilda-sterling-duprey-undrawing-the-continent-blindfolded/.

- An interview with Awilda Sterling Duprey in which she discusses some of her influences, as well as her award-winning piece Blindfolded.

2. Seibert, Brian. “Review: Awilda Sterling-Duprey Summons Dancing Forces of Nature.” The New York Times, The New York Times, 5 Mar. 2023, https://www.nytimes.com/2023/03/05/arts/dance/review-awilda-sterling-duprey-lacks-criticality.html.

- Review of Sterling-Duprey's “Lack’s Criticality,” which came about after Hurricane Maria hit Puerto Rico.

3. Echevarría, Luis. “Una Pregunta Más... a Awilda Sterling-Duprey.” El Adoquín Times, 18 Jan. 2022, https://www.eladoquintimes.com/2022/01/03/una-pregunta-mas-a-awilda-sterling-duprey/.

- A cultural newspaper in Puerto Rico interviews Awilda Sterling-Duprey and asks her about blindfolded, racial discrimination, and her thoughts about the future of experimental art.

4. Reyes Franco, Marina. “Atlas San Juan: Afro-Caribbean Connection.” ARTnews.com, ARTnews.com, 24 June 2022, https://www.artnews.com/art-in-america/columns/san-juan-afro-caribbean-63611/.

- A news network for artists describes the Afro–Puerto Rican identity, using various artists for examples. When describing Awilda Sterling-Duprey, they use her piece “Transparente desnudez” (Transparent Nudity), as a focus point.

5. La Sangre Llama - Diposit.eina.cat. https://diposit.eina.cat/bitstream/handle/20.500.12082/979/2018_2019_Markovic_Marcia.pdf. 2018.

- An essay which researches Black women's representation in art, and discusses Sterling-Duprey's religious and spiritual influences.

6. “Lacks Criticality.” Whitney Museum of American Art, https://whitney.org/events/lacks-criticality.

- Description and details of the 2023 performance of Lack's Criticality, which was performed at the Whitney Museum of American Art.
