= Raheleh Filsoofi =

Iranian and American artist, educator (born 1975)

- راحله ت. فیلسوفی
- Born: 1975 (age 50–51); Tehran, Pahlavi Iran
- Education: Al-Zahra University (BFA), Florida Atlantic University (MFA)
- Occupations: Visual artist, educator
- Known for: Ceramics, sound art, performance art, installation art
- Website: www.rahelehfilsoofi.com

Raheleh Filsoofi (born 1975) is an Iranian and American interdisciplinary artist, and educator. Her work explores migration, land, material memory, and cultural identity through ceramics, sound art, performance art, and installation art. She is an assistant professor of ceramics in the Department of Art at Vanderbilt University, where she has taught since 2020, and holds a secondary faculty appointment at Vanderbilt’s Blair School of Music. Her work has been widely reviewed in art publications and exhibited at museums and cultural institutions across the United States.

== Early life and education ==
Filsoofi was born in 1975, and raised in Tehran, Pahlavi Iran, where she completed her early education. Her formative years were shaped by Iranian visual culture, including Islamic architecture, tilework traditions, and Sufi philosophy, which later became enduring points of reference in her artistic practice.

In 2002, she left Iran, spending a year in Canada, before relocating to the United States.

She received a Bachelor of Fine Arts degree with a specialization in ceramics from Alzahra University in Tehran in 1998. She later earned a Master of Fine Arts in visual arts from Florida Atlantic University in Boca Raton, Florida, in 2014.

== Career ==
Filsoofi’s interdisciplinary practice combines clay, performance, sound, video, and installation to examine displacement, migration, and the politics of land and belonging. Her work frequently incorporates clay and soil collected from specific geographic locations, which she processes and transforms into vessels, prints, and installation forms.

In 2023, Filsoofi developed a clay- and dust-based printing and painting process she later named argillotype. The technique involves collecting soil from various locations in the United States, isolating the clay content, and using it to print and paint poems and images. The process became a central component of her multimedia practice and was first realized in projects such as At the Edge of Arrival and (Un)Grounded.

== Exhibitions ==
(Un)Grounded was presented at the Telfair Museums in Savannah, Georgia, in 2025. The exhibition was informed by Filsoofi’s travels across the southeastern United States, during which she collected soil from multiple locations and transformed it into ceramic vessels, sound works, and installations responding to regional histories of land, labor, and craft.

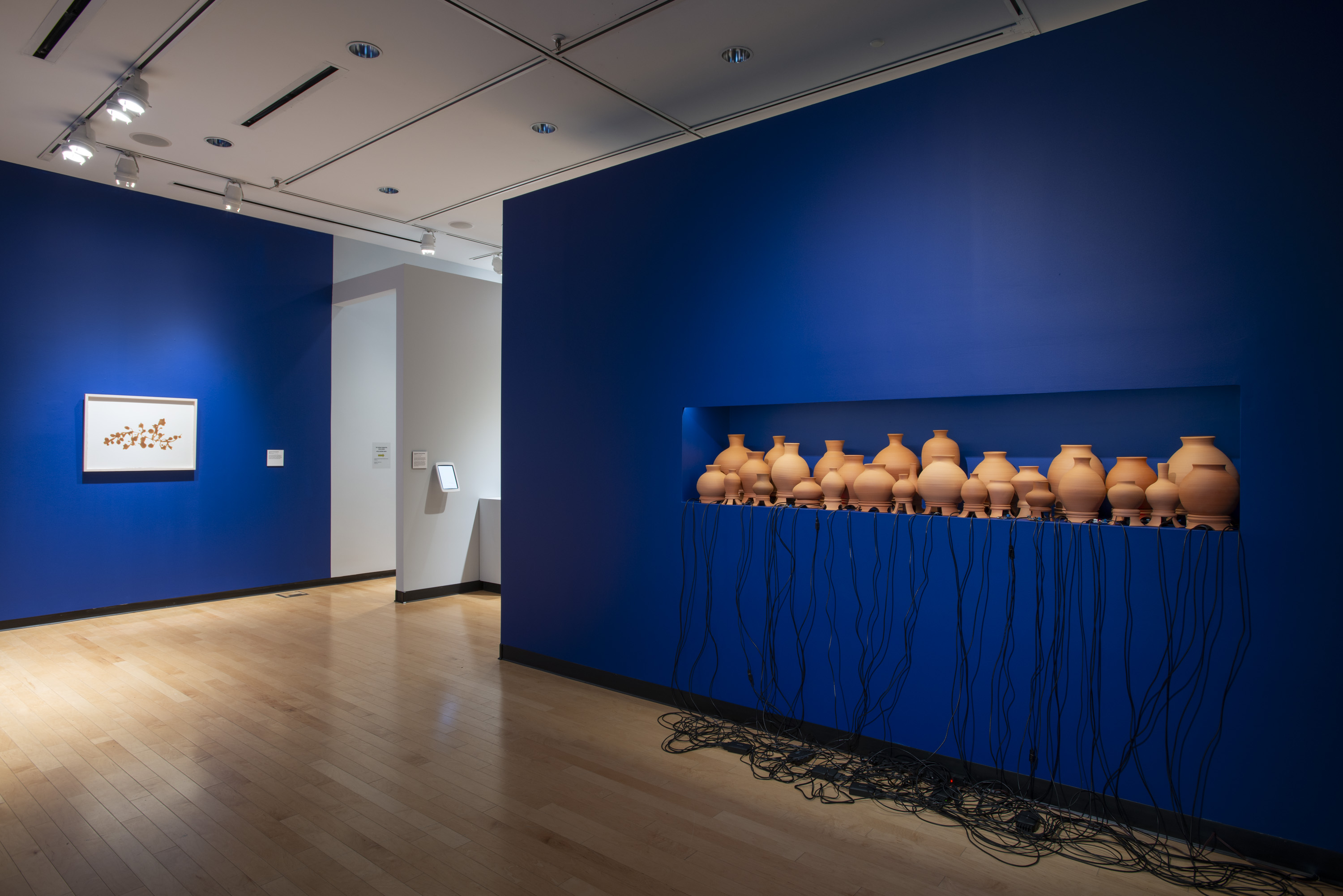
At the Edge of Arrival

In 2025, At the Edge of Arrival was exhibited at the Halsey Institute of Contemporary Art in Charleston, South Carolina. The exhibition presented argillotypes alongside sound, video, and sculptural elements, reflecting Filsoofi’s navigation of the American South as a Middle Eastern immigrant and placing personal movement in dialogue with historical ceramic traditions.

In 2025, Raheleh Filsoofi presented the solo exhibition Deep Listening at the Ismaili Center in Houston, Texas. Organized as part of the Center’s inaugural exhibition program, the exhibition brought together two projects by Filsoofi, Imagined Boundaries and ShahTár. Imagined Boundaries examined perception and visual attention through ceramic and sculptural forms, while ShahTár, created in collaboration with Reza Filsoofi, was conceived as a performative instrument activated through sound. On view from December 13, 2025, through June 2026, the exhibition addressed themes of silence, listening, and cultural dialogue through both still and performative works.

== Academic appointments ==
Since 2020, Filsoofi has served as assistant professor of Ceramics in the Department of Art at Vanderbilt University in Nashville, Tennessee. In 2023, she was appointed to a secondary faculty role at Vanderbilt’s Blair School of Music, reflecting her interdisciplinary engagement with sound and performance.

== Community work and advocacy ==
Filsoofi is the co-founder of the Nashville Immigrant and Refugee Music and Art Project (NIRMA), established in 2024 with multi-instrumentalist Reza Filsoofi. The initiative supports immigrant and refugee artists in Middle Tennessee through performances, workshops, exhibitions, and collaborative programming that emphasizes art and music as cross-cultural forms of communication.

NIRMA programming has included cultural events at the Frist Art Museum, workshops with the Nashville International Center for Empowerment, and performances at venues including the Parthenon and the Curb Center at Vanderbilt University. She also works with the organization Nashville International Center for Empowerment (NICE).

== Awards and honors ==
- Southern Prize Tennessee State Fellowship (2021)
- 1858 Contemporary Southern Art Award (2022)
- Joan Mitchell Fellowship Award (2023)
- NCECA Innovator Award (2025)
- United States Artists (USA) Fellowship Award (2026)
