= Art Mûr =

Private art gallery located in Canada

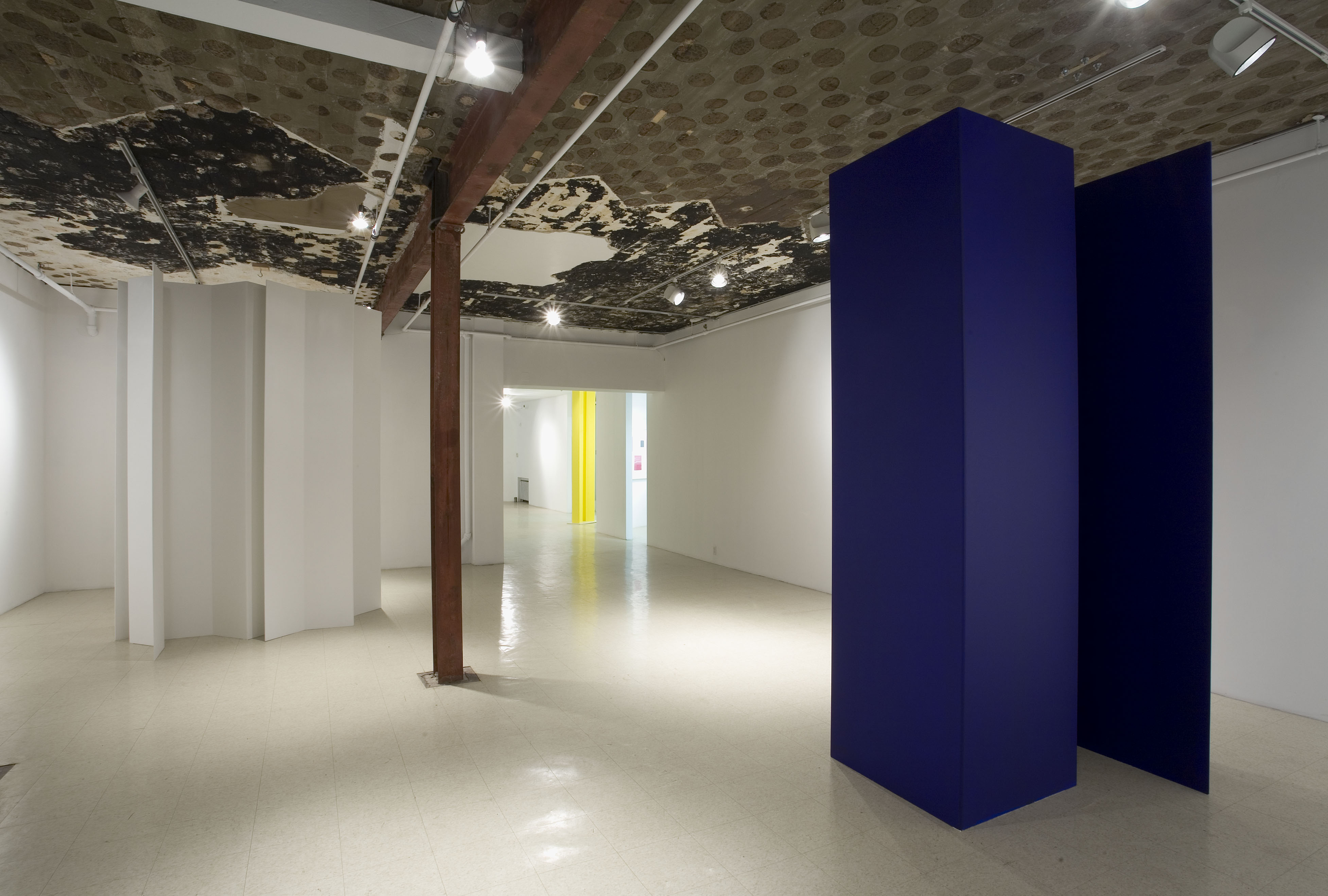
- Claude Tousignant, Modulateur de lumière, 2005, Installation view at Art Mûr
- Established: 1996
- Location: Montreal, Quebec, Canada
- Coordinates: 45.53315°N 73.596843°W
- Visitors: 10,000
- Directors: Rhéal Olivier Lanthier & François St-Jacques
- Public transit access: Montreal Metro
- Website: http://www.artmur.com

Art Mûr is a private contemporary art gallery in Montreal, Quebec, Canada.

== History ==
Founded in 1996 by Rhéal Olivier Lanthier & François St-Jacques, Art Mur was originally located on Notre-Dame Street, in the Saint-Henri neighborhood of Montreal. Since 2002, the gallery has been situated at 5826 Saint Hubert Street in the borough of Rosemont–La Petite-Patrie. Art Mûr is a member of The Contemporary Art Galleries Association (AGAC).

== Art Mûr Publications ==
- Mysterious Holly King: Edging Towards the Mysterious (2015)
- Cal Lane: Sweet Crude (2009)
- Shayne Dark: Into the Blue (2008)

== Other achievements and mentions ==
The 10th anniversary of Art Mûr was featured in the Winter 2006-07 edition of Vie des Arts (vol. 50, n°205) In 2003, the gallery was named "Best New Space" by Isa Tousignant, the journalist for the Hour (Montreal), and François St-Jacques et Rhéal Olivier Lanthier were awarded "Best gallery directors" by Christine Redfern, the journalist for the Montreal Mirror.
