= Eiteljorg Museum of American Indians and Western Art =

Art museum in Indianapolis, Indiana, US

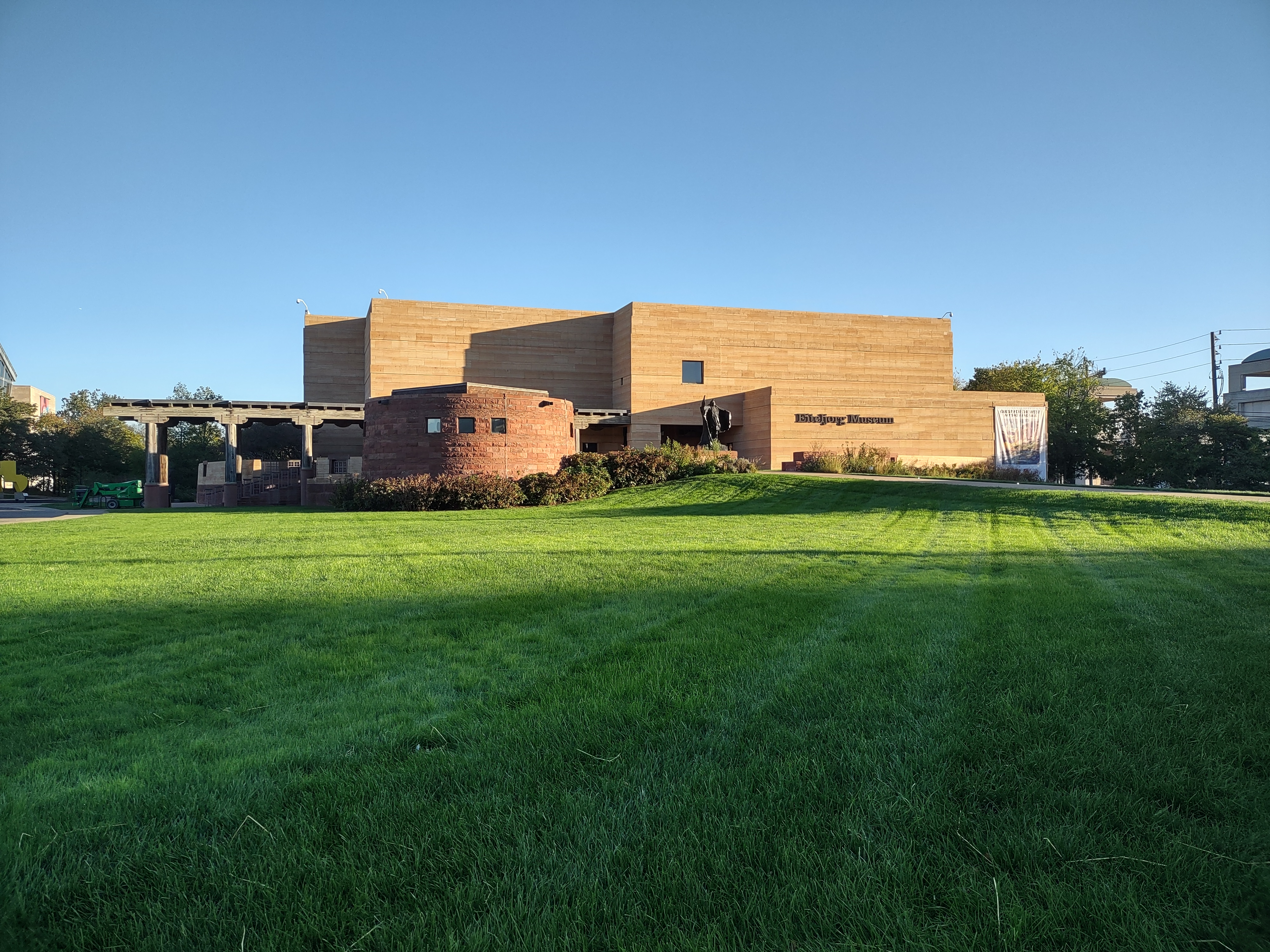
- Front view of the museum in 2024
- Established: 1989; 37 years ago
- Location: White River State Park, Indianapolis, Indiana, U.S.
- Coordinates: 39°46′06″N 86°10′04″W
- Type: Art museum
- Visitors: 114,488 (2019)
- Director: Kathryn Haigh
- Curator: Elisa Phelps
- Public transit access: 8
- Website: www.eiteljorg.org

The Eiteljorg Museum of American Indians and Western Art is an art museum in downtown Indianapolis, Indiana, United States. The Eiteljorg houses an extensive collection of visual arts by indigenous peoples of the Americas as well as Western American paintings and sculptures collected by businessman and philanthropist Harrison Eiteljorg (1903–1997). The museum houses one of the finest collections of Native contemporary art in the world.

== Museum ==
The museum is located in Indianapolis's White River State Park, which is also home to the neighboring Indiana State Museum and Military Park, among other attractions. The museum offers free parking to its visitors in the park's underground parking garage.

The Gund Gallery has an appreciable collection of paintings and bronzes by Frederic Remington and Charles Russell. It also has paintings by: George Winter, Thomas Hill, Albert Bierstadt, Charles King, and Olaf Seltzer. In another room, there is a large collection of paintings by New Mexico-associated painters, such as: Joseph Henry Sharp, William Victor Higgins, Ernest L. Blumenschein ("Penitentes"), John French Sloan, and Georgia O'Keeffe (“Taos Pueblo”).

In June 2005, the museum opened an extensive expansion that doubled the public space of the museum by adding three new galleries, the Sky City Café, an education center, outdoor gardens, and event space. The new galleries include two galleries dedicated to the museum's extensive contemporary art collection. The collection includes works by T. C. Cannon, Kay WalkingStick, Andy Warhol, and many more. The other gallery added in the expansion is the Gund Gallery of Western Art. This gallery is dedicated to the 57-piece collection of traditional Western art donated to the museum by the George Gund Family.

In 2021, a six-person panel of American Institute of Architects (AIA) Indianapolis members identified the museum among the ten most "architecturally significant" buildings completed in the city since World War II.

== Fellowship ==
The museum offers the prestigious Eiteljorg Contemporary Art Fellowship (formerly called the Eiteljorg Fellowship for Native American Fine Art) biennially to recognize some of the most innovative and influential contemporary Native artists active today. Eiteljorg fellows include:

- Sonny Assu (Ligwilda’xw Kwakwaka’wakw) installation artist, painter (2021)
- Natalie Ball (Klamath Tribes/Modoc textile and installation artist (2023)
- Rick Bartow (Wiyot, 1946–2016), painter and mixed media artist (2001)
- Catherine Blackburn, English River Dene fashion designer, installation artist, mixed media artist (2021)
- Julie Buffalohead, Ponca Tribe of Oklahoma, painter (2013)
- Sean Chandler (Aaniiih), drawing artist (2023)
- Corky Clairmont, Salish-Kootenai printmaker and installation artist (2003)
- Gerald Clarke, Cahuilla Band sculptor (2007)
- Hannah Claus, Mohawk interdisciplinary artist (2019)
- Dana Claxton, Hunkpapa Lakota performance and installation artist (2007)
- Lorenzo Clayton, Navajo printmaker (1999)
- Ruth Cuthand, Plains Cree printmaker, painter, photographer (2023)
- Jim Denomie (Lac Court Oreilles Ojibwe, 1955–2022), painter (2009)
- Bonnie Devine, Serpent River First Nation Ojibwa installation artist, performance artist, sculptor (2011)
- Demian DinéYazhi´, Diné, photographer (2019)
- Mercedes Dorame (self-identified Tongva-descent), photographer, installation artist (2023)
- Joe Feddersen, Colville Confederated Tribes (Okanagan/Sinixt) printmaker, glass artist, basket weaver (2001)
- Anita Fields, Osage/Muscogee ceramic artist, textile artist (2021)
- Harry Fonseca (Shingle Springs Maidu/Nisenan, 1946–2006), painter (2005)
- Skawennati Fragnito, Mohawk New Media artist (2011)
- Nicholas Galanin, Tlingit/Unangax installation artist (2013)
- Jeffrey Gibson, Mississippi Band Choctaw/Cherokee painter and installation artist (2009)
- Shan Goshorn (Eastern Band Cherokee, 1957–2018), basketweaver, mixed media, photographer (2013)
- Raven Halfmoon (Caddo/Choctaw/Delaware (2023)
- Faye Heavyshield, Kainai installation artist (2009)
- Luzene Hill, Eastern Band Cherokee installation artist (2015)
- John Hoover (Aleut, 1919–2011), sculptor (2005)
- Robert Houle, Saulteaux painter (2003)
- Allan Houser (Chiricahua Apache, 1914–1994) sculptor (2001)
- Sonya Kelliher-Combs, Iñupiaq/Athabascan painter and sculptor (2007)
- Matthew Kirk, Diné mixed-media artist (2019)
- Athena LaTocha, Hunkpapa Lakota/Ojibwe-descent painter (2021)
- James Lavadour, Walla Walla painter (2005)
- Rita Letendre (Abenaki-descent, 1928–2021), painter (2019)
- Truman Lowe (Ho-Chunk, 1944–2019) conceptual artist and curator (1999)
- James Luna (Puyukitchum, Ipai, and Mexican-American, 1950–2018), performance artist (2007)
- Brenda Mallory, Cherokee Nation sculptor (2015)
- Teresa Marshall, Mi'kmaq conceptual artist (2001)
- Mario Martinez, Pascua Yaqui painter
- Meryl McMaster, Plains Cree photographer (2013)
- Larry McNeil, Tlingit/Nisga'a photographer (2007)
- Da-ka-xeen Mehner, Tlingit/Nisga'a sculptor, installation artist, photographer
- Alan Michelson, Mohawk (2011)
- George Morrison, Grand Portage Ojibwe (1919–2000) abstract expressionist painter and sculptor (1999)
- Nadia Myre, Algonquin multidisciplinary artist (2003)
- Nora Naranjo Morse, Santa Clara Pueblo ceramicist (2003)
- Marianne Nicolson, PhD, Kwakwaka’wakw photographer and painter (1999)
- Shelley Niro, Six Nations of the Grand River Mohawk photographer, beader, filmmaker, installation artist (2001)
- Edward Poitras, Gordon First Nation painter (2009)
- Wendy Red Star, Crow installation artist (2009)
- Rick Rivet, Sahtu/Métis mixed media painter (1999)
- Tanis Maria S'eiltin, Tlingit sculptor and installation artist (2005)
- Susie Silook, Siberian Yupik/Iñupiaq carver and sculptor (2001)
- Duane Slick, Sac and Fox Tribe of the Mississippi in Iowa painter (2011)
- Jaune Quick-to-See Smith, Salish-Kootenai, Métis, Shoshone-Bannock printmaker, collage, mixed media artist (1999)
- C. Maxx Stevens, Seminole Nation sculptor and installation artist (2005)
- Hulleah Tsinhnahjinnie, Navajo/Seminole/Muscogee photographer (2003)
- Anna Tsouhlarakis, Navajo/Muscogee sculptor, video artist, photographer (2011)
- Kay WalkingStick, Cherokee Nation painter (2003)
- Marie Watt, Seneca Nation installation artist and printmaker (2005)
- Dyani White Hawk, Sicangu Lakota painter (2019)
- Holly Wilson, Delaware Nation/Cherokee sculptor (2015)
- Will Wilson, Navajo photographer (2007)
- Steven J. Yazzie, Navajo/Laguna Pueblo painter, video artist (2021)
- Lawrence Paul Yuxweluptun (Coast Salish/Okanagan, painter (2013)

== See also ==
- List of museums in Indiana
- List of attractions and events in Indianapolis
