= Anna Tsouhlarakis =

Native American artist

- Born: 1977 (age 48–49)
- Education: Dartmouth College (BFA, 1999), Yale University (MFA, 2002)
- Style: installation art, performance art, video art
- Father: Naveek
- Website: naveeks.com

Anna Tsouhlarakis is a Native American artist who creates installation, video, and performance art. She is an enrolled citizen of the Navajo Nation and of Muscogee Creek and Greek descent. Her work has been described as breaking stereotypes surrounding Native Americans and provoking thought, rather than focusing solely on aesthetics. Tsouhlarakis wants to redefine what Native American art means and its many possibilities. She also works at the University of Colorado Boulder as an assistant professor.

== Biography ==
=== Early life ===
Anna Tsouhlarakis was born in 1977 in Lawrence, Kansas. She was raised by her father and her grandmother. She spent most of her childhood in Kansas and New Mexico until she permanently moved to New Mexico. Growing up, Tsouhlarakis was surrounded by artists and learned traditional work such as beading and woodworking. Her father, Naveek, was a contractor before becoming a full-time artist as a jeweler. She began making art by using scraps of copper or wood that her father would bring back. Other artists also helped guide her in different types of media and on what it is like to be a Native American contemporary artist. James Luna and other Native artists inspired her work through videos and installations. She then found her footing in the media she preferred to use which was not as traditional. Tsouhlarakis used to compete in powwow dances when she was young and had a traditional wedding. Art critics, such as Mindy Besaw, have stated that by doing the contrary of what is expected of Native artists, Tsouhlarakis' artworks help break stereotypes that confine many Native artists to do what is seen as traditional art. For example, this could be seen in the 2004 video, Let's Dance!

=== Education ===
In 1999, Tsouhlarakis received a Bachelor of Arts degree from Dartmouth College. In 2002, she received her Masters of Fine Arts degree from Yale University. She also attended American University in Italy and New York Studio School of Drawing, Painting, and Sculpture.

=== Artist residencies ===
- Colorado College. Colorado Springs, CO. August 2019 - May 2020.
- Social engagement art resident, April 2020 at the IAIA Museum of Contemporary Native Arts.
- 2002, Skowhegan School of Painting and Sculpture. Skowhegan, ME.

== Personal life and recent activity ==
Tsouhlarakis currently resides in Washington, D.C., with her husband and three children.

She is currently working on many projects, exhibitions, residencies, and works that can be found on her website or social media. One of them is The Native Guide Project, in which she uses billboards and social media to share feedback from her viewers.

=== Collections ===
- Known Paths, March 2, 2020 - March 5, 2020, at Haverford College in Pennsylvania.
- Art for a New Understanding, October 12 and 14, 2018 at Crystal Bridges.
- Art for a New Understanding, January 2019 - July 2019 at the IAIA.

== Select artwork ==
=== Performance/video ===
==== Legends, 2005 ====
In Legends, Tsouhlarakis uses duct tape to create this series as both photography and performance art. The duct tape covers the woman, each photo covering different amounts of her body. Although removing duct tape from the skin is a painful task, the woman remains calm throughout the series. Jennifer McNutt has stated that although the significance behind this series could be hard to understand Tsouhlarakis wants the viewer to come up with their interpretation of the Legends series.

==== Intervals of Pretense, 2011 ====
Tsouhlarakis drew inspiration from Einstein's theories about time and her own cultures beliefs to create the 2011 video installation Intervals of Pretense, as she noted that there were differences between what she was being exposed to between school and home. Throughout the video, hands are continuously moving, which McNutt states create the illusion of creating something when they are not and brings up the question of whether the product or process is most important. She further states that the video includes the past, present, and future all at once, which goes back to the ideas of time. It is a thirty-six channel digital video that runs for three minutes.

==== Let's Dance!, 2004 ====
Her 2004 video, Let's Dance! runs for fifteen minutes and thirty seconds. In the video, Tsouhlarakis is taught thirty dances such as the salsa and Harlem Shake, each from a new person with a different background. The video is meant to send a message about inclusion and that nothing is attached to a specific culture, as Natives can do non-Native dances as well. It also challenges expectations attached to what Native art is believed to be.

=== Sculpture/installation ===
==== Clash of the Titans, 2007 ====
In her 2007 exhibition, Clash of the Titans, Tsouhlarakis was inspired by Gabriel Garcia Marquez and greek mythology.

==== In Other Words: A Native Primer, 2013 ====
In her 2013 installation, In Other Words: A Native Primer, Tsouhlarakis created this installation by collecting survey responses of what it is like to live in Washington D.C. as a Native American. She gathered responses from various types of Natives some were from the Navajo and the Iroquois tribes. The installation was made from vinyl signage, found wood, screws, and wire.

=== Photography ===
==== Aesthetically Speaking, 2011 ====
In her 2011 photography series, Aesthetically Speaking, Tsouhlarakis brings up the concept of miscommunication and comprehension. Per McNutt, by using patterns that are associated with Native cultures, she opens up a conversation with the viewer to come up with their solution to misinterpretation and lack of real knowledge about Native Americans.

==== Untitled (silhouettes), 2016 ====
In her 2016 photography series, Untitled, Tsouhlarakis created these photographs to protest the Dakota Access Pipeline.

== Exhibitions ==
=== Solo exhibitions ===
- 2016 She Made for Her, Neubauer Collegium Gallery. The University of Chicago. Chicago, IL.
- 2013 In Other Words: A Native Primer, Flashpoint Galleria. Washington, DC.

=== Group exhibitions ===
- January 19, 2020.Yua: Henri Matisse and the Inner Arctic Spirit. Steele Auditorium. Heard Museum.
- 2019–2020 Art for a New Understanding. Nasher Museum of Art at Duke University.
- Museum of Contemporary Native Arts.
  - 2019 Art for a New Understanding. Santa Fe, NM.
  - 2020 Residency
- 2018 Crystal Bridges Museum of American Art.
- 2016 Ward 12, Halcyon House. Washington, DC.
- 2012 George Gustav Heye Center.
- Smithsonian's National Museum of the American Indian.
  - 2012 We are Here. New York, NY.
  - 2008 Remix: New Modernities in a post-Indian world, New York.
- 2009 Remix: New Modernities in a post-Indian world, New York. Art Gallery of Ontario in Toronto.
- Art Mural in Montreal.
- Rush Arts in New York.

== Select awards and fellowships ==
=== Awards ===
- R.C. Gorman Award (1995)
- Indigenous Peoples Award (2000)
- Di Modolo Award (2001)

=== Fellowships ===
- 2002 Skowhegan School of Painting and Sculpture Fellowship
- Yale University, Skowhegan Fellowship
- 2011 Eiteljorg Contemporary Art Fellowship
- 2015 Harpo Foundation
- DC Commission on the Arts and Humanities
  - 2018 for $6,000
- 2015 The Native Arts and Cultures Foundation
- 2016 Halcyon Fellowship

== Publications ==
=== "Unsettled," 2015 ===
In her article, Tsouhlarakis discusses the exhibition, Athena LaTocha: Curated by Jaune Quick-to-See Smith at the CUE.
