= The Rancher =

2002 painting by Jaune Quick-to-See Smith

- Artist: Jaune Quick-to-See Smith
- Year: 2002
- Medium: Acrylic on canvas
- Dimensions: 183.5 cm × 122.2 cm (72.2 in × 48.1 in)
- Location: Hood Museum of Art; Hanover, New Hampshire

The Rancher is a 2002 painting by Jaune Quick-to-See Smith. It is in the collection of the Hood Museum of Art at Dartmouth College. The painting serves as Quick-to-See Smith's tribute to Montana, where she grew up.

== Description ==
The painting is a tribute to where Quick-to-See Smith grew up: Montana. The painting, which is acrylic paint on canvas, features Quick-to-See Smith's interpretation of George Catlin's painting, Ee-he-a-duck-chee-a (He Who Ties His Hair Before) in the middle of the painting, in black paint. Logos for Purina and Krispy Kreme are depicted, as is the painted words "french fries." Next to "french fries" are two hands painted saying "french fries" in American Sign Language. Half of a blue sign is on the right of the canvas, with "Hecho en USA" spilling off the canvas. "$19.99" is painted in the upper left corner.

The painting is signed and inscribed on the back, top edge of the painting, using black marker. It reads: [illeg.] Smith 2002 "THE RANCHER" ACl 72" x 48"

== Curatorial analysis ==
In this work, Quick-to-See Smith seeks to reject stereotypes about indigenous peoples of North America, by using Caitlin's work. The use of the brand logos is believed assert "that Native peoples can be simultaneously traditional and contemporary," according to curators at the Hood Museum of Art. "Hecho en USA" is meant to reflect "the intermingling of languages, cultures, and subcultures of America." Additionally, the word "french fries" and the sign language are meant to depict how Native peoples often must incorporate new ideas and words into their lexicon and lives as they seek to remain connected to modern life.

== History ==
The painting was purchased by the Hood Museum of Art, with monies from the William S. Rubin Fund, through the LewAllen Contemporary art gallery in Santa Fe, New Mexico. This painting has been shown in three exhibitions at the Hood Museum, "Native American Art at Dartmouth: Highlights from the Hood Museum of Art" (2011-12), Modern and Contemporary Art at Dartmouth: Highlights from the Hood Museum of Art" (2009-10), and "Picturing Change: The Impact of Ledger Drawing on Native American Art" (2004-05). It has also been exhibited at the Peabody Essex Museum, Colby College Museum of Art and the LewAllen Contemporary.
