= Demian Dinéyazhi' =

American artist and activist

Demian DinéYazhi'
- Born: 1983 (age 42–43); Gallup, New Mexico
- Education: Pacific Northwest College of Art
- Known for: Transdisciplinary works (photo, poetry, video, etc.)
- Notable work: Make Native America Great Again, A Nation is a Massacre, POZ Since 1492
- Website: https://burymyart.tumblr.com

Demian DinéYazhi' (born 1983) is a Native American artist and activist. Their work and advocacy focuses on indigenous and LGBTQ+ people and "consists of photography, sculpture, text, sound, video, land art performance, installation, street art and fabrics art."

They founded and directed the artist-activist organization called R.I.S.E.: Radical Indigenous Survivance & Empowerment, and are the co-director of the LGBTQ+ and Indigenous Two-Spirit zine titled Locusts: A Post-Queer Nation Zine. They have published poetry books promoting Indigenous and queer advocacy, including Ancestral Memory and An Infected Sunset.

In 2017, DinéYazhi' received the Brink Award from the Henry Art Gallery. They are currently based in Portland, Oregon. DinéYazhi' identifies as gender non-binary and uses gender neutral they/them pronouns.

== Early life and upbringing ==
DinéYazhi' was born in 1983 in Gallup, New Mexico into the Naasht'ézhí Tábąąhá (Zuni Clan Water's Edge) and Tódích'íí'nii (Bitter Water) clans of the Diné (Navajo). Growing up, they were exposed to the traditions of the Diné clans and the culture of Southwestern Native Americans. Their upbringing in traditional Native American culture brought them to understand "the sacredness of land" and "the importance of intergenerational knowledge", two ideas in which they have claimed as major influences for their advocacy and artwork.

Since a young age, DinéYazhi' was interested in literature and visual arts. Their interest in art and literature became the foundation for their career and artist-advocacy.

"I started off as a creative person mostly through writing. I've loved writing since I was in fourth grade, and once I got to middle school, high school, it started to have this more poetic tone to it... Poetry was my gateway to creating visual work: at some point what I wanted the work to convey grew outside of just text. I became more interested in photography and how there's this beautiful relationship between the body and the land." - Demian DinéYazhi in an interview with Anastasia Tuazon, a writer and arts organizer for Temporary Art Review

After moving to Portland, Oregon later in their life, they became familiar of the different gender systems that exist within their tribal community, and DinéYazhi' became more aware of and comfortable with their own non-binary gender identity.

== Advocacy ==
Growing up and being influenced by their culture, DinéYazhi' had difficulties with fitting in. They felt the pressure of needing to conform to Western societal ideals which they have termed as a form of "White Supremacist Capitalist Heteropatriarchial Colonization". Through their first-hand experiences and observations, they became educated about the histories of colonization and the conflicting relationships between the Native Americans and the American government. From these perspectives, DinéYazhi' began to explore the political ideologies and identities of 'Radical Indigenous Queer Feminism' that challenged the ideas of white supremacy and heteronormative patriarchy, especially in the field of contemporary art. This ideology inspired the radical direction they took in their political advocacy.

=== R.I.S.E.: Radical Indigenous Survivance & Empowerment ===
In 2010, branching off of their radical ideologies, DinéYazhi' founded R.I.S.E. (Radical Indigenous Survivance and Empowerment), an organization and initiative of Native American artist-activists. It was established in response to the growing awareness of the devastation among the Indigenous community caused the effects of white supremacy and colonization. The organization strives to promote the education, recognition, and appreciation of traditional Native North American art and culture. Ultimately, R.I.S.E. is intended to be used as the political platform for Indigenous artists and highlights the usages of multiple medias (including "photographs, paint, wheat paste, clay, bead-work, dancing, words, voices, sounds, and rituals") to promote Indigenous survivance and human rights. Through R.I.S.E., DinéYazhi' created numerous artworks that bluntly and directly criticize colonization and the American system. One of these artworks include A Nation is a Massacre that is displayed in Pioneer Works in Red Hook, New York.

On January 3, 2019, in coordination with the Recess Art Gallery and Studio in Brooklyn, New York, DinéYazhi' and R.I.S.E. opened an exhibition session entitled R.I.S.E.: COLLECTIVE FURY. It was organized by DinéYazhi' and the members of R.I.S.E. to symbolize how the frustration within the Indigenous and LGBTQ+ community could be mobilized and transformed into motivations for empowerment, unity, and resilience. The exhibition session consisted of a display of artworks, informational panel discussions, and interactive workshops that emphasized the narratives and histories of various Indigenous communities. Additionally, it also sought to put a focus on the themes of environment justice, feminism, decolonization, anti-fascism, and queer politics. R.I.S.E.: COLLECTIVE FURY closed on February 9, 2019, as it was a limited-time pop-up event at the Recess Art Gallery and Studio.

==== Locusts: A Post-Queer Nation Zine ====
Along with fellow queer Diné artist Kevin Holden, DinéYazhi' is a co-editor for Locusts: A Post-Queer Nation Zine. The zine was created to put attention upon the narratives of queer and trans people of color, as well as individuals of the Indigenous Two Spirit communities, through the medias of visual art, literature, personal essays, and interviews. Through the zine, both Holden and DinéYazhi' advocate for the visibility and awareness of people of color within the LGBTQ+ community by putting the attention on the issues they face, especially the issues of conforming to white Western societal ideals and standards.

The zine was rewarded with the Precipice Fund from the Portland Institute of Contemporary Art in 2017.

== Education ==
In 2014, DinéYazhi' earned their BFA in Intermedia Arts at the Pacific Northwest College of Arts.

== Artworks ==
=== Make Native America Great Again, 2016 ===
Created in collaboration with Cumbersome Multiples and artists John Henry and Tracy Shclapp, DinéYazhi' created their piece Make Native America Great Again in 2016. The piece consists of letterpress printing on top of a repurposed map of a Native American reservation as created by the American federal government.

Make Native America Great Again was created by DinéYazhi' in response to Donald Trump's presidential slogan: "Make America Great Again." DinéYazhi' intended the artwork to directly criticize conservative Americans and the patriotic perceptions of American history. The usage of the Native American reservation map was to represent and remind the audience of the colonial exploitation of Indigenous homelands inflicted by white settlers.

=== KA-HA-TENI KAY-YAH and KAY-YAH CAH-DA-KHI TA-GAID AH-CHANH, 2016 ===
Created in collaboration with photographer Kali Spitzer, DinéYazhi' created two works in 2016: KA-HA-TENI KAY-YAH, [Native (Native) Land (Land)] and KAY-YAH CAH-DA-KHI TA-GAID AH-CHANH and [Land (Land) Wound (Wound) Without (Without) Self Defense (Protect)]. The piece on the left side is entitled KA-HA-TENI KAY-YAH and consists of dirt that originates from Diné Bikéyah, the land in which DinéYazhi''s maternal grandparents are from. Additionally, the title was derived from the Navajo Code Talker Dictionary, an allusion to their maternal grandfather who served as a Navajo Code Talker in the U.S. Marine Corps. On the contrary, the piece of the right is entitled KAY-YAH CAH-DA-KHI TA-GAID AH-CHANH and consists of mined coal that also originates from Diné Bikéyah, the land of DinéYazhi''s ancestry. An estimated amount of 7.8 million tons of coal is extracted every year in the Diné land, and the coal mining has resulted in negative effects of the Indigenous community that impacted the health quality of the environment as well as the forced relocation of the Native people in the land.

These two works are DinéYazhi''s commentary on the strained relations of the state and the Indigenous people. They are advocating for environmental justice and Indigenous sovereignty through critiquing the deleterious effects of state interference with the land owned by the Native people.

=== POZ Since 1492, 2016 ===
Created in 2016, DinéYazhi' created POZ since 1492 (its alternate title being "The First Infection") using digital media. In this work, they manipulated a painting depicting the first Thanksgiving, distorting the image and inserting the text "POZ SINCE 1492".

DinéYazhi' created POZ since 1492 to promote the idea that the origins of HIV/AIDS in the North Americas are linked and associated with colonialism and the interference of white settlers. DinéYazhi' claims that the focus of HIV/AIDS should not be on impoverished and isolated Indigenous groups; rather, the emphasis should be on identifying white colonialism as the source and distributor of the disease internationally.

=== A Nation is a Massacre, 2019 ===
In 2019, DinéYazhi''s A Nation is a Massacre was first exhibited in on the third floor of the Pioneer Works gallery in Red Hook, New York. On the windows of the gallery, he inputted with all-capitalized, bold, red text: "A NATION IS A MASSACRE" and "THE DETAILS ARE GRUESOME & AMERICAN & AS PATRIOTIC AS GUN VIOLENCE & RAPE & MASS MURDER."

Commenting about the artwork, DinéYazhi' states:

"Death and grieving for Indigenous Peoples is like a war zone—a space unlike any other far removed from the 'stars and stripes.' We are expected to die without news headlines or revolution, and in this way we expect nothing; we accept death. It's a slow death, but with the same urgency as endangerment or extinction or invasion, or an asteroid the size of england or complete and inevitable economic collapse. Even in our survival and resilience, we come to the table ready to protect the most sacred of human rights." - Demian DinéYazhi'

DinéYazhi' created this piece to call out against the violence, hatred, and injustices put upon marginalized groups. According to David Everitt Howe, a curator at Pioneer Works, A Nation is a Massacre was intended to represent the centuries of violence and massacres against queer and Indigenous people that have occurred post-colonization.

=== my ancestors will not let me forget this, 2019 ===
In 2019, DinéYazhi' exhibited a sculpture at the Honolulu Biennial titled, my ancestors will not let me forget this. The sculpture is a neon sign depicting the phrase "EVERY/ AMERICAN FLAG/ IS A WARNING SIGN" which is a line from their poem, An Infected Sunset. A photo of the sculpture was featured as the cover art for Transgender Studies Quarterly (TSQ)'s first issue of 2024, which is themed "Everything Must Go: Abolition, Anti-Imperialism, and Anarchism."

=== We must stop imagining Apocalypse/Genocide + we must imagine liberation, 2024 ===
In 2024, DinéYazhi's “We must stop imagining Apocalypse/Genocide + we must imagine liberation”, was displayed at The Whitney Museum. It is a neon light structure on three separate metal stands. The first one spells out part of the title of the work, “We must stop imagining destruction + extraction deforestation + cages + torture + displacement + surveillance + genocide". The second one spells out “We must stop predicting apocalypses + fascist governments +capitalistic + hierarchy. For the last structure it spells out “We must pursue + predict + imagine routes toward liberation.” When this work is viewed from the outside of the building, the lights flicker and slowly spells out "Free Palestine". DinéYazhi' states that this work is to show the failure of settler colonialism, heteropatriarchy and capitalistic sabotage. Due to being affected by the pandemic and the recent genocide in Palestine, they believe that we as people are aware of how important it is to speak out about our lives.

== Selected exhibitions ==
=== Solo exhibitions ===
- (2018) A Nation is a Massacre, Pioneer Works, Red Hook, New York, USA
- (2018) Demian DinéYazhi': The Brink, Henry Art Gallery, Seattle, Washington, USA
- (2019) R.I.S.E.: COLLECTIVE FURY, Recess, Brooklyn, New York, USA

=== Group exhibitions ===
- (2016) Center for Contemporary Native Art, Portland Art Museum, Portland, Oregon, USA
- (2016) Frontier Imaginaries, Institute of Modern Art (IMA), Brisbane, Australia
- (2017) ICONOCLASTIC, Douglas F. Cooley Memorial Art Gallery, Portland, Maine, USA
- (2017) Tomorrow Tomorrow, Canada, Lower Manhattan, New York, USA
- (2017) Unholding, Artists Space, Lower Manhattan, New York, USA
- (2018) Between the Waters, Whitney Museum of American Art, Greenwich Village, New York, USA
- (2019) Unraveling Collective Forms, Los Angeles Contemporary Exhibitions (LACE), Hollywood, California, USA
- (2019) Hedonist Buddhist, Washington Project of the Arts, Washington D.C., USA
- (2019) System Failure, Minnesota Street Project, San Francisco, California, USA
- (2019) I Come To This Place, Smack Mellon, Brooklyn, New York, USA
- (2019) To Make Wrong/ Right/ Now, Hawaii Contemporary, Honolulu, Hawaii, USA
- (2019) Solidarity Struggle Victory, Southern Exposure, San Francisco, California, USA
- (2020) Nirin: 22nd Biennale of Sydney, Campbelltown Arts Centre, Campbelltown, Australia

== Collections ==
- Henry Art Gallery (Seattle, Washington)
- Pioneer Works (Brooklyn, New York)
- Whitney Museum of Art (Greenwich Village, New York)
- Portland Art Museum (Portland, Oregon)

== Honors and awards ==
- Crow's Shadow 2017 Golden Spot Residency (2017)
- The Henry Art Gallery's Brink Award (2017)
- The Hallie Ford Fellow in the Visual Arts (2018)
- The Eiteljorg Contemporary Art Fellow (2019)

=== Henry Art Gallery's Brink Award ===
One of the awards given to DinéYazhi' in their art career is the 2017 Brink Award from the Henry Art Gallery in Seattle, Washington. The award is given to upcoming artists of the ages 35 and under who work in the Cascadia region (areas of Oregon, Washington, and British Columbia). Upon receiving the award, DinéYazhi' was awarded with a grant of $12,500, a solo exhibition, and a work of art that would be permanently kept in the museum's collection. Regarding the award, the jury gives a commentary on their decision and analysis of DinéYazhi''s work:

"We are compelled by the way Demian complicates dominant queer narratives and understandings of indigeneity. Through a multi-modal practice, he enacts an ethics of mutuality and reciprocity, and pursues the decolonization of body and land. In the studio and in conversation with Demian, we observed that these ideas are moving in promising new directions."

In coalition with the award, DinéYazhi' opened their exhibition entitled "The Brink" at the Henry Art Gallery from April 14, 2018, to September 9, 2018.

== Publications ==
Along with their art career, DinéYazhi' has created poetry and creative literature. They published and partook in writing a couple of books sporadically throughout their career thus far.

=== Ancestral Memory ===
Self-published in 2016, Ancestral Memory is DinéYazhi''s poetry debut. It is a collection of their poems from the years ranging from 2009 to 2016, and it addresses the issues and complications that marginalized Indigenous and queer communities face in a modern, post-colonial society. It was written to enlighten the Indigenous and queer communities by celebrating their culture and tradition while critiquing the violence and oppression they face in a post-colonial society.

=== An Infected Sunset ===
Though the book was published in 2018, DinéYazhi' first began to write An Infected Sunset in 2016 in response to the Pulse Nightclub shooting, police brutality against black men, the Standing Rock and Dakota Pipeline protests, the inauguration of President Donald Trump, and the abrupt resurgence of white supremacy. Essentially, An Infected Sunset was written to serve as a motivational call to the Indigenous communities that strive for survivance and unity in the midst of the heightened corruption in the United States. According to DinéYazhi', it "is a reflection on queer sex, survival/death politics, indigenous identity, settler and heteronormative romanticism, environmental injustice, and the importance of honoring community."
