= Corwin Clairmont =

Salish-Kootenai artist and printmaker

Corky Clairmont
- Born: Corwin Clairmont; 1946 (age 79–80); St. Ignatius, Montana
- Citizenship: Confederated Salish and Kootenai Tribes of the Flathead Nation and American
- Education: BA from Montana State University, MFA from California State University
- Known for: Printmaker, Installation, Conceptual

Corwin "Corky" Clairmont is a printmaker and conceptual and installation artist from the Confederated Salish and Kootenai Tribes of the Flathead Nation. Known for his high concept and politically charged works, Clairmont seeks to explore situations that affect Indian Country historically and in contemporary times.

I don't put work out that gives solutions but provokes questions. - Corky Clairmont

== Background ==
=== Early life ===
Corky Clairmont was born in 1946 at the St. Ignatius Mission on the Salish Kootenai reservation. Creative at a young age, Clairmont was encouraged by his parents to be creative. During the holidays family members gave him paint by number kits, which he disliked, never completing them. At age 15 he submitted a design for the communities' tribal seal; it was chosen, and is still used to this day.

Attending high school in Polson he learned about the different elements of fine art, and during his sophomore year he was introduced to using a palette knife to paint with acrylics. This was his first experience in fine art painting, paving the path for a future as a professional artist.

=== Higher education ===
Obtaining a Bachelor of Arts at Montana State University, Clairmont went on to complete a graduate fellowship at San Fernando State University. He finalized his formal education in 1971 at California State University, Los Angeles, receiving a Master of Fine Arts. His higher educational experiences provided him awareness about the movements of the 20th century international art world. Clairmont was drawn to the work of Joseph Beuys and John Baldessari, primarily due to the environmental and nature based influence in their works. After graduation he remained in Los Angeles teaching fine arts and handling programming at Otis Art Institute.

=== Current activities ===
In 1984 Clairmont became an administrator at Salish Kootenai College, which at the time, did not have an arts program. He took the lead in creating an arts department. In 1989, he was named Director of Art Programming and Assistant Vice President, positions he still holds today. He designed the college's arts building, "Three Woodcocks", basing the design on a traditional Salish longhouse. He lives in Ronan, Montana and has served on the Montana Arts Council Board since 2008 and the Ronan Consumer Advisory Committee.

== Fine art career ==
Gail Tremblay on Clairmont's work:

His work offers a door to revelation and gives indigenous and non-Indian people alike a space to reflect on the dynamics of culture in their lives.

=== Early work ===
Clairmont started creating conceptual artworks inspired by the likes of Beuys and Baldessari, often working as an individual or collaborating with other artists, showing primarily in Los Angeles.

In 1979 he was awarded a National Endowment for the Arts Visual Arts Grant which supported him to travel to seven American cities and publish fragments of the statement "Support Subversive Art in Your Community" in major newspapers. Documenting his conceptual project, Clairmont gathered postcards and photographs from the seven cities, sending copies of these materials, and the newspapers, to the Whitney Museum of American Art and the Los Angeles County Museum of Art for display. Completed assemblages would allow viewers to see the statement in its entirety.

With Los Angeles Sidewalk/Survival (1981) Clairmont photographed 12-inch squares of Los Angeles sidewalks. The images depicted the many faces of concrete in the city: grass growing through cracks, pitted concrete, graffiti, contractor stamps. Each photograph had instructions on the back with instructions on how to survive broken bones, choking, nuclear fallout and other extreme situations. Through this series Clairmont sought to explore "the way differences in how occupants of rural and urban areas interact can create surreal dislocations of imagery and idea."

Clairmont's early pieces reflected many other conceptual works by other artists of the late 1970s and early 1980s, focusing on concerns about nature and the purpose of art. Suffering from feelings of dislocation after leaving the reservation, these works allowed Clairmont to convey the emotional impacts of moving from the Big Sky Country to a large metropolis like Los Angeles.

=== Return to Montana ===
In 1984 Clairmont returned to the reservation, where he became active in community life. He served on tribal committees, worked on the Flathead Resources Organization, attended sweat lodge, and became a teacher and administrator at Salish Kootenai College. He delved into historical studies of indigenous peoples and their relationships with early settlers, specifically the Flathead Indian Reservation and those of his friends off the reservation.

It's work that I feel is educational and is not just for the native community, but is for everyone that might want to get a better understanding of our Indian people. - Corky Clairmont

Influenced by his research he created two major works of his career about the Treaty of Hellgate. The first work is a reprint of the entire treaty printed in small type on a threefold wallet-sized card, which he distributed and displayed. The second work, Skunk Prairie Hellgate Treaty Rocks, featured the treaty text written in a spiral shape. Recreating the text of the twelve treaty articles in his own intricate handwriting gave Clairmont an even greater sense of connection to the experience of his community.

After completing the handwritten portion of the work, Clairmont cut his copy into 50 5x7 inch mats, with rectangular cutouts in the center of each mat. These cutouts were taken to Skunk Prairie, a traditional hunting and gathering area of the Salish Kootenai people. He distributed the cutouts under rocks, representing the ongoing relationship of humans and the earth, covered in lichen, photographing them and leaving them as an offering. The photographs were placed in the rectangular cutouts of the mats, then the mats were placed in clear plastic envelopes and displayed in the form of an "X" the wall, representing the signatures of those who signed the treaty.

=== 1990s ===
The 1990s saw the Quincentennial celebration of the arrival of Christopher Columbus in 1492, which led to a series of commentary artworks titled the Submuloc Warrior (Submuloc is Columbus spelled backwards). In this heavily charged series, Clairmont uses irony to confront the cities which have been named as a tribute to the explorer and the celebration of the anniversary of North American European colonization and genocide.

The Grandfather Rocks series comprised two artworks, one about the murder of Piegan Blackfeet man by the Lewis and Clark Expedition, and another about the defeat of Chief Joseph. A series of photographs and text, Clairmont combines the two encouraging viewers to question the historiography of the topics presented in the works.

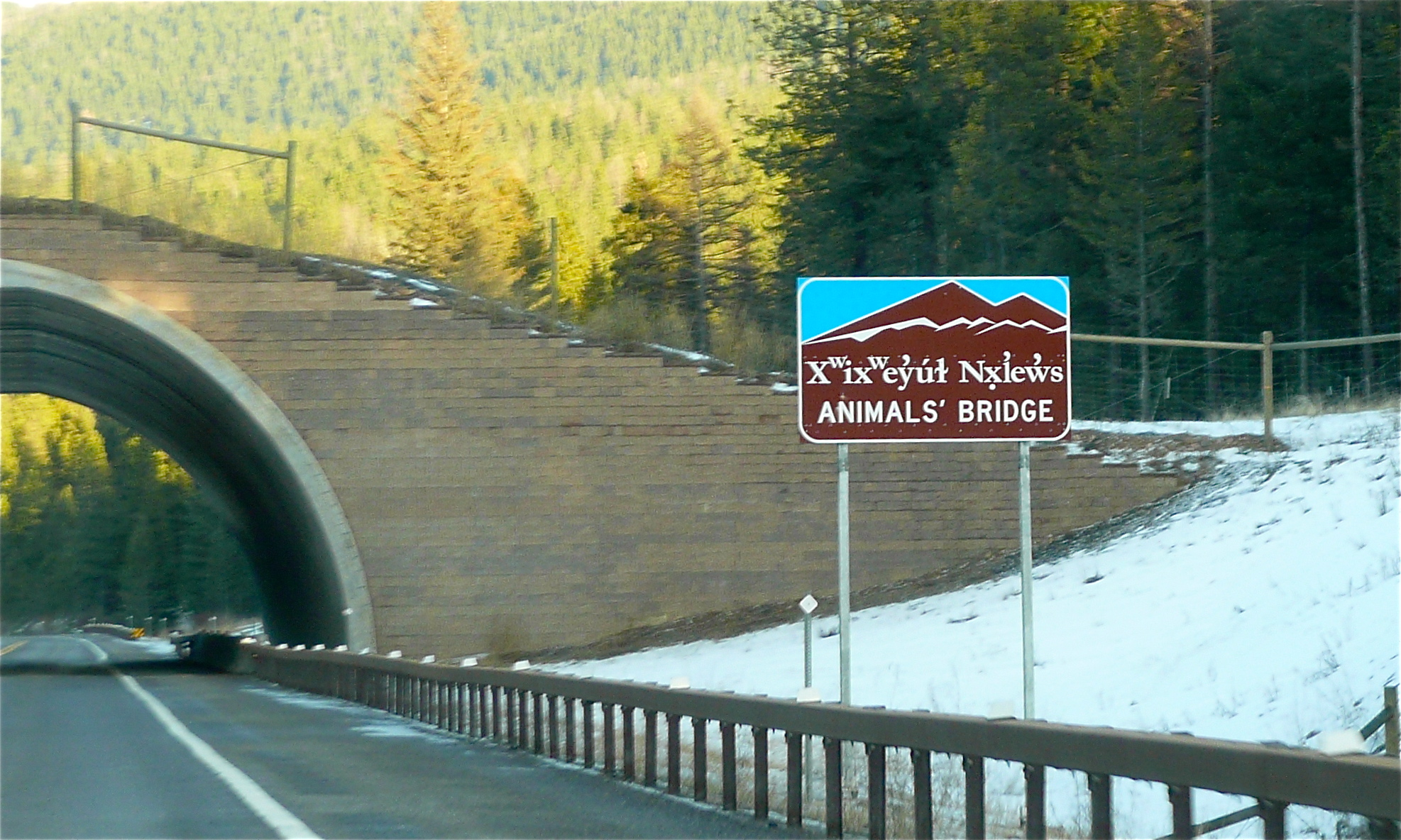
"Animals' Bridge," on the Flathead Indian Reservation in Montana, used by grizzly and black bears, deer, elk, mountain lions, and others

This decade also brought the prominence of printmaking into Clairmont's catalog. Heavily layered, his monoprints and prints entail multiple meanings and images, encouraging exploration by the viewer to question the meaning and symbolism within his works. Turtle X's 93 utilized images of turtles, bears, birds, buffalo, trucks, car, bulldozers, chevrons and photographs of Montana landscape and highways. Combined with bold colors and grayscale, he explored trade, transportation, and the dangerous effects that U.S. Route 93 has had on the reservation and its wildlife. Each image, in the series of 10 prints, proceeds to show the onslaught of traffic into the area, until the vehicles outnumber the animals. In response, Clairmont worked with community members and highway officials to secure overpasses over waterways and pond areas, allowing for safe passage of affected animals.

Video clips of bears, mountain lions, deer, and other animals using the Rt. 93 wildlife crossings are available. As of Feb. 28, 2011, the Montana Department of Transportation reports that "With the majority of the US 93 Evaro-Polson (The Peoples Way) reconstruction work on the Flathead Indian Reservation nearly complete, wildlife, and natural resource managers on the project are now moving into the next phase of assuring the highway is fitting into the landscape and Spirit of Place. The Peoples Way Project set a new standard for mitigating the impacts of roads and traffic on wildlife with wildlife fencing combined with dozens of wildlife underpasses and one wildlife overpass."

==== Paha Sapa controversy ====
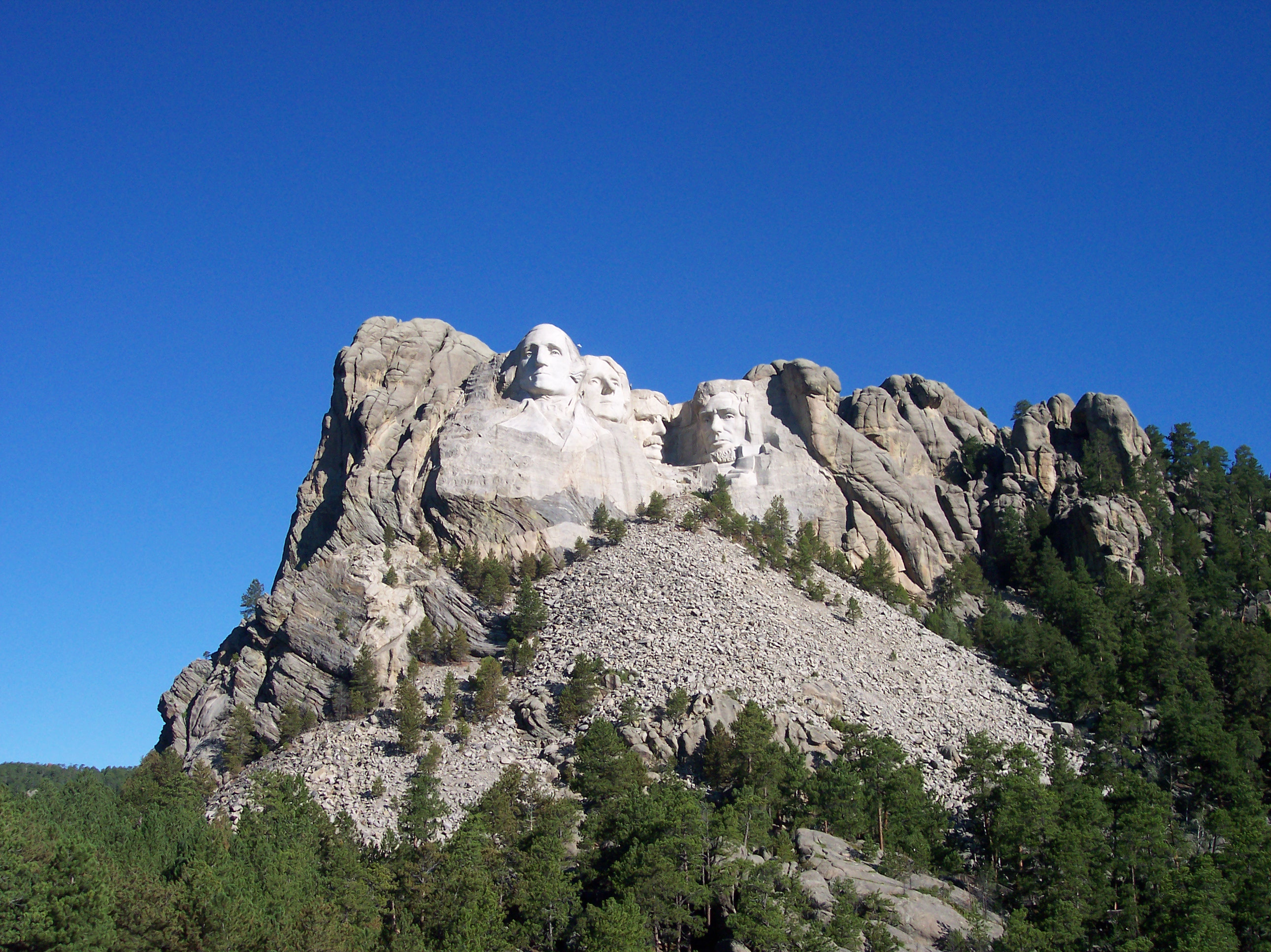
Mount Rushmore

In 1993 Clairmont created Paha Sapa, the Lakota word for the Black Hills, and the location of Mount Rushmore. In Paha Sapa Clairmont created life-sized silhouettes of two families, one Indian and one Euroamerican. Both the silhouetted family members and Euroamerican wear reflective sunglasses. The Euroamerican sunglasses reflect the presidential images on Mount Rushmore while, the Indian family sunglasses show four skulls, that make a statement about the history of genocide towards indigenous peoples, and raising the question about what the largest of all Presidential memorials is actually showing us—do we see the gigantic faces of greatness, or the immensity of death?

Displayed in a group show at the Paris Gibson Square Museum of Art, Paha Sapa was viewed by the superintendent of Great Falls schools, who proceeded to cancel all scheduled field trips to the exhibition which celebrated American Indian artists from Montana. The press got wind of the controversy, in which the superintendent defended the decision on grounds of not wanting to expose students to artwork that criticized the government's actions towards Indians. This led to major conversations and dialogue by local and regional residents, who questioned the politically charged artwork and the censorship that took place.

=== 2000s ===
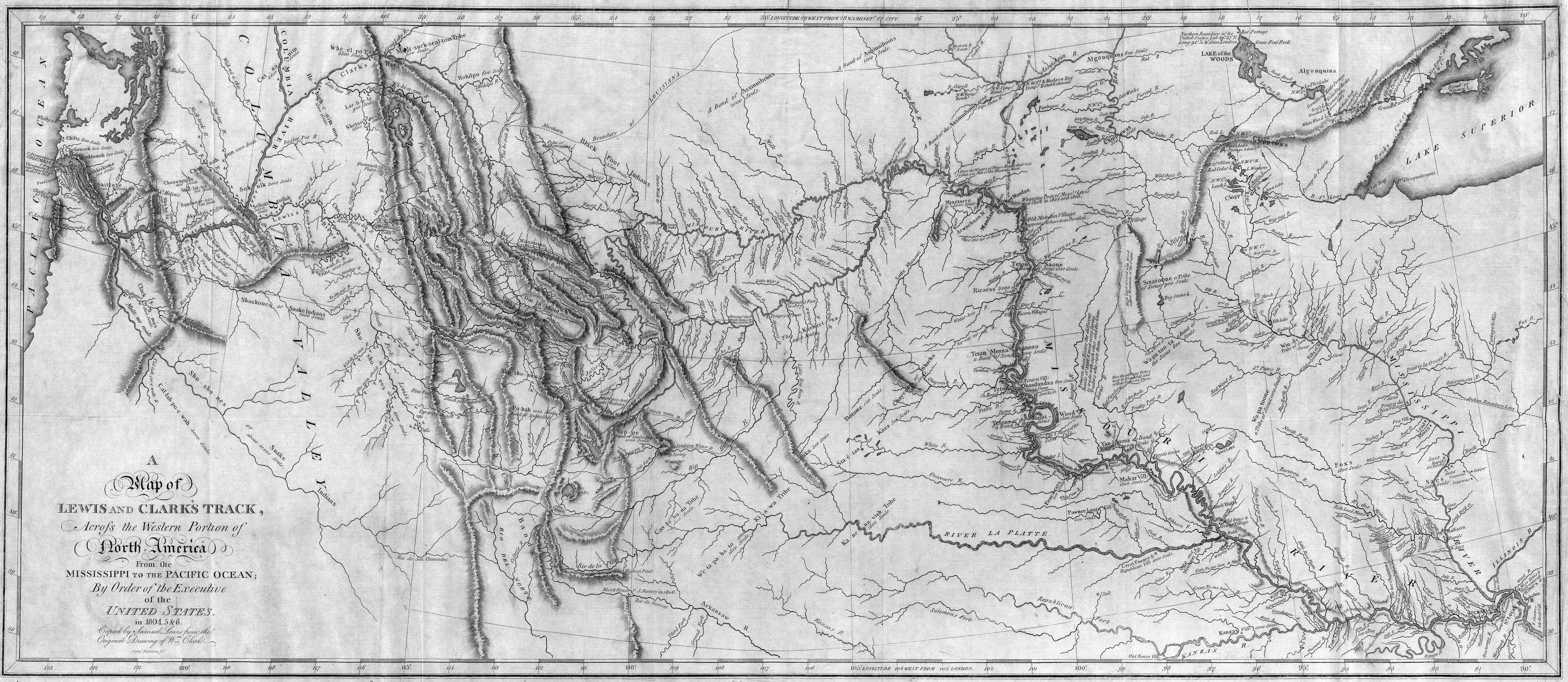
The western trail of Lewis and Clark's exploration which served as an influence for the 10,000 series.

In the early 2000s he decided to revisit Lewis and Clark in the series 10,000 Years Indigenous Indian People, 200 Years Lewis and Clark. Monoprints, the series continues his use of animal imagery such as lizards, turtles, fish, eagles, hawks, bear and horses. Moving through the prints, the animals disappear and reappear, representing the trail taken by Lewis and Clark from Bismarck, North Dakota to the Pacific Coast. Retracing the trail, Clairmont shows photographs and segments of a map depicting the journey. Moccasin prints travel through the works, representing the hard-soled shoes that changed the way of life for Native peoples in the areas explored, shoes that don't feel the ground beneath them, unlike the soft-soled natural moccasins. A serious look at the value of resources, the affected cultures of journey, and the land that was disturbed, Clairmont continued to reflect on the effects of Anglo settling in Indian Country, not just his own community.

New installation work began to form during this decade as well, including TIME X, using gift shop "artifacts" - trinkets collected from his travels representing "Indians" - in an altar like presentation. Clairmont questions stereotypes, kitsch, and the way that Lewis and Clark's exploration is represented in gift shops and culture in contemporary times.

In 2003 he was rewarded with an Eiteljorg Fellowship for Native American Fine Art. TIME X, 10,000 Years Indigenous Indian People, 200 Years Lewis and Clark, Turtle X's 93 and Split Shield were exhibited in a group show at the Eiteljorg Museum of American Indians and Western Art.

=== 2010s ===
In June 2010 Clairmont co-designed the Confederated Salish and Kootenai Tribes veteran memorial with architect Paul Bishop. The memorial, made of granite, forms a large eagle. Each side of the center panel features images of a mounted warrior, one male and one female, on each side, along with buffalos. Images of Salish and Kootenai camps are also depicted, on the wings of the eagle. The panels feature the names of Salish, Pend d'Oreille and Kootenai tribal members who have served throughout the United States military, with room for upwards of 2,600 names, as well as an area for unknown warriors. Seeking inspiration, Clairmont visited with tribal elder veterans for ideas on what the memorial should look like. Upon completing the design, he presented it to community members of various groups for approval. Clairmont on creating the memorial:

I felt that the Creator and those we are honoring got to me somehow and influenced the concept I came up with. In reality my inspiration came from many forces. I just put what I see together. Even though this memorial is specific to our tribal veterans I can't help but believe that it honors all Indian veterans.

=== Notable works ===
- Emblem of the American Indian Library Association
- Tribal seal of the Salish-Kootenai
- Confederated Salish and Kootenai Tribes Veterans Memorial, 2010

=== Exhibitions ===
- Corwin Clairmont: Two-Headed Arrow/The Tar Sands Project
- Corwin Clairmont: Welcome to the Rez, 2009, Holter Museum of Art, Helena, MT
- Native Perspectives on the Trail, 2005, Missoula Art Museum, Missoula, MT
- Reflections After Lewis and Clark–Contemporary Native American Art, Montana Museum of Art & Culture, Missoula, MT
- Corwin Clairmont: Halfway Between Here & There, 2001, Missoula Art Museum, Missoula, MT
- Indian Reality Today, 1999, Westfälisches Museum für Naturkunde, Muenster, West Germany
- New Art of the West 5, 1996, Eiteljorg Museum, Indianapolis, IN
- Contemporary Indian Art, 1995, Denver Art Museum, Denver, CO
- Treaty Times: Past, Present and Future, Missoula Art Museum, Missoula, MT

=== Notable collections ===
- Missoula Art Museum, Missoula, MT
- Montana Museum of Art & Culture, Missoula, MT
- National Museum of the American Indian, Washington, D.C.
- Spencer Museum of Art, Lawrence, KS

=== Awards ===
- Montana Governor's Arts Award for Visual Arts, 2008, State of Montana
- Eiteljorg Fellowship, 2003, Eiteljorg Museum of American Indians and Western Art
- National Endowment for the Arts Visual Arts Grant, 1979, National Endowment for the Arts
- Ford Foundation Grant for the Arts, 1971, Ford Foundation
- Artist-in-Residence, Rutgers University

== See also ==
- List of Native American artists
- Visual arts by indigenous peoples of the Americas
