= Brenda Mallory =

Brenda Mallory may refer to:

- Brenda Mallory (artist) (born 1955), Native American artist and a member of the Cherokee Nation
- Brenda Mallory (public official) (born 1957), American lawyer and government official
