= St. Ignatius, Montana =

- Town
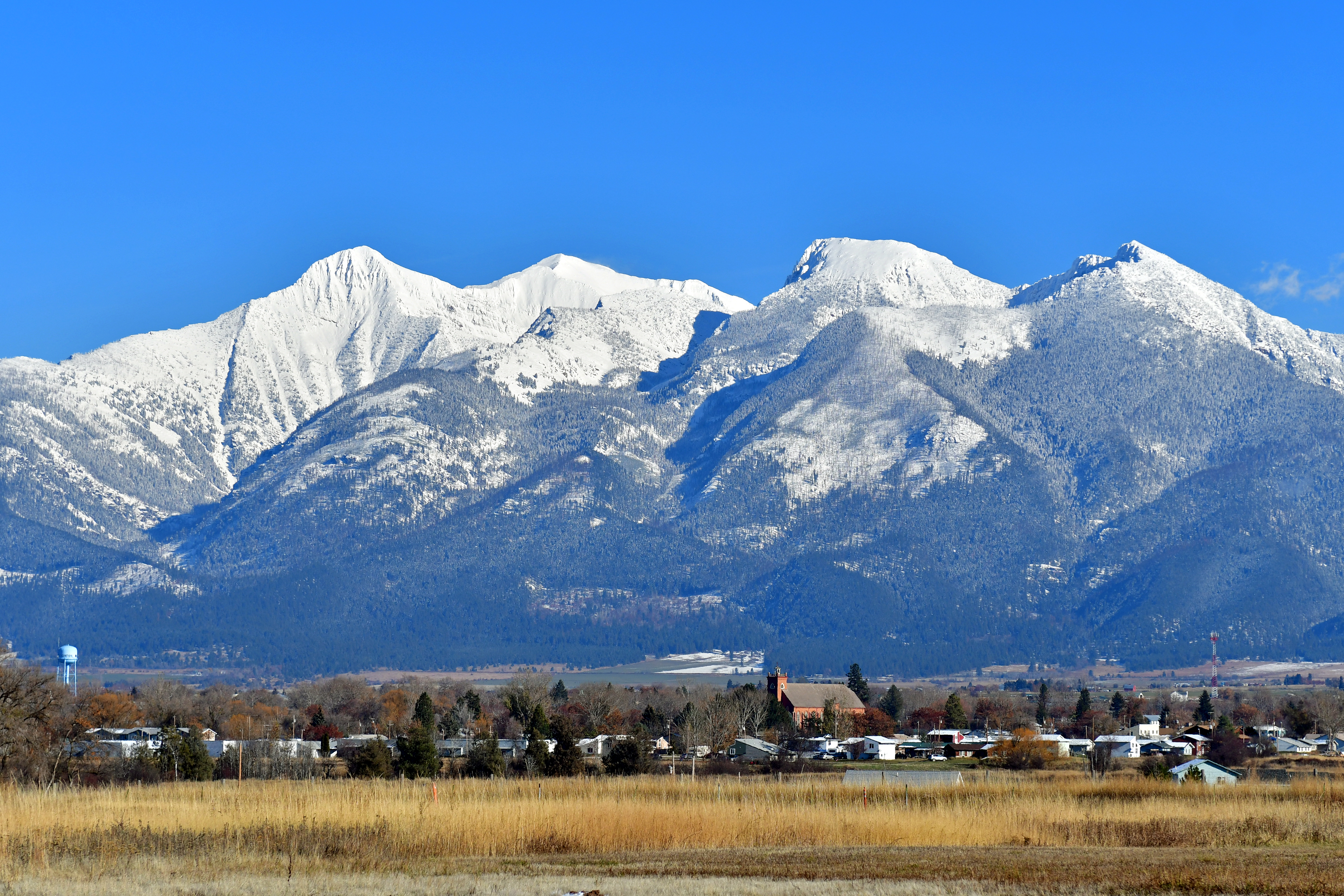
- St. Ignatius, Montana. The brick St. Ignatius Mission is visible against the Mission Mountains
- Nickname: Mission
- Location of St. Ignatius, Montana

- Location within Montana Location within the United States
- Coordinates: 47°19′07″N 114°05′44″W
- Country: United States
- State: Montana
- County: Lake

Area
  - Total: 0.53 sq mi (1.38 km^{2})
  - Land: 0.53 sq mi (1.38 km^{2})
  - Water: 0 sq mi (0.00 km^{2})
- Elevation: 2,940 ft (900 m)

Population (2020)
  - Total: 768
  - Density: 1,440.9/sq mi (556.33/km^{2})
- Time zone: UTC-7 (Mountain (MST))
  - Summer (DST): UTC-6 (MDT)
- ZIP code: 59865
- Area code: 406
- FIPS code: 30-65275
- GNIS feature ID: 2412594
- Website: townofstignatius.com

St. Ignatius (Salish: snyél̓mn, Ktunaxa: ʔa·kikqǂaǂaǂuk̓pǂiʔit) or Saint Ignatius is a town in Lake County, Montana, United States. The population was 768 at the 2020 census. The town is located on the Flathead Indian Reservation.

== History ==
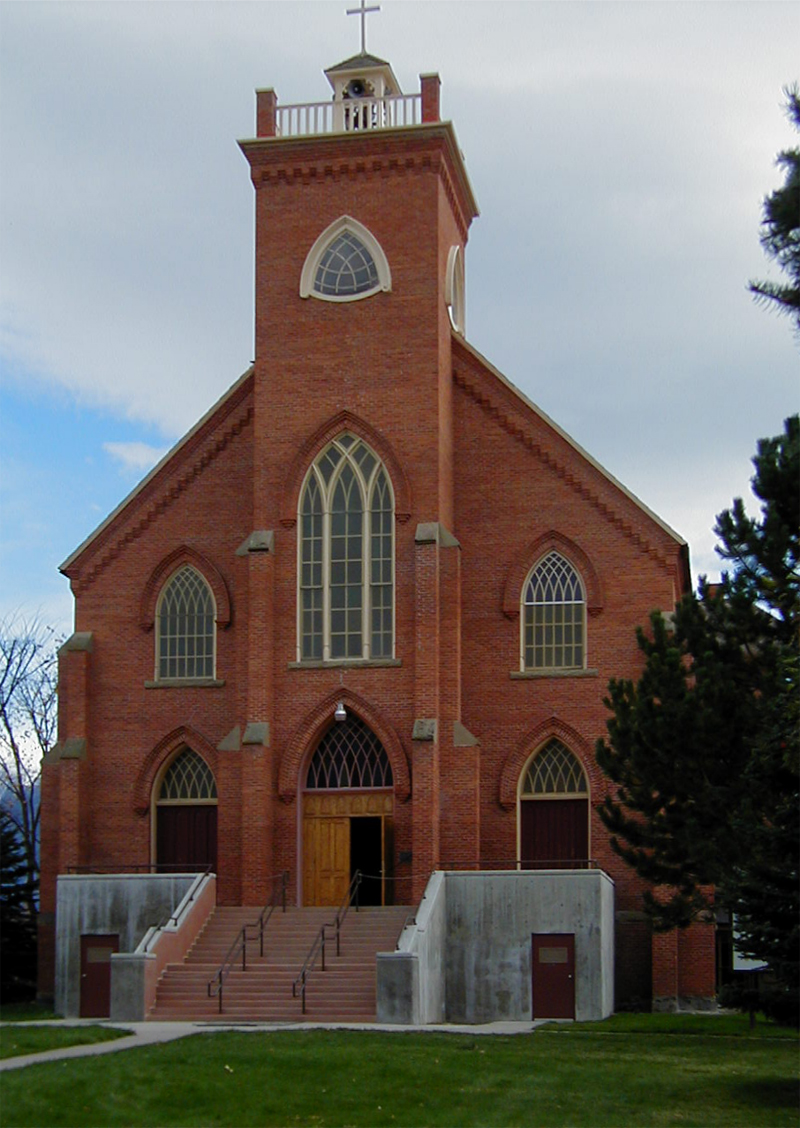
St. Ignatius Mission

It was named for and is the site of the St. Ignatius Mission, established by Fr. Pierre-Jean De Smet, a Belgian Jesuit Catholic missionary who worked for his entire career in the American Midwest and West. The mission is listed on the National Register of Historic Places. In July 1919 the town was all but wiped out by raging forest fire. Only a bank, one store and a hotel, remained standing.

== Geography ==
U.S. Route 93 passes through town.

According to the United States Census Bureau, the town has a total area of 0.56 square miles (1.45 km^{2}), all land.

=== Climate ===
This climatic region is typified by large seasonal temperature differences, with warm to hot (and often humid) summers and cold (sometimes severely cold) winters. According to the Köppen Climate Classification system, St. Ignatius has a humid continental climate, abbreviated "Dfb" on climate maps.

== Demographics ==
Historical population
Census	Pop.	Note	%±
1940	768		—
1950	781		1.7%
1960	940		20.4%
1970	925		−1.6%
1980	877		−5.2%
1990	778		−11.3%
2000	788		1.3%
2010	842		6.9%
2020	768		−8.8%
U.S. Decennial Census

=== 2010 census ===
As of the census of 2010, there were 842 people, 333 households, and 210 families living in the town. The population density was 1,503.6 inhabitants per square mile (580.5/km^{2}). There were 369 housing units at an average density of 658.9 per square mile (254.4/km^{2}). The racial makeup of the town was 48.3% White, 0.2% African American, 42.4% Native American, 0.1% Pacific Islander, 0.2% from other races, and 8.7% from two or more races. Hispanic or Latino of any race were 4.2% of the population.

There were 333 households, of which 37.5% had children under the age of 18 living with them, 36.0% were married couples living together, 21.0% had a female householder with no husband present, 6.0% had a male householder with no wife present, and 36.9% were non-families. 31.5% of all households were made up of individuals, and 17.1% had someone living alone who was 65 years of age or older. The average household size was 2.53 and the average family size was 3.18.

The median age in the town was 35 years. 30.2% of residents were under the age of 18; 7.8% were between the ages of 18 and 24; 22.6% were from 25 to 44; 24.6% were from 45 to 64; and 14.8% were 65 years of age or older. The gender makeup of the town was 48.2% male and 51.8% female.

=== 2000 census ===
As of the census of 2000, there were 788 people, 307 households, and 194 families living in the town. The population density was 1,509.1 inhabitants per square mile (582.7/km^{2}). There were 328 housing units at an average density of 628.1 per square mile (242.5/km^{2}). The racial makeup of the town was 52.54% White, 44.67% Native American, 0.13% Asian, 0.13% Pacific Islander, 0.25% from other races, and 2.28% from two or more races. Hispanic or Latino of any race were 4.19% of the population.

There were 307 households, out of which 34.5% had children under the age of 18 living with them, 40.4% were married couples living together, 18.6% had a female householder with no husband present, and 36.8% were non-families. 31.9% of all households were made up of individuals, and 15.0% had someone living alone who was 65 years of age or older. The average household size was 2.56 and the average family size was 3.27.

In the town, the population was spread out, with 32.1% under the age of 18, 9.3% from 18 to 24, 24.6% from 25 to 44, 21.7% from 45 to 64, and 12.3% who were 65 years of age or older. The median age was 33 years. For every 100 females there were 84.5 males. For every 100 females age 18 and over, there were 74.8 males.

The median income for a household in the town was $25,682, and the median income for a family was $34,250. Males had a median income of $30,804 versus $24,844 for females. The per capita income for the town was $12,336. About 15.5% of families and 19.5% of the population were below the poverty line, including 20.2% of those under age 18 and 17.6% of those age 65 or over.

== Government ==
St. Ignatius has a mayor and four city councilors. The councilors are elected to four-year terms. In 2025, incumbent mayor Daren Incashola ran unopposed.

== Education ==
- St. Ignatius High School
- Glacier Lake School, a private alternative school
- Pinehaven Christian Children's Ranch

The St Ignatius School-Community Library is a public library which serves the area.

== Media ==
The Valley Journal provides local news to Arlee, Charlo, Pablo, Polson, Ronan, and St. Ignatius.

== Notable people ==
- Sam Burley, middle-distance track athlete; born in St. Ignatius
- Corwin Clairmont, artist and educator
- Tim Ryan, country singer
- Diane Sands, member of the Montana House of Representatives; born in St. Ignatius
- Stephanie Trudeau, 2007 Miss Montana USA; grew up in St. Ignatius
