= Athena LaTocha =

American artist

- Born: Anchorage, Alaska, U.S.
- Education: School of the Art Institute of Chicago; Stony Brook University; Art Students League of New
- Known for: Painting

Athena LaTocha is an American artist based in New York. Her work focuses on humans' relationships to natural and industrial landscapes. She is of Hunkpapa Lakota and Ojibwe descent.

Her work has been featured at the Fairfield University Museum of Art, IAIA Museum of Contemporary Native Arts, Crystal Bridges Museum of American Art, New York State Museum, Artists Space, South Dakota Art Museum, the CUE Art Foundation in New York, International Gallery of Contemporary Art in Anchorage, Alaska, and the Ice House gallery in New York. She was one of six artists selected for Wave Hill's winter workspace program in 2018.

== Early life ==
LaTocha was born in Anchorage, Alaska. Her father is Polish and Austrian descent, and her mother is Native American, from the Standing Rock Sioux Tribe in North and South Dakota and from the Keweenaw Bay Indian Community in Michigan.

== Education ==
She received her Bachelor of Fine Arts degree from the School of Art Institute of Chicago and earned her Master of Fine Arts (2007) from Stony Brook University in New York. While she was trained in oil painting, LaTocha apprenticed in bronze at the Beacon Fine Arts Foundry in Beacon, New York. She also took printmaking classes at the Art Students League of New York.

== Creative process ==
Her background in oil painting gave way into using other methods of her art. She has said that, "Over the years, I started removing my hand more and removing brushes and all of the proper tools we're trained with as painters. It's been years of finding other ways to look at the process, and other ways to look at and interact with materials." She is often using sumi ink (made from the soot of pine branches in Japan) mixed with earthy material and gathered objects such as bricks and tire shreds to paint. She'll use the tire shreds to pull the ink over the canvas, or move the canvas itself in "wavelike undulations" to guide the ink. In her time at Wave Hill, she also made use of a root ball, a mass of roots at the base of a plant that has soil surrounding it. She usually works with her canvases on the floor with her working over and on top of them. She has said that, "Working aerially with my images on the floor, I am interested in being inside the image rather than the outside as an easel painter."

== Message ==
LaTocha brings attention to the idea that landscapes are an active thing as opposed to objects. She embodies the belief that humans are part of the landscape rather than separate from it by literally standing within the scenes she paints. She has said that, "For a number of years now I've been working with land motifs, land imagery. All of my work is about being immersed in these spaces, these environments. Sometimes I'm reluctant to use the word 'landscape' because there's a certain kind of genre, a certain kind of concept or ideology when you think about the idea of landscape. It connotes a kind of reverence or allusion to something. It's usually something that you're looking at or looking upon. It's this view or window into another world, a natural world or an industrial one." While bringing attention to this she tries to have the observer and artist be a part of the piece itself as she herself has stated, "In the aboriginal sense one is actively moving through the landscape. Humans are part of the landscape, not separate from it."

== Selected exhibitions ==
LaTocha has been featured in solo and group exhibitions across the United States, including the Institute of Contemporary Art at Maine College of Art & Design, the Weatherspoon Art Museum, the Virginia Museum of Fine Arts, and National Gallery of Art. The CUE Art Foundation in New York presented a solo exhibition in 2015 curated by curator/artist/activist Jaune Quick-to-See Smith. Another solo exhibition, Forces of Nature (2017), at the Museum of Contemporary Native Arts in Santa Fe displayed La Bajada Red, an ink wash work that spanned the entire wall from floor to ceiling. In January 2021, the solo exhibition, Land Disturbed, opened at the Olin Fine Arts Center at the Washington & Jefferson College.

For Art for a New Understanding: Native Voices, 1950s to Now (2018-2019) at the Crystal Bridges Museum of American Art, the curators selected Ozark (Shelter in Place), a large wall piece in ink and earth on paper created from rock face impressions from a local national park and then molded lead sheets affixed on top.

In December 2020, she was one of the artists featured in the Urban Native Artists exhibition at the Revelation Gallery, New York, NY; fellow exhibitors included Vernon Bigman (Navajo Nation), Nadema Agard, and Mario Martinez (Pascua Yaqui).

== Selected grants and awards ==
- Anonymous Was a Woman Award, 2023
- Rockefeller Brothers Fund Pocantico Art Prize in Visual Arts, 2022
- Eiteljorg Museum of American Indians and Western Art Contemporary Art Fellowship, 2021
- NYSCA/NYFA Artist Fellowship in Painting, 2021
- Joan Mitchell Foundation grant, 2019 and 2016
- Robert Rauschenberg Foundation grant, 2013
