= Kali Spitzer =

Canadian indigenous photographer (born 1987)

Kali Spitzer (born 1987) is a Canadian indigenous photographer. She is Kaska Dena from the Yukon and then Daylu (Lower Post, British Columbia). Her father is Kaska Dena and her mother is Jewish from Transylvania, Romania.

== Education ==
Spitzer earned her certificate in professional photography from the Western Academy of Photography and has studied at the Institute of American Indian Arts in Santa Fe, New Mexico, under the mentorship of Will Wilson.

== Career ==
Spitzer has worked with film in 35mm, 120 and large format, as well as wet plate collodion process using an 8-by-10 camera. She works in portraiture, and photographs cultural practices and ceremonies in her community. At the age of 20, she returned to the Yukon, where she is originally from, and documented the cultural practices around hunting, fishing, trapping, tanning moose and caribou hides, and beading. She is also known to use tintype photography as a means to place her work "in dialogue with the problematic history of Native American imagery by white photographers".

Spitzer received a Reveal Indigenous Art Award in 2017 from the Hnatyshyn Foundation.

Spitzer's photograph Sister (2016) is the image used as the basis for the sculpture Every One, which is part of the social engagement work called the MMIWQT Bead Project by artist Cannupa Hanska Luger. The work was made up of over 4,000 clay beads made by people all over North America as to create portrait in a way to "rehumanize data" surrounding missing and murdered Indigenous women, girls, queer and trans people.

== Exhibitions ==
Spitzer's work was showcased at the 2018 Contemporary Native Art Biennial.

She has done exhibitions at the Sherbrooke Museum of Fine Arts, Sherbrooke, Quebec, the Portland Art Museum's Center for Contemporary Native Art, the Never Apart Centre in Montreal, Quebec, and the grunt gallery in Vancouver, British Columbia.
