= Luzene Hill =

Native American multimedia and installation artist

- Born: Caroline Luzene Hill; 1946 (age 79–80); Atlanta, Georgia, U.S.
- Citizenship: Eastern Band Cherokee, American
- Education: Western Carolina University (BFA, MFA)
- Occupation: Artist

Caroline Luzene Hill (born 1946) is a Native American multimedia artist and citizen of the Eastern Band of Cherokee Indians. She combines performance with installation to reflect on violence against women, using lyrical abstraction to approach difficult topics. She is best known for her 2011-2015 work Retracing the Trace, an installation reflecting on the prevalence and pain of sexual assault through the lens of Hill's own experience. Her works primarily explore themes of the trauma and shame produced by various types of violence enacted against women and indigenous cultures and the transformative healing powers of art. Beyond the United States, Hill's art has exhibited internationally in Canada, Russia, Japan, and the United Kingdom.

== Early life and education ==
Caroline Luzene Hill received the name "Luzene" through her paternal Cherokee grandmother. She grew up in Atlanta with her European mother and her family. Hill explained that because her father's parents were sent to Carlisle Indian Industrial School in Pennsylvania where they faced severe punishment for speaking their native language, her grandparents never spoke or taught Cherokee to their own children or grandchildren, despite teaching them to have pride in their heritage.

Hill began studying art in her early thirties, but did not pursue her art in earnest until her late forties, due to familial obligations. In 2006, she moved to Western North Carolina in order to focus on art, deepen her understanding of her Cherokee heritage, and learn more about the endangered Cherokee language.

Hill completed a Master of Fine Arts degree at Western Carolina University in 2012, and Retracing the Trace was part of her Master's project. In her thesis, Hill explained that each cord contained between one and 3,780 knots, representing the estimated numbers of rapes that go unreported in the United States every day. Elaborating on the use of these knotted and crimson-dyed cords, Hill stated that "They aren't being counted by our justice system, but I'm counting them. Each cord, like each woman, is unique." Likewise, her use of South American qhipu knotting tradition connected the silencing of sexual assault survivors to the silencing of indigenous cultures. In developing Retracing the Trace, Hill found inspiration in the work of a handful of other women artists who, similarly, explored themes of abuse and trauma, including Suzanne Lacy, Kara Walker, and Tracey Emin as well as the ideas of Jacques Lacan.

== Artistic works ==
Hill's work explores trauma, violence against women, and the healing power of art. Her first exhibit, In de Soto's Path, happened in 1997 at the Santa Fe Indian Market. Some of Hill's earlier works also drew on Cherokee creation myths to explore linkages between sexuality, fulfillment, pain, and birth, presenting indigenous American art as connected to contemporary and universal, rather than strictly historical, themes.

Her most famous work, Retracing the Trace, reflected her own experience as a rape survivor. The installation featured Hill laying in the middle of thousands of red cords tied into quipu knots. After Hill rose from the pile of strewn knots, her silhouette remained on the floor, the outline mirroring the imprint her own body left in the mud and leaves after her own rape. Over the course of ten days, Hill returned to the gallery, rearranging and affixing each knotted cord to a new position on the gallery walls until a new trace, this one of her own creation, encircled the space.

Hill uses carmine to dye her works the signature crimson red that features so prominently in many of her works. In addition to being reminiscent of blood, the production of this particular dye by female cochineal insects to deter predators, also resonates with the major themes of Hill's work. Indigenous South American cultures used this dye during pre-colonial times in protection ceremonies and in creating protective objects.

Artist and art scholar Tania Abramson saw Hill's art part of a tradition of "female artists who were victims of sexual violence as mediums of enduring transformation, agents of shifting kaleidoscopes that dance between shame and resurrection, humiliation and insight, rage and imagination."

After receiving a Eiteljorg Museum Contemporary Art Fellowship and First Peoples Fund Fellowship in 2015, Hill collaborated with Frank Brannon of Speakeasy Press to produce a fine art book, called Spearfinger, printed solely in Cherokee syllabary. Hill discovered the story of Spearfinger, a frightening character from Cherokee myth who eats the livers of children, in James Mooney's History, Myths and Sacred Formulas of the Cherokee.

Hill met Cherokee Nation artist Brenda Mallory in 2015 and, two years later, they co-exhibited Connecting Lines at the Portland Art Museum's Center for Contemporary Native Art.

In 2019, Hill received the Ucross Fellowship for Native American Visual Artists.

== Personal life ==
In 1994, Hill experienced a brutal rape, involving being strangled by her jacket's cord, while jogging in an Atlanta park. The details of this event later informed Hill's art and particularly her most notable work, Retracing the Trace.

Hill is an enrolled member of the Eastern Band of Cherokee Indians. She lives in Atlanta, Georgia.
