= Tanis S'eiltin =

Tlingit installation artist, painter, printmaker, and sculptor

Tanis Maria S'eiltin (born 1951) is a Tlingit installation artist, painter, printmaker, and sculptor.

== Early life and career ==
S'eiltin was born into a family of artists. She learned from her mother, who weaved Chilkat robes and sewed skins into garments. As a child, she often visited Tlingit relatives in Haines, Alaska.

She earned a Bachelor of Fine Arts from the University of Alaska Fairbanks in 1986. She then earned her Masters of Fine Arts in mixed media from the University of Arizona, where she explored her unique aesthetic.

S'eiltin is an associate professor and researcher of art and humanities at Fairhaven College.

== Works ==
S'eiltin uses classically indigenous materials in her art, including animal pelts and bones. Themes in S'eiltin's works include the impact of Western colonization, postmodernism, and statements of resistance and hope.

One of S'eiltin's works, Hit (House in Tlingit Language), is a 2007 mixed-media installation, including video components, that includes a replica M16 rifle suspended in a 55-gallon glass tank of oil and water. The work demonstrates themes of colonialism and toxic masculinity. The work demonstrates parallels between the Angoon bombardment and the First Gulf War, while also bringing attention to stereotypes and of Indigenous and Muslim women.

On her art, S'eiltin says "I strive to create art that is aesthetically beautiful and informative, the goal is to encourage dialogue and raise awareness."

== Awards and recognition ==
S'eiltin was a 2005 recipient of the Eiteljorg Fellowship.

== Collections and exhibitions ==
S'eiltin's works are available in the following collections:

- Anchorage Museum
- Eiteljorg Museum of American Indians and Western Art
- University of Alaska Museum of the North
- Washington State Arts Commission

Her work has been exhibited in the following group shows and exhibitions:

- Territorial Trappings (M. Rosetta Hunter Art Gallery at Seattle Central College, 2012)
- Making Sense of Things (Gorman Museum at the University of California, Davis in collaboration with the McMaster Museum of Art, 2006)
- Changing Hands: Art Without Reservation (Museum of Arts and Design, 2005)
- Eewdoowata'w ag'e: Did They Rob You? (Institute of American Indian Arts Museum, 1999)
- Watchful Eyes, Native American Women Artists (Heard Museum, 1994)
