= Susie Silook =

American sculptor

Susie Paallengetaq Silook (born 1960) is a carver, sculptor, writer and actress, of Siberian Yupik, Inupiaq and Irish descent. She was born in Gambell, Alaska.

== Life and career ==
Silook works primarily with walrus tusk ivory and whalebone, and selects for her subject matter images of women, including violence against Native women, rather than the more common depictions of animal motifs. She explores the realm of the fantastic in Yupik culture, working with ancestral ivory doll forms from her tribe on St. Lawrence Island.

She is an activist for Indigenous women and artists, building awareness around the cultural, legal use of walrus ivory and other media from the food sources of her people, which are slowly being banned in the United States due to President Obama's order banning elephant ivory in America. Highlighting the overreach of colonialist conservation in this disenfranchisement of the one of few resources available to communities still living harmoniously with their natural environment, she advocates for the rights of Indigenous People in conservation movements.

Silook's sculptures are in the Anchorage Museum, the Alaska Native Heritage Center, de Young Museum, and the Eiteljorg Museum of American Indians and Western Art.

== Awards and recognition ==
- Governor's Award for an Individual Artist (2000)
- Eiteljorg Fellowship (2001)
- United States Artists Rasmuson Fellow (2007)

== Bibliography ==
- Silook, Susie (2001). "Two Against the Arctic: My Summer as a 'Movie Star'". Alaska Geographic 28 (3): 62–65. Silook describes her experiences appearing in Two Against the Arctic while an elementary school student in Nome. The film, produced by James Algar and directed by Robert Clouse, was based on Sally Carrighar's Icebound Summer and aired on The Wonderful World of Disney in October 1974.
- Silook, Susie (2003). "The Artist Napaaq: 1906-1971". In Suzi Jones, Eskimo Drawings. Chicago, IL: University of Chicago Press. ISBN 978-1885267054.
- Silook, Susie (2007) "Graveyard and Bubbles." The Alaska Quarterly Review 24 (1&2). Poetry.
- Silook, Susie (2011) "Ungipamsuuka: My Story." The Alaska Quarterly Review 28 (1&2). Memoir as Drama.
