= Brenda Mallory (artist) =

Native American mixed-media artist

- Born: 1955 (age 69–70); Oklahoma, United States
- Education: B.A. in Linguistics & English, University of California Los Angeles; B.F.A. in General Fine Art, Pacific Northwest College of Art
- Known for: recycle art, installation, sculpture
- Website: www.brendamallory.com

Brenda Mallory (born 1955) is a Native American visual/sculpture/mixed media/installation artist and a member of the Cherokee Nation. Her artwork ranges from small decorations to large sculptures and utilizes a variety of materials such as handmade papers, cloth, wax, and recycled objects.

== Personal life and education ==
Mallory was born in 1955 and grew up in northeastern Oklahoma. She watched her father's crafting techniques of binding objects together with baling wires, which she credits as an influence in her art: "especially slapdash aesthetics of the hard connections of the nuts and bolts".

She attended the University of California, Los Angeles, where she earned a B.A. in Linguistics & English and went on to earn a B.F.A. in General Fine Arts from the Pacific Northwest College of Art.

== Career ==
Mallory has described herself as a "late-bloomer as a self-employed artist", as she started exhibiting as an artist in 2002. She has participated in several solo and group art exhibitions and has received multiple grants and residencies.

In 1993 Mallory and Karen Paule co-founded the company GladRags, as Mallory came up with the idea of the company after looking at her daughter's reusable diapers. GladRags produces washable, reusable menstrual pads and Mallory has noted that in 2000 she incorporated extraneous pieces of the pads into one of her class assignments after dipping them in wax, stating that it " has the malleability of clay but not the fragility. It also has a mysterious quality; people look at it and don’t know what it is". She later sold GladRags in 2011 to Tracy Puhl.

Mallory has organized several exhibitions and has occasionally served as an instructor of contemporary art and a mentor.

== Artworks ==
“I think art often expresses meanings that words cannot. Words are definite, and once uttered, a thought is concretized, whereas images reach a part of the brain where the viewer becomes a participant in making meaning depending on the information they bring from their own brain. There can be multiple and deeply embedded meanings that are not always obvious.” ––––Brenda Mallory

Mallory works with mixed media, she uses mostly natural materials to create geometric shapes with loud colors and forms that join with wires, becoming an abstract, multi-surfaced, and complicated product. Though Brenda Mallory's subjects and designs were heavily influenced by her father, but she also is interested in subjects like nature, culture, society, and history. Her artwork contains a lot of symbolism and metaphors, She expresses her values and wishes, make new discoveries through her art. Overall, Mallory has two main subjects she has been focusing on throughout her life as an artist.

=== Recurring Chapters in the Book of Inevitable Outcomes ===
Ultimately, Mallory communicates through the symbolisms, she implies her concerns about the health of the environment and the interactions between humans and nature. One other important topic of Mallory's work is using art to support individuals, families, and cultures that suffer from outside forceful influences. Overall, Mallory's main topic with her work is to improve the conditions of mistreated people and nature by drawing attention with her artwork. For example, Figure 1 captures an installation on Mallory's 2017 art exhibition "connecting lines". Mallory created Recurring Chapters in the Book of Inevitable Outcomes when she got selected to be in the Eiteljorg Fellowship exhibition in 2015. The dark unsymmetrical tall shapes scattered around but yet again joined by wires, surrounded by colorful geometric spike-shaped forms placed on the floor and the wall. Mallory's inspiration of this piece of art was from the history of the Cherokee culture. Mallory has always felt disconnected from her culture. Youth memories inspired her to create the installations. The installation is inspired by Cherokee history, and expresses ideas about disruption, repair, and renewal.

=== Reclaimed and reformed ===
Mallory was already known for using recycled and used materials in her artwork in support of the environment, she also reuses old artworks and projects as materials for new projects. The project "reclaimed and reformed" was created by Mallory when she stayed as a resident for 5 months at the art institution GLEAN. This project contains a collection of new and old artworks transformed largely from discarded trash found in a local dumpster. Some artworks from this collection were displayed in exhibition Intricate Form at the Museum of Art Fort Collins from January 18 – March 17, 2019. The project contains small sections of artworks made from similar materials. Such as Firehose Experiment, indicating artworks made from firehoses; similarly, Reformed Packings indicating artworks created by packing materials, etcetera.

== Select exhibitions ==
=== Single and double exhibitions ===
- 2018 "Recurring Chapters in the Book of Inevitable Outcomes" Armory Theatre; Portland, Oregon
- 2016 "A Further Gleaning", North View Gallery in Portland Community College, Portland, OR (February 22 - March 19)
- 2015 "Recurring Chapters in the Book of Inevitable Outcomes" Grants Pass Art Museum (April 2 - May 29)
- 2011 "Mechanics of Hither and Yon", Portland International Airport
- 2010 "Constrain to Vertical" held in Doppler PDX, Portland, Oregon (March 4–13)

=== Double exhibitions ===
- 2019 "Intricate Forms", with Sydney Pursel; Ucross Native American Fellowship Exhibition. Ucross, Wyoming
- 2017 "Connecting Lines", with Luzene Hill. Portland Art Museum, Portland, Oregon (March 11 - October 29, 2017)
- 2014 "Lines and Forms", with Tor Archer, Julie Nester Gallery, Park City, Utah (July 5 - July 22)
- 2013 "Reiterations and Rifts", with ORGANIC, Butters Gallery. Portland, Oregon(July 3 - July 27)

=== Group exhibitions ===
- 2018 "Morphologies", with Mary Campbell, Benjamin Mefford, and Jenene Nagy, c3:initiative, Portland, Oregon (March 31 - May 5)
- 2016 "Golden Spot Award Artists in Residence", Crow's Shadow Institute of the Arts, Pendleton, Oregon
- 2017 "Symmetry Breaking", with Jovencio de la Paz, Jo Hamilton, Emily Counts, Emily Nachison, Anya Kivarkis, Kristen Miller, and Jane Schiffhauer, Marylhurst University Art Gym, Marylhurst, Oregon (October 3 - December 10)

=== Permanent collections ===
- Hallie Ford Museum of Art Salem, Oregon
- Eiteljorg Museum, Indiana

== Awards, grants and residencies ==
=== Grants ===
- 2019, Career Opportunity Grant, Oregon Arts Commission & Ford Family Foundation
- 2016, Individual Artist Project Grant, Regional Arts and Culture Council, Portland, OR
- 2013, Career Opportunity Grant, Oregon Arts Commission & Ford Family Foundation
- 2008, Career Opportunity Grant, Oregon Arts Commission
- 2007, Professional Development Grant, Regional Arts, and Culture Council Emergency Funds Grant, Foundation for Contemporary Art, NY
- 2005, Individual Artist Project Grant, Regional Arts and Culture Council, Portland, OR

=== Awards ===
- 2018 Ucross Foundation Fellowship for Native American Visual Artist, Clearmont, WY
- 2016 National Artist Fellowship
- 2016 Visual Arts Fellowship, Native Arts and Culture Council, Vancouver, WA
- 2015 Contemporary Native Artist Fellowship, with Luzene Hill, Da-ka-xeen Mehner, and Holly Wilson. The exhibition was held in the "Eiteljorg Museum of American Indians and Western Art" Indianapolis, Indiana. from November 14 until February 28, 2016.

=== Residencies ===
Mallory has participated in artist residencies including Ucross, Anderson Ranch, Crow's Shadow Institute of the Arts, Glean, Bullseye Glass, and Signal Fire Outpost, and the Jordan Schnitzer Printmaking Residency at Sitka Center for the Arts.

- 2019 Jordan Schnitzer Printmaking Residency at Sitka Center for Art & Ecology, Otis, OR
- 2018 Signal Fire Outpost Residency, Portland, OR
- 2018 Bullseye Glass Residency, Portland, OR
- 2018 Research Residency, Design Collaborator with CKM&A, National Center for Choreography, Akron, Ohio
- 2017 Pulp & Deckle Papermaking Residency, Portland, OR
- 2017 Map(ing) Fellowship Residency, Arizona State University, Tempe, AZ
- 2016 Golden Spot Residency, Crow's Shadow Institute, Pendleton, OR
- 2015 Artist Residency, Glean/Recology, Portland, OR
- 2013 Residency in Sculpture, Anderson Ranch Art Center, Colorado
- 2005 Residency in Sculpture, PNCA, Portland, OR
