= Matthew Kirk =

American artist (born 1978)

- Born: January 31, 1978 (age 48); Ganado, Arizona
- Known for: Painting, sculpture

Matthew Kirk is an American artist.

== Early life and education ==
Matthew Kirk was born in Ganado, Arizona and is an enrolled member of the Navajo Nation. As a child he moved to Wisconsin with his mother where he lived until moving to Queens in 2006. Kirk has no formal art training and did not attend college or an MFA program. He worked for over a decade as an art handler in New York City.

== Art career ==
Kirk is known for his abstract paintings, drawing on his broad field of visual references from his career as an art handler and often incorporating Navajo petroglyphs. His choice of media is also influenced by his first career as an art handler–often incorporate insulation foam, padding, wires, and other materials that are essential to the trade. Kirk frequently utilizes recycled materials found on the street in New York City. Bradley Walker Tomlin, Cy Twombly, Joseph Hart, Jackson Pollock, Vasily Kandinsky have all been cited as references. In a profile with Modern Painters Magazine, Kirk states that he is particularly interested in the visuals found in "turn of the century Navajo rugs."

=== Fellowships and residencies ===
In 2019 Kirk was awarded the Eiteljorg Contemporary Art Fellowship in Indianapolis, IN.

=== Public collections ===
Matthew Kirk is in the following public collections:

- The Eiteljorg Museum, Indianapolis, IN
- Forge Collection, Tagkhanic, NY
- OZ Art, Bentonville, AR
- TD Bank Collection, Toronto / NY Bank of America Collection
