= Larry McNeil (photographer) =

- Born: Larry Tee Harbor Jackson McNeil; May 12, 1955 (age 71); Juneau, Alaska, United States
- Citizenship: Tlingit and American
- Known for: Photography, printmaking
- Relatives: Da-ka-xeen Mehner, nephew
- Website: larrymcneil.com

Larry McNeil (born Larry Tee Harbor Jackson McNeil) is a Native American photographer and printmaker. His photographs range on subjects and formats from realist portraits to tribal elders, from abstract cityscapes to electronic manipulations of tribal environments. His images are considered personally meaningful as they are representative of tribal realities and highlight the sensitivity behind the representation of Native Americans.

== Early life and education ==
Larry McNeil was born in Juneau, Alaska on May 12, 1955, into the Killer Whale House, Keet Hit, of the Northern Tlingit and was raised in both Juneau and Anchorage, Alaska. This made him a member of both the Tlingit and Nisga'a tribes. He received his education from Brooks Institute School of Photographic Art and Science in Santa Barbara, California.

== Career ==
Larry McNeil describes himself as a product of both the traditional Tlingit culture and mainstream North America, with an emphasis on the Tlingit aspect. In 1983, he worked with Alaska Native Foundation and produced Yupik Eskimo women weaving distinctive grass baskets. Later in 1986, he created seventeen portraits of tribal clan leaders in Northwest Arctic School District. In the same year, he was nominated as vice-president of the Native Indian/Inuit Photographers Association; he was also an instructor at the Institute of American Indian Arts as well as a commercial photographer.

McNeil is currently an associate professor of photography at Boise State University.

=== Works ===
McNeil's sequence of photographs titled Fly By Night Mythology was well received. Emeritus Professor of American Literature, Mick Gidley, commented that the sequence "represents both recovery of history and, photographically, creation through revision" in a manner that "frames in photographs - both old and new - a national myth that incorporates the first Americans". The sequence features a series of archive photos from McNeil's family history of growing up in Anglo-American culture juxtaposed with images of his Tlingit tribe members, as a representation of his own mixed ancestry and of the relationship between the two histories. The early photographs in the work are also a symbolic representation of traditional Tlingit stories, featuring examples of "Raven the Changeling and Trickster playing the protagonist", along with representations of interactions between Chief Pontiac and George Washington.

== Honors and awards ==
- 1983: Award of Excellence, Public Relations Society of America
- 1983-86: Merit Award, Advertising Federation of America
- 1992: Outstanding Photographic Technical Quality and Outstanding Outdoor Photography, Native Inuit Photography Association
- 2006: "All Roads" Photography Award, National Geographic

== See also ==
- Da-ka-xeen Mehner
