= Teresa Marshall =

Canadian artist

Teresa Marshall (1962 – 2026) was a Canadian Mi'kmaw (L'nu) multidisciplinary artist associated with Millbrook First Nation in Nova Scotia. Her work was diverse in form, including installation art, sculpture, painting, textiles and writing. Through it, she explored Canadian colonial policy, Indigenous representation as well as the transmission of Mi'kmaq cultural knowledge and the relationship between objects and political power.

Her works include Elitekey (1990), Peace, Order, and Good Government (1993), Bering Strait Jacket #1 (1994), Meta Sage (1995), Band Stands (1997), Mi'kmaq Universe (2005) and Rising Red Hoods (2018).

Marshall died at her home in Millbrook, Nova Scotia in October 2026.

== Education ==
Marshall's father was a part of the military and for this reason she attended school on the bases. This is where she would go to school during the year to get her education and then would go to the reserve during the summer. Experiencing both communities allowed her to gain knowledge of both the indigenous and non-indigenous world. This has helped her build perspective, which she shows through her artwork.

After primary and secondary education Marshall studied at the Nova Scotia College of Art and Design (NSCAD).Then, after her time at NSCAD, she continued to study theater at Dalhousie University.

== Artworks ==
=== Hide and Seek The Souls You Keep Locked Away in God's Closet ===
This piece is from Marshall's exhibition Red Rising Hoods at the Cape Breton University Art Gallery. The art piece shows a church window that has nine coffins inside of it. Once opened the coffins have red figures inside of them. The red figures represent the Mi'kmaq people, during the scalping bounties, who died for the hunting of their scalps for a sum of money. Then over the window, shutters hang and close to represent the lost memory the Canadian government has for the crime made against the First Nations people.

=== Elitekey ===
This piece was located at the National Gallery of Canada Land, Spirit, and Power Exhibition. For this installation Marshall created three statues that represent the absence of communication between the Canadian Army and the Mohawk people in the year 1990. The installation includes three statues made of concrete. One of a half raised Canadian flag that had a cut out of the maple leaf. Diagonal to it was a figure wearing traditional clothing of the Native group, representing a person of that culture but had no body parts with the clothing. Between the two sculptures was a canoe, that for the Mohawks was an important symbol of hope. However, when the conflict in 1990 happened between the Mohawks and the Canadian government, that symbol of hope turned into something that would be used against them. Marshall wanted to showcase the suppression the Canadian government put upon the First Nations people and the injustices done to them. Which is why the statue of the flag shows it half raised with the missing maple leaf.

=== Meta Sage ===
The Meta Sage is a sculpture of a very large, four feet tall, thread spool. The sculpture includes the thread spool, four needles, and thread. The materials used for the spool itself include yellow cedar wood, and tobacco. The four needles each at a length of three feet were made of many types of stone. These stones include black granite, red sandstone, white marble, and yellow limestone. With thread connecting the spool and four needles, the artwork is laid out by the needles circling the spool.

Marshall explains that the sculpture was inspired by the Mi'kmaq legend that tells the migration story of people. The spool was carved to represent the medicine wheels described in the story. The sculpture was also used to tell an important story involving women. The sculpture was an object that women would use throughout their daily work. It symbolizes the history of these women and the conversations that they would tell each other as they working on the different types materials.

=== Bering Strait Jacket ===
The Bering Strait Jacket is a clothing art piece that Marshall created in 1993. It is a dark blue, pin-stripped, size 42 jacket. The sleeves on the jacket are significantly long, and have buckles on them that were put on to embody a strait jacket. On the silk lining of the jacket is a passage from the 1752 Indian Treaty. The treaty was made to stop the killings of the Mi'kmaq people for their territory. Before the treaty was made colonizers invaded the Mi'kmaq people's land and were ordered to kill them to take control of their territory. Even after the treaty was formed colonizers continued to take over Mi'kmaq people's land and disassembled their way of life. Thus, the symbolism of the restraint buckles Marshall created, to show the colonizers history of restricting and decolonizing Mi'kmaq and native groups.

On the contrary, Marshall also intended for the jacket to have a second meaning as well. The jacket is designed similarly to ones of colonizing authority and the ones the Europeans would gift to the Mi'kmaq people. For this reason the women would take these jackets and embellish them with beads and other traditional aesthetics. They would refurbish the jackets with Indian aesthetics and resell them back to the Europeans as a sign of resilience against the culture forced upon them.

== Exhibitions ==
- Red Rising Hoods: Cape Breton University Art Gallery (2018)
- 75 Years of Collecting: First Nations: Myths and Realities: Vancouver Art Gallery (2006)
- Recollect: Vancouver Art Gallery (1999-2000)
- Topographies: Aspects of Recent B.C. Art: Vancouver Art Gallery (1996-1997)
- Band Strands: Thunder Bay Art Gallery (1997)
- The Deportment of Indian Affairs: Confederation Centre Art Gallery and A Space (1995)
- Land, Spirit, Power: The National Gallery of Canada (1992)

== Collections ==
- Vancouver Art Gallery
- Thunder Bay Art Gallery
- Cape Breton University Art Gallery
- Confederation Centre Art Gallery
- National Gallery of Canada

== Honors and awards ==
- Eiteljorg Contemporary Art Fellowship (After The Storm) 2001

== See also ==
- First Nations people
- Neocolonialism
- Native American Art
