= Will Wilson (photographer) =

Native American photographer (born 1969)

- Born: William Wilson; 1969 (age 56–57); San Francisco, California, U.S.
- Known for: Photography
- Awards: Eiteljorg Museum Native American Fine Art Fellowship (2007), awarded grant from the Joan Mitchell Foundation (2010)
- Website: http://willwilson.photoshelter.com

William Wilson (born 1969) is a Native American photographer and a citizen of the Navajo Nation.

== Early life and education ==
Wilson was born in San Francisco in 1969, but spent his childhood growing up on the Navajo Nation. He attended the government boarding school in Tuba City through 8th grade and was then plucked from the reservation and sent to Northfield Mount Hermon School in Massachusetts with a scholarship from the "A Better Chance (ABC)" Foundation. He attended Oberlin College as an undergraduate with a major in studio art and art history, and obtained a Master's of Fine Arts in photography at the University of New Mexico.

He has been an artist-in-residence at the School for Advanced Research.

== Career ==
Since 2012, Wilson had been involved in the creation of a project titled the Critical Indigenous Photographic Exchange (CIPX). Inviting a number of indigenous artists and other professionals, they are all involved in the production of various pieces of art depicting indigenous peoples that pose for them. Wilson, himself, uses an "old fashioned, large format camera and the historic wet plate collodion process" in order to create photos that are reflective of historic photographs. The resulting studio photos from him and the other artists have been featured in a number of museums, including the Denver Museum of Art, the National Museum of the American Indian, and the New Mexico Museum of Art.

In 2014, Wilson's work was included in an exhibition of contemporary Native American Photography, As We See It, alongside Matika Wilbur, Tom Jones, Larry McNeil, and Shelly Niro, among others. The exhibition traveled through Russia and in 2016 and 2017, it will visit the American West. In February 2016, Wilson's work was included as a counterpoint to a large show of Edward Curtis photographs at the Portland Art Museum. In 2017, he won the New Mexico Governor’s Excellence in Art Award.

Wilson previously taught at the Institute of American Indian Arts, Oberlin, University of Arizona, and Santa Fe Community College. In 2020, he was Artist-in-Residence at Yale University Art Gallery. He is currently associate professor in the Department of Studio Art (Photography & Media), at the University of Texas at Austin.
