= C. Maxx Stevens =

C. Maxx Stevens (born 1951) is an installation artist from the Seminole/Mvskoke Nation of Oklahoma. She often uses found objects and ephemera in her work which is centered on the concept of memories and stories. Stevens’ work has been described as “gritty and “both haunting and familiar” and prior installations have focused on the contemporary Native American experience such as the harmful effects of diabetes in Native American communities.

== Background ==
She earned an associate degree from Haskell Indian Junior College, a Bachelor of Arts from Wichita State University, and a Master of Fine Arts from Indiana University Bloomington.

Stevens was the academic dean in the Center for Arts and Cultural Studies at the Institute of American Indian Arts in Santa Fe, New Mexico, from 2002 to 2005. She is an assistant professor of art at the University of Colorado Boulder, where she also serves as foundation arts director for the art and art history department.

== Exhibitions ==
- House of Memory. November 10, 2012 – June 16, 2013. George Gustav Heye Center of the National Museum of the American Indian, New York City.
- Re-Riding History: From the Southern Plains to the Matanzas Bay. 2015–2018.
