= Da-ka-xeen Mehner =

Tlingit/Nisga'a visual artist

Da-ka-xeen Mehner (born 1970) is a Tlingit/Nisga'a American visual artist whose work includes photography and multimedia installations that incorporate video, sculpture and sound.

== Early life and education ==
Mehner was born in Fairbanks, Alaska to an American father and a Tlingit/Nisga'a mother. He was raised in two cultures; by his mother in Anchorage as an "urban Native" and in Fairbanks as a "rural hippie". His extended family includes several artists, and he was particularly influenced by the photographer Larry McNeil, who is his uncle. In 1990, he left Alaska and moved to Santa Fe, New Mexico to pursue an education at the Institute of American Indian Arts where he received an AA degree in 1992. He received a BFA from the University of New Mexico in 2003, and an MFA from the University of Alaska, Fairbanks in 2007. His student work explored themes that included the environment, death and destruction.

== Work ==
Mehner works in photography and installations that combine video, sculpture and sound. His work examines Native American identity and explorations of the self as a cross-cultural person.

He has had solo exhibitions at the State Museum of Alaska, the Museum of the Institute of American Indian Arts, the Anchorage Museum among other venues.

He is currently Professor of Native Art at the University of Alaska, Fairbanks, where he is the director of the Native Arts Center.

== Awards ==
In 2014 Mehner was awarded with a fellowship from the Native Arts and Cultures Foundation. In 2015, he was named a fellow by United States Artists in conjunction with the Rasmuson Foundation. Also in 2015 he received a Eiteljorg Contemporary Art Fellowship.

== Collections ==
Mehner's work is held in the collections of the University of Alaska Museum of the North, the Anchorage Museum of History and Art, the Museum of Contemporary Native Arts, the Alaska State Museum, and the C.N. Gorman Museum. The National Gallery of Canada holds his photographic work in their permanent collection.

== See also ==
- Nicholas Galanin
- Nathan Jackson
