= St. Ignatius Mission =

Historic church in Montana, United States

- U.S. National Register of Historic Places
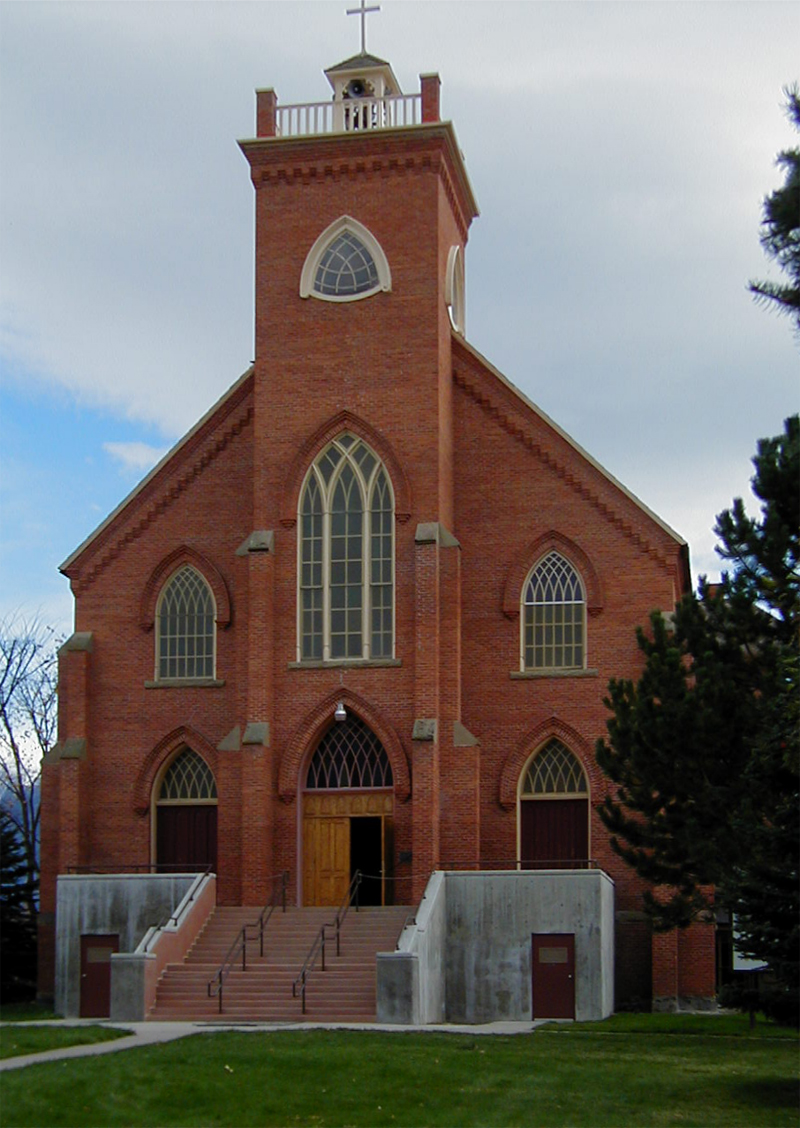
- St. Ignatius Mission, St. Ignatius, Montana

- Location within Montana Location within the United States
- Location: approximately 1/8 mile southeast of US Highway 93 in St. Ignatius, Montana
- Coordinates: 47°18′54″N 114°6′7″W
- Area: 2 acres (0.81 ha)
- Built: 1891–1893
- Architect: Brother Joseph Carignano
- NRHP reference No.: 73001053
- Added to NRHP: June 19, 1973

The St. Ignatius Mission is a landmark Catholic mission located in St. Ignatius, Montana. It was founded in 1854 by Jesuit priests Pierre-Jean De Smet and Adrian Hoecken. The current mission church was built between 1891 and 1893, and listed on the National Register of Historic Places in 1973.

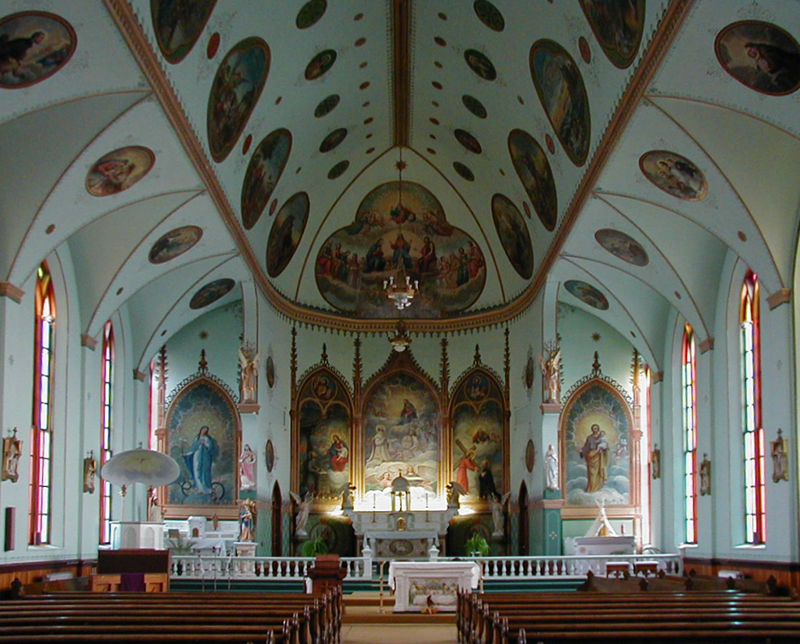
Interior, St. Ignatius Mission

The mission church serves the St. Ignatius parish within the Missoula Deanery of the Roman Catholic Diocese of Helena.

== Architecture ==
The mission church is a simplified, vernacular example of Gothic revival architecture constructed of bricks made from native clay. The most exceptional feature of the interior are the 58 murals painted by Brother Joseph Carignano, an untrained artist who worked as a cook in the mission. The murals include depictions of Christian imagery mixed with representations of the Salish belief system. The church is 120 by 60 feet (37 m × 18 m) in plan and its belfry is nearly 100 feet (30 m) high.
