= Jaune Quick-to-See Smith =

Native American painter and printmaker (1940–2025)

- Jaune Quick-to-See Smith, photograph by Thomas King
- Born: January 15, 1940; St. Ignatius Mission, Flathead Reservation, Montana, U.S.
- Died: January 24, 2025 (aged 85); Corrales, New Mexico, U.S.
- Citizenship: Confederated Salish and Kootenai Tribes, American
- Education: Framingham State College; University of New Mexico; Olympic College
- Known for: Painting, printmaking
- Website: jaunequick-to-seesmith.com

Jaune Quick-to-See Smith (/ʒɑːn/ zhahn; January 15, 1940 – January 24, 2025) was a Native American visual artist and curator. She was an enrolled citizen of the Confederated Salish and Kootenai Tribes and was also of Métis and Shoshone descent. She was an educator, storyteller, art advocate, and political activist. In her five-decades-long career, Smith gained a reputation for her prolific work, being featured in over 50 solo exhibitions and curating more than 30 exhibitions. Her work draws from a Native worldview and comments on American Indian identity, histories of oppression, and environmental issues.

In the mid-1970s, Smith gained prominence as a painter and printmaker, and later advanced her style with collage, drawing, and mixed media. Her works have been widely exhibited and many are in the permanent collections of prominent art museums including the Museum of Modern Art, the Whitney Museum of American Art, the Metropolitan Museum of Art, Denver Art Museum, Modern Art Museum of Fort Worth, and the Walker Art Center as well as the Smithsonian American Art Museum and the National Museum of Women in the Arts, both in the District of Columbia. Her work has also been collected by New Mexico Museum of Art (Santa Fe) and Albuquerque Museum, both located in a landscape that has continually served as one of her greatest sources of inspiration. In 2020, the National Gallery of Art bought her painting I See Red: Target (1992), which was the first painting on canvas by a Native American artist in the gallery.

== Early life ==
Jaune Quick-to-See Smith was born on January 15, 1940, in St. Ignatius Mission, a small town on the Flathead Reservation on the Confederated Salish and Kootenai Indian Reservation, Montana. Her first name, Jaune, means "yellow" in French; Smith has Métis ancestry. Her Indian name, "Quick-to-See," was given to her by her Shoshone grandmother as a sign of an ability to grasp things readily.

As a child, Smith had an itinerant life. Her father, a single parent who traded horses and participated in rodeos, frequently moved among several reservations for his occupation. As a result, Jaune lived in various places of the Pacific Northwest and California. Growing up in poverty, Smith worked alongside migrant workers in a Seattle farming community when she was between eight and fifteen years old when school was not in session.

However, Smith knew very early on that she wanted to be an artist. She remembered drawing on the ground with sticks as a four-year old as an early expression of her future career. She fondly recalled the first time she encountered tempera paints and crayons in first grade:

"I loved the smell of them. It was a real awakening. I made a painting of children dancing around Mount Rainier. My teacher raved about it. Then with Valentine's Day approaching, I painted red hearts all over the sky. ... I see it as my first abstract painting."

== Education ==
In 1958, Smith began her formal art education in Washington State, enrolling at Olympic College in Bremerton, from which she earned an associate of arts degree in 1960. and taking classes at the University of Washington in Seattle. Her education, however, was interrupted because she had to support herself through various jobs as a waitress, Head Start teacher, factory worker, domestic, librarian, janitor, veterinary assistant, and secretary. In 1976, she completed a bachelor's degree in Art Education from Framingham State College, Massachusetts, and then moved to Albuquerque, New Mexico, to start graduate school at the University of New Mexico (UNM). Her initial attraction to the university was its comprehensive Native American studies program, but after applying three times and being successively turned down, she decided to continue taking classes and making art. After an eventual exhibition at the Kornblee Gallery in New York City and its review in Art in America, she was finally accepted into the Department of Fine Arts at UNM where in 1980 she graduated with a Masters in Art. This liberal arts education formally introduced her to studies on the classical and contemporary arts, focusing on European and American artistic practices throughout the millennia, which served as her most influential point of access to the contemporary global art world.

From this background of her childhood and formal arts education, Smith negotiated Native and non-Native societies by navigating, merging, and being inspired by diverse cultures. She produced art that "follows the journey of [her] life as [she moves] through public art projects, collaborations, printmaking, traveling, curating, lecturing and tribal activities." This work serves as a mode of visual communication, which she creatively and consciously composes in layers to bridge gaps between these two worlds and to educate about social, political and environmental issues existing deeper than the surface.

== Artistic style ==
Smith began creating complex abstract paintings and lithographs in the 1970s. She employed a wide variety of media, working in painting, printmaking and richly textured mixed media pieces. Her collage elements, such as commercial slogans, sign-like petroglyphs, rough drawing, and the inclusion and layering of text, were used to further complex visions borne of the artist's personal experience. Her works contain strong, insistent socio-political commentary that speaks to past and present cultural appropriation and abuse, while identifying the continued significance of the Native American peoples. She addressed contemporary tribal politics, human rights and environmental issues with humor. Smith was known internationally for her philosophically centered work regarding her strong cultural beliefs and political activism.

Smith's collaborative public artworks include the terrazzo floor design in the Great Hall of the Denver Airport; an in-situ sculpture piece in Yerba Buena Gardens, San Francisco; and a mile-long sidewalk history trail in West Seattle.

=== 1980s ===
August Encampment (1988–1989) at the Metropolitan Museum of Art in 2022

Smith's initial mature work consisted of abstract landscapes, began in the 1970s and carried into the 1980s. Her landscapes often included pictographic symbolism and was considered a form of self-portraiture; Gregory Galligan explains in Arts Magazine in 1986, "each of these works distills decades of personal memory, collective consciousness, and historical awareness into a cogent pictorial synthesis." The landscapes often make use of representations of horses, teepees, humans, antelopes, etc.

These paintings touch on the alienation of the American Indian in modern culture, by acting as a sum of the past and something new altogether. She did this by beginning to saturate her work with the style of Abstract Expressionists. Smith explained, "I look at line, form, color, texture, etc., in contemporary art as well as viewing old Indian artifacts the same way. With this I make parallels from the old world to contemporary art. A Hunkpapa drum become a Rothko painting; ledger-book symbols become Cy Twombly; a Naskaspi bag is Paul Klee; a Blackfoot robe, Agnes Martin; beadwork color is Josef Albers; a parfleche is Frank Stella; design is Vasarely's positive and negative space."

=== 1990s ===
I See Red: Target (1992) at the National Gallery of Art in 2022

In the 1990s, Smith began her I See Red series, which she continued on and off for the rest of her life. Paintings in this series were initially exhibited at Bernice Steinbaum Gallery in 1992, in conjunction with protests regarding the Columbian quincentenary. As Erin Valentino describes in Third Text in 1997, "The paintings in this series employ numerous kinds of imagery from an abundance of sources and in a variety of associations: high, mass, consumer, popular, national, mainstream and vernacular cultures, avant-garde (modernist) imagery and so-called Indian imagery in the form of found objects, photographs, scientific illustrations, fabric swatches, bumper stickers, maps, cartoon imagery, advertisements, newspaper cut-outs and visual quotations of her own work, to name some." Here, she juxtaposes stereotypical commodification of native American cultures with visual reminders of their colonizer's legacies. The style of these paintings, with their collage, layered, and misty environments, have been compared to the techniques and imagery of Robert Rauschenberg and Jasper Johns. Likewise, their pop-art reminiscent subject matter references the work of Andy Warhol.

=== 2000s ===
Tribal Map (2000–2001) at the Walter E. Washington Convention Center in Washington, DC

Smith consistently addressed respect for nature, animals, and human kind. Her interest in these topics lay in her exploration of the adverse socio-cultural circumstances (including health, sovereignty, and rights) created for Native Americans by the government. She put her studies into practice by avoiding toxic art supplies and minimizing excessive art storage space.

Smith's paintings contained contemporary cultural signifiers and collaged elements. References to the Lone Ranger, Tonto, Snow White, Altoids, Krispy Kreme, Fritos, etc., all served to critique the rampant consumerism of American culture, and how this culture benefits from the exploitation of Native American cultures. She used humor in a cartoonish way to bemoan the corruption of nature and mock the shallowness of contemporary culture.

=== Nomad Art Manifesto ===
An environmentalist, Smith often critiqued the pollution created through art-making such as toxic materials, excessive storage space, and extensive shipping. The Nomad Art Manifesto, designed based on the aesthetic of parfleches, consists of squares carrying messages about the environment and Indian life, made entirely from biodegradable materials.

The Nomad Art Manifesto:

- Nomad Art is made with biodegradable materials
- Nomad Art can be recycled
- Nomad Art can be folded and sent as a small parcel
- Nomad Art can be stored on a bookshelf, which saves space
- Nomad Art does not need to be framed
- Nomad Art is convenient for countries which may be disbanding or reforming
- Nomad Art is for the new diaspora age.

== Personal life and death ==
Smith's son, Neal Ambrose-Smith, is a contemporary painter, printmaker, sculptor and educator.

Smith died from pancreatic cancer in Corrales, New Mexico, on January 24, 2025, at the age of 85.

== Awards and honors ==
Smith received attention for her work as an artist, educator, art advocate, and political activist throughout her career and she received multiple honors, awards and fellowships.

Smith was awarded several honorary degrees. These include doctorates in art granted by the Minneapolis College of Art and Design in 1992, the Pennsylvania Academy of the Fine Arts in 1998, Massachusetts College of Art in 2003, and University of New Mexico in 2008; a professorship in art by Washington University in St. Louis in 1989; and, a degree in Native American Studies by Salish Kootenai College, Pablo, Montana in 2015.

Among lifetime achievement awards acknowledging dedication to her career, she received the Women's Caucus for Art Award in the Visual Arts in 1997, the College Art Association Committee on Women in the Arts Award in 2002, and the Woodson Foundation Award in 2014 as well as being inducted into the National Academy of Design in 2011. She has also been the recipient of the Women's Vision Award for the National Women's History Project in Women's Art in 2008 and the Visionary Woman Award from Moore College of Art & Design in 2011. Other notable awards throughout the years have been the Wallace Stegner Award for art of the American West in 1995, the Joan Mitchell Foundation Award in 1996 to archive her work through the Painters Grant, the Eiteljorg Museum Fellowship for Native American Fine Art in its inaugural year of 1999, ArtTable award in 2011, the Switzer Distinguished Artist Award in 2012, and a United States Artists fellowship in 2020.

Her adoptive state of New Mexico has also lauded her contribution to the arts and local community with praise and continuous recognition over the decades. This began early in her state residency (with her first career honor) when she was named one of "80 Professional Women to Watch in the 1980s" by New Mexico Women's Political Caucus for her local civic engagement in 1979. Subsequent esteemed credits of distinction are: SITE Santa Fe fellowship award in 1995; the New Mexico Governor's Outstanding New Mexico Woman's Award and the New Mexico Governor's Award for Excellence in the Arts (Allan Houser Memorial Award) both in 2005; the Living Artist of Distinction award by the Georgia O'Keeffe Museum in 2012; the aforementioned doctorate from University of New Mexico (Albuquerque) and the Woodson Foundation award in Santa Fe. Smith was also admitted to the New Mexico Women's Hall of Fame in 2014.

== Exhibitions ==
Smith participated in more than 50 solo shows in the United States and internationally. Her solo shows included Jaune Quick-to-See Smith (1979), Kornblee Gallery, New York; Parameters Series (1993), Chrysler Museum of Art, Norfolk, Virginia; Jaune Quick-to-See Smith: Poet in Paint (2001), Neuberger Museum of Art, Purchase, New York; Jaune Quick-to-See Smith: Made in America (2003–2009), originating at Belger Arts Center, Kansas City, Missouri; “Jaune Quick-to-See Smith: Landscapes of an American Modernist” (2012) Georgia O’Keeffe Museum, Santa Fe, New Mexico; and Jaune Quick-to-See Smith: In the Footsteps of My Ancestors (2017–2019), originating at Yellowstone Art Museum, Billings, Montana. Jaune Quick-to-See Smith: Memory Map, the largest survey of the artist's oeuvre to date, opened at the Whitney Museum of American Art in New York in 2023, making Smith the first Native American artist to have a solo retrospective at the Whitney; The exhibit traveled to the Modern Art Museum of Fort Worth.

She also participated in a large array of group exhibitions, including the 48th Venice Biennale (1999) and the Havana Biennial (2009).

Smith curated more than 30 exhibitions. In 2023, she curated an exhibition of contemporary art by Native American artists at the National Gallery of Art in Washington, D.C., becoming the first artist to curate an exhibition at the National Gallery. The exhibition, The Land Carries our Ancestors: Contemporary Art by Native Americans, featured the work of an intergenerational group of almost 50 Native artists from across the United States.

Her work was included in the 2024 exhibition Making Their Mark: Works from the Shah Garg Collection at the Berkeley Art Museum and Pacific Film Archive (BAMPFA).

From May 3, 2024–August 3, 2025, the Saint Louis Art Museum exhibited Jaune Quick-to-See Smith, displaying works from the Museum’s collection, including State Names Map: Cahokia and Trade Canoe: Cahokia, a painting and sculpture Smith created for the Counterpublic triennial in St. Louis in 2023.

From February 1–December 21, 2025, the Zimmerli Art Museum at Rutgers University, exhibited Smith’s final curatorial project, Indigenous Identities: Here, Now & Always. The exhibit included “over 100 works across a range of media, the exhibition explores the multiplicities of indigeneity through the diverse practices of 97 artists—representing 74 Indigenous nations and communities across the United States.” In conjunction with Indigenous Identities: Here, Now & Always, the Zimmerli exhibited Hope with Humor: Works by Jaune Quick-To-See Smith from the Collection which displayed paintings and prints from the Zimmerli's permanent collection.

== Notable works in public collections ==
- Nirada #16 (1982), Fine Arts Museums of San Francisco
- The Courthouse Steps (1986), Albuquerque Museum, New Mexico
- August Encampment (1989–1999), Metropolitan Museum of Art, New York
- Salish Spring (Montana Memories Series) (1988–1989), Missoula Art Museum, Montana
- Tamarack (1989), Birmingham Museum of Art, Alabama
- Sources of Strength (1990), Minneapolis Institute of Art
- I See Red: Herd (1992), Detroit Institute of Arts
- I See Red: Salmon Recovery? (1992), Fralin Museum of Art, Charlottesville, Virginia
- I See Red: Target (1992), National Gallery of Art, Washington, D.C.
- Mischief, Indian Land Series (1992), Crystal Bridges Museum of American Art, Bentonville, Arkansas
- The Red Mean: Self Portrait (1992), Smith College Museum of Art, Northampton, Massachusetts
- Trade (Gifts for Trading Land with White People) (1992), Chrysler Museum of Art, Norfolk, Virginia
- Fish For a Lifetime (1993–1994), Museum of Modern Art, New York
- The Vanishing American (1994), Whitney Museum of American Art, New York
- Genesis (1995), High Museum of Art, Atlanta
- I See Red: Migration (1995), Saint Louis Art Museum
- All American (1996), Chazen Museum of Art, Madison, Wisconsin
- I See Red: Flathead Vest (1996), Colby College Museum of Art, Waterville, Maine
- Survival (1996), Cleveland Museum of Art
- Famous Names (1998), Memorial Art Gallery, Rochester, New York
- Target: The Wild West (1999), Autry Museum of the American West, Los Angeles
- Browning of America (Map) (2000), Crocker Art Museum, Sacramento, California
- Echo Map I (2000), Baltimore Museum of Art
- State Names (2000), Smithsonian American Art Museum, Smithsonian Institution, Washington, D.C.
- Tribal Map (2000), Museum of Fine Arts, Boston
- Tribal Map (2000–2001), Walter E. Washington Convention Center, Events DC, Washington, D.C.
- The Rancher (2002), Hood Museum of Art, Hanover, New Hampshire
- War is Heck (2002), Whitney Museum of American Art, New York City
- Song and Dance (2003), Missoula Art Museum, Montana
- What is an American? (2003), Detroit Institute of Arts; Minneapolis Institute of Art; Spencer Museum of Art, Lawrence, Kansas; and Victoria and Albert Museum, London
- Trade Canoe for Don Quixote (2004), Denver Art Museum
- Who Leads? Who Follows? (2004), Albuquerque Museum, New Mexico
- Trade Canoe: Adrift (2015), National Museum of the American Indian, Smithsonian institution, Washington, D.C.
- Adios Map (2021), National Gallery of Art, Washington, D.C.
