= Native Arts and Cultures Foundation =

Nonprofit arts organization in Oregon, U.S.

- Formation: 2008
- Founded at: Vancouver, Washington
- Legal status: active
- Purpose: grassroots community organization and outreach to listen to and amplify the voices of the Native arts community
- Location: Portland, Oregon
- Services: arts and culture fellowships
- President and CEO: Shyla Spicer (Yakama)
- Website: nativeartsandcultures.org

The Native Arts and Cultures Foundation (NACF) is a 501(c)(3) nonprofit organization that supports Native American artists, culture bearers, and Native-led arts organizations, providing them with support through fellowships and project funding. This philanthropic organization exclusively supports American Indian, Alaska Native, and Native Hawaiian arts and cultures in the United States.

NACF's president and CEO is Shyla Spicer, MBA, PMP (Yakama).

== Founding and history ==
The Native Arts and Cultures Foundation, founded in 2008, is funded by contributions from the public, foundations, corporations, and affiliated organizations. It was launched with a $10 million commitment from the Ford Foundation, following a feasibility study demonstrating the need and interest in such an endowment. The Rumsey Band of Wintun Indians near Sacramento, California, committed an additional $1.5 million.

Walter Echo-Hawk (Pawnee) was the founding Chairman of the Board of Directors. Other founding board members were Joy Harjo (Mvskoke) poet and musician; Elizabeth Woody (Warm Springs/Wasco/Navajo), writer and cultural specialist from the Warm Springs Reservation; Marshall McKay (Yocha Dehe Wintun, 1952–2021), chairman of the Rumsey Rancheria; Letitia Chambers, a private consultant, and Buffy St. Marie, the singer/activist.

NACF was formerly headquartered inn Vancouver, Washington. Lulani Arquette (Native Hawaiian) served as the founding president until December 2023.

== Infrastructure ==
In 2020, the NACF was given Yale Union building in Portland, Oregon, as part of the #LandBack movement. The organizations hosts free monthly community tours through the space and holds changing art exhibitions there.

== Artist Fellowships ==
The NACF awards several Fellowships for Native American artists working in a range of visual, performing, and literary arts. These include the National Artist Fellowship, Regional Arts Fellowships, and the Mentor Artist Fellowship. As of 2019, the Foundation has supported over 300 individual artists and arts organizations spanning 32 states.

=== Mentor Artist Fellows ===
2018

- Aurolyn Renee Stwyer
- Bryan Akipa
- Jason Garcia
- Kathleen Carlo Kendall
- Lily Hope
- Lisa Telford
- Patrick William Kruse
- Will Wilson

2017

- Cara Romero
- Delbert “Smutcoom” Miller
- Delina White
- Dyani White Hawk
- Jackson Polys
- Lani Hotch
- Laura Wong-Whitebear
- Nicholas Galanin
- Royce Manuel
- Shirod Younker
- TahNibaa Naataanii
- Wayne “Minogiizhig” Valliere

==== National Artist Fellows ====
2018

- Allison Akootchook Warden
- Anthony Hudson / Carla Rossi
- Bently Spang
- Brian Adams
- Cary Morin
- Ciara Leina`ala Lacy
- Courtney M. Leonard
- Elizabeth Woody
- Frank Waln
- Heid E. Erdrich
- Jeff Peterson
- Jim Denomie
- Kalani Pe’a
- Linda Infante Lyons
- Luci Tapahonso
- Marques Hanalei Marzan
- Melissa S. Cody
- Michael Wasson
- Pōhaku Kaho`ohanohano
- RYAN! Feddersen

2016

- Aaron J. Sala
- Brenda Mallory
- Bunky Echo-Hawk
- Cannupa Hanska Luger
- Erica Tremblay
- Kelli Jo Ford
- Laura Ortman
- Luzene Hill
- Mark Keali`i Ho`omalu
- Mateo Romero
- Preston Singletary
- Susan Power
- Thea Hopkins
- Theresa Secord
- Tiokasin Ghosthorse
- TJ Young

2015

- Anna Tsouhlarakis
- Clarissa Rizal
- David A. Boxley
- Frank Big Bear
- James Luna
- Kelly Church
- Laura Da’
- Layli Long Soldier
- Lehua Kalima
- Linda Hogan
- Martha Redbone
- Starr Kalāhiki
- Stephen Qacung Blanchett

==== Upper Midwest Artist Fellowships ====
2015

- Amelia Cornelius
- April Stone
- Bennett Brien
- Dyani White Hawk
- Jim Denomie
- Maggie Thompson
- Pat Kruse

2014

- Delina White
- Jennifer M. Stevens
- Kevin Pourier
- Star Wallowing Bull

== Additional projects ==
In 2013, through the Bridge Initiative: Art + Health, NACF funded four programs supporting health and vitality of Native communities in California.

In January 2023, NACF published a literary anthology, The Larger Voice: Celebrating the Work of Native Arts and Cultures Foundation Literature Fellows. Rena Priest (Lummi Nation), Washington State Poet Laureate edited the book, and NACF board member and U.S. Poet Laureate Joy Harjo (Mvskoke) contributed a forward.
