= Star WallowingBull =

Native American artist and illustrator from Minnesota

- Born: August 18, 1973 (age 52); Minneapolis, Minnesota
- Citizenship: White Earth Band of the Minnesota Chippewa Tribe, United States
- Notable work: Black Elk's Little Sand Man; Detritus of the Light People; American Dreamers
- Father: Frank Big Bear
- Awards: NACF Regional Artist (2014)

Star WallowingBull (born 1973) is a Native American visual artist known for his signature Prismacolor drawing. He is a citizen of White Earth Band of the Minnesota Chippewa Tribe and of Arapaho descent. His geometric figurative work evoke machinery and draw from Pop culture.

== Biography ==
=== Early life ===
Star WallowingBull was born August 18, 1973, in Minneapolis, Minnesota. Influenced heavily by his father Frank Big Bear (White Earth Ojibwe), a prominent artist, WallowingBull started drawing at 8 months old and continued to be influenced by Native American art, Pop Art, and European Art Masters in his home of Minneapolis. But as he grew up, he struggled with personal conflicts in his life causing him to drop out of high school and leading him into a path of alcoholism. He eventually used art and these influences to develop a contemporary autobiographical style portraying the struggles of Native American life in a time where Native American people, were still adjusting into a new way of life and law in the United States.

== Art career ==
Frank Big Bear being a prominent artist himself connected his son to art dealer Todd Bockley, who jump-started WallowingBulls' career by showcasing it at the Weisman Art Museum in Minneapolis. Many art collectors were drawn in by his signature art form use of Prismacolor colored pencils, which provided a metallic tone to his collage-like drawings. The Native Arts and Cultures Foundation describes his work as "[employing] colored pencil on paper and acrylic on canvas to explore intersections of American Indian and U.S. pop culture in the 21st Century." An example of one of his earlier art pieces would be Black Elk’s Little Sand Man, a piece that represented a contrast showing symbols of different Indigenous Native American cultures against symbols of what the masses in the U.S. perceive to be Indigenous culture. His work is a representation of the conflicting layers of identity held by generations of Native American people, as they have faced prejudice and unwarranted conflict through colonial influences.

A significant influence came later into Star Wallowing Bulls' life in 2005 when he met his mentor-to-be James Rosenquist in Fargo, North Dakota. While suffering from hand pain, Rosenquist taught Wallowing Bull the art of painting and gave him a $1000 and a full set of tools to start painting. Rosenquist would teach Wallowing Bull the art form he would carry on throughout most of his work after the use of colored pencils caused health issues in his hands.

=== Teaching ===
Currently, Star Wallowing Bull actively goes around to schools of different levels teaching art near his home of Minneapolis as well as throughout parts of North Dakota and the Midwest.

== Artwork ==
=== Plains Art Museum mural ===
This mural, commissioned by the Plains Art Museum in Fargo, North Dakota, was a piece done in 2003 by Wallowing Bull along with his father Frank Big Bear. Contrary to a lot of other work by Wallowing Bull, this piece had a lot heavier influence from Native art styles and motifs. This piece still uses very bright colors, portraying native birds flying around heads of gods surrounded by abstract patterns. A quote in the top right corner states: "I will not be there. I will not fall. Bury my heart at Wounded Knee," referring to the Wounded Knee massacre and paying homage to the struggles faced by Indigenous people of past generations.

=== American Dreamers ===
This piece of prismacolor art is full of bright colours and portrays a Native American chief in the front with another Native holding a gun. Other Native elements such as deer appear, but are all contrasted by a hundred dollar bill in the background and faces prominent in American society such as Martin Luther King and John F. Kennedy. This piece, published in 2000, reflects into how Wallowing Bull felt growing up influence by two societies he had to conform to. This piece, evident in the name itself, symbolizes that the American Dreamers in the background of the picture resemble the same spirit the Native American people have in an effort to search for their identity.

=== Clown Face ===
One of his more environmentally geared pieces of art, this piece was released in 2010 and printed in 2015 for the New Art 2.0 print for Eiteljorg Museum. This piece has abstract colors and elements and features a man drawn in abstract native pattern. We also see rain, drawn in a similarly abstract manner, falling from the sky and hitting the man in the arm causing his arm to burn. This is an environmental pursuit and commentary on smog and acid rain affecting people as well as crops, and done in a way where inverse tones are used to create a powerful image.

== Exhibitions ==
=== Solo exhibitions ===
Dates	Exhibition	Location
January 24, 2015 - July 31, 2015	Star Wallowing Bull: Transformer Star Wallowing Bull: Mechanistic Renderings	Plains Art Museum, Fargo, ND Museum of Contemporary of Native Arts, Santa Fe, NM
October 23. 2013 - November 30, 2013	Star Wallowing Bull: Mechanistic Renderings	Bockley Gallery, Minneapolis, MN
November 21, 2009 - January 2, 2010	Star Wallowing Bull: Wind-talker	Bockley Gallery, Minneapolis, MN
November 18, 2008 - December 23, 2008	The Art of Star Wallowing Bull	Bockley Gallery, Minneapolis, MN
October 18, 2006 - November 15, 2006	Star Wallowing Bull: Beyond Tradition	Bockley Gallery, Minneapolis, MN
September 22, 2005 - January 8, 2006	Between Two Cultures: The Art of Star Wallowing Bull	Plains Art Museum, Fargo, ND
2001	Star Wallowing Bull: Ubiquitous Visions	Plains Art Museum, Fargo, ND

=== Select group exhibitions ===
Dates	Exhibition	Location	People Involved
January 31, 2014 - May 18, 2014	Contemporary American Indian Art	Nerman Museum of Contemporary Art, Overland Park KS	Various Artists
2013-14	Before and after the Horizon: Anishinaabe Artists of the Great Lakes	Smithsonian National Museum of the American Indian, George Gustav Heye Center (August 3 - June 15, 2014) Art Gallery of Ontario, Toronto (July 26, 2014 - December 7, 2014)	curated by David Penney and Gerald McMaster
September 25, 2011 - August 10, 2011	Vantage Point: The Contemporary Native Art Collection	Smithsonian National Museum of the American Indian, Washington, DC	Various Artists
September 13, 2007 - October 27, 2007	Oshki-bawaajige - New Dreaming	October Gallery, London, England	Frank Big Bear, Andrea Carlson, and Star WallowingBull
September 28, 2004 - December 5, 2004	Waasa Inaabidaa - We Look in All Directions	Carl Gorman Museum, University of California, Davis	curated by The Minneapolis Foundation Minneapolis 2003 Paper Warriors: the Drawings of Frank Big Bear and Star Wallowing Bull
2004	Detritus of the Light People	Plains Art Museum, Fargo, ND	Frank Big Bear
2000	Contemporary Native Art in Minnesota	Weisman Art Museum, Minneapolis 1999 Open House, Bockley Gallery, Minneapolis	Julie Buffalohead and Jim Denomie, curated by Kathie Bennewitz and Jill Boldenow; shown in conjunction with Listening with the Heart: the Work of Frank Big Bear, George Morrison, and Norval Morrisseau, curated by Todd Bockley

== Collections ==
- British Museum
- National Museum of the American Indian
- Plains Art Museum
- Weisman Art Museum
- Tweed Museum of Art
- Nerman Museum of Contemporary Art

== Honors and awards ==
- Native Arts and Cultures Foundation Regional Artist Fellowship
  - Fellowship studying history of Araphoe tribe and maintaining their cultural traditions through art
- Bush Foundation - Bush Artist Fellowship
- Plains Art Museum, Art on the Plains 6 - Juror Award
- Smithsonian National Museum of the American Indian - Native Artist Fellowship
