= All My Relations Arts =

Arts organization in Minnesota, United States

- Mitakuye Oyasin
- Formation: 1999
- Founder: Shirlee Stone
- Location(s): 1414 E Franklin Ave; Minneapolis, MN 55404
- Coordinates: 44.9628°N 93.2545°W
- Parent organization: American Indian Neighborhood Development Corporation/Great Neighborhoods! Development Corporation

All My Relations Arts is a Native American arts organization in Minneapolis, Minnesota. It is a project of the Native American Community Development Institute (NACDI).

== History ==
The organization was founded in 1999 by Shirlee Stone. It was initially a project of the American Indian Business Development Corporation and hosted over 23 exhibitions at Ancient Traders Gallery until 2009. All My Relations has also been exhibited at The Edge Center in Bigfork, Minnesota, Cornucopia Gallery in Lanesboro, Minnesota, and Mill City Museum in Minneapolis.

Following the closure of Ancient Traders Gallery, All My Relations relocated to a space at 1414 East Franklin Avenue. Artists who have exhibited with the arts organization include Mona Smith, Jim Denomie, Andrea Carlson, Carl Gawboy, Gordon Coons, and Sam English. Its inaugural exhibition was a display of work by Anishinabe artist Frank Big Bear.

In February 2010, All My Relations officially became an initiative of the Native American Community Development Institute (NACDI).

From 2010 to 2015, Dyani White Hawk was the chief director and curator of the gallery. On May 20, 2019 curator and public artist Angela Two Stars became the new Director of All My Relations Arts.

== Artist-in-Residence ==
In 2017, All My Relations launched their First Annual Indigenous Artist-in-Residence program. The first resident was Tanya Lukin Linklater, who produced the solo exhibition The Harvest Sturdies that ran from Feb 26 - March 5 2017. It was created in response to Chief Theresa Spence's 44-day hunger strike in 2012-13.
