= John Coy =

American writer (born 1958)

John Richard Coy
- Publicity photo of John Richard Coy.
- Born: John Richard Coy; August 9, 1958 (age 68); Minneapolis, Minnesota, United States
- Occupations: Children's and young adult author
- Writing career
- Period: 1958–present
- Genres: Realistic fiction, nonfiction, and picture books
- Website: www.johncoy.com

John Richard Coy (born August 9, 1958) is an American children's and young adult author. He writes picture books, young adult novels and the 4 for 4 middle-grade series. He is best known for his books on basketball, Strong to the Hoop, Around the World, and Hoop Genius as well as Night Driving, Their Great Gift, and his coming-of-age novel, Crackback. He lives in Minneapolis, Minnesota and visits schools around the world.

== Biography ==
=== Early life ===
Born in Minneapolis, Minnesota, John Richard Coy was the oldest of four children. His parents were both educators: Coy's father taught college history and his mother taught high school English. Graduating from Saint John's University in Collegeville, Minnesota, he later received his Master of Arts degree in children and creativity from St. Mary's University in Minneapolis, Minnesota. Coy worked at a variety of jobs—dishwasher, tour guide, mattress maker—before deciding on a career as a writer.

=== Career ===
His first picture book, Night Driving, was inspired by cross-country driving trips on which his father took his family of six when the author was young. John, the oldest, usually sat in front with his father, talking during the wee hours of the night, learning more about his dad than he did when the family was at home.

John's book Strong to the Hoop involved him in the National Basketball Association's Read to Achieve program. Strong to the Hoop was translated into Spanish as Directo al Aro four years later. The publisher asked that John write a book about basketball as it is played in countries all over the world. That book became Around the World.

Working with boys during school visits, talking to them, hearing the reasons they do and do not read, John has written books he would have liked reading as a teen. Crackback is set within the realities of high school football and Box Out perceptively follows a sophomore as he is called up to play varsity basketball. His third young adult novel Gap Life is about Cray Franklin, a boy whose parents will pay for college, but only if he studies what they want, which is not what he wants.

John's popular 4 for 4 series offers readers four novels about four friends engaged in sports, making the transition from elementary school to middle school. Middle grade readers will enjoy: Top of the Order, which is all about baseball; Eyes on the Goal, which tells an exciting soccer story; Love of the Game, in which the four friends hope to make the football team; Take Your Best Shot, a hoops story that concludes the series.

Strong to the Hoop, Night Driving, and Vroomaloom Zoom have been produced as children's theater throughout the United States.

John has worked as a librettist with the Minnesota Orchestra, an editor for the Youth Computer Center at the Science Museum of Minnesota, and a tour guide for the Minnesota Historical Society. He has also worked extensively with developmentally disabled adults and children.

== Works ==
=== Published works ===
- Night Driving (1996), illustrated by Peter McCarty, picture book
- Strong to the Hoop (1999), illustrated by Leslie Jean-Bart, picture book
- Vroomaloom Zoom (2000), illustrated by Joe Cepeda, picture book
- Directo al Aro (2002), ilustrado por Leslie Jean-Bart, traducido por Enrique del Risco, picture book
- Two Old Potatoes and Me (2003), illustrated by Carolyn Fisher, picture book
- Around the World (2005), illustrated by Antonio Reonegro and Tom Lynch, book
- Crackback (2005), novel
- Box Out (2009), novel
- Top of the Order (2009), novel, Book 1 of the 4 for 4 series
- Eyes on the Goal (2010), novel, Book 2 of the 4 for 4 series
- Love of the Game (2011), novel, Book 3 of the 4 for 4 series
- Take Your Best Shot (2012), novel, Book 4 of the 4 for 4 series
- For Extreme Sports-Crazy Boys Only (2015)
- Game Changer: John McLendon and the Secret Game (2016), picture book, illustrated by Randy DuBurke
- Their Great Gift: Courage, Sacrifice, and Hope in a New Land (2016), photographs by Wing Young Huie
- Gap Life (2016), novel
- Where We Come From (2022) with Shannon Gibney , Sun Yung Shin, Diane Wilson, illustrated by Dion MBD

== Awards and honors ==
=== Night Driving ===
- 1997 Marion Vannett Ridgway Memorial Award for author's first book, Night Driving
- 1996 Choice Books, Cooperative Children's Book Center
- 1998 Best Children's Books of the Year, Bank Street College of Education

=== Strong to the Hoop ===
- 2000 American Library Association Notable Book
- 2000 Best Children's Books of the Year, Bank Street College of Education
- 2000 Notable Books for a Global Society, International Reading Association

=== Vroomaloom Zoom ===
- 2001 Children's Literature Choices list
- 2001 Best Children's Books of the Year, Bank Street College of Education

=== Two Old Potatoes and Me ===
- 2003 Best Family Books for the Year, Nickelodeon
- 2003 Best Children's Books of the Year, Bank Street College of Education
- 2003 Reading Rainbow book
- 2004 Charlotte Zolotow Honor book

=== Around the World ===
- 2005 Junior Library Guild

=== Hoop Genius: How a Desperate Teacher and a Rowdy Gym Class Invented Basketball ===
- 2013 Best Books for Kids and Teens, Canadian Children's Book Centre
- 2013 Top Ten Sports Books for Youth, Booklist
- 2014 Choice Books, Cooperative Children's Book Center
- 2014 Best Children's Books of the Year, Bank Street College of Education
- 2015 Multicultural Book Collection, Reading is Fundamental
- 2015 National Endowment for the Humanities Nonfiction Favorites List for Young Readers

=== Game Changer: John McLendon and the Secret Game ===
- 2016 Orbis Pictus Recommended Book for Outstanding Nonfiction for Children, National Council of Teachers of English
- 2016 Notable Books for a Global Society, International Reading Association
- Best Children's Books of the Year, with Outstanding Merit, Bank Street College of Education
- 2016 Elizabeth Burr/Worzalla Award for Distinguished Achievement in Children's Literature, Wisconsin Library Association Youth Services Section

=== Top of the Order ===
- 2010 Junior Library Guild
- 2010 Choice Books, Cooperative Children's Book Center
- 2010 Best Children's Books of the Year, Bank Street College of Education

=== Eyes on the Goal ===
- 2011 Choice Books, Cooperative Children's Book Center

=== Take Your Best Shot ===
- 2013 Choice Books, Cooperative Children's Book Center

=== Crackback ===
- 2005 Junior Library Guild
- 2005 500 Great Books for Teens, Additional Title of Interest, by Anita Silvey
- 2006 Quick Picks for Reluctant Readers, YALSA
- 2007 Young Adults’ Choices, International Reading Association

=== Box Out ===
- 2009 Junior Library Guild
- 2009 Top Ten Sports Books for Youth, Booklist

=== Where We Come From ===
- 2023 Carter G. Woodson Book Award
