= Jim Denomie =

Native American painter (1955–2022)

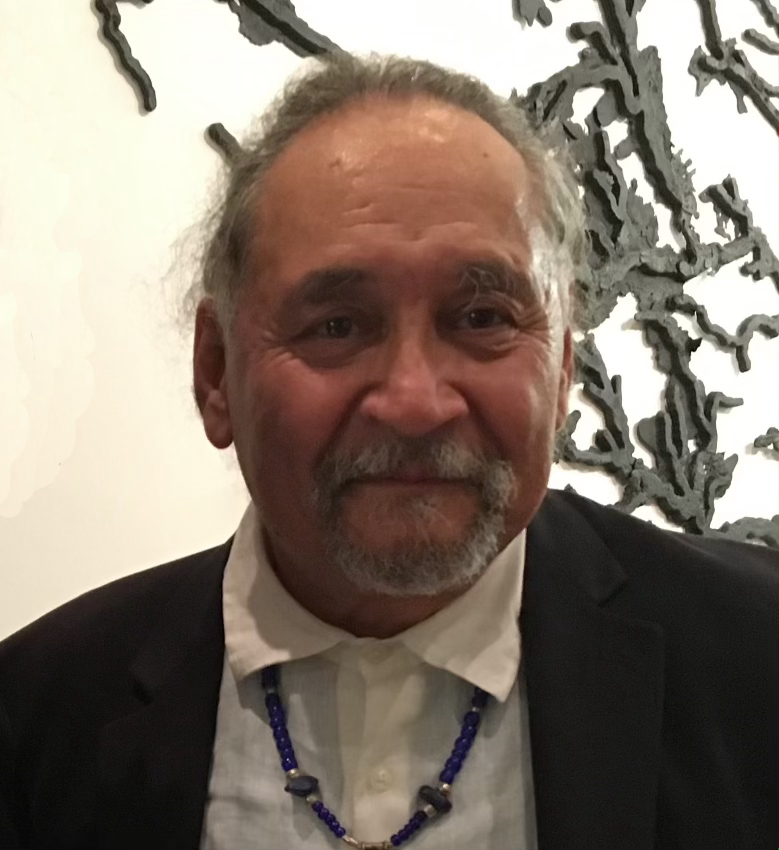
- Born: 1955; Hayward, Wisconsin, U.S.
- Died: March 1, 2022 (aged 67); Shafer, Minnesota, U.S.
- Education: BFA University of Minnesota
- Known for: Painting
- Movement: Metaphorical surrealism, history painting
- Spouse: Diane Wilson
- Awards: Minneapolis City Pages Artist of the Year award (2007), Bush Artist Fellowship (2008), and Eiteljorg Native American Fine Art Fellowship (2009)
- Website: Official website

Jim Denomie (1955 – March 1, 2022) was an Ojibwe Native American painter, known for his colorful, at times comical, looks at United States history and Indigenous peoples of the Americas.

== Biography ==
=== Early life ===
A citizen of the Lac Courte Oreilles Band of Lake Superior Chippewa Indians, Denomie lived on the Lac Courte reservation until the age of four. Then, his family moved to Chicago, Illinois, as part of the U.S. federal government's Native relocation program in the 1960s. This program, started by Dillon S. Myer, head of Bureau of Indian Affairs, hoped to assimilate American Indians into mainstream society by providing job and housing opportunities in major cities for selected families and individuals.

The stress of the relocation contributed to Denomie's parents' divorce. At age five, he went to live with his mother in Minneapolis. During summers and winters, he visited his grandparents on the reservation.

As a youth, Denomie struggled in school and its pressures to conform. While he sought family support in dealing with racism, stereotypes, and peer pressure, they rarely helped, as many of his relatives and friends dealt with their own conflicts regarding assimilation. Denomie began abusing alcohol as a teenager, but stopped drinking in 1990.

=== College ===
Denomie pursued a degree in health science at the University of Minnesota. There he joined the college's American Indian student organization, met fellow Native students, and engaged with Native American art, cultures, politics, languages, and other subjects he had not been exposed to in his primary education. Denomie also became a teaching assistant in the American Indian studies department. After switching majors, he received his Bachelor of Fine Arts degree in 1995. His art classes exposed him to Western art history, and he began to form his own style and techniques.

=== Personal life ===
A husband, father, and grandfather, Denomie lived and worked in Shafer, Minnesota. He was an avid golfer.

=== Death and legacy ===
Denomie died of cancer at his home on March 1, 2022, at the age of 67.

== Art career ==
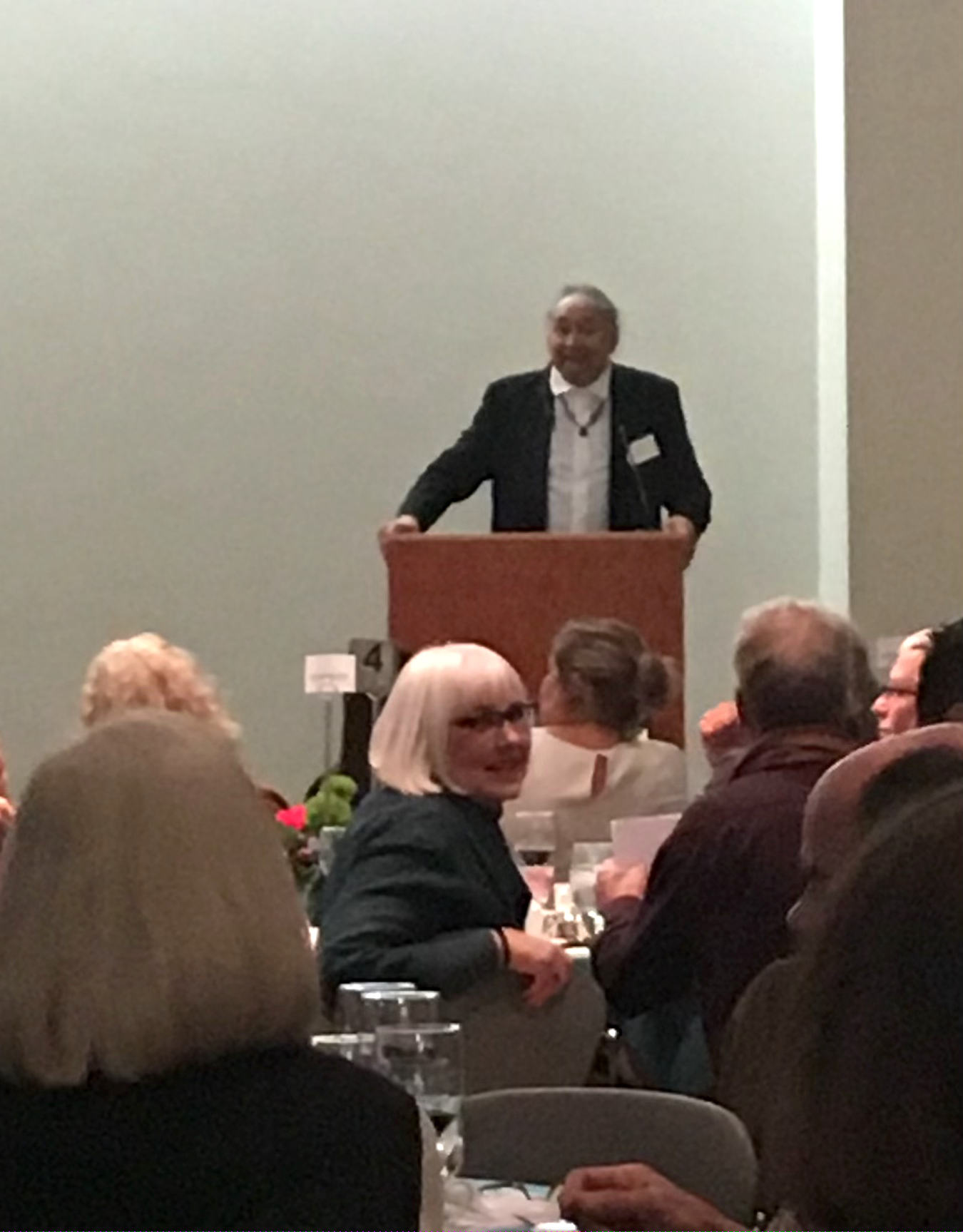
Accepting the 2019 McKnight Distinguished Artist Award

In addition to painting, Denomie also worked in photography, collage, and mixed media. Bockley Gallery represented him.

He holds his mirror up to Indigenous people as surely as he does to Americans and American culture. Denomie's art addresses everyone with equal rigor and has important lessons for all viewers. - Gail Tremblay

=== Creation process ===
Starting with a theme, he then started an initial sketch which served as a rough draft, refining it until it was ready to be executed into a painting. With paintings ripe with color and heavy texture, he at times mixed his paints directly on the canvas when working quickly. His large scale works always receive a ground layer of paint which assists in forming a general composition. He described his process as a "chess game", derived from the many decisions he must make when placing, layering and constructing his detailed works.

When asked when he decided a painting was completed, Denomie stated:

...a painting is done when the artist dies. Previously, I felt that a painting was done when I have taken it as far as I could, at that point in time, and signed it. Now, if the painting is still in my possession and I am not impressed with it, I may rework it. A painting is like a motion picture, always evolving. We hit pause when it looks good to us and then we sign it. But we may come back to it sometime later and look at it again with a perspective enhanced by experience and development and say, “this painting needs more work.”

His preferred creation time was in the evening, listening to music by the likes of Bob Dylan, Creedence Clearwater Revival, Dire Straits, among others. Denomie credited his primary instructors at the University of Minnesota as major influences on his painting, as well as his family, dreams, memories, and his own life experiences.

=== Metaphorical surrealism ===
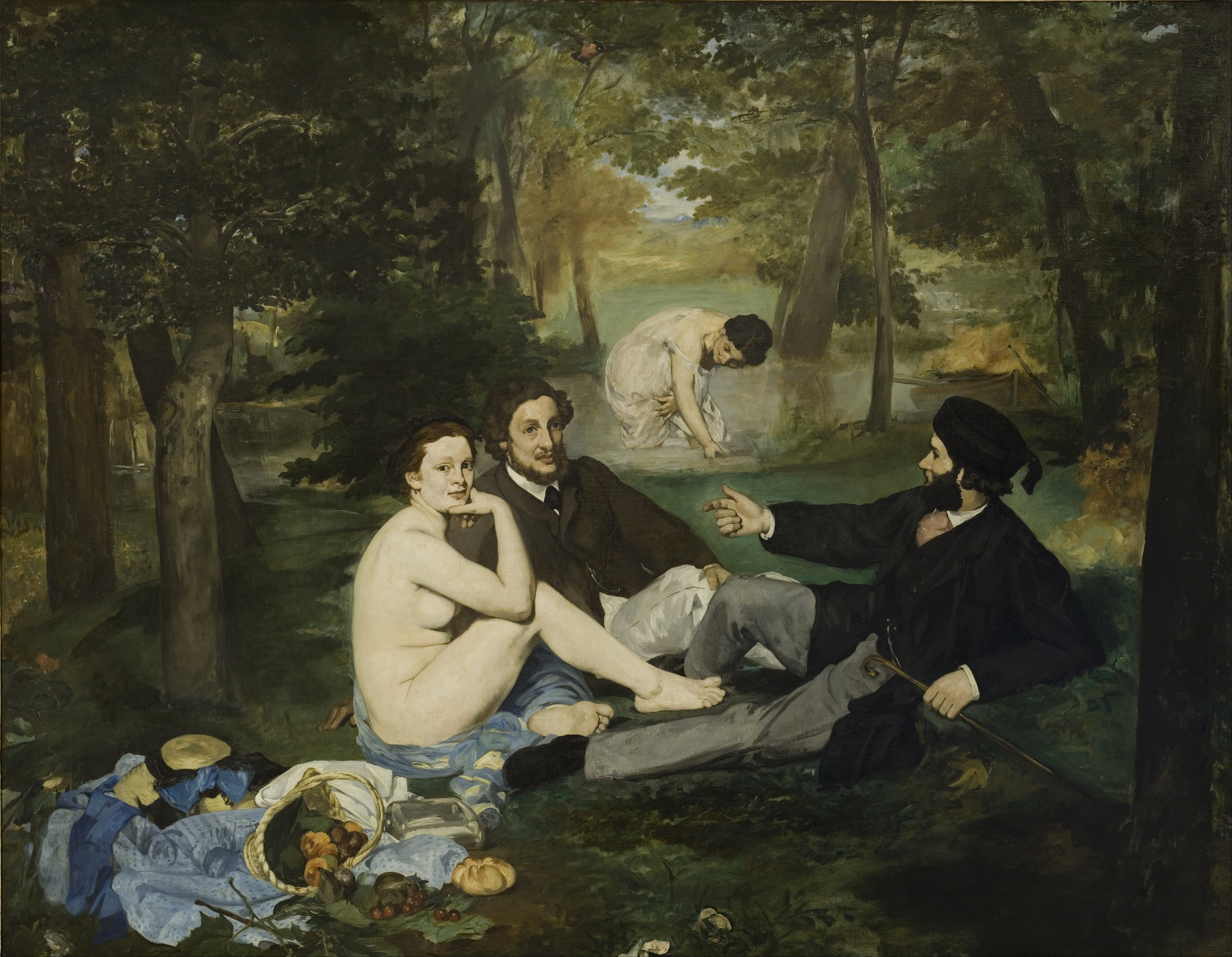
Manet's Le déjeuner sur l'herbe, which served as the scene for Edward Curtis, Paparazzi: Skinny Dip

Denomie described his narrative painting style as "metaphorical surrealism". His paintings frequently examine historical and contemporary events in American and Native American history, as well as aspects of pop-culture, art history and Anglo-Indian relations.

Works such as Attack on Fort Snelling Bar and Grill (2007) are a comical examination of 19th century American events and contemporary culture. Inspired by his wife's participation in the 1862 Commemorative March, which took place in March 2006 to honor Dakota women and children forced to walk 150 miles from the Lower Sioux Agency to Fort Snelling due to the refusal by Indian agent Thomas J. Galbraith to release foodstuffs to the community. Andrew Myrick, a storekeeper from the agency, stated that if the Indians were hungry "let them eat grass or their own dung." Myrick was killed on the second day at the Battle of Lower Sioux Agency and when his body was found he had a mouth stuffed full of grass. Many of these events are shown in the painting: Myrick running away from an Indian on a lawnmower with grass in his mouth, Edward Hopper's Nighthawks inspires the Bar & Grill, a World Wrestling Entertainment flag flies high as a tribute to Minnesota governor Jesse Ventura, Edward S. Curtis photographs an Indian couple in their own version of American Gothic, a nude Indian woman riding an appaloosa, and other numerous events and individuals representing Indian Country yesterday and today.

Edward Curtis, Paparazzi: Chicken Hawks (2008) at the National Gallery of Art in 2023

Edward S. Curtis makes a number of appearances as a voyeur in Denomie's artworks. In Edward Curtis, Paparazzi: Skinny Dip Denomie mocks Édouard Manet's Le déjeuner sur l'herbe. A group of four Indians, one in a lake, while the others reclining in a grassy area, relax after a day of skinny dipping and Edward Curtis is shown in the corner, with his camera, prepared to take pictures.

Peking Duck (2008) parodies the Bering Strait theory by showing an Indian riding in a rickshaw carrying Chinese takeout in his hand. Above the taxi is a Denomie's own version of The Creation of Adam, depicting White Buffalo Calf Woman giving a drum to the Lakota people.

=== Portraits ===
In 2005 Denomie decided to create a portrait a day for one year as a way to make painting more of a priority in his life. His busy life wasn't allowing him to work in the studio as often as he liked, and upon returning to the studio after a week of not working he felt like a foreigner. This has led to a collection of hundreds of portraits, primarily small scale works (5x7 inches, 6x8 inches) of American Indians that Denomie described as "Rugged Indians". The portraits are generally head and shoulder portraits, with the individual facing forward, taking between 15 and 30 minutes to complete. The concept, similar to Chris Ofili's Afro Muses series, allowed Denomie to get his "head into the oven" of art creation. Succeeding at this project, Denomie was no longer painting a portrait a day.

The Afflicted Warriors is a series of portraits depicting male Indian warriors with long hair, a headband a single feather from their head, while some are not adorned. The Wounded Knee series is reminiscent of Picasso's Blue Period, a series of male and female portraits painted in blues, greens and blacks with a touch of white. The portraits are skeletal, representative of the horrors that took place at Wounded Knee. Occasionally they are just general "Rugged Indians" and Denomie signed, dated and perhaps named the portrait after someone it reminded him of.

=== Wabooz ===
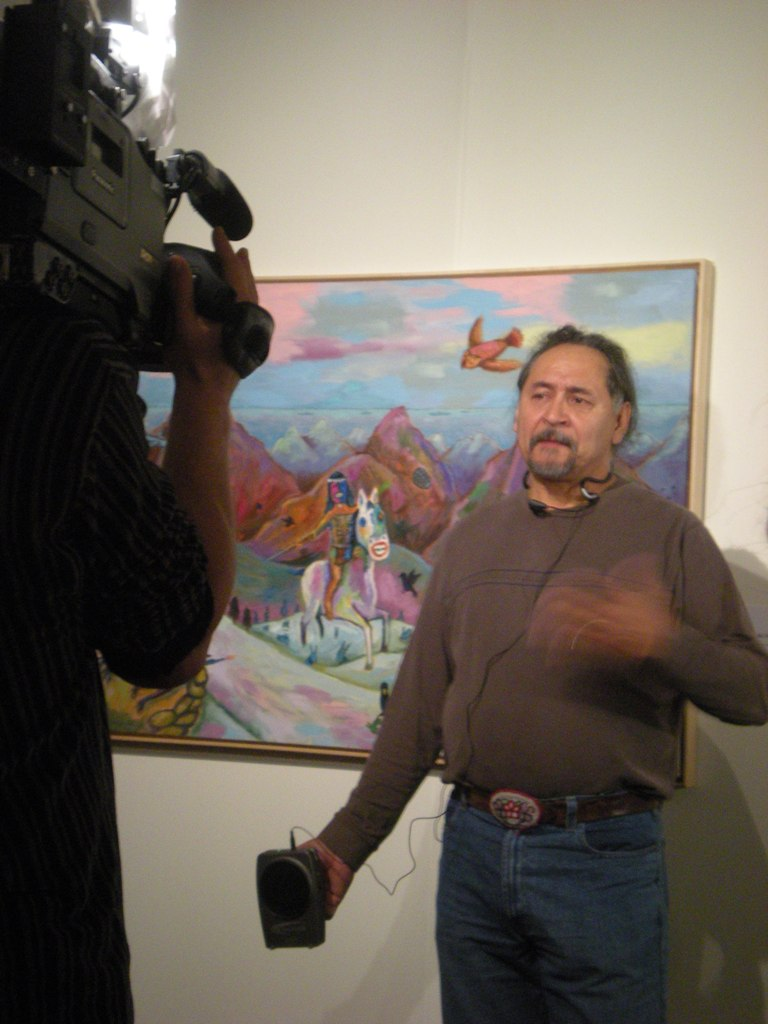
Speaking at the Eiteljorg Museum in front of his painting A Beautiful Hero, Woody Keeble (2009)

Denomie's studio, Wabooz Studio, is named for the Ojibwe word for "rabbit." Wabooz is a common image in Denomie's paintings, as an animal that he identified with, the rabbit is also representative of the Ojibwe trickster figure Nanaboujou. As an alter ego for Denomie, he allowed himself to enter the works of art he created. Wabooz has even made an appearance in Denomie's portraits as Magic Rabbit, a series of three paintings depicting an alert rabbit wearing a vest with intense almost google-eyes.

=== Minnesota ===
Minnesotan politics, news and Indian Country are often found in Denomie's contemporary history paintings. The intense recount between Al Franken and Norm Coleman is shown in Split Decision, where Paul Wellstone is the referee standing between the two politicians, dressed like boxers. Denomie's signature cast of characters sit in the audience: Wabooz, an Indian riding a horse, a coyote, a moose, and plenty of unenthusiastic people.

The landscape Casino Sunrise is Denomie's own remake of the Seal of Minnesota. Governor Tim Pawlenty is represented by "Pawl Bunyan" (a play on Paul Bunyan) and is shown with his pants around his ankles standing directly behind Babe the Blue Ox. Former governor Jessie Ventura is shown only wearing a thong and a feather boa; he has a cigar in his mouth, a fishing rod set with a grenade in one hand, and a fist of money in the other. No politician of recent Minnesota history escapes the wrath of Denomie's paintbrush; Norm Coleman sits on a toilet and Al Franken counts ballots behind him. Indian Country is represented as well through images of lynched Indians from Fort Snelling, an Indian funeral pyre, a Christian church, a member of the American Indian Movement riding a horse and more. A Minneapolis police car relating to arrests made of three Indian men and without enough room for them all in the car, one was placed in the trunk, is also depicted. Of this painting Denomie said, "The Minnesota State seal needed to be updated. It's been a while...This is all history, all of it is history of Minnesota."

== Major exhibitions ==
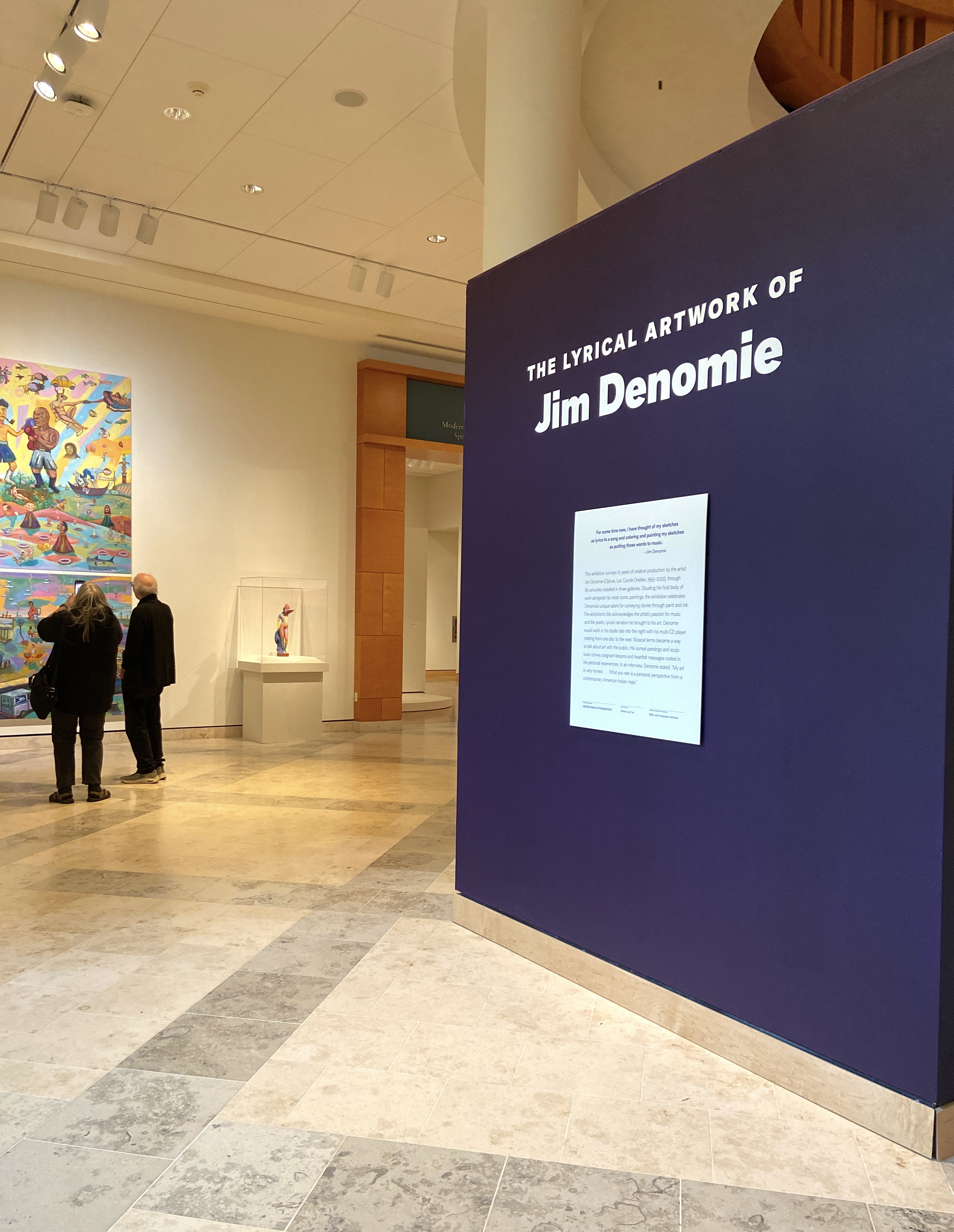
Exhibition, The Lyrical Artwork of Jim Denomie

- "The Lyrical Artwork of Jim Denomie" July 8, 2023 - March 24, 2024, Minneapolis Institute of Art, Minneapolis, MN
- "Silver River" 2016 Wiesman Art Museum, Minneapolis, MN
- "Jim Denomie, Paintings" 2015 Projek Traum, Atelier Glidden Wozniak, Friedrichschaffen, Germany
- "Jim Denomie, Dialogues" 2014 Bockley Gallery, Minneapolis, MN
- "It's New, It's Now" 2013 Minneapolis Institute of Art, Minneapolis, MN
- "The Crow's Shadow Institute of the Arts Biennial" 2012, Hallie Ford Museum of Art, Willamette Universary, Salem, OR
- "Counting Coup" Museum of Contemporary Native Art, Santa Fe, NM
- Now and Then, 2010, Winona State University, Winona, MN
- Transcending Traditions: Contemporary American Indian Artwork, 2010, Mesa Arts Center, Mesa, AZ
- Art Quantum, 2009, Eiteljorg Museum of American Indians and Western Art, Indianapolis, IN
- Jim Denomie: Recent History, 2009, Bockley Gallery, Minneapolis, MN
- Common Ground: Paintings by Julie Buffalohead and Jim Denomie, 2008, Metro State University, St. Paul, MN
- Jim Denomie: Recent Works, 2008, Finlandia University, Hancock, MI
- New Skins: New Paintings by Andrea Carlson and Jim Denomie, 2007, Minneapolis Institute of Arts, Minneapolis, MN
- Reflections of Lewis & Clark, 2005, University of Montana, Missoula, MT
- Painting by Jim Denomie, 2004, Plains Art Museum, Fargo, ND
- 8th Native American Fine Arts Invitational, 2002, Heard Museum, Phoenix, AZ
- Truth, 2002, St. John's University, Collegeville, MN
- Transitions, 2000, Duluth Art Institute, Duluth, MD
- Metaphor and Intuition, 1999, Iowa State University, Ames, IA

== Notable awards ==
- McKnight Distinguished Artist Award, 2019
- Eiteljorg Fellowship for Native American Fine Arts, 2009
- Bush Artist Fellowship, 2008
