= Diane Wilson (author) =

Dakota author from Minnesota

- Born: 1954 (age 71–72)
- Citizenship: Rosebud Sioux Tribe and United States
- Occupation: Author
- Spouse: Jim Denomie (1955–2022)
- Writing career
- Years active: 2006–present
- Genres: fiction, nonfiction, memoir
- Subjects: Dakota people, Indigenous food sovereignty
- Notable awards: Minnesota Book Award (2006, 2022)
- Website: dianewilsonwords.com

Diane Wilson is a Native American (Rosebud Sioux/Mdewakanton) writer known for her 2006 novel Spirit Car: Journey to a Dakota Past and her 2021 novel The Seed Keeper. Both books won Minnesota Book Awards.

== Early life ==
Diana Wilson was born in 1954. She is a citizen of the Rosebud Sioux Tribe and a Mdewakanton descendent. Her great-great-grandmother was Dakota woman Rosalie Marpiya Mase who married French-Canadian fur trader Louis LaCroix. Wilson's mother spent time at a South Dakota boarding school. She is also of Swedish-American heritage.

She grew up in Golden Valley.

== Writing career ==
Wilson's first book was Spirit Car: Journey to a Dakota Past, published in 2006. It won the Minnesota Book Award, and was selected for the 2012 One Minneapolis One Read program.

Her second book, Beloved Child: A Dakota Way of Life was recognized by the Minnesota State Arts Board and the Ragdale Artist Residency. It also won the 2012 Barbara Sudler Award from History Colorado.

Her third book, The Seed Keeper, was published in 2021 and weaved the story of four native women between 1862 and 2002. Her experience participating in the Dakota Commemorative March, which is a 50-mile journey honoring the Dakota people forcibly removed from Minnesota following the U.S.-Dakota War of 1862, and hearing the stories of women sewing seeds into the hems of their skirts on the journey inspired the book. The cover of the book was designed by Dakota artist Holly Young.The Seed Keeper received the 2022 Minnesota Book Award for Fiction and was a 2025-26 NEA Big Read selection.

She has also won a 50 Over 50 Award from Pollen/Midwest.

Wilson has published essays on seed advocacy, food sovereignty, social justice, and cultural recovery in various anthologies and environmental publications.

Her first children's book, Where We Come From, was published in 2022.

== Editing and advocacy ==
Wilson served as an editor for Minnesota Literature. She has received awards from the Bush Foundation, the Jerome Foundation, the East Central Regional Arts Council, and more.

Wilson served as the executive director for the Native American Food Sovereignty Alliance which works to create sovereign food systems for Native people, as well as for the organization Dream of Wild Health. Her experience with Indigenous foods and GMO seeds featured in her third novel.

== Personal life ==
Her husband was Jim Denomie, who was a painter and citizen of the Lac Courte Oreilles Band of Ojibwe.

She now lives in Shafer, Minnesota, on land with a tamarack bog.

== Bibliography ==
- Spirit Car: Journey to a Dakota Past (2006)
- Beloved Child: A Dakota Way of Life (2011)
- Ella Cara Deloria: Dakota Language Protector (2020)
- The Seed Keeper (2021)
- Where We Come From (2022)
