= Robert Allen Nelson =

American artist and educator (1925–2021)

Robert Allen Nelson (August 1, 1925 – December 2, 2021), commonly credited as Robert A. Nelson, was an American artist and educator who worked in drawing, printmaking, painting, collage, ceramics, assemblage, and sculpture. He participated in the Museum of Modern Art's 1962 exhibition Recent Painting U.S.A.: The Figure. His work is held in the collections of institutions including the Smithsonian American Art Museum, National Gallery of Art, North Carolina Museum of Art, Minneapolis Institute of Art, Blanton Museum of Art, and Cleveland Museum of Art.

== Early life and education ==
Nelson was born on August 1, 1925, in Milwaukee, Wisconsin. He studied at the School of the Art Institute of Chicago, where he earned bachelor's and master's degrees in art education in 1950 and 1951, respectively. He later earned a doctorate in education from New York University in 1971.

== Teaching career ==
After completing his degrees, Nelson taught at his alma mater, the School of the Art Institute of Chicago. He began teaching at the University of Manitoba School of Art in 1954 and joined the faculty of the University of North Dakota in 1956. At North Dakota, he taught graduate courses in painting and drawing and undergraduate courses in anatomy, drawing, and printmaking while maintaining his studio practice.

He subsequently taught at Cleveland State University and the University of North Carolina at Chapel Hill. Nelson joined the faculty of Millersville University of Pennsylvania in 1979 and retired in 1997. Millersville subsequently granted him the rank of professor emeritus.

== Artistic career ==
Nelson worked in several media, including painting, drawing, printmaking, collage, ceramics, assemblage, neon sculpture, and textiles. The University of North Dakota described his drawings, prints, and collages as combining technical draftsmanship with surreal and imaginative imagery and identified the Old Masters, including Leonardo da Vinci, as influences on his work.

In 1962, Nelson's work was selected for Recent Painting U.S.A.: The Figure at the Museum of Modern Art in New York. The national exhibition presented 74 works selected from approximately 10,000 submissions and later traveled to museums in several American cities.

Nelson received a Cézanne medal from the French government in 1951 and a purchase prize at the Boston Printmakers' 31st National Exhibition in 1979. In 2008, the Boston Printmakers named him an emeritus member.

Nelson continued making and exhibiting art after retiring from teaching. In 2020, the Rourke Art Gallery + Museum presented an exhibition drawn from its permanent collection of his paintings, drawings, prints, ceramics, assemblages, sculptures, and textiles.

== Museum collections ==
Nelson's works are held by a number of American museums. The National Gallery of Art holds his 1964 lithograph S. Decatur. The North Carolina Museum of Art holds the 1981 lithograph The Pushover, and the Minneapolis Institute of Art holds works including Repair Shop and Candy Crow, both dated 1979.

The Blanton Museum of Art holds Nelson's 1964 painting Icarus, while the Cleveland Museum of Art holds his lithograph-and-collage work Pirate Mouse Thinking from the NOVA Portfolio. The Rourke Art Gallery + Museum holds a group of Nelson's works in multiple media, including painting, drawing, printmaking, ceramics, assemblage, textiles, and neon. The University of Manitoba has also reported that Nelson's work is represented in the collections of the Seattle Art Museum, Walker Art Center, deCordova Sculpture Park and Museum, Brooklyn Museum, Millersville University, the University of Manitoba School of Art Gallery, and the Plains Art Museum.

== Death ==
Nelson died at his home in Lakeside, Oregon, on December 2, 2021, at the age of 96.
