= Wizipan Little Elk =

American politician and activist

- Citizenship: United States of America
- Education: Bachelor's of Arts from Yale University; Juris Doctor in Indian Law from the University of Arizona

Wizipan Little Elk is a community leader of the Rosebud Sioux Tribe who seeks to improve the wellbeing of Native Americans in the United States through governmental and economic policies.

== Political career ==
Wizipan joined then-Senator Barack Obama's presidential campaign in 2008 as a Native American Outreach Coordinator and was promoted to the First Americans Vote director. Once Obama was elected president, Wizipan became part of the transition team, the First Americans Public Liaison. Later, he was named deputy chief of staff to the United States Department of the Interior Assistant Secretary of Indian Affairs.

== Community activism ==
In 2011, Wizipan returned to Rosebud Indian Reservation, and became CEO of the Rosebud Economic Development Corporation (REDCO).

Wizipan is a board member of the Native American Contractors Association.

== Awards ==
In both 2019 and 2020 he was awarded Native American Agriculture Fund (NAAF) grants. In 2021, Wizipan was awarded a Bush Foundation fellowship.
