= Delina White =

American fashion designer

- Education: Bemidji State University
- Children: 2
- Website: www.iamanishinaabe.com

Delina White is a contemporary Native American artist specializing in indigenous, gender-fluid clothing for the LGBTQ and Two-Spirit Native communities. She is also an activist for issues such as environmental crisis, violence against women, and sex trafficking.

White is a member of the Minnesota Chippewa Tribe, Leech Lake Band of Ojibwe.

== Personal life ==
White was born into the Leech Lake Band of Ojibwe, in 1964. She was given the name "Wades in the water", as water is healing and is a symbol for life. She grew up in a two bedroom home without running water or electricity and has stated that many of her favorite memories consist of walking the trails and paths of the “old ones” along with her cousins, as well as partaking in powwows and would dance in them as a young girl. Her mother would create all of her dancing outfits, which included beadwork done by hand. White was taught to create beadwork at the age of six by her grandmother, Maggie King.

White attended Bemidji State University, where she earned a Bachelors of Science in Business Administration with an emphasis in Management, and a minor in Management Information Systems. It took White twenty years to complete the degree and she was the first of her family to attend college.

She has two daughters, Lavender Hunt and Sage Davis, who help run her company and her granddaughter Nookwakwii or Snowy White.

== Art career ==
White launched her clothing collection I Am Anishinaabe, which she runs alongside her daughter Lavender Hunt and granddaughter Snowy, the latter of whom serves as the brand signature and international model. She has designed for fashion shows such as the Haute Couture Fashion Show in Santa Fe and has collaborated with and mentored other clothing designers. In 2017 she and Joy Campaigne presented their work together at a community workshop at the American Indian Community and Housing Organization in Duluth, Minnesota.

She produced her first fashion show at the Great Lakes Woodland Skirts Fashion Show in 2015. For the show White used her clothing and image projections along with her own narration to give insight about the history of traditional Native women's ribbon skirts. She elaborated that ribbon skirts can be worn anytime and that wearing it makes it a symbol of cultural celebration of the legacy of Native peoples. The mediums used by White to create her work were fabric, thread, beading, and other materials.

White has won numerous awards and grants for her work, which has been exhibited in locations such as the Art Institute of Minneapolis. She typically works with modern/contemporary fabrics from around the world materials such as hand-tanned leather, bones, and shells, which she uses to create and design traditional Native works.

In 2021, White had her first show at FWMN in September 2021 called Native Visions.

In 2023, Northern Lights Anishinaabe Fashion Show was back in Minnesota.

=== I Am Anishinaabe ===
In 2015 White launched the "I Am Anishinaabe" collection. Her inspiration for the collection came from the Great Lakes, the Lakota term "winyanktehca", which means balance, individualism, and fluidity of genders or sexuality, and the term two-spirits, which is used by some Indigenous North Americans to describe Native people in their communities who fulfill a traditional third-gender (or other gender-variant) ceremonial role in their cultures. White intended the line to show support for underrepresented LGBTQ+ communities, particularly those in Native American cultures.

She showcased her collection at the Walker Art Center on June 13, 2019, and chose to use people who identified as two-spirit and queer as her models. The collection is made of fifteen contemporary Great Lakes woodland-style skirts, along with items such as pipe bags, handbags, and moccasins. The collection also features a piece created by White's daughter Lavender, a skirt that features an Ojibwe floral design and a high slit intended to allow the individual wearing it to show their leg if they so wish. Of the collection as a whole, White has stated that the clothing is "meant to make the individual wearing them, happy, to feel good, to feel good about who they are, be confident and take pride in being a Two-Spirit."

== Awards and honors ==
Delina White has acquired many awards, fellowships, and grants that includes:

- 2019: Wings Arts Council Master Artist
- 2017: Native Arts & Cultures Foundation Mentor Fellowship
- 2015: Folk and Traditional Arts award from the MN State Arts Board
- 2015: Native Arts & Cultures Foundation Fellowship
- 2015: Arrowhead Regional Arts Council Technology / Equipment award
- 2014: Five Wings Arts Council Community Arts Leadership award
- 2014: Native American Culture Foundation
- 2010: Bush Foundation Fellowship

== Exhibitions and shows ==
- Hearts of Our People: Native Women Artists, traveling exhibition (2019–2020, Minneapolis Institute of Art, Frist Museum, Smithsonian American Art Museum, Philbrook Museum of Art)
- Style show at “A Traditional Perspective in the Modern World" (2020, Northwest Indian Community Development Center)
