= Amelia Cornelius =

Native American artist (1938–2016)

- Born: January 28, 1938; Milwaukee, Wisconsin, U.S.
- Died: March 12, 2016 (aged 78)
- Known for: Traditional arts
- Children: 6

Amelia Margaret (Hawk) Cornelius (January 28, 1938 – March 12, 2016) was an artist from the Oneida Tribe of Wisconsin, United States known for her traditional Oneida corn bread and her corn husk dolls. Her corn husk dolls and service in Oneida Tribe have been noted as having helped to preserve the Oneida culture and language.

== Biography ==
Cornelius was born on January 28, 1939, to Arthur Hawk and Priscilla Jordan in Milwaukee, Wisconsin. Her grandparents were a large influence on Cornelius since her grandfather shared his experiences in tribal affairs and history, and she learned to create corn husk dolls from her grandmother Priscilla Jordan Hawk Manders, who in turn learned from Cornelius's great-grandmother Amelia Wheelock Jordan. Along with doll making, Cornelius often shared the history of corn husk dolls and its significance in Oneida culture to others through radio and doll making workshops. Amelia Cornelius died on March 12, 2016, at the age of 78, from lung cancer.

== Career ==
Cornelius served the Oneida Tribe as the Oneida Tribal Secretary for 16 years, the Oneida Gaming Assistant Manager for six years, the Oneida Gaming Commission for 13 years, and as the Director of the Oneida Bilingual/Bi-cultural Program for seven years. Cornelius was a project manager for building the original Anna John Nursing Home and an assistance in developing a grant for the Oneida Museum.

== Education ==
Cornelius earned a bachelor's degree in communication from UW Green Bay in June 1996.

== Corn husk dolls ==
Cornelius's corn husk dolls are faceless and are dressed in the traditional Oneida dress of men and women. The dolls are made of corn husk, cloth, beads, leather, yarn, wood, and feathers. The dolls were meant to portray the individual's life goal of discovering and following one's own humble path and to showcase how women played significant role in Oneida culture, which Cornelius felt was not emphasized enough. The corn husk dolls are also posed to make it look like if they were doing an activity. For the dolls, Cornelius researched traditional styles of Oneida clothing and accessories, bead work design, and traditional storytelling which uses metaphors and symbols; she also made her corn husk dolls for profit. Critics have stated that this enabled Cornelius to create dolls with deep cultural meanings and to teach younger generations about Oneida culture. To create the dolls Cornelius typically used white corn to extend the husk's length, which made it easier to create the doll. In order to have a plentiful supply, she grew her own white corn.

Corn (husk), beans and squash are considered cherished crops within the Oneida and are called "Three Sisters," an agricultural triumvirate. Three Sisters in the Oneida culture helped to nourish the Oneida and the usage of three crops used within the tribe is considered medicinal, ceremonial, and artistic. Using one of Three Sisters crops makes corn husk dolls significant to Oneida.

Cornelius has been credited as pioneering the use of corn husk dolls as a way to preserve Oneida culture since the dolls were initially used only as a toy and was declining in popularity.

== Legacy ==
On October 14, 2018, a dedication was held to commemorate the naming of the Amelia Cornelius Culture Park, which was built to celebrate the survival of indigenous people. The park opened with a tobacco burning to appreciate and offer prayer for survival of indigenous culture, tradition, and language, which Cornelius, an Oneida historian, had done with her service and corn husk dolls. The park annually features Oneida historians and Indigenous events at the park. The park also has historic homes that audiences can walk through to learn about Oneida history.

A social dinner and Ohe∙láku seed exchange was held on September 25, 2019, at the park, bringing tribal communities together. People participated at the event, wearing traditional clothing and sharing traditional seeds.

The Oneida Nation's 10th annual Big Apple Fest, a free community event, in Oneida, Wisconsin, was held on September 21, 2019, at the park, featuring horse-drawn wagon rides and an apple baking contest.

== Articles ==
- "The Archiquette Genealogy"
- "Tribal Discord and the Road to Green Bay"

== Exhibition ==
- "The raised bead work contest submission of corn husk dolls with outfit decorated with bead work motifs" at Bear Paw Keepsakes contest, WI, during October, 2006.

== Workshops ==
- "Corn husk dolls with Amelia Cornelius" at the Art Garage in Green Bay, Wisconsin, on Sep 16, 2015.
- "The art of making Corn husk dolls" at the 2003 University Summer Forum at UW–Madison on July 15, 2003.
- "Corn husk dolls demo" at the Indian Summer Festival in Milwaukee, Wisconsin, on August 18, 2010.
- "Corn Husk Doll Workshop" at the Multicultural Center in Green Bay on March 10, 2015.
- "Mother-daughter doll-making duo" at the 32nd Annual Smithsonian Folk life Festival at the National Mall in Washington, D.C., in 1998.

== Collection ==
- Marriott Residence Inns in Sacramento, California, and the District of Columbia.
1. Oneida Sachems 1(2009)
2. Just like Me (2012)
3. Four Directions (2012)
4. Oneida Sachems 1(2013)
- The Norbert Hill Center in Oneida.
1. Chieftain dolls (unknown date)
- Wisconsin Folk Museum
1. unknown {(unknown date) under category I. Manuscript Materials. James P. Leary}

== Honors and awards ==
- 2001 Oneida Fellowship by Dollar for Art Program
- 2006 The raised bead work contest winner sponsored by Bear Paw Keepsakes
- 2015 NACF Regional Artist Fellowship by Native Arts and Cultures Foundation
