= Frank Big Bear =

Native American artist from Minnesota (born 1953)

- Born: July 8, 1953 (age 73); Detroit Lakes, Minnesota
- Citizenship: Minnesota Chippewa Tribe, White Earth Band, U.S.
- Education: University of Minnesota: Minneapolis, MN
- Known for: Abstract drawings, paintings, and photo collages
- Website: frankbigbear.com

Frank Big Bear is a Native American artist born in Detroit Lakes, Minnesota and is a member of the Minnesota Chippewa Tribe, White Earth Band. As a multimedia Native artist, Big Bear is known for his colorful, abstract display through his drawings, paintings, and photo collages that address various messages about Big Bear's livelihood and worldly perception.

== Early life and education ==
Frank Big Bear was born on July 8, 1953, in Detroit Lakes, Minnesota. He was raised on the White Earth Reservation at Pine Point and is a member of the Minnesota Chippewa Tribe, White Earth Band. In 1968, at the age of 16, Big Bear moved to Minneapolis, Minnesota, to start his career as an artist and to work as a cab driver in order to support his family. During this time he attended North High School and went on to study Studio Arts at the University of Minnesota, where he studied alongside George Morrison.

Frank Big Bear continued to work as a cab driver for over thirty years. In 1973, he became an artist in residence at the Heart of the Earth School in Minneapolis.

== Career ==
Big Bear has described himself as a self-taught artist who creates art as a way to express himself and his emotions without displaying any additional attention upon himself. He has stated that when he lived in the Reservation, his inspiration mostly came from the immense imagination of his culture that at first was displayed through his dreams. Eventually, his worldly perspective became a merge between his identity within the Twin Cities and the Anishinabe tribe. As a reflection of this, his art began to display various messages of his native past, political issues, and symbolic images, as well as his personal journey to the discovery of his inner identity.

== Artworks ==
Big Bear uses various mediums in his art such as Prismacolor pencils and paint to create drawings, paintings, and photo collages that reflect his heritage, his people, and his various worlds. He has been compared to Picasso in that Big Bear uses a form of "cubism and surrealism" to create a reflection of the modern complexity of humankind using "highly personal signs, symbols, and images" used in a form of tribal storytelling.

=== Chemical Man in a Toxic World, Walker Art Center, 1989-1990 ===
Chemical Man in a Toxic World, a 90 x 44 unframed drawing that is currently displayed at the Walker Art Center in Minneapolis is a Prisma colored art piece that uses the technique of linearity and color to express Big Bear's perception of the world around him. Described as "a visual dictionary of images from Big Bear's world", Big Bear used the mediums of colored pencils and paper in order to create a diverse range of juxtaposing, vibrantly colored images.

One of the drawings that can be seen is a man with a "Live Hard Die Young" tattoo, on his left arm, and a woman covered with patterns and symbols standing across from the man. These displayed visual images are a representation of Big Bear's lived experiences as well as his political stance against the American Indian stereotype. As for Big Bear's unique style, he has continued to define a strong contrast between his images and vivid colors within each of his artworks.

=== From the Rez, to the Hood, to the Lake, All My Relations Arts, 2011 ===
Displayed at the All My Relations Arts in Minneapolis, this art gallery was the first reintroduction to Big Bear's career as a multimedia artist since his first painting show in 1970. His painting entitled "From the Rez, to the Hood, to the Lake" was created through an assemblage of "highly personalized signs, symbols, and images that reflect the complexity of contemporary humanity". Through this painted portrait, an individual is depicted with geometric shapes and patterns that is used throughout the canvas. While the individual is not clearly defined, Big Bear is known to draw people with whom he is familiar with, such as a family member or someone he often spends time with. This painting displays a common definition of modern art in which Big Bear's colorful stylistic choice has not only presented another abstract work of art, but its meaning has also expressed his Anishinabe tribal identity.

=== Mother of Fire/Sun of Water, Purdue Galleries, 2007 ===
This drawing, briefly displayed at Purdue Galleries in West Lafayette, Indiana, creates an example of Big Bear's use of pop and comic design to create a rich outlet for Big Bear's vivid imagination and storytelling. With his inspiration from the White Earth Reservation and his passed down tribal stories, Frank is often reminded of his spirituality and connection to his tribe and his people through these types of drawn art. Often feeling as if he lives in various worlds, Big Bear uses his skill in art to express his values and beliefs to the viewers such as the drawing of a woman of high regard who seems to bear a significance within nature to both the sun and water based on the viewer's inference of the given title. From what the viewer can see, this drawing retells the tale of a spiritual being and the role it plays amongst the Indian's contemporary urban path.

== Collections ==
Frank Big Bear's work is included in the:

- Smithsonian National Museum of the American Indian
- Dayton Hudson Collection, Minneapolis
- General Mills, Minneapolis
- Minneapolis Institute of Arts
- Minnesota Historical Society, St. Paul
- Minnesota Museum of American Art, St. Paul
- Plains Art Museum, Moorehead, Minnesota
- North Dakota Museum of Art, Grand Forks
- St. Cloud University, St. Cloud, Minnesota
- St. Paul Companies, Minnesota
- Walker Art Center, Minneapolis
- Frederick R. Weisman Art Museum, Minneapolis

== Publications and collaborations ==
- Drawings by Frank Big Bear (2009, with Andrea Carlson, Peter F. Spooner, and Doug Hanson)

== Select exhibitions ==
=== Special projects ===
- 2016-17 The Walker Collage, Multiverse #10, Walker Art Center commission for the Target Project Space
- 2003 Detritus of the Light People, mural created in collaboration with Star Wallowing Bull for the Plains Art Museum, Fargo MN
- 1994-98 Dream Catcher Love Song, Mayda Cortiella School, Brooklyn, The New York City Percent for Art Program

=== Solo exhibitions ===
- 2011 Frank Big Bear Paintings: From the Rez to the Hood to the Lake, curated by Heid Erdrich, All My Relations Gallery, Minneapolis (Jan 21 - Feb 28)
- 2008-11 Drawings by Frank Big Bear, Organized by the Tweed Museum of Art, University of Minnesota, Duluth, traveling exhibition, color catalogue
- 2000 Time Zones, Giddens Learning Center Gallery, Hamline University, St. Paul MN
- 1994 Out of the North: Frank Big Bear, Institute of American Indian Arts Museum, Santa Fe
- 1991 Rochester Art Center, Rochester MN
- 1989 Bethel College and Seminary, St. Paul MN
- 1987 North Dakota Museum of Art, Grand Forks, North Dakota
- 1987 Plains Art Museum, Fargo MN

=== Traveling group exhibitions ===
- 2015 Arriving at Fresh Water: Contemporary Native Artists from Our Great Lakes, Minneapolis Institute of Arts (May 9, 2015 - February 21, 2016); Plains Art Museum, Fargo ND (Oct 1, 2016 - Jan 7, 2017)
- 2013 Before and after the Horizon: Anishinaabe Artists of the Great Lakes, Smithson National Museum of the American Indian, George Gustav Heye Center (August 3 - June 15, 2014); Art Gallery of Ontario, Toronto (July 26, 2014 - Dec 7, 2014)

=== Selected group exhibitions ===
- 2014 Art at the center: 75 Years of Walker Collections, Walker Art Center
- 2010 Until Now: Collecting the New, Minneapolis Institute of Arts, Minneapolis curated by Elizabeth Armstrong
- 2007 New Dreaming: October Gallery, London, England
- 2003 Paper Warriors: the Drawings of Frank Big Bear and Star Wallowing Bull, Carl Gorman Museum, University of California, Davis
- 1993 Six McKnight Artists, MCAD Gallery, Minneapolis College of Art and Design
- 1992 The Ojibwe Art Expo: Centered Margins: Contemporary Art of the Americas Toward A Post-Colonial Culture, Bowling Green State University, Bowling Green OH & Enduring Strength: Two Rivers Gallery and Intermedia Arts Gallery, Minneapolis

== Fellowships, awards and grants ==
- 2015 USA Knight Fellow, United States Artists, Chicago
- 2015 Native Arts and Cultures Foundation Fellowship, Duluth
- 2013 Minnesota State Arts Board Artist Initiative Grant
- 2008 Bush Foundation, Enduring Vision Award, St Paul
- 1998 Bush Foundation Fellowship, St Paul
- 1992 McKnight Foundation Fellowship, Minneapolis
- 1986 Bush Foundation Fellowship, St Paul
- 1982 Jerome Foundation Fellowship, Minneapolis
