= Archibald Bush =

American businessman

Archibald Granville Bush (March 5, 1887 – January 16, 1966) was an American businessman primarily involved with 3M.

Bush was born in Granite Falls, Minnesota, and worked on the family farm as a youth, but his hay fever encouraged him to move to Duluth and study business. In 1914, he was hired as sales manager for the then-struggling 3M. He was working under the management of William L. McKnight and he helped the firm rise from near-bankruptcy to large-scale profitability. He remained the sales manager for some decades. In the late 1940s, he was elected executive vice-president. From 1949 to his death in 1966, he was chair of the company's executive committee. He purchased considerable 3M stock early on, and made a fortune during the company's turnaround. He used part of his estimated $200 million fortune to establish the charitable Bush Foundation in 1953, with the remainder of his fortune going to the foundation upon his death. He died in 1966 and is buried in Oakland Cemetery in Saint Paul.
