= Marques Hanalei Marzan =

Textile and fiber artist, sculptor

- Born: March 17, 1979 (age 47); Honolulu, Oʻahu, Hawaiʻi
- Education: University of Hawaiʻi at Mānoa
- Occupations: Cultural Advisor and The Wayne Pitluck and Judith Pyle Curator for Cultural Resilience
- Employer(s): Bishop Museum, Honolulu, Hawaiʻi

Marques Hanalei Marzan (born March 17, 1979) is a visual artist, chanter, dancer, scholar, and arts advocate of Hawaiian, Filipino, and Japanese descent. Marzan is best known for his fiber arts skill, experience, and knowledge in both Hawaiian customary and contemporary contexts. His work has been internationally collected and in the permanent collections of: Peabody Essex Museum, Linden Museum, British Museum, Te Papa Tongarewa, Field Museum, Capitol Modern.

He is the Cultural Advisor and The Wayne Pitluck and Judith Pyle Curator for Cultural Resilience at Bishop Museum in Honolulu, Hawaiʻi.

== Early life and education ==
Marzan was born on Oʻahu and graduated from James B. Castle High School in 1997. His father is Filipino and his mother is of Japanese and Native Hawaiian descent. His artistic practice draws upon cultural stories, methodologies, and beliefs associated with his multi-ethnic heritage. He received his B.F.A. in Art from the University of Hawai'i at Mānoa in 2002 and his M.F.A in Applied Art from Emily Carr University of Art and Design in Vancouver, Canada in 2024.

== Career ==
Marzan began exhibiting his art in 1999, first showing in local venues and juried exhibitions. Since then, his work has been presented in national and international curated exhibitions.

== Awards and recognition ==
Marzan received awards and recognition for his artistic practice that include:

- 2023 United States Artists Fellow
- 2022 NDN Collective Radical Imagination Artist
- 2018 Native Arts and Cultures Foundation National Fellowship
- 2015 Native Arts and Cultures Foundation Regional Fellowship
