= TahNibaa Naataanii =

Native American traditional artist

- TahNibaa Aglohiigiih
- Born: TahNibaa Aglohiigiih; May 5, 1967 (age 59); Shiprock, New Mexico, U.S.
- Citizenship: Navajo (Diné)
- Occupation: Weaver
- Known for: Weaving
- Notable work: Spider Woman Shoulder Blanket, Mother Earth Shawl, Second Phase Chief Shoulder Blanket
- Style: Traditional
- Predecessor: Sarah Natani
- Parents: Leo Natani (father); Sarah Natani (mother)
- Honours: Heard Museum Fair, Eight Northern Pueblo Arts and Craft Fair, Gallup Intertribal Ceremonial, Santa Fe Fiber Art Show

TahNibaa Naataanii (born May 5, 1967) is a Native American traditional artist and a member of the Navajo Tribe. She has espoused a belief that creativity should be allowed to be the source of art and that artists should not have to confine themselves to a particular style. Naataanii has also stated that weaving art and tradition should be passed along to present and future generations, with her art techniques and mediums being the traditional form, and artistic style dependent on the artist.

== Biography ==
Naataanii was born on May 5, 1967, in Shiprock, New Mexico, to Sarah H. Natani, a weaver. Her paternal grandmother gave her the name TahNibaa Aglohiigiih, which means "TahNibaa the Weaver". By the age of five Naataanii had moved away from her birthplace and was attending kindergarten in Fort Defiance, Arizona.

She was taught how to weave when she was seven and when she was ten, her family moved to Table Mesa, about 12 miles south from her birthplace. Naataanii continued to weave during the summers up until she finished high school, selling what she wove so she could buy herself new clothes for the next academic year. While attending school Naataanii found it difficult to live with the Biligaana (white people) and Diné (own people) at the same time, often having both cultural and societal forms of living interfering with one another. After completing high school she enlisted in the U.S. Navy. Naataannii has stated that she enlisted because she wanted to travel the country but instead she traveled the world.

Naataanii was unable to weave for five years while she was enlisted and has recalled traveling to countries like the Philippines and Thailand, being in indigenous neighborhoods, and seeing people living like in some reservations where certain technologies and things like running water were not present. Whilst there, she was also able to see weavings from those particular cultures during that time, and even stating she felt a connection with these cultures.

During a brief stint in California, her mother decided to send her weaving supplies and tools and decided to begin weaving again. After acquiring a bachelor's degree in Environmental Management from the Northern New Mexico College, she was offered a position as a bio-scientist, but rejected that opportunity and decided to pursue in order to pursue weaving full time.

During March 2016 she took training from The Business of Indian Agriculture.

== Art style and philosophy ==
When asked about inspiration and her creative process, Naataanii has stated that the best way to weave is to not stick to the rules or boundaries set by other weaving artists of past generations. Her work has been described as traditional by multiple institutions and artists in that the background behind the piece and patterns used are inspired by aspects of her native culture. Naataanii uses both traditional and non-traditional colors and raises her own sheep, which she sheers to create the dyed yarn used in her art.

Naataanii has espoused a determination to keep Navajo weaving traditions alive, and has become recognized as a mentor and teacher of Diné weaving practice, including sheep farming, wool harvesting and dyeing, and traditional weaving songs and protocols.

== Select artworks ==
- '''The Mother Earth Shawl (2010)

The Mother Earth Shawl piece was created in 2010 by Naataanii. This piece contains the usage of sky blues and reds and displays symmetry.She used traditional mediums such as wool and pigments for dyes to create the red and blue colors.

- '''Second Phase Shoulder blanket (2011)

In her Second Phase Shoulder blanket created in 2011. This piece uses traditional mediums such as wool and pigments for dyes. Like most Phase II blankets they had red blocks on the ends and blue stripes going across as well as the use of traditional geometric shapes and patterns such as crosses and blocks.

- Spider Woman Shoulder blanket (2011)

Naataanii created her Spider Woman Shoulder Blanket in 2011. She used mediums such as wool and natural pigments to create the dyes used for the piece.

== Exhibitions ==
On March 6, 2020, an exhibition of Naataanii's work was held at the Heard Museum Indian Fair and Market, alongside other Native American Artists from a variety of different tribes.

== Honors and awards ==
Throughout the years weaving, Naataanii has won several awards for best pieces, and best shows. She has won such awards in the Santa Fe Fiber Art Show on multiple occasions as well as winning awards in The Heard Museum Indian Fair and Market as well as in the Gallup Intertribal Ceremonial and the Eight Northern Pueblo Arts and Craft Fair.

- NACF Mentor Artist Fellowship, 2017
- First place in Traditional Arts, Prescott Indian Art Market, 2018
- First place in Contemporary Woven Textiles, Santa Fe Indian Market, 2018
- She is a recipient of a 2022 National Heritage Fellowship awarded by the National Endowment for the Arts, which is the United States government's highest honor in the folk and traditional arts.
