= Valerie Pourier =

American artist

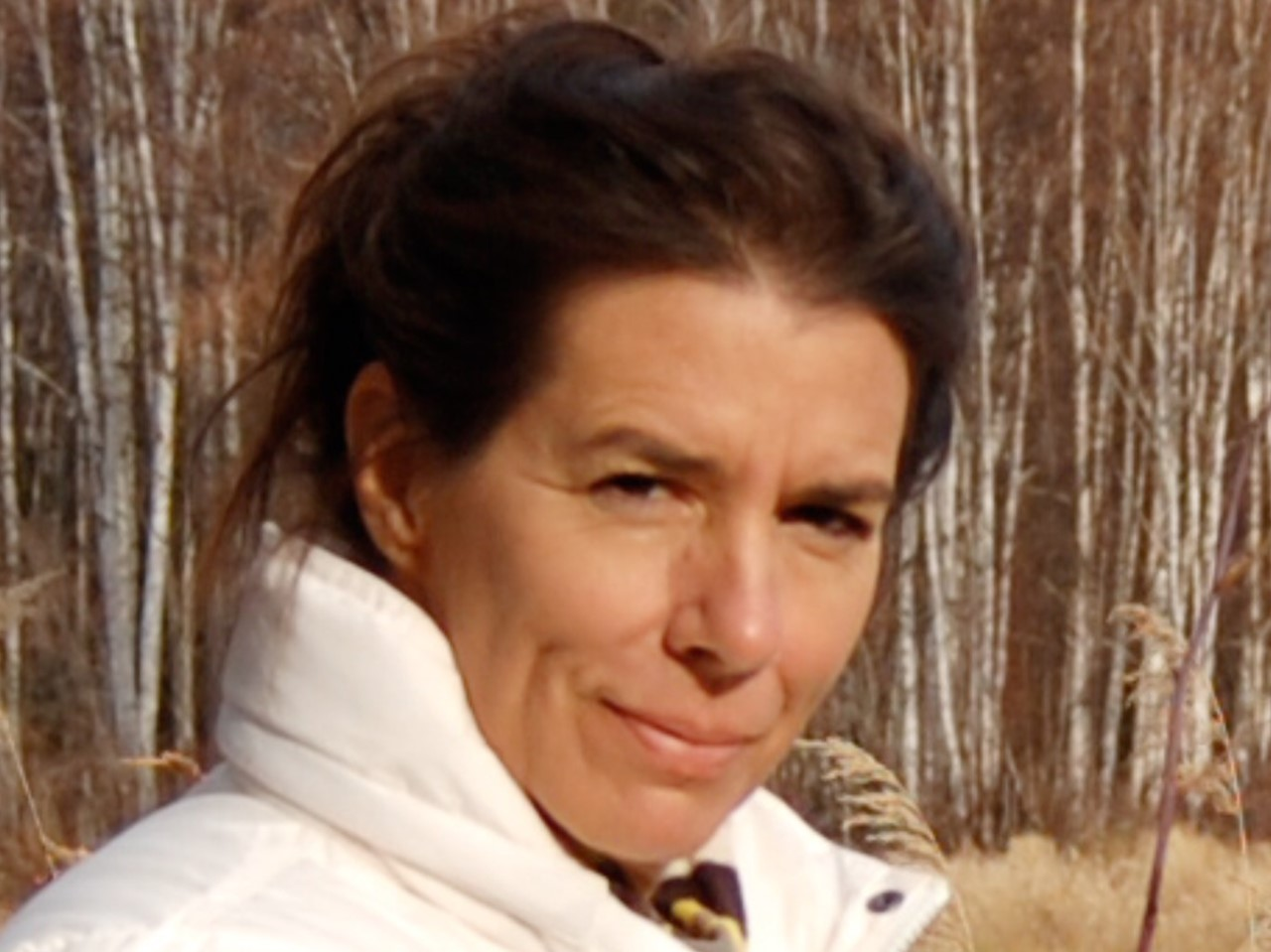
- Born: 1959; Marine Corps Base Camp Pendleton
- Occupation: Artist
- Spouse(s): Kevin Pourier

Valerie Pourier (b. 1959, Marine Corps Base Camp Pendleton, California) is an Oglala-Lakota artist known for buffalo horn fabrications. She works with her husband Kevin Pourier. They are located at the Pine Ridge Reservation in South Dakota. The couple create wearable art from carved buffalo horn.

The couple's work is in the collection of the Nelson-Atkins Museum of Art. Their piece Winyan Wánakikśin (Women Defenders of Others) was exhibited at the National Museum of the American Indian. Their piece, Monarch Nation, was acquired by the Smithsonian American Art Museum as part of the Renwick Gallery's 50th Anniversary Campaign.
