= April Stone =

American basket weaver

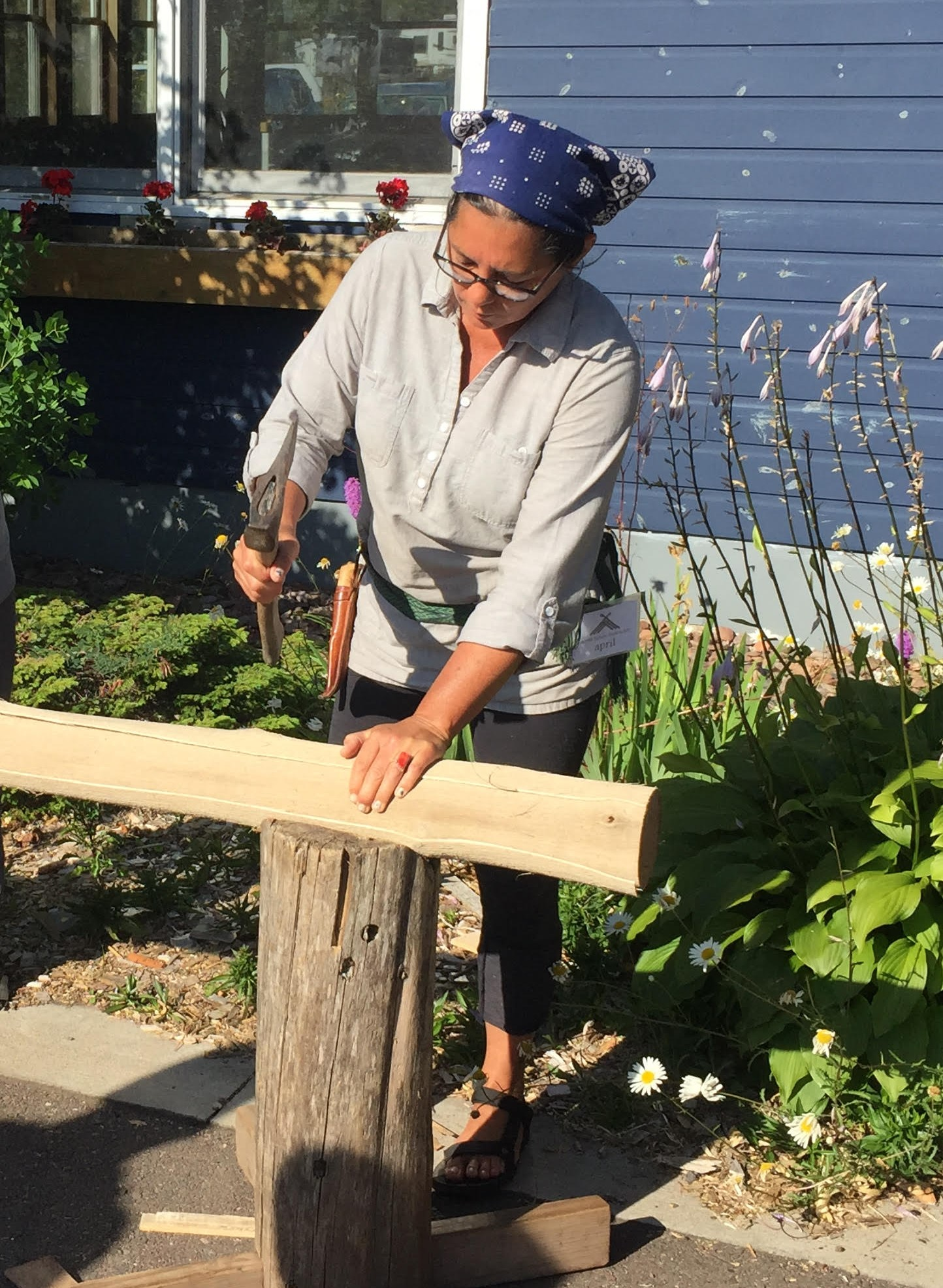
- April Stone pounding black ash into splints for a class at North House Folk School in Grand Marais, MN
- Known for: Black ash basket weaver

April Stone is a basket weaver, who is a member of the Bad River Band of Lake Superior Chippewa (Ojibwe) from Wisconsin. Stone is a full-time artisan who teaches classes and sells her baskets all over the Midwest.

== Early life ==
April Stone started working with black ash in 1998 with her then-husband Jarod Dahl after taking classes at North House Folk School in Grand Marais, Minnesota. She attributes her interest in and passion for black ash basketry to her experience of fixing Dahl's broken basket that had become his daily lunch bag. Not finding any black-ash basket-weavers in her tribe or community, she taught herself to weave through reading books and studying baskets in museum collections. Stone and Dahl together created the business Woodspirit Handcraft in which they created traditional basketry and kitchen wares combining their Objibwe and Scandinavian roots.

== Work ==
Stone's basket-making is inspired by natural resources and living off the land. She harvests the black ash by hand through a process of pounding a freshly-cut log until the rings of the tree delaminate into splints of rough material which is then split and processed into strips for weaving. As well as utilitarian and functional objects, Stone uses her work to speak about the devastation of the black ash tree as a result of the emerald ash borer, an invasive species. In 2015 she received a Regional Artist Fellowship from the Native Arts and Cultures Foundation to create an ash burial basket as a tribute to the dying black ash Tree. Woven partially in a public space with the help of dozens of community members, Stone spent over 100 hours creating this burial basket which was acquired by the Minnesota Historical Society.
