= Michael Wasson =

American Nimíipuu poet

Michael Wasson (born 1990) is an American Nimíipuu poet from the town of Lenore, Idaho on the Nez Perce Reservation. He currently lives in Fukuoka, Japan.

== Career ==
Michael Wasson grew up on the Nez Perce reservation in Idaho, and recalls that landscape, his elders, and their stories and language as having a formative impact on his writing. He earned his BA studying literature, creative writing and his indigenous Nez Perce language, Nimipuutímt, at Lewis-Clark State College and an MFA in creative writing from Oregon State University while teaching writing courses. He has also taught literature, writing, and English in Tokyo, Japan, and he currently lives in Fukuoka, on the island of Kyushu, in Japan. He has been reported to have lived there since 2014 where he worked as an English and English Conversational teacher.

His work has also been used as an example in a short form creative writing anthology used to teach poetry and short fiction. His first book, This American Ghost, ranges across topics from classical Greek literature to the violence done by Christianity and colonialism to the cultural experiences of Nez Perce people.

== Awards and nominations ==
Wasson is the recipient of a Native Arts and Cultures Foundation National Artist Fellowship in Literature, the Adrienne Rich Award for Poetry, the Vinyl 45 Chapbook Prize, and the Joyce Carol Oates Commencement Award in Poetry. In 2019 he was awarded a Ruth Lilly and Dorothy Sargent Rosenberg Poetry Fellowship from the Poetry Foundation.

== Publications ==
- Swallowed Light (2021) – ISBN 9781556596001
- This American Ghost (2017) – ISBN 978-1-936919-52-9
