= Patrick William Kruse =

Native American culture teacher and artist

- Born: January 26, 1971 (age 55)
- Citizenship: Native American (Ojibwe)
- Education: Bug-O-Ney-Ge-Shig School
- Occupations: Birchbark and quillwork artist, as well as culture teacher

Patrick William Kruse, also known as Pat Kruse, (born January 26, 1971) is a Native American culture teacher and artist that specializes in birchbark art and quillwork. He works alongside his son Gage to create birch bark paintings.

== Early life and education ==
Kruse was born on January 26, 1971, in Oakland, California, and was raised in the Mille Lacs Reservation. He is part French and German on his father's side of the family and is a member of The Red Cliff Band of Anashinabe (specifically of Lake Superior Chippewa) and is also a part of the Mille Lacs Band of Objiwe. When he was eight years old he attended the Bug-O-Ney-Ge-Shig "Bug" school, a school intended to satisfy the cultural and academic needs of Native American children. While at the school Kruse became interested in learning more about the traditions of his cultures. He also learned how to make art by watching other members in his tribe such as his mother, Clara Kruse, who was trained in traditional art forms. They taught him that birch bark is sacred, and should not be wasted and his mother urged him to create more traditional, decorative Ojibwe style pieces.

== Art process ==
While creating his art Kruse tries to stick to the traditional values of his culture by using the techniques created by his ancestors. He has stated that he feels that his ancestors are communicating with him while he makes his art. In order to harvest the birch bark needed to create his art, Kruse and his son Gage scavenge for bark through the woods throughout the spring, summer, and fall, so that they can spend the winter months creating the art itself. Upon attaining the necessary bark, boiling water is poured over it in order to shape the wood into a canoe, basket, or almost any other form. Kruse's technique in particular does not always utilize the boiling water. Once the shape is formed by bending the birchbark a design can be added utilizing his quillwork skills. Kruse has described the birch bark gathering and artistic process as a great survival tool, as it can be used to make drinking cups, storage containers, trays, and canoes.

Kruse himself primarily creates intricate baskets and paintings, where he creates the compositions while his son sews it together with deer sinew. He dries the bark for a month so the water can evaporate and it dries out. Then, he has to cut and bend the wood into specific shapes, in order to create items such as baskets. Upon cutting the necessary shapes, the artwork is tied together to retain the shape, and it is sewed together to keep its final form. Then, using a sharp tool (called a magoos), Kruse sketches out intricate art on the sides of his baskets and creates his quillwork art to decorate the basket.

== Artworks ==
- "Nature's Beauty", birch bark mural (September 2015, with Gage Kruse)
- "My Brother's Blanket Number One", birch bark, deer sinew, maple seedpods, and red willow (2010, with Gage Kruse and Jim Proctor)
- "All Races Bouquet number 6", wood, birch bark, deer sinew, red willow, and fabric, (2010)
- "Celebration of Life" (2019, with Terri Hom)

== Exhibitions ==
- Mille Lacs Indian Museum (April 2015, group exhibit)
- Renewing What They Gave Us Exhibit, Minnesota Historical Society (September 2017, group exhibit)

== Collections ==
- Plains Art Museum, Fargo
- Tweed Museum of Art, University of Minnesota, Duluth
- Mille Lacs Indian Museum, Minnesota Historical Society, Onamia MN
- Red Cliff Band of Lake Superior Chippewas, Legendary Waters Resort and Casino, Red Cliff WI
- Mayo Clinic, Rochester MN Science Museum of Minnesota, St Paul

== Honors and awards ==
In 2018 Kruse won the Mentor Artist Fellowship Award for the art he creates with a small amount of resources. The purpose of this fellowship is to support Native artists and allow them to make more art, have a stable income, and add to their community's culture.
