= Kevin Pourier =

American artist

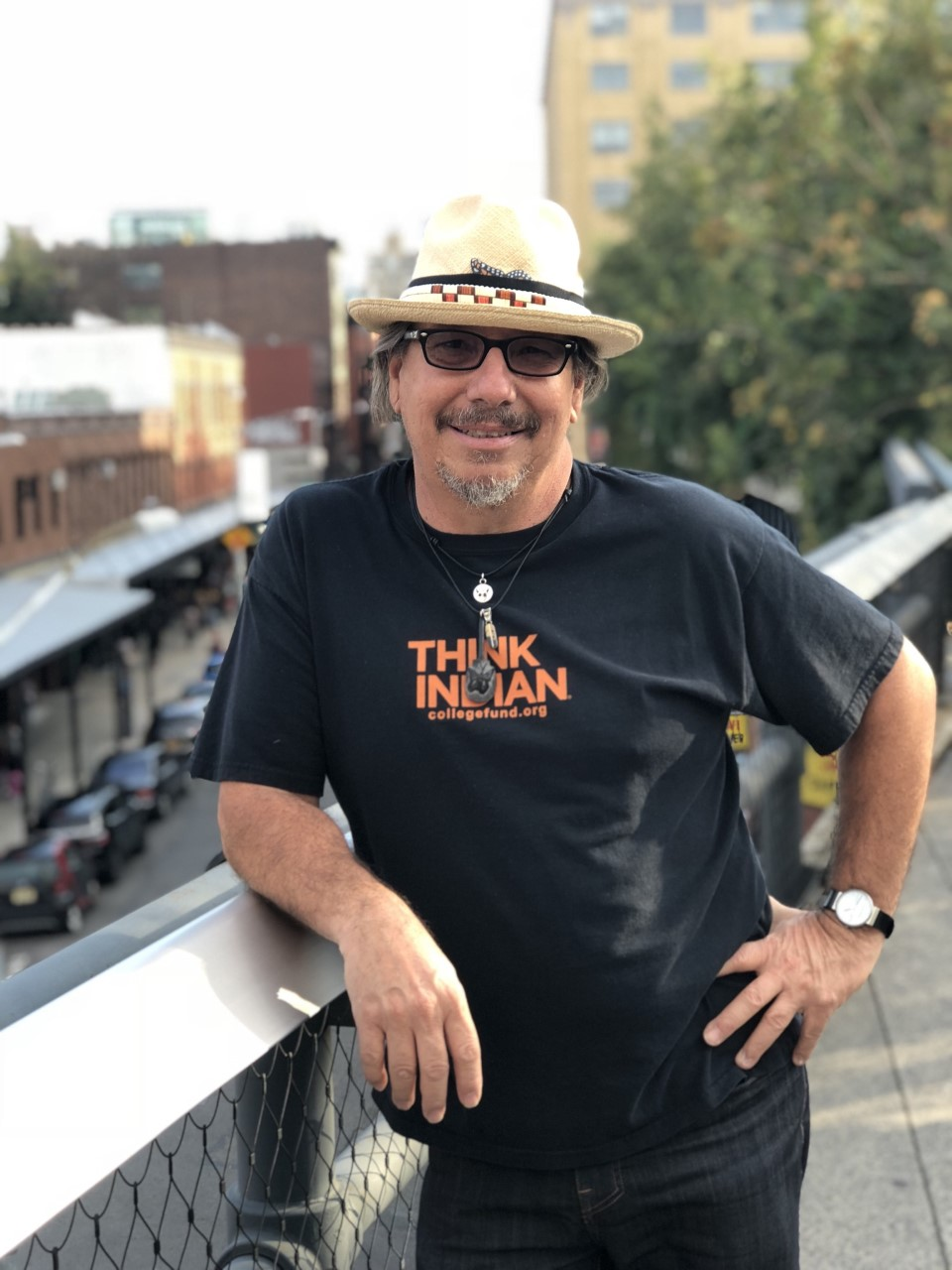
- Born: 12 December 1958; Rapid City
- Occupation: Artist
- Spouse: Valerie Pourier
- Website: www.kevinpourier.com

Kevin Pourier (b. 1958, Rapid City, South Dakota) is an Oglala-Lakota artist known for buffalo horn fabrications. He works with his wife Valerie Pourier. They are located at the Pine Ridge Reservation in South Dakota. The couple create wearable art from carved buffalo horn.

Kevin participated in the National Museum of the American Indian's Native Arts Program in 2005. The couple's work is in the collection of the Nelson-Atkins Museum of Art. Their piece Winyan Wánakikśin (Women Defenders of Others) was exhibited at the National Museum of the American Indian. Their piece, Monarch Nation, was acquired by the Smithsonian American Art Museum as part of the Renwick Gallery's 50th Anniversary Campaign.
