= Kelli Jo Ford =

American author (born 1975)

- Born: April 19, 1975 (age 51) Tahlequah, Oklahoma, United States
- Occupation: Author
- Education: Loyola University New Orleans, George Mason University

Website
- kellijoford.com

Kelli Jo Ford (born April 19, 1975) is a Cherokee author. Her novel-in-stories, Crooked Hallelujah, was one of NPR's "Books We Love" selections for 2020 and a New York Times Editors' Choice selection.

Ford is a citizen of the Cherokee Nation and lives in Virginia. She teaches in the MFA program of the Institute of American Indian Arts.

== Early life and education ==
Ford was born in Tahlequah, Oklahoma, at the W.W. Hastings Indian Hospital, the only child of Valerie Hancock (nee Ford) and Joe Tom Hancock. In her early years, she was raised in and around the Holiness Church. The family later moved to Nocona, Texas, where Ford attended high school.

She later graduated with a bachelor's degree from Loyola University New Orleans and earned an MFA from George Mason University in Fairfax, Virginia, where she studied fiction with Alan Cheuse, Richard Bausch, and Stephen Goodwin.

== Writing career ==
Her novel-in-stories, Crooked Hallelujah, was one of NPR's "Books We Love" selections for 2020 and a New York Times Editors' Choice selection.

In addition to Crooked Hallelujah, Ford has published short stories in numerous literary journals and magazines. Her short story "Hybrid Vigor" won The Paris Review's 2019 Plimpton Prize and the opening story of Crooked Hallelujah, "Book of Generations", was awarded The Missouri Review's 2018 Peden Prize. Ford's story "Reney, Mostly" was featured in McSweeney's 2021 audio issue.

Ford has said that the characters in Crooked Hallelujah were inspired by the maternal figures in her own family. Ford told NPR that her book's title was "an exclamation of the beauty of the relationships between mothers and daughters, despite hardships and despite disagreements." Ford's fiction often centers on themes of place, home, and family relationships among generations of women. It also deals with the effects of transgenerational trauma, the role of religion in people's lives, and the root causes of cycles of abuse and poverty.

== Bibliography ==
- Crooked Hallelujah. Grove Atlantic. 2020. ISBN 978-0-8021-4912-1.
- "Reney, Mostly". McSweeney's. No. 64. Fall 2021.
- "The Year 2003 Minus 20". Virginia Quarterly Review. Vol. 96, no. 1. Spring 2020.
- "Hybrid Vigor". The Paris Review. No. 227. Winter 2018.
- "Book of the Generations". The Missouri Review. Vol. 40, no. 3. Fall 2017.
- "You Will Miss Me When I Burn". Virginia Quarterly Review. Vol. 92, no. 2. Spring 2016.
- "Terra Firma". The SFWP Quarterly. No. 3. Fall 2015.
- "Bonita". New Delta Review. Spring 2015.
- "What Good is an Ark to a Fish?". Forty Stories: New Writing from Harper Perennial. Harper Perennial. 2012. ISBN 978-0-0622-3906-8.
