= Shafer, Minnesota =

City in Minnesota, United States

Shafer
- City
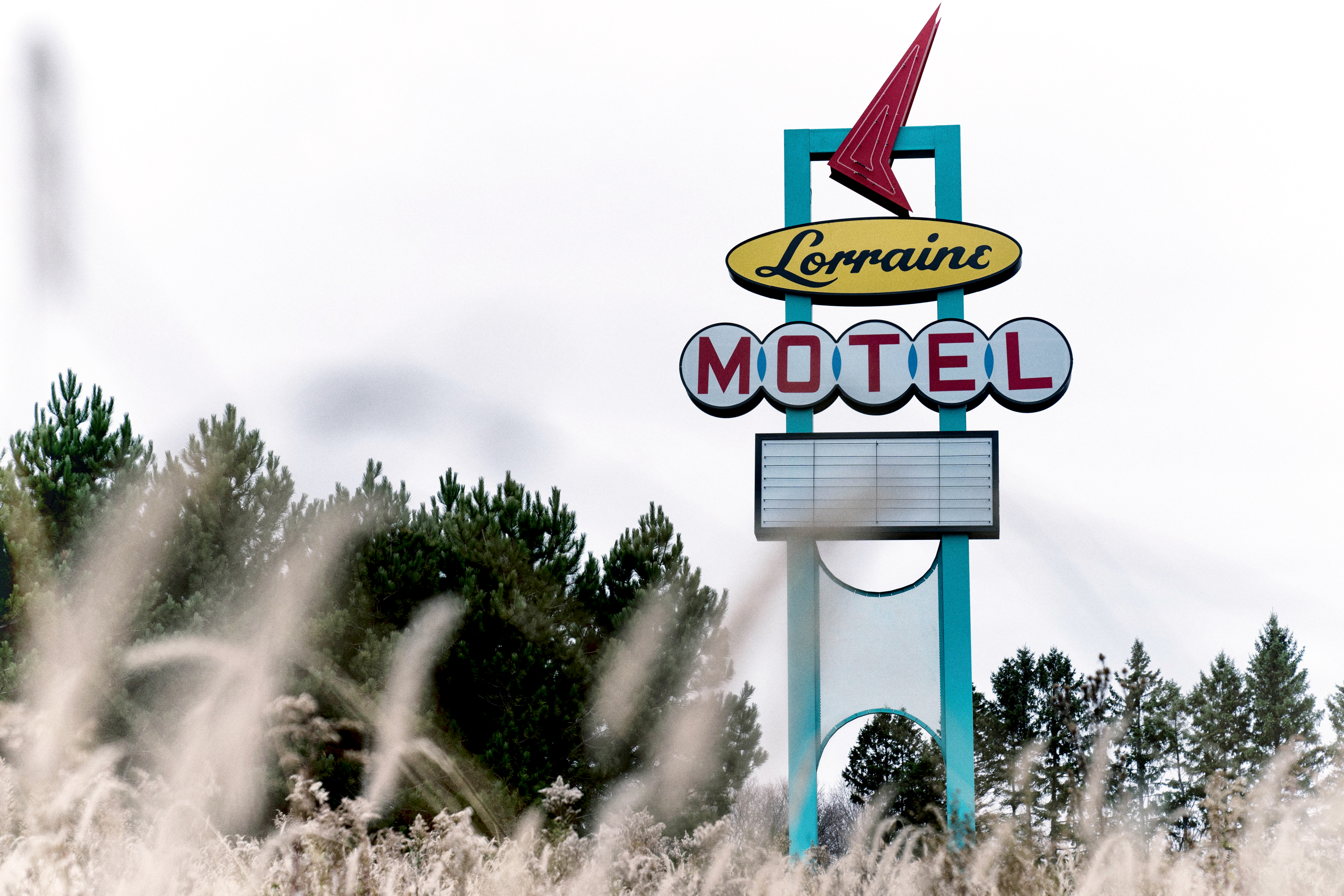
- Lorraine Motel Sign Resited to Shafer, by Chris Larson, 2016

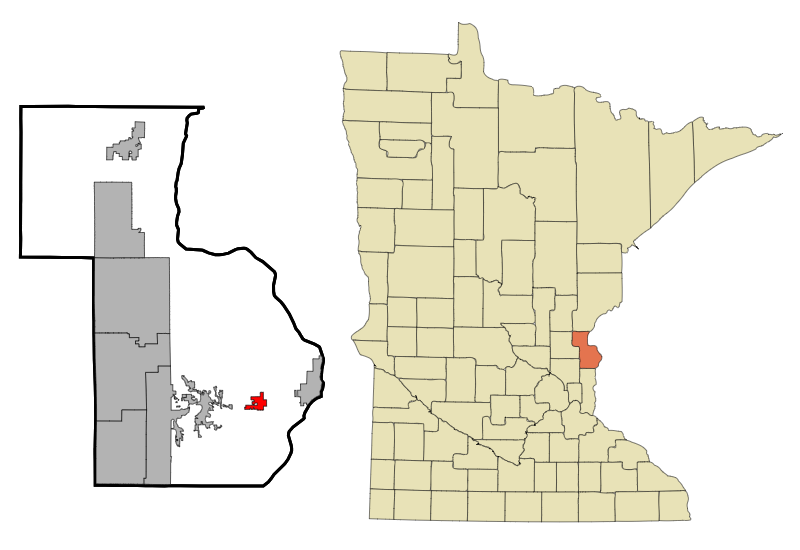
- Location of the city of Shafer within Chisago County, Minnesota
- Coordinates: 45°23′9″N 92°44′52″W
- Country: United States
- State: Minnesota
- County: Chisago

Area
  - Total: 1.26 sq mi (3.26 km^{2})
  - Land: 1.25 sq mi (3.25 km^{2})
  - Water: 0.0039 sq mi (0.01 km^{2})
- Elevation: 938 ft (286 m)

Population (2020)
  - Total: 1,142
  - Density: 911.4/sq mi (351.91/km^{2})
- Time zone: UTC-6 (Central (CST))
  - Summer (DST): UTC-5 (CDT)
- ZIP code: 55074
- Area code: 651
- FIPS code: 27-59314
- GNIS feature ID: 2395853
- Website: https://cityofshafer.gov/

Shafer is a city in Chisago County, Minnesota, United States. As of the 2020 census, Shafer had a population of 1,142. The city was named for Jacob Shafer, a pioneer settler.

U.S. Highway 8 serves as a main route for the community.

== Geography ==
According to the United States Census Bureau, the city has a total area of 1.27 square miles (3.29 km^{2}), all land. The Shafer watertower is the highest vertical point in the county.

== Festival ==
The city holds the Shafer Days celebration in early October.

== Demographics ==
Historical population
Census	Pop.	Note	%±
1930	117		—
1940	106		−9.4%
1950	127		19.8%
1960	147		15.7%
1970	149		1.4%
1980	180		20.8%
1990	368		104.4%
2000	343		−6.8%
2010	1,045		204.7%
2020	1,142		9.3%
U.S. Decennial Census

=== 2010 census ===
As of the census of 2010, there were 1,045 people, 379 households, and 272 families residing in the city. The population density was 822.8 inhabitants per square mile (317.7/km^{2}). There were 402 housing units at an average density of 316.5 per square mile (122.2/km^{2}). The racial makeup of the city was 96.4% White, 0.5% African American, 0.3% Native American, 0.2% Asian, 1.1% from other races, and 1.6% from two or more races. Hispanic or Latino of any race were 2.0% of the population.

There were 379 households, of which 50.1% had children under the age of 18 living with them, 52.8% were married couples living together, 11.1% had a female householder with no husband present, 7.9% had a male householder with no wife present, and 28.2% were non-families. 19.5% of all households were made up of individuals, and 1.4% had someone living alone who was 65 years of age or older. The average household size was 2.76 and the average family size was 3.18.

The median age in the city was 29.4 years. 33.9% of residents were under the age of 18; 5.8% were between the ages of 18 and 24; 38.2% were from 25 to 44; 17.4% were from 45 to 64; and 4.7% were 65 years of age or older. The gender makeup of the city was 51.7% male and 48.3% female.

=== 2000 census ===
As of the census of 2000, there were 343 people, 124 households, and 93 families residing in the city. The population density was 540.7 inhabitants per square mile (208.8/km^{2}). There were 129 housing units at an average density of 203.4 per square mile (78.5/km^{2}). The racial makeup of the city was 99.13% White, 0.29% African American, and 0.58% from two or more races. Hispanic or Latino of any race were 1.75% of the population.

There were 124 households, out of which 41.1% had children under the age of 18 living with them, 46.0% were married couples living together, 23.4% had a female householder with no husband present, and 25.0% were non-families. 21.0% of all households were made up of individuals, and 0.8% had someone living alone who was 65 years of age or older. The average household size was 2.77 and the average family size was 3.09.

In the city, the population was spread out, with 32.9% under the age of 18, 8.2% from 18 to 24, 32.7% from 25 to 44, 19.2% from 45 to 64, and 7.0% who were 65 years of age or older. The median age was 31 years. For every 100 females, there were 99.4 males. For every 100 females age 18 and over, there were 94.9 males.

The median income for a household in the city was $41,667, and the median income for a family was $43,000. Males had a median income of $32,656 versus $27,250 for females. The per capita income for the city was $17,561. About 5.1% of families and 9.1% of the population were below the poverty line, including 14.2% of those under age 18 and none of those age 65 or over.

== See also ==
- Chisago Lakes School District
