= Andrea Carlson =

American painter (born 1979)

- Born: 1979 (age 46–47)
- Education: University of Minnesota; Minneapolis College of Art and Design (MFA)
- Known for: mixed-media
- Website: mikinaak.com

Andrea Carlson (born 1979) is a mixed-media American visual artist currently based in Chicago. She also maintains a studio space and has a strong artistic presence in Minneapolis–Saint Paul, Minnesota. Her art works to challenge the "power dynamics between museums and Indigenous communities". Questioning established hierarchies, "considers who holds the rights of possession, and investigates how those overlap and overshadow the lived experiences of those disadvantaged through empirical systems" all through her mixed-media style.

== Education ==
Carlson is a descendant of the Grand Portage Band of the Minnesota Chippewa Tribe. She earned a BA in studio arts and American Indian studies (language emphasis) from the University of Minnesota in 2003. She has stated that "the greatest gift I took from American Indian Studies is the Ojibwe Language." In 2005, she earned an MFA in Visual Studies from the Minneapolis College of Art and Design.

== Art career ==
Carlson draws from her Anishinaabe, French, and Scandinavian heritages as a basis for her highly stylized work. She utilizes her background to investigate themes like cultural use, culture and personality, and the inherent influence of storytelling. She was influenced by the Grand Portage Ojibwe artist George Morrison. Growing up, Carlson's father, a hyperrealist painter, taught her the "foundations of drawing and painting" before she could read. Her father's support of her early artistic endeavors gave her the confidence that "she would be understood, and her efforts would be taken seriously."

Carlson creates much of her art on paper, using acrylic and oil paint, watercolor, gouache, pen and ink, graphite, and colored pencil to create her evocative and enigmatic tales. She frequently works on a wide scale, combining hyper-realistic photographs with indeterminate space or graphic patterning to produce a world that is both familiar and foreign.

Carlson also explores the role of the museum in the representation and interpretation of cultural objects. She has said that "By citing pieces from the museum's collection in my artwork, I appropriate those objects by drawing them into imagined landscapes. The museum is a landscape in its own right, fostering and assimilating objects foreign to itself." Carlson's work and writing challenges museums to evolve beyond long-standing Western institutional paradigms, and to grapple with their colonial past. She brings to light the tradition of museums acquiring objects and collections through invasion, conquest, and colonization. The holder will then explain the object's origins and cultural importance after it has been shown. "If you have everyone's objects, you have to tell the story for the objects, that's part of domination. We take museums as authority when often times they are relying on pretty fictitious information."

Carlson has employed cannibalism as a metaphor for cultural consumption in her paintings' titles and imagery, naming her "Windigo Series" for an Anishinaabe winter cannibal that often misidentifies those it consumes. The cannibal creature made of ice known as Windigo (also rendered Wendigo, or Wiindigoo) is known for eating everything and everyone in sight. The only way the creature could be slain was by a "trickster, a young gambler, or a little girl". Heid E. Erdrich identifies with Carlson's work in these ways saying that she likes "to see similar gambles and tricks at work in Andrea Carlson's paintings and films". In reference to Carlson's critiques on colonization, dominance, and possession that overlays our countries history, Carlson references Windigo in a means to say, "no matter how hungry you are, you will not eat us. We will eat everything we see and offer it back to you, in exquisitely rendered detail, but you will not eat us in the end. We will trick you if we have to, Andrea Carlson says, but we will survive."

Her ongoing series, VORE, uses cannibalism as a metaphor for problems of ethnic exploitation, consumption, and assimilation in its work. Using various media on paper to create objects from museum collections that float over pop-art influenced ranges, while Carlson's own heritage is hinted at in the background. Her artworks are inspired by the narrative of an object and how these objects are used as surrogates for cultural communication, as seen in her series VORE, storytelling as a means of conveying power and authority.

Her work has exhibited widely while gaining support through several fellowships including the Minnesota State Arts Board (2006) and McKnight/MCAD Foundation Fellowship (2007–08). Carlson was a participant in Plug In ICA’s Summer Institute in 2010.

One of the many artworks of Andrea Carlson’s VORE series is a painting titled Sunshine on a Cannibal. She created it in 2015 and used oil, acrylic, ink, granite, and color pencil on paper to create an extensive horizontal painting. She drew small images from Native American art, European paintings, and conceptual art then layered these images in the shape of a pyramid on the center of her painting. She purposefully arranges the small images into rows and columns to form the pyramid and heavily layers them, adding more meaning to her message on western culture and assimilation. She further creates this illusion of a pyramid by drawing an empty and dull setting for the background of the rest of her piece that contrasts against the heavy imagery she paints. On the bottom of the metaphorical pyramid the artist paints disembodied hands and skinless faces that spell out “Sunshine on a Cannibal” across the center bottom. The purpose of this series and the metaphors included within her art is to challenge the viewer to stop and think about the “other” in our society and to think about how western cultures idolize and heighten more “exotic” cultures while still trying to erase that same culture with assimilation.

== Themes ==
Andrea Carlson has described her own art as commenting on “entangled cultural narratives and institutional authority … Indigenous Futurisms and assimilation metaphors in film.”

Indigenous Futurism work "helps us to think critically about tradition, revolution, and reconstructive practices in our built environments." Carlson's work responds to this and "dreams up a world that is of the now as much as it is of a future to come." Her take on Indigenous Futurism is about healing, truth-telling, reexamining the past and reexamining the future.

Andrea Carlson’s work focuses on how stereotypes prevail in American narratives of Indigenous peoples. She stated that these fictional ideas of who they should be makes it so, “[a]ny changes to that code render them ‘unauthentic’ and cultures are institutionally killed.”

For example, in her print Exit (2019, screen print) Carlson has stated that the piece comments on a “deep-seated fear of losing cultural practices, languages and art forms,” as represented by the exit sign. Many of the symbols in the print also reference indigenous creations that have been wrongfully appropriated by people who did not originate from them.

Carlson has long drawn visual influence from film and movie culture, and in some of her works, she plays with cinematic conventions, asks the audience to act as the viewfinder, and encourages viewers to reconsider what they're seeing and how they're seeing it.

== Solo exhibitions ==
- 2025-26: Andrea Carlson: A Constant Sky, Denver Art Museum, Denver, CO, October 5, 2025 - February 16, 2026

== Group exhibitions ==
- 2020-21: Don't Let This Be Easy at Walker Art Center, Minneapolis, MN, July 30, 2020 - July 4, 2021
- 2019–21: Hearts of Our People: Native Women Artists, traveling exhibition, June 2 - August 18, 2019 at Minneapolis Institute of Art, Minneapolis, MN; September 27, 2019 - January 12, 2020 at Frist Art Museum, Nashville, TN; February 21 - May 17, 2020 at Renwick Gallery, Smithsonian American Art Museum, Washington, DC; June 27 - September 13, 2020 at Philbrook Museum of Art, Tulsa, OK.
- 2018–19: Art for a New Understanding: Native Voices, 1950s to Now, Crystal Bridges Museum of American Art, Bentonville, AR
- 2024-2025: Shimmer on Horizons at Museum of Contemporary Art Chicago, Chicago, IL

== Collections ==
Her work is included in the permanent collections of the Walker Art Center, Weisman Art Museum, the British Museum, and the National Gallery of Canada.
