= Plains Art Museum =

Museum in North Dakota, United States

Coordinates: 46°52′37″N 96°47′32″W

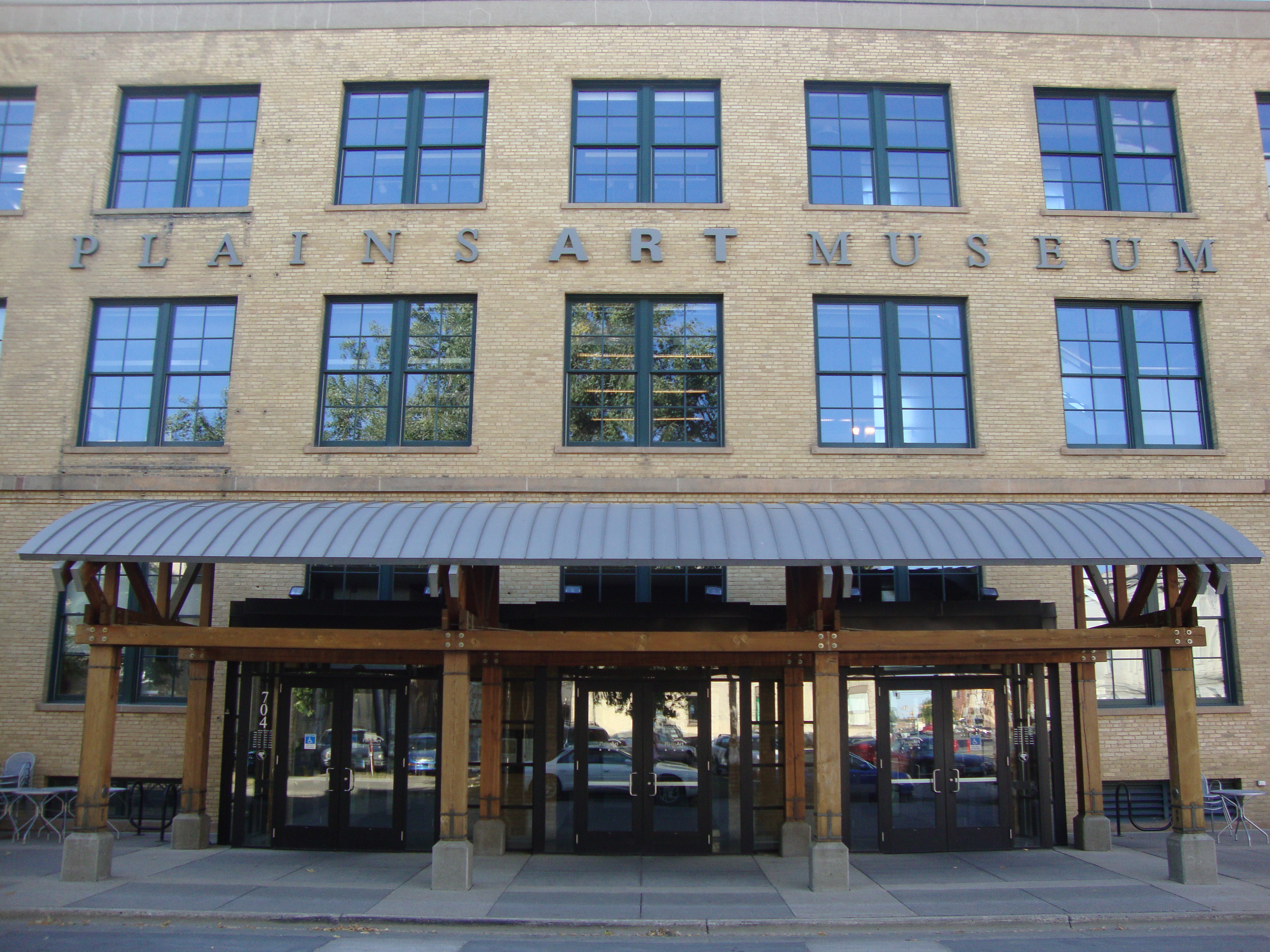
- Main entrance to the Plains Art Museum.
- Location: 704 1st Ave N Fargo, ND 58102

The Plains Art Museum is a fine arts museum located in downtown Fargo, North Dakota, United States.

== History ==
The history of the museum dates back to 1965 when the "Red River Art Center" opened in the former Moorhead, Minnesota, post office. The name of the Red River Art Center was changed after it merged with the O'Rourke Art Gallery Museum to form the "Plains Art Museum" in 1975 while simultaneously operating Rourke Gallery a few blocks away. After a 1987 schism resulting the departure of founding director James O'Rourke, the Plains Art Museum and the Rourke Art Museum became separate institutions. The Plains remained in the downtown Moorhead location until 1996. In October 1997, the Museum relocated to a renovated turn-of-the-century International Harvester warehouse in downtown Fargo, North Dakota., a property the Plains had acquired in 1994. The American Alliance of Museums granted accreditation to Plains Art Museum in 2003. This made the Plains Art Museum one of two museums in North Dakota which has received this distinction.

== Permanent collection ==
The museum's permanent collection contains approximately three thousand works including national and regional contemporary art, traditional American Indian art, and traditional folk art. Artists whose work is represented include Andy Warhol, James Rosenquist, Salvador Dalí, Ellsworth Kelly, Helen Frankenthaler, and Sol LeWitt.

== Collection on Wheels ==
In 1993, the Plains Art Museum began the Rolling Plains Art Gallery, a climate-controlled semi-trailer which traveled to communities in North Dakota and Minnesota. The semi-trailer not only transported the artwork, but also served as the gallery itself. To create a richer experience, an art educator travelled along with the select pieces from the permanent collection. The Rolling Plains Art Gallery is not currently touring.

== Podcasts ==
Joe Williams, director of Native American programs at the Plains Art Museum, hosts the weekly podcast "5 Plain Questions", where he interviews Indigenous artists. The podcast launched in May 2020 and is produced in conjunction with Eleven Warrior Arts.
