= Bush Foundation =

US philanthropic organization

- Formation: 1953
- Headquarters: Saint Paul, Minnesota, United States
- Founder: Archibald Bush
- Revenue: $71,829,464 (2015)
- Expenses: $49,454,796 (2015)
- Website: www.bushfoundation.org

The Bush Foundation is a charitable organization in the United States. It invests in programs in Minnesota, North Dakota, South Dakota and the 23 Native nations within those three states.

They work through open grantmaking programs to support efforts to: develop, test and spread great ideas that will make the region better for everyone; and inspire, equip and connect people to more effectively lead change.

The foundation was founded by Archibald and Edyth Bush in 1953.
