= Mateo Romero =

Mateo Romero may refer to:

- Mateo Romero (artist) (born 1966), Native American painter.
- Mateo Romero (composer) (c.1575–1647), Belgian-born Spanish composer, master of the imperial chapel.
- Mateo Romero (racewalker) (born 2003), Colombian racewalker
