= Joseph Henry Lonas =

American sculptor (1925–2011)

Joseph Henry Lonas (January 4, 1925 – August 3, 2011) was an American sculptor and painter who spent most of his artistic career in Berlin, Germany.

== Life and work ==
Joseph Henry Lonas was born in Manassas, Virginia, in 1925 and began his artistic education at the age of 14 at the Corcoran Gallery of Art in Washington, D.C. Immediately after graduating high school in 1943, Lonas joined the Army and was assigned as a gunner to the 987th Field Artillery Battalion, with which he served in Normandy, the Ardennes, Rhineland, and Central Europe.

After World War II, Lonas earned his Bachelor of Arts from the College of William & Mary in Williamsburg, Virginia, where he studied under renowned sculptor Professor Carl Roseberg. Roseberg recalls Lonas as one of his most talented students and that he had "a natural talent and inclination." Though Lonas had planned to pursue a graduate degree at the University of Iowa, his studies were interrupted by a call to serve in the Korean War. After completing his service, Lonas returned to the University of Iowa and graduated with a master's degree in art history in 1953. Upon his graduation at the University of Iowa, Lonas was awarded a Fulbright Scholarship to study at the University of Fine Arts in Berlin, Germany, where he later became a professor.

Lonas spent the majority of his artistic career in Berlin. At one time he worked at the prestigious art foundry Bildgießerei Hermann Noack in the city. By 1976, Lonas had installed seven outdoor sculptures in Berlin, the largest number by any artist in the city. Large scale public art sculptures by Lonas can still be found in Berlin.

His works were also included in many one-person shows in Berlin, the Hague, Williamsburg, and Backnang from the 1960s through the first decade of the 21st century. For instance, in 2004, Lonas' work was displayed in a solo show at the Solitaire Galerie in Berlin, Germany. From September 15 – October 29, 2004, an exhibition of Lonas' work titled "Sculpture & Innovation" debuted at The Center for the Arts of Greater Manassas and Prince William County.

Smaller-scale sculptures, paintings, and drawings by Lonas are part of the permanent collection of the Muscarelle Museum of Art at the artist's alma mater, the College of William & Mary in Williamsburg, VA. The collection, given by Lonas in 1975, includes working models of outdoor pieces in bronze, photographs, and drawings.

Lonas experimented with innovative ways to make his sculptures changeable by audiences, ultimately developing a lock and plug mechanism he referred to as a mechanical joint consisting of brass cubes with twist locks into which spreader pins could be inserted. Art critic Heinz Ohff notes that Lonas was "concerned actually with the sculptural problem, with the synthesis of spatial description and volume, combining various sculptural ideas. He solves this problem as no one else does with the most modern aids that his time can offer him and over which, in an exemplary way and in every sense of the word, he has total command."

Lonas' work is the subject of the book "Synthese und Neuerung : Skulpturen, Zeichnungen von Joseph Henry Lonas," authored by John Gabriel. Gabriel comments that "Lonas's work reflects independence of mind and a spirit of individualism. He has made a notable contribution to contemporary sculpture."

== Selected Public Art Sculptures ==
- Loads and carrying (1963) Wolfsburg, theater (parking lot)
- Partition (1966) Berlin, Reinickendorf, Montanstraße
- Brunnenplastik (1966–67), Berlin, Zehlendorf, Dreilindenstraße
- Pony (1967), Berlin, Reinickendorf, Taldorfer way
- Polyederwand (1965–67), Berlin, Neukölln, Gropiusstadt, Joachim-Gottschalk-Weg
- Water Sculpture (1967–68), Berlin, Neukölln, Gropiusstadt, Theodor-Loos-Weg
- Memorial to Kurt Schumacher (1968-1970), Berlin, Reinickendorf, Kurt-Schumacher-Platz / corner Scharnweberstraße
- Hanging sculpture (1973-1975), Berlin, Spandau, Blasewitzer Ring / corner Sand Street
- DIN-Portal-Plastik (1977-1978), Berlin, Charlottenburg, Burggrafenstraße
- Sculpture (1980–81), Berlin, Spandau, Am Juliusturm / An der Spreeschanze
- Wasserplastik (1981) Berlin, Kreuzberg, Stallschreiberstraße / corner Moritzplatz
- Ground relief (date unknown) Berlin, Neukölln, Gropiusstadt, Joachim-Gottschalk-Weg
