= Frederic C. Hamilton =

- Born: September 25, 1927; Columbus, Ohio
- Died: September 30, 2016 (aged 89)
- Education: Millbrook School; Lawrenceville School; Babson College
- Occupations: Businessman, oil executive, philanthropist
- Known for: Founder of Hamilton Oil Corporation; philanthropy at the Denver Art Museum

Frederic C. Hamilton (September 25, 1927 – September 30, 2016) was the chairman of the Hamilton Companies, a loosely connected group of companies focused on oil production, real estate holdings and educational institutions.

Frederic C. Hamilton founded Hamilton Oil Corporation in the late 1960s. He built it into an international oil company as well as a domestic gas company, both of which he merged into a major integrated oil company in the mid-1980s. At the time of his death Hamilton was the Chairman of The Hamilton Companies, which is active in venture capital, private equity, oil and gas, real estate, mortgage lending, securities and acquisitions operations.

Fred Hamilton was inducted into the Colorado Business Hall of Fame by Junior Achievement-Rocky Mountain and the Denver Metro Chamber of Commerce in 2010.

== Early life ==
Hamilton was born in Columbus, Ohio, but spent much of his childhood in Springfield, Illinois. He was educated at Millbrook and Lawrenceville schools and Babson College. He also served in the United States Air Force. Hamilton began his career as a roughneck and roustabout in the oil fields of Texas.

== Oil exploration ==
Hamilton has been referred to as having been one of the United States’s oil pioneers. In 1950, he started Hamilton Brothers Drilling Company along with his brother Ferris, in Dallas, Texas, with a $5,000 loan from their mother. Their success enabled them to expand into oil and gas exploration with a partnership known as Hamilton Brothers. In 1962, this became Hamilton Brothers Oil Company and the company moved to Denver. Hamilton's family have resided in Denver for more than 50 years.

In the early '70s, Hamilton Brothers was the first company to find and produce oil in the North Sea. They drilled the first well in the East China Sea and later the first in the Barents Sea, offshore Russia. They also developed and used the first floating production system in the world.

== Philanthropy ==
Hamilton served as the Chairman Emeritus of the Denver Art Museum (DAM) Board of Trustees. He served as the DAM's Vice Chairman beginning in 1984, became Chairman of the Board of Trustees in 1994 and acted as Co-Chairman with J. Landis (Lanny) Martin from July 2011 to January 2013. He guided the museum through several major milestones, most notably the planning, financing and construction of the Frederic C. Hamilton Building, designed by Daniel Libeskind. It first opened to the public in October 2006. Additionally, Hamilton led two major endowment campaigns for the DAM during his tenure, growing those assets to more than $100 million. He also helped lead the fundraising effort to complete the $110 million expansion project. In recognition of his long-time support, the museum named its 146,000-square-foot expansion, the Frederic C. Hamilton Building. Hamilton was a member of the Trustees Council of the National Gallery of Art, an alumni member of the Smithsonian Institution Board of Directors, on the Board of Trustees of the Denver Area Council Boy Scouts of America and President of the Graland Country Day School Foundation Board.

He established endowed chairs in endocrinology, macular degeneration and skin cancer research at the University of Colorado School of Medicine and created endowments at NewYork–Presbyterian Hospital/Weill Cornell Medical College for research and for clinical scholars.

Hamilton was a lifetime trustee at Graland Country Day School where several buildings bear his name, including the Frederic C. Hamilton Gymnasium and classroom buildings named Hamilton West and Hamilton East. With Scott Reiman, he also funded a large portion of the Hamilton-Reiman Building which houses Graland's library and performing arts theater.

Hamilton's past corporate directorships include: Chairman, Tejas Gas Corporation; Director, BHP; Celanese Corporation; First National Bancorporation; Gates Learjet; IntraWest Financial Corporation; ITT Corporation; International Mining Corporation; United States Tmst Co.; Norwest Corporation; Permian Corporation; Skandinaviska Enskilda Banken International Corporation; United Banks of Colorado and Volvo International Board.

== Notable endowments ==
- 2003 Frederic C Hamilton Building at the Denver Art Museum
- Endocrinology Chair at the University of Colorado School of Medicine.
- Newman Center, University of Denver.
- Ritchie Center, University of Denver.
- American Federation of Arts
- Denver Children's Hospital
