= Cara Romero =

Chemehuevi photographer from the United States

Cara Romero (born 1977) is an American photographer known for her digital photography that examines Indigenous life through a contemporary lens. She lives in both Santa Fe, New Mexico and the Mojave Desert. She is an enrolled citizen of the Chemehuevi Indian Tribe.

== Biography ==
Cara Romero was born in Inglewood, California. and was raised on the Chemehuevi Indian Tribe of the Chemehuevi Reservation. Her father is Chemehuevi, and her mother is German-Irish. Romero majored in Cultural Anthropology at the University of Houston. She later studied photography at the Institute of American Indian Arts and commercial photography at Oklahoma State University. Romero is married to Cochiti Pueblo artist, Diego Romero, and the couple have two sons.

Romero was the first executive director of the Chemehuevi Cultural Centre. In 2007–2010, she was an elected member of the Chemehuevi Tribal Council, she became the Chairman of the Chemehuevi Education Board, and the Chairman of the Chemehuevi Early Education Policy Council.

== Life ==
Growing up as a child of divorce, Romero found herself living a "very bicultural, biracial experience" as she would go back and forth from living in the Chemehuevi Reservation to then a "majority-minority school district" in Houston, Texas. During her time living in Houston, Romero came to the realization that the people around her did not truly understood what it meant to be Native American in America.

Romero studied Cultural Anthropology at the University of Houston in the mid-1990s. She took two elective courses that then changed her mind on Cultural Anthropology and switch to Photography. One being a Native American course where she described it as being "taught as bygone, or in historic contexts," she says. "I realized that most people didn't have a really good grasp of contemporary Native peoples." Her next class was a black and white photography class where they focused on the content of the picture rather than if she could take good photos. This sparked her interest in photography, "I just knew that it's what I wanted to pursue". With this interest in photography it then brought her to the Institute of American Indian Arts in 1999. She then went on to study at Oklahoma State University where she focused on digital photography. She combined what she learned at each of these institutions and created her work that we see today.

== Work ==
Romero was influenced by the photography of Edward Curtis early in her career. Later, she felt that her initial approach was not genuine to her own experience and began to experiment with different techniques and settings for her photographs. She began to use digital tools, such as Photoshop, to combine her photographs and also to use more color photography. Romero's contemporary work includes a large amount of staging to create a sense of theater and expresses a diverse picture of Native American identities. The Santa Fe New Mexican describes her work as a "sometimes whimsical, often complex examination of modern culture with a distinctly modern Indigenous worldview." The Hyperallergic also describes how her photography is "non-realist photography" and "prioritizes storytelling and imagination."

Water Memory is part of a triptych called Water Memories. Romero captured Water Memory in 2015. Cara Romero describes her photo Water Memory by saying, "Visually, the photograph was strong, because it could be so many things" "It draws out that universal thread of the Great Flood. But I'm also from a tribe that was flooded out of ancestral lands—the Army Corps of Engineers actually forcefully dragged people out of their homes to create Lake Havasu. The oral histories tell of how there were already inches of water in people's homes before they were made to leave. Now Lake Havasu feels haunted—there are homes and floodplains below—and when I submerge myself there, I feel all that water memory." She also explains that Water Memory was such a turning point in her photography career by saying "It brought outcomes I never imagined possible, like the Smithsonian collecting my work." "After that, my art became an examination of things that were important to me—things that scared me but that I knew to be true. I started working with female figures. I wanted to break through the exploitative white-male lens that had dominated Native American photography for over a hundred years." Cara Romero's photograph Water Memory is printed with archival pigment print and the whole Water Memories series is also printed in archival pigment print.

The Bristol Post quoted her series, Water Memories, as "breathtaking," and that it "exposes the fragile and essential relationships that exist between people, water and life." Water Memories was shown in 2016 at the exhibition, "STILL," held at the Rainmaker Gallery in Bristol. Romero's work, shown at "CAPTURED" (2015) at the gallery contained both "intimate portraits and playful reconstructions of iconic masterworks." Romero's powerful female portraits were featured prominently in a spring 2017 exhibition 'We Are Native Women' at Rainmaker Gallery, celebrating the strength and diversity of Native American women on the 400th anniversary of the death of Pocahontas. Her work was also presented at a conference 'Pocahontas and After' at the British Library, London in March 2017.

In the 2017 show, "Broken Boxes," held at form & concept gallery in Santa Fe, Romero's photograph, TV Indians, was described by the Albuquerque Journal as her "highest production project yet." The photo juxtaposes Puebloans with media depictions of Native Americans. Romero has been awarded a fellowship by the Native Arts and Cultures Foundation in 2017, In October 2018 Romero's photographs were exhibited by Rainmaker Gallery in the international exhibition 'Life Blood' as part of the Bloomsbury Festival and The Native Spirit Film Festival, London. In 2020, Romero was one of ten recipients of the NDN Collective's Radical Imagination Artist Grants to install billboards and public displays of her photographs in the Los Angeles area. Romero has also won several awards including ribbons at major art markets.

Romero has also been featured at the Four Winds Gallery in Pittsburgh, the Robert Nichols Gallery in Santa Fe, and the Desert X outdoor exhibit in Coachella Valley.

In spring and summer 2025, Romero was found to be the single most exhibited living artist in the United States due to the large number of museum shows featuring her work. These included her retrospective “Cara Romero: Panûpünüwügai (Living Light)” at the Hood Museum of Art and the touring show “Cara and Diego Romero: Tales of Futures Past,” organized by the Figge Art Museum.

== Awards ==
- 2026 Creative Capital Award, Visual Arts
- 2024 Heard Museum Guild Indian Fair and Market Best of Class (2-Dimensional Art), First Place (Photography)
- 2023 Santa Fe Indian Market Best of Division (Photography), First Place (Photography: Miscellaneous), Second Place (Photography: Miscellaneous)
- 2022 Museum of Photographic Arts Lou Stoumen Prize in Photography
- 2022 Santa Fe Indian Market Best of Classification (Paintings, Drawings, Graphics and Photography), Institute of American Indian Arts Alumni Award
- 2022 Heard Museum Guild Indian Fair and Market Second Place (Photography), Innovation (Photography), Idyllwild Arts Imagination Award, Judge's Award (Amber-Dawn Bear Robe
- 2021 Heard Museum Guild Indian Fair and Market Second Place (Photography), Honorable Mention (Photography)
- 2020 Las Fotos Project Editorial Reward
- 2020 Heard Museum Guild Indian Fair and Market First Place (Photography), Judge's Award (Fausto Fernandez)
- 2019 Santa Fe Indian Market First Place (Digital Photography), Honorable Mention (Digital Photography), First Place (Digitally altered primary sources and printed)
- 2019 Heard Museum Guild Indian Fair and Market First Place (Photography)
- 2018 Santa Fe Indian Market Best of Class (Paintings, Drawings, Graphics and Photography), Best of Division (Photography), First Place (Color Photography), First Place (Digital Photography)
- 2018 Heard Museum Guild Indian Fair and Market Second Place (Photography)
- 2017 Santa Fe Indian Market Best of Class (Paintings, Drawings, Graphics and Photography), Best of Division (Photography), First Place (Digital Photography), Best of Division (Computer-generated Graphics), First Place (Digitally altered primary sources and printed)
- 2017 Institute of American Indian Arts Distinguished Alumni Award
- 2017 Heard Museum Guild Indian Fair and Market Judge's Award (Karen Kramer)
- 2016 Santa Fe Indian Market First Place (Digital Photography)
- 2016 Heard Museum Guild Indian Fair and Market First Place (Photography)
- 2015 Santa Fe Indian Market First Place (Digital Photography)
- 2015 Heard Museum Guild Indian Fair and Market First Place (Photography)
- 2014 Santa Fe Indian Market Best of Division (Photography), First Place (Black and white or continuous tone)
- 2014 Heard Museum Guild Indian Fair and Market Second Place (Photography)
- 2014 Heard Museum Guild Indian Fair and Market Judge's Award (Lenae Eller)
- 2013 Santa Fe Indian Market Best of Division (Photography), First Place (Digital Photography)
- 2012 Santa Fe Indian Market First Place (Digital Photography)
- 2007 Heard Museum Guild Indian Fair and Market Honorable Mention (Photography)
- 2006 Native American Rights Fund Visions for the Future Best in Show, Second Place

== Public collections ==
- Amon Carter Museum of American Art
- Anchorage Museum
- Arizona State Museum
- Asheville Art Museum
- Autry Museum of the American West
- Birmingham Museum of Art
- Bristol City Museum and Art Gallery
- British Museum
- Center for Creative Photography
- Chapman University
- Coe Center (Ralph T. Coe Foundation)
- Colby College Museum of Art
- Crocker Art Museum
- Crystal Bridges Museum of American Art
- Danforth Art
- Davis Museum at Wellesley College
- Denver Art Museum
- Des Moines Art Center
- Detroit Institute of Arts
- Flaten Art Museum
- Forge Project (Taghkanic NY)
- Fralin Museum of Art
- Haffenreffer Museum of Anthropology
- Harwood Museum of Art
- Heard Museum
- Hood Museum of Art
- Huntington Library
- § IAIA Museum of Contemporary Native Arts
- Idyllwild Arts Academy
- John W. Bardo Fine and Performing Arts Center
- Library of Congress
- Lilley Museum of Art
- Los Angeles County Museum of Art
- Lucas Museum of Narrative Art
- Marjorie Barrick Museum of Art
- Mary and Leigh Block Museum of Art
- Maryhill Museum of Art
- Mead Art Museum
- Metropolitan Museum of Art
- Milwaukee Art Museum
- Minneapolis Institute of Art
- Minnesota Museum of American Art
- Montclair Art Museum
- Mulvane Art Museum
- Muscarelle Museum of Art
- Museum of Ethnology, Vienna
- Museum of Indian Arts and Culture
- Museum of Modern Art
- Museum of Photographic Arts
- Nasher Museum of Art
- National Gallery of Art
- National Museum of Ethnology (Netherlands)
- National Museum of the American Indian
- Nelson-Atkins Museum of Art
- Nerman Museum of Contemporary Art
- Nevada Museum of Art
- The Newark Museum of Art
- Newberry Library
- New Mexico Museum of Art
- North American Native Museum
- North Dakota Museum of Art
- Ogden Contemporary Arts
- Palm Springs Art Museum
- Peabody Essex Museum
- Philbrook Museum of Art
- Phoenix Art Museum
- Poeh Museum
- Prescott College
- Princeton University Art Museum
- Rhode Island School of Design Museum
- Rockwell Museum
- Ruth and Elmer Wellin Museum of Art
- Saint Louis Art Museum
- § Ruth Chandler Williamson Gallery
- San Bernardino County Museum
- Solomon R. Guggenheim Museum
- Spencer Museum of Art
- Thoma Foundation
- Tia Collection
- Tucson Museum of Art
- Tweed Museum of Art
- UCR/California Museum of Photography
- University of Colorado Denver
- Utah Museum of Fine Arts
- Virginia Museum of Fine Arts
- Weisman Art Museum
- Wereldmuseum Leiden
- Wheelwright Museum of the American Indian
- Whitney Museum
- Williams College Museum of Art
- Yale University Art Gallery
