= Julie Buffalohead =

Indigenous American artist

Julie Buffalohead (born 1974) is a contemporary Indigenous artist from the United States and member of Ponca Tribe of Indians of Oklahoma. Her work mainly focuses on themes of racial injustice, indigenous rights, and abuse of power. She creates paintings with stories told by anthropomorphic animal characters who have agency as individuals. Buffalohead conflates the mythical with the ordinary, the imaginary, and the real, and offers a space into which viewers can bring their own experiences.

== Early life and education ==
Born in Minnesota in 1974, Buffalohead grew up around academia, as both of her parents were college professors. Notably, her father, Roger Buffalohead, was one of the first professors of the American Indian Studies department at the University of Minnesota. With a Native American father and white mother, Buffalohead but she explores her mixed-race identity within her art. In 1995, she received her Bachelor in Fine Arts from the Minneapolis College of Art and Design before going on to get her Master of Fine Arts from Cornell University in 2001. Buffalohead has stated that her time working with elementary school students while in graduate school caused her to change the way she looked at her Native heritage, which led her to create art about Indigenous history. She currently resides in St. Paul, Minnesota.

== Artistic style and influences ==
You are on Indian Land (2017) at the National Gallery of Art in 2023

Buffalohead's art focuses on Indigenous experiences and stories, often subverting imagery of Indigenous people used in popular culture, including Disney's Pocahontas. She often uses metaphors and allegorical images in her work to critique social issues including gun violence. Her work may include whimsical imagery like tea parties and cartoon characters, Buffalohead claims that the work is intended to be unsettling. Buffalohead's work also incorporates the use of anthropomorphic animals, mainly coyotes. Buffalohead is a mixed media artist, and works with many different mediums, including oil painting and printmaking, and includes materials like birch bark and porcupine quills in her pieces.

== Solo exhibitions ==
- 2000 - Offerings From the Heart at Carl N. Gorman Museum in Davis, CA.
- 2003 - Alice P. Rogers Gallery at St. Johns University in Collegeville, MN.
- 2008 - Expecting at the Bockley Gallery in Minneapolis, MN.
- 2010 - Julie Buffalohead at the Bockley Gallery in Minneapolis, MN.
- 2012 - Julie Buffalohead at the Bockley Gallery in Minneapolis, MN.
- 2012 - Julie Buffalohead, Let the Show Begin at the Smithsonian National Museum of the American Indian George Gustave Haye Center in New York, NY.
- 2014 - Julie Buffalohead: Uncommon Stories at the Bockley Gallery in Minneapolis, MN.
- 2014-2015 - Julie Buffalohead: Coyote Dreams at the Minnesota Museum of American Art in St. Paul, MN and the Plains Art Museum in Fargo, ND.
- 2015 - The Truth About Stories: Julie Buffalohead at Institute of American Indian Arts in Santa Fe, NM.
- 2015-2016 - Entwined: New Prints by Julie Buffalohead at Highpoint Center for Printmaking in Minneapolis, MN.
- 2017 - Julie Buffalohead at the Bockley Gallery in Minneapolis, MN.
- 2018 - Julie Buffalohead: You and I at Western Carolina University Fine Art Museum, John W. Bardo Fine and Performing Arts Center in Cullowhee, NC.
- 2018-2019 - Eyes On: Julie Buffalohead at the Denver Art Museum in Denver, CO.
- 2019: Storytelling: Julie Buffalohead, Minneapolis Institute of Art, MN
- 2022: Julie Buffalohead, Perlman Teaching Museum, Carleton College, Northfield, MN
- 2022: Noble Coyotes, Jessica Silverman, San Francisco, CA
- 2023: Decolonize Indigenize, Visions West Contemporary, Denver, CO
- 2024: The Wisdom of Wild Things, Jessica Silverman, San Francisco, CA
- 2025: Travois, Dreamsong, Minneapolis, MN
- 2026: Julie Buffalohead: Stories of Becoming, Nerman Museum of Contemporary Art, Overland Park, KS

== Group exhibitions ==
- 2019 - Hearts of Our People: Native Women Artists at Minneapolis Institute of Art in Minneapolis, MN.
- 2020 - Indelible Ink: Native Women, Printmaking, Collaboration. University of New Mexico Art Museum in Albuquerque, NM.
- 2021 - Shared Ideologies at the Muscarelle Museum of Art in Williamsburg, VA.
- 2023 - A Growing Season at Jessica Silverman Gallery, San Francisco, CA.
- 2023 - Un/Natural Selections: Wildlife in Contemporary Art at The Gibbes Museum of Art, Charleston, SC.
- 2024 - Vivarium: Exploring Intersections of Art, Storytelling, and the Resilience of the Living World at the Albuquerque Museum, NM.
- 2024 - Menagerie: Animals in Art from the Wellin Museum at the Wellin Museum of Art, Clinton, NY.
- 2025 - A Living Collection: 1950 - 2025 at the Tweed Museum of Art, Duluth, MN.
- 2025 - Shifting the Narrative: 21st Century Acquisitions at the Portland Art Museum, OR.
- 2025 - Indigenous Identities: Here, Now & Always at the Zimmerli Art Museum, New Brunswick, NJ.
- 2026 - Voices Now: Contemporary Native American Art at the Museum of Kansas City, MO

== Honors and awards ==
Buffalohead has been the recipient of several awards, including the McKnight Foundation Fellowship for Visual Arts, a Jerome Foundation Travel and Study Grant, and the Minnesota State Arts Board for Visual Artists.

== Collections ==
Her work is included in the collection of the National Museum of the American Indian, Walker Art Museum and the Muscarelle Museum of Art.
