= Scott Reiman =

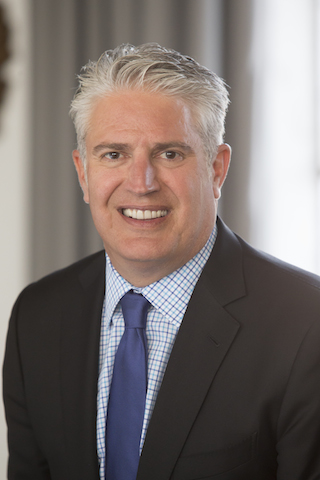
Scott Reiman is a Denver-based investor.

Scott Reiman is a Denver-based businessman who is president of the Reiman Foundation and founder and president of Hexagon, Inc., a private investment company, and has served as President since 1992. Hexagon engages in marketable securities, real estate, private equity funds and venture capital, and oil and gas.

== Civic Involvement ==
Scott Reiman manages the Reiman Foundation, which was founded in 1986. The primary focus of the foundation's philanthropic work is in the areas of education, healthcare, children's initiatives and the arts.

Reiman and his wife Virginia support the Denver Art Museum. They are namesake sponsors of the Reiman Bridge that spans 13th Street between the Hamilton Building and the Ponti Building.

In March 2015, the Denver Art Museum announced the Free for Kids Program. Through Reiman's support, the program provides free Denver Art Museum general admission for all youth visitors, ages 0 – 18. As part of the program, the maximum entry fee for ticketed exhibitions is capped for youth. The free admission program is also supported by Kaiser Permanente to help the museum reach underserved communities and lower the financial barriers for family visits.

== Awards and Endowments ==
• 2000 Ammi Hyde Award for Young Alumni Achievement

• Downtown Denver Partnership 38th Annual Award

• The Reiman Bridge at the Denver Art Museum

• Reiman School of Finance and University of Denver

• Reiman Theater at University of Denver’s Margery Reed Hall

• Reiman Hamilton Building at Graland Country Day School

• Scott J. Reiman Browsing Area at the Denver Public Library

• Sadie Reiman Wing at Colorado State University’s College of Veterinary Medicine & Biomedical Sciences

== Business Ventures ==
Reiman founded Hexagon in 1992 and serves as the company's president. Hexagon has offices in Denver, Colorado, and Milwaukee, Wisconsin. Energy exploration, direct investments, private equity placements and real estate development are the primary asset classes of the Denver-based firm. Hexagon has helped fund the development of a number of projects across the U.S., including Denver’s Larimer Square and Palace Lofts, and Milwaukee’s 1522 on the Lake.

In 1998, Reiman and Hexagon were presented with the Downtown Denver Partnership’s 38th Annual Award for their contributions to the redevelopment of Larimer Square and lower downtown Denver.

Reiman is a founding sponsor of the Quarterly Forum, a Denver-based business leadership and professional development organization.

== Board Positions ==
Reiman serves on the boards for the ACE Scholarships and the Denver Art Museum, the Rocky Mountain Public Broadcasting Network and Graland Country Day School. Reiman has served on the Board of Trustees at the University of Denver since 1999. Reiman stepped down from the University's Investment committee in 2013, after the university conducted an independent investigation that found he violated no standards of legal or ethical conduct regarding his 2013 settlement with the Securities and Exchange Commission. No charges were filed against Reiman as part of the investigation. A separate jury case focused on others later found no evidence of wrongdoing and that the SEC had not proved any part of its accusations against Reiman.

Reiman is a former board member of the Denver Dumb Friends League, the American Transplant Foundation and the Denver Center for Performing Arts.

== Education and Personal ==
Reiman graduated from the Daniels College of Business at the University of Denver in 1987 with a Bachelor of Science in Business Administration in Finance. In 2000, he received the University of Denver's Ammi Hyde Award for Young Alumni Achievement. Born in Milwaukee, Wisconsin, Reiman lives in Denver with his wife and their two sons, Devin and Chase.
