= Diego Romero (artist) =

Cochiti Pueblo artist from New Mexico

- Born: 1964 (age 61–62); Berkeley, California, U.S.
- Citizenship: Cochiti Pueblo and U.S.
- Education: (MFA) University of California, Los Angeles, (BFA) Otis College of Art and Design, Institute of American Indian Arts
- Known for: ceramics, printmaking, painting
- Movement: Pueblo art, Indigenous futurisms
- Spouse: Cara Romero

External images
- Diego Romero portrait
- When Titans Collide
- Double Take, Chongo Brothers, 2002

Diego Romero (born 1964) is an American Cochiti Pueblo visual artist. He is known for ceramics and pottery, and lives in New Mexico.

== Background ==
Diego Romero was born in Berkeley, California in 1964. His father is Santiago Romero, a Cochiti Pueblo Indian, and his mother is Nellie Guth, a European-American born and raised in Berkeley. Diego was also raised in Berkeley, California, and spent his childhood summers with his paternal grandparents at the pueblo in Cochiti, New Mexico. Romero's father was a traditional painter, although he had lost a hand from being wounded in the Korean War. In his youth, Diego Romero related to his tribe with difficulty. But, the Cochiti council honored him by granting him the right to occupy his grandfather's property. His brother Mateo Romero is also a notable painter. Romero's wife, Cara Romero, is a noted photographer.

== Art career ==
Raised in Berkeley, California, Diego Romero is a third-generation Cochiti Pueblo artist who specializes in pottery (he also does printmaking). One of his collaborators in pottery was Navajo–Hopi ceramicist Nathan Begaye (1958–2010).

After art school in California, Romero attended the Institute of American Indian Arts (IAIA) in Santa Fe. After one year at IAIA, he enrolled at Otis Parsons School of Design in Los Angeles, where he earned his BFA degree. He studied next at University of California, Los Angeles, where he received his MFA degree in 1993.

Romero's pots marry Cochiti Pueblo ceramics with his love of comic books, superheroes, mythology, and pop culture. He honors his Cochiti worldview and his ancestors' method of coiling clay but expands the tradition with imagery and painting treatments. He is a self-proclaimed "chronologist on the absurdity of human nature." He draws on prehistoric Ancestral Pueblo and Mimbres ceramics, Greek vessels, and pop culture. Romero's narratives combine humor and often-biting social commentary that communicate messages about contemporary Native American life, including difficult issues related to Native politics, history, identity, war, and alcoholism.

In the 1990s, Romero catapulted to notoriety in the American Southwest ceramics world with his "Chongo Brothers" polychromed earthenware series. A chongo is a Southwest Native man who wears his hair in a traditional bun. Some of the characters figured in his work reflect a Greek painting style, and portray idealized, muscular bodies. Romero's work explores gender politics, sexuality, and multifaceted identities of Native people, and all the while, relates the contemporary to the ancient.

A collection of his work toured Europe in 2006. He is represented by galleries in New York and Santa Fe, including Robert Nichols Gallery.

== Notable collections ==
- British Museum, London, England, UK
- Cartier Foundation, Paris, France
- Heard Museum, Phoenix, AZ
- Metropolitan Museum of Art, New York, NY: Dough Bowl, 1994, gift of Ralph T. Coe
- Muscarelle Museum of Art, Williamsburg, VA
- National Museum of the American Indian, Washington, DC: She-Wana's Dream, 2008
- National Museum of Scotland, Edinburgh, Scotland, UK
- New Mexico Museum of Art, Santa Fe, NM
- Peabody Essex Museum, Salem, MA
- Haffenreffer Museum of Anthropology at Brown University, Providence, RI

== See also ==
- List of Native American artists
