= Denver Art Museum =

Art museum in Denver, Colorado, United States

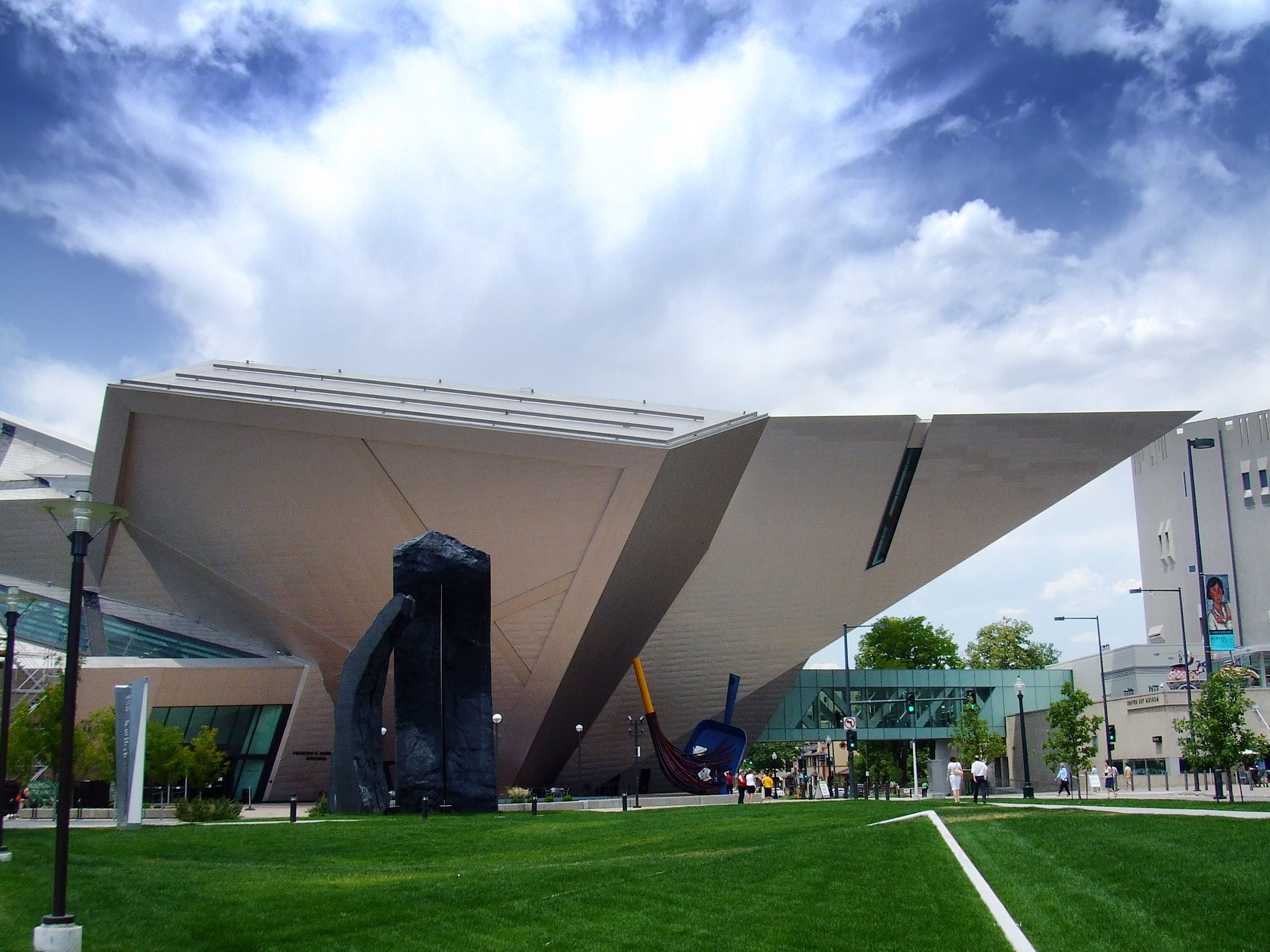
- Frederic C. Hamilton building at DAM
- Interactive fullscreen map
- Location: 100 W 14th Avenue Parkway, Denver, Colorado, U.S.
- Coordinates: 39°44′14″N 104°59′22″W
- Type: Art museum
- Website: denverartmuseum.org

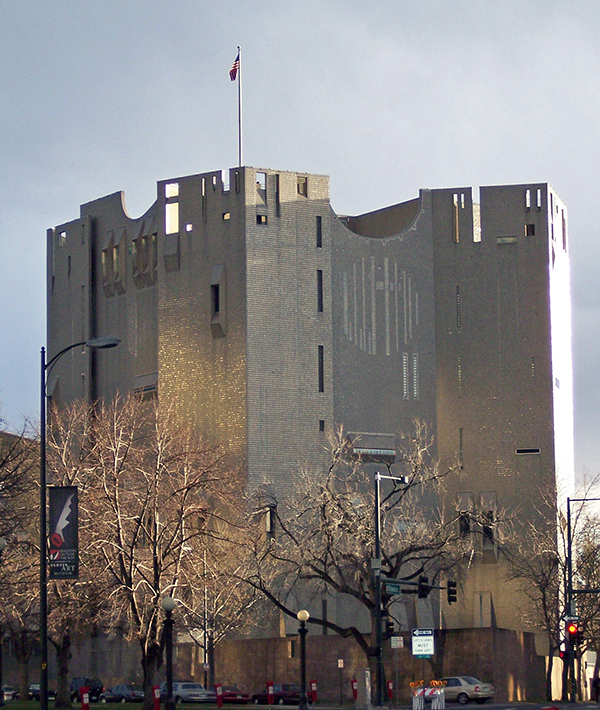
The Martin Building at DAM – designed by Gio Ponti in 1971.

The Denver Art Museum (DAM) is an art museum located in the Civic Center of Denver, Colorado, United States. With an encyclopedic collection of more than 70,000 diverse works from across the centuries and world, the DAM is one of the largest art museums between the West Coast and Chicago. It is known for its collection of American Indian art, as well as The Petrie Institute of Western American Art, which oversees the museum's Western art collection. The museum's Martin Building (formerly known as the North Building) was designed by famed Italian architect Gio Ponti in 1971.

In 2018, the museum began a transformational $150 million renovation project to unify the campus and revitalize Ponti's original structure, including the creation of new exhibition spaces, two new dining options, and a new welcome center.

== History ==
=== 1893–1923 ===
The museum's origins can be traced back to the founding of the Denver Artists Club in 1893. The Club renamed itself the Denver Art Association in 1917 and opened its first galleries in the City and County building two years later. The museum opened galleries in the Chappell House in 1922. The house, located on Logan Street, was donated to the museum by Mrs. George Cranmer and Delos Chappell. In 1923, the Denver Art Association became the Denver Art Museum (DAM).

=== 1948–1974 ===
In 1948, the DAM purchased a building on Acoma and 14th Avenue on the south side of Civic Center Park. Denver architect Burnham Hoyt renovated the building, which opened as the Schleier Memorial Gallery in 1949. While the Schleier Gallery was a significant addition, the DAM still sought to increase its space. Additional pressure came from the Kress Foundation, who offered to donate three collections valued at over $2 million on the condition that DAM construct a new building to house the works. DAM sought help from the city and county of Denver to raise funds. However, in 1952 voters failed to approve a resolution bond. Despite this setback, the museum continued to raise funds and eventually opened a new building, the South Wing (now known as the Bach Wing), in 1954. This made it possible for DAM to receive the three Kress Foundation collections.

The North Building, a seven-story 210,000-square-foot addition, opened in 1971. The building was designed by Italian modernist architect Gio Ponti, with local architects James Sudler Associates of Denver. Ponti said, "Art is a treasure, and these thin but jealous walls defend it." It is his only completed design built in the United States. Ponti designed the DAM building to break from the traditional museum archetypes. The two-towered "castle-like" façade has 24 sides, and more than one million reflective glass tiles, designed by Dow Corning, cover the building's exterior.

The museum is included in the area of the Civic Center Historic District, which was listed on the National Register of Historic Places. The museum building was deemed "non-contributing".

=== 2006–present ===
The Duncan Pavilion and the Frederic C. Hamilton Building were both added to the museum in 2006. The Duncan Pavilion, a 5,700-square-foot second story addition to the Bach Wing, was created to accommodate the bridge traffic from the new Hamilton Building and the existing North Building (1971). Duncan Pavilion was designed to be kid- and family-friendly while also suitable for multi-use, including the museum's Untitled Final Friday series as well as wedding receptions and other events.

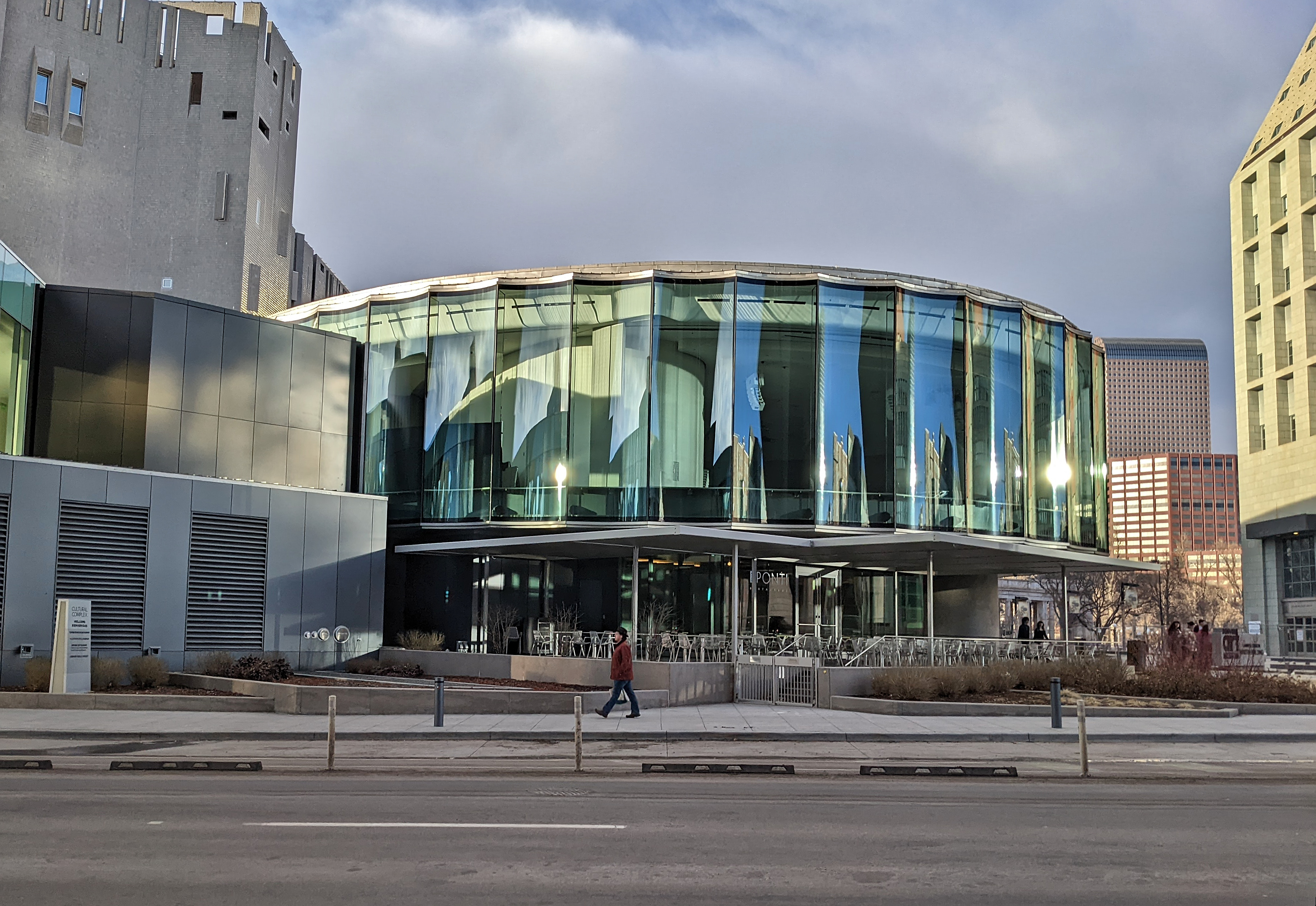
Sie Welcome Center at DAM in 2023

In December 2016, the Denver Art Museum announced a transformational $150 million project to unify the museum's campus and revitalize Ponti's building (now called the Martin Building), including the creation of new gallery spaces, two new dining options and the new Sie Welcome Center. With architecture and design led by Machado-Silvetti and Denver-based Fentress Architects, the renovation project is slated for completion in 2021 in time for the 50th anniversary of Ponti's original building. The Duncan Pavilion was demolished in 2019.

=== Hamilton Building ===
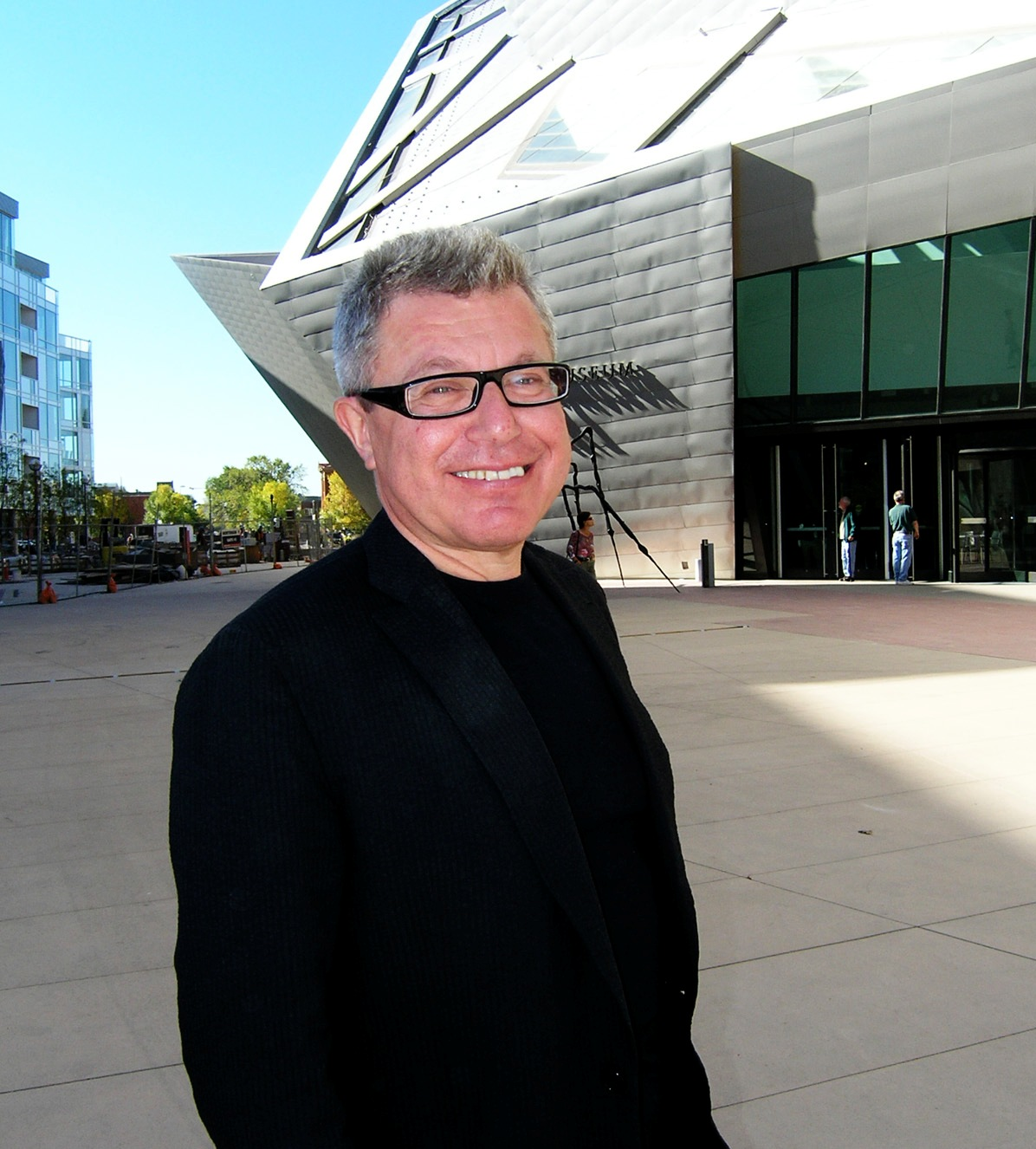
Architect Daniel Libeskind, architect of the Frederic C. Hamilton Building.

The Frederic C. Hamilton Building houses the museum's Modern and Contemporary Art, African Art and Oceanic Art collections, along with part of the Western American art collection and special exhibition spaces. Designed as a joint venture by Studio Daniel Libeskind and Denver firm Davis Partnership Architects (architect of record), the glass and titanium- clad building opened on October 7, 2006. Recognized by the American Institute of Architects as a successful Building Information Modeling project, the Hamilton Building is Libeskind's first completed building in the United States. Recognized for its bold design, the four-story, 146,000 square foot, the Hamilton building serves as the main entrance to the rest of the museum complex. This project doubled the size of the museum, allowing for an expansion of the art on view.

The angular design of the Hamilton building juts in many directions, supported by a 2,740-ton structure that contains more than 3,100 pieces of steel. One of the angled elements extends 167 feet over and 100 feet above the street below. None of the 20 planes is parallel or perpendicular to another.

Similar to the many-peaked roof of the Denver International Airport, the Hamilton Building emulates the sharp angles of the nearby Rocky Mountains, as well as the geometric crystals found at the mountains' base near Denver. Architect Daniel Libeskind said, "I was inspired by the light and geology of the Rockies, but most of all by the wide-open faces of the people of Denver."

Context

Regarding the design concept, Libeskind commented, "The project is not designed as a standalone building but as part of a composition of public spaces, monuments and gateways in this developing part of the city, contributing to the synergy amongst neighbors large and intimate."

Libeskind designed a landscaped pedestrian plaza for the DAM complex. Sculptures on display include 'Scottish Angus Cow and Calf' by Dan Ostermiller, 'Big Sweep' by Coosje van Bruggen and Claes Oldenburg, and 'Denver Monoliths' by Beverly Pepper.

Awards

Due to the distinct configuration of the steel to produce the building, the Hamilton Building expansion of the DAM received a Presidential Award of Excellence from the American Institute of Steel Construction—AISC’s 2007 Innovative Design in Engineering and Architecture with Structural Steel (IDEAS^{2}) Awards competition.

Architectural reviews

The design of the Hamilton extension of DAM has received mixed reviews. Christopher Hawthorne, architecture critic for the Los Angeles Times, said the architectural achievement of the building does not mean it works well as a museum. He called the Hamilton Building "a stunning piece of architectural sculpture," but "a pretty terrible place for showing and looking at art." "Museum architecture does not always blend cohesively with a great architectural achievement."

Lewis Sharp (DAM director, 1989–2009) said one of the most thrilling things about the Hamilton Building is that visitors can see the artworks in a new environment, as there are at least 20 different ways to display and hang artists’ work in the sloping and angular galleries. "I think you often see things that you had never seen before," Sharp said. "It just raises all types of potentially new ways to engage a visitor."

Some visitors and Denver residents appreciate the design, such as the Andreesons, who said, "We’re in normal looking buildings every single day. It’s just kind of an experience to walk into a room that doesn’t look like rooms that we would normally be in." Sharp said that was exactly what the museum was looking for in their expansion. He said the museum's board was seeking the opportunity to draw people to the city.

=== Martin Building ===
On January 10, 2018, the Denver Art Museum broke ground on a comprehensive renovation of its North Building—the only completed structure in North America designed by Italian architect Gio Ponti. One of the first-ever high rise art museums, the North Building was renamed in 2019 in honor of Lanny and Sharon Martin, who made the lead gift of $25 million to revitalize the building as part of the museum's ongoing campus transformation project. Additionally, the Elevate Denver Bond Program contributed $35.5 million in funding to DAM's project.

The renovation includes updates to all seven floors of galleries, the creation of new learning and engagement spaces, as well as a new restaurant, café, and the Sie Welcome Center. The design includes skylights, which reveal new aspects of his design, and exterior site improvements such as lighting as well as revitalizing the glass tiles on the façade of the building. Machado Silvetti and Denver-based Fentress Architects are the design teams behind the $150 million project slated for reopening timed to the building's 50th anniversary in 2021.

When Ponti's original structure was built in 1971, it was designed to accommodate 100,000 visitors per year. In 2017, the museum estimated an average attendance of 850,000 visitors annually. To accommodate growing audiences, the museum's renovation project will add more than 72,000 square feet (6,689 m2) of new and refurbished gallery and visitor spaces, in addition to the implementation of crucial safety and infrastructure upgrades.

=== Sie Welcome Center ===
As part of the Denver Art Museum's major transformation project, the new Sie Welcome Center was constructed to create a new visitor-friendly entrance to the Martin Building and as a connector to the Hamilton Building. Named in honor of Anna and John J. Sie who pledged $12 million in support of the project, the round, glass-clad structure designed by Machado Silvetti and Fentress Architects will serve as the Martin Building's new visitor entrance and ticketing center.

When the Sie Welcome Center opens, it will be home to The Ponti, a restaurant focused on local ingredients led by chef Jennifer Jasinski, as well as a more casual café for lighter fare. On the second floor of the Sie Welcome Center is the Sturm Grand Pavilion, one of downtown Denver's largest and most distinctive event spaces. Over 10,000 square feet, the pavilion's curved, glass panels offer a view of the city.

The Sturm Grand Pavilion is a special event space on the second floor of the Sie Welcome Center. It is over 10,000 square feet and has curved glass panels overlooking the city.

Bonfils-Stanton Foundation Galleries

As part of the Martin Building renovation, the new Bonfils-Stanton Foundation Galleries will present 7,000 square feet (650 m2) of new gallery space for the museum's permanent collection. Reclaiming square footage previously used for art storage, this completely renovated space on level one of the Martin Building will be dedicated to temporary exhibitions pulled from the museum's extensive global art collections.

New Design Galleries

As part of the renovation of the museum's Martin Building (formerly known as the North Building), Machado Silvetti and Fentress Architects horizontally bisected the Martin Building's original Bonfils-Stanton Gallery on level one to create 10,000 square feet (929 m2) of new gallery space on the second level within the original footprint of the building: the Joanne Posner-Mayer Mezzanine Gallery, the Amanda J. Precourt Design Galleries, and the Ellen Bruss Design Studio. To realize the interior design of these new exhibition spaces, the museum partnered with New York-based design firm OMA, who collaborated with the museum previously for the 2018 blockbuster exhibition Dior: From Paris to the World.

=== Duncan Pavilion ===
The Duncan Pavilion was a second story addition to the Bach Wing of the Denver Art Museum and opened in February 2006. The pavilion was demolished in 2017, and the site is now the location of the Sie Welcome Center, part of the museum's transformational renovation project. The Duncan Pavilion served as a link between the Daniel Libeskind-designed Hamilton Building and the 1971 Gio Ponti-designed North Building. The project's intent included preserving the integrity of the oldest part of the museum, the Bach Wing built in 1954, while providing a significant mechanical upgrade for it.

The Duncan Pavilion's open assembly area received the pedestrian bridge from the Hamilton Building with a pedestrian elevator and glass staircase linking pedestrian traffic to the Signature Gallery on the first floor. An upgraded extension of the existing freight elevator created the final link in the system facilitating artwork traffic between buildings so that artwork could be received and serviced in the Hamilton Building and transported to and from the Ponti building's galleries without exiting the protective environment of the museum.

== Collections ==
The Denver Art Museum has nine curatorial departments: African Art; Architecture and Design; Art of the Ancient Americas; Asian Art; Modern and Contemporary; Native Arts (African, American Indian and Oceanic); New World (pre-Columbian and Spanish Colonial); Painting and Sculpture (European and American); Photography; Western Art; and Textile Art and Fashion.

=== African Art ===
The collection of African art is made up of roughly 1,000 pieces, mostly from the 19th and 20th centuries. It includes many rare works in sculpture, textiles, jewelry, painting, printmaking, and drawings. While a majority of their collection focuses on west African works, there are pieces from many regions and mediums, such as wood, metals, fibers, terra cotta, and mixed media compositions.

=== Art of the Ancient Americas ===
The museum's Ancient Americas collection covers over four thousand years of art, including historic works from peoples and communities throughout Mesoamerica, Central and South America, and the Caribbean and Southwestern United States. The department was formed in 1968, and is known for its collection of Central American ceramics, jade, and stone sculpture.

=== Architecture and Design ===
The Denver Art Museum's Architecture, Design and Graphics department was founded in 1990 by former director Lewis I. Sharp. The collection has concentrations in areas including Italian design from the 1960s and 1970s, American graphic design from the 1950s to the present day, post-World War II furniture and product design in America and western Europe and contemporary western European and Japanese design.

=== Asian Art ===
The museum's Asian art collection includes galleries devoted to the arts of India, China, Japan and Southwestern Asia, as well as works from Tibet, Nepal and Southeast Asia. The collection, which originated in 1915 with a donation of Chinese and Japanese art objects, spans a period from the fourth millennium B.C. to the present.

=== European and American Art Before 1900 ===
The Denver Art Museum began receiving significant examples of European from the 1930s with Horace Havemyer's donations of works by Corot, Courbet, and Millet and seven others. From 1932 onwards, funds from the Helen Dill Bequest enabled the museum to acquire works by Claude Monet, Camille Pissarro, Alfred Sisley, Pierre-Auguste Renoir as well as paintings by American artists Thomas Hart Benton, Winslow Homer, John Twachtman, and William Merritt Chase. The Dill bequest comprised thirty-seven works purchased for a sum of $65,650 by 1961.

Artists represented include Claude Monet (Waterlilies), Camille Pissarro (Autumn, Poplars, Éragny), Winslow Homer (Two Figures by the Sea), Gustave Courbet (Valley of the Black Pool), Lucien Lévy-Dhurmer (The Dolomites), Edgar Degas (Examen de Danse), Giovanni Benedetto Castiglione (Deucalion and Pyrrha), Giuseppe Arcimboldo (Summer) and Thomas Cole (Dream of Arcadia).

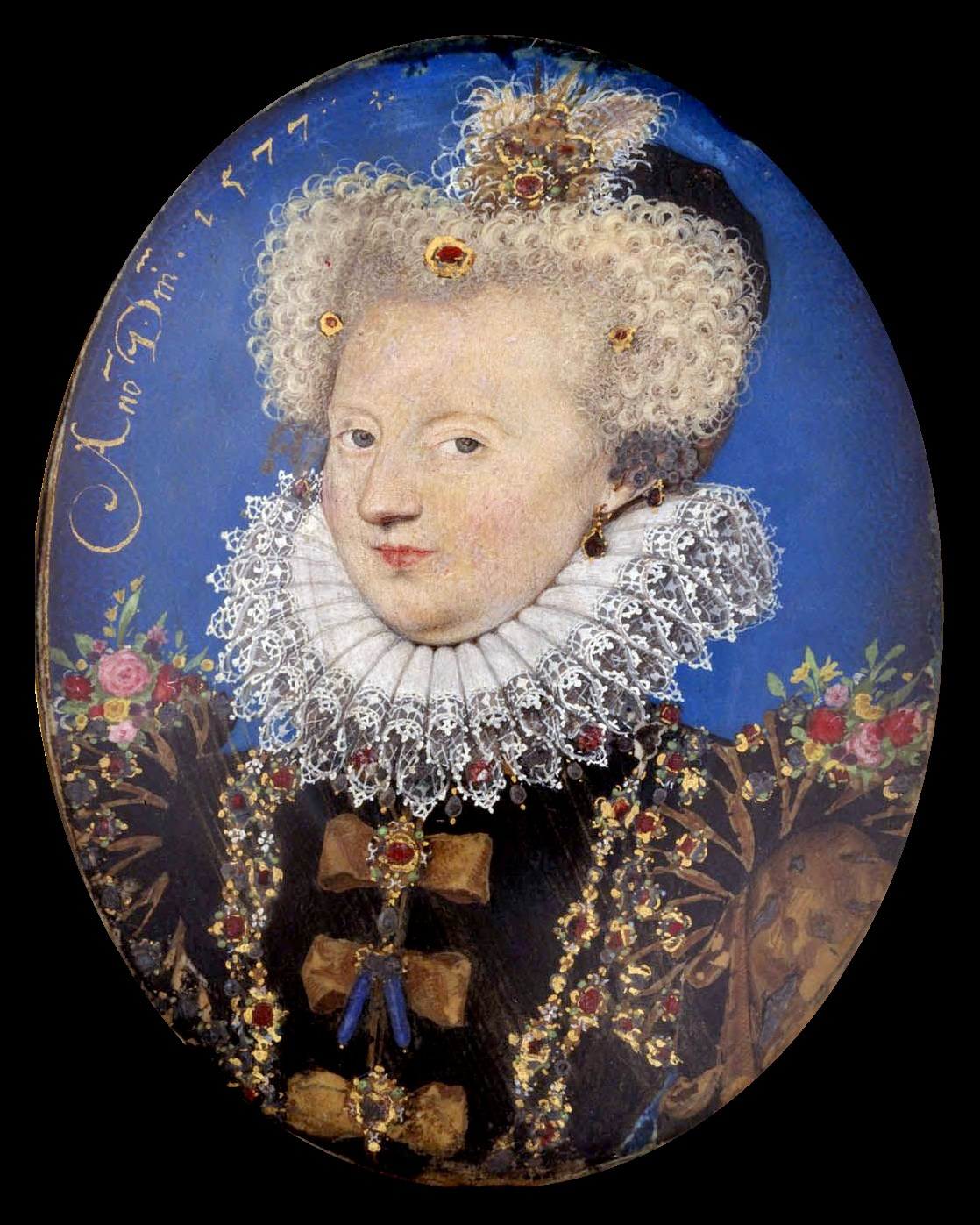
Marguerite of Valois, Queen of Navarre by Nicholas Hilliard, Berger Collection

The Berger Collection

The Berger Collection is a major private collection largely of British art that includes approximately 200 works and spans more than six centuries. Renaissance portraits, including works by Hans Holbein the Younger, are a strength of the collection. Other artists represented include Nicholas Hilliard, Thomas Gainsborough, Angelica Kauffman, Benjamin West, Edward Lear and David Hockney.

==== The Hamilton Collection ====
Frederic C. Hamilton bequeathed 22 Impressionist works from his private collection to the museum in 2014, including Vincent van Gogh's Edge of a Wheat Field With Poppies, fours works by Claude Monet, three paintings by Eugène Boudin and works by Paul Cézanne, Edouard Manet, Berthe Morisot, Camille Pissarro, Auguste Renoir, Alfred Sisley, William Merritt Chase and Childe Hassam.

=== Indigenous Arts of North America ===
Works by contemporary artists such as Jeffrey Gibson, Kent Monkman, D.Y. Begay, Rose B. Simpson, Fritz Scholder, T.C. Cannon, Jaune Quick-to-See Smith, James Luna, Marie Watt, Nicholas Galanin, Virgil Ortiz, Roxanne Swentzell, Nora Naranjo Morse, Julie Buffalohead, Wendy Red Star, Cannupa Hanska Luger, Edgar Heap of Birds, Rick Bartow, Cara Romero, Shan Goshorn, Diego Romero (artist), Harry Fonseca, Kay WalkingStick, Melanie Yazzie, David Bradley (Native American artist), Truman Lowe, Norval Morrisseau, Allan Houser, Will Wilson (photographer), Jim Denomie, Dyani White Hawk, Jamie Okuma, James Lavadour, Gail Tremblay, Preston Singletary, Bently Spang, Richard Zane Smith, and Dan Namingha are included in the collection.

=== Latin American Art ===
In the United States, the Denver Art Museum currently houses the largest collection of art produced in Latin America between the 1600s and the 1800s. It is made up of over 6,000 objects, representing historic works from Mexico, Central and South America, the Caribbean, and the Southwestern United States. Spanish Colonial Period paintings on display include 17th and 18th Century paintings by these painters associated with Mexico: Cristobal Villalpando, Juan Correa, Luis Juarez, Gaspar Munoz de Salazar, Diego Borgraf, and Sebastian Lopez de Arteaga.

=== Modern and Contemporary Art ===
DAM's Modern and Contemporary art collection includes works by artists including Pablo Picasso, Marcel Duchamp, Henri Matisse and Georgia O'Keeffe, as well as 33 paintings, drawings and collages by the acclaimed abstract expressionist Robert Motherwell. The collection also holds representative works from the major post-war art movements, including abstract expressionism, minimalism, pop art, conceptual art and contemporary realism. The department includes the Herbert Bayer Collection and Archive, containing more than 8000 objects.

Herbert Bayer Collection and Archive

The Herbert Bayer Collection and Archive contains over 8,000 works, along with extensive documentary material. This repository is dedicated to the legacy of the Austrian-born Bauhaus master who lived in Colorado for 28 years. The core of this collection and archive came through the artist's bequest, and scholars visit from around the world to engage the collection for research. While the Bayer art works are part of the Denver Art Museum's Modern and Contemporary Art collection, and works not on public view are available for scholarly study by appointment. The archive of non-art materials was transferred to the Denver Public Library in September 2018.

Linda

Linda, by Denver artist John De Andrea, is a life-size realistic sculpture of a sleeping woman. Made of polyvinyl, the piece is sunlight-sensitive and is shown only for short periods of time. People sometimes think it is breathing because of its lifelike appearance.

The Shootout

In 1983 the museum became the home of the controversial pop-art sculpture The Shootout by Red Grooms. It represents a cowboy and an Indian shooting at one another. The sculpture, now on the roof of the museum restaurant, had been evicted from two other downtown Denver locations after Native American activists protested and threatened to deface the work. The sculpture was removed from view in November 2017, and the display space where it had been located was replaced with the Sie Welcome Center, which opened to the public in October 2021.

AS TO BE IN PLAIN SIGHT

One of the most photogenic pieces in the museum, the piece is an aluminum cutout of the words "AS TO BE IN PLAIN SIGHT" made by contemporary artist Lawrence Weiner. The piece is hung on a wall in the museum's third floor, and the view of it is obscured from most points of the museum, ironically hiding it in plain sight. The piece was originally on display outside the museum, but was moved to its current location in 2009.

=== Oceanic Art ===
The Oceanic art collection encompasses about 1,000 objects, with an emphasis on 20th century New Guinea art and 19th century Polynesian art. These collections include works of sculpture, bark cloth, wood carvings, and even some work by contemporary artists.

=== Photography ===
The DAM established a dedicated curatorial department to photography in 2008. The department's collection includes numerous 19th-century works, notably of the American West, as well as holdings of European and American modernist photography. Works by early Western photographers William Bell and Timothy O'Sullivan, 19th-century artists William Henry Fox Talbot and Henry Bosse and modernist photographers such as Gyorgi Kepes and Man Ray are included in the collection.

=== Textile and Fashion ===
The Textile Art and Fashion department of the museum houses over 5,000 pieces from Asia, Europe and North and South America. These pieces form a collection that spans from archaeological textiles to contemporary works of art and fashion from the 18th century to the modern day.

=== Western American Art ===
The institute is organized to support the study, collection, preservation and exhibition of art created about the American West, its people, its history and its landscape. In the Enemy's Country by Charles M. Russell, The Cheyenne by Frederic Remington and Long Jakes, "The Rocky Mountain Man" by Charles Deas are the anchors for the museum's collection. Other highlights include Thomas Moran's Mount of the Holy Cross, Albert Bierstadt's Wind River Country and E. Martin Hennings' Rabbit Hunt.

The Harmsen Collection

In 2001, the Western American Art collection was augmented by a gift of more than 700 art objects from the Bill and Dorothy Harmsen Family; this was the impetus for establishing the institute of western American art at the DAM. The institute received its new title—the Petrie Institute of Western American Art—in 2007, following a gift from the Thomas A. Petrie family to partially endow the department.

==== The Roath Collection ====
In 2013, the museum received a gift of American art from Henry Roath that doubled the importance of its existing western collection. The Roath Collection comprises more than 50 works, ranging in date from 1877 to 1972, by artists such as Albert Bierstadt, Thomas Moran, Frederic Remington and Ernest L. Blumenschein.

== Selected collection highlights ==
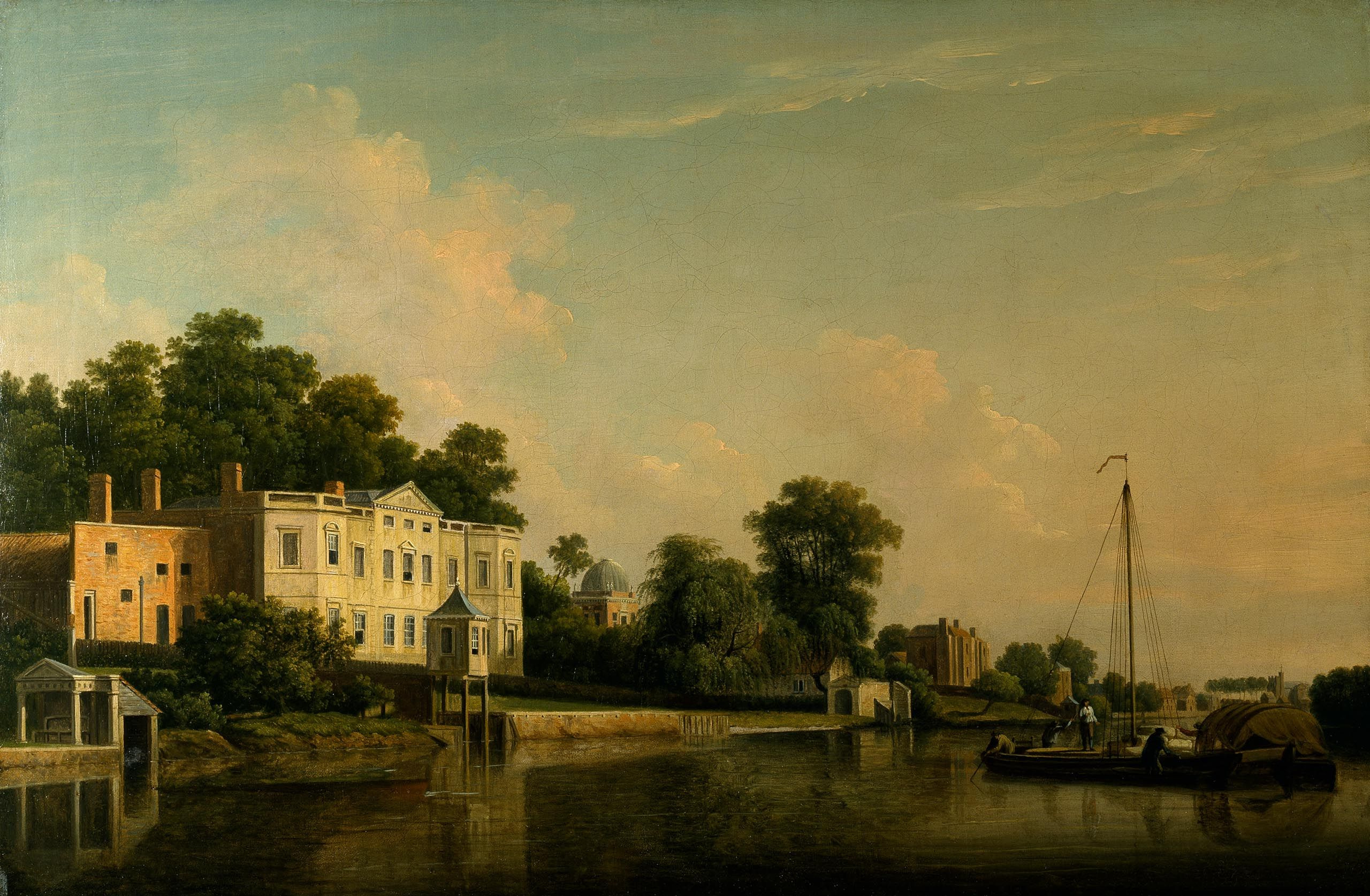
A View of Alexander Pope's Villa, Twickenham by Samuel Scott, 1759

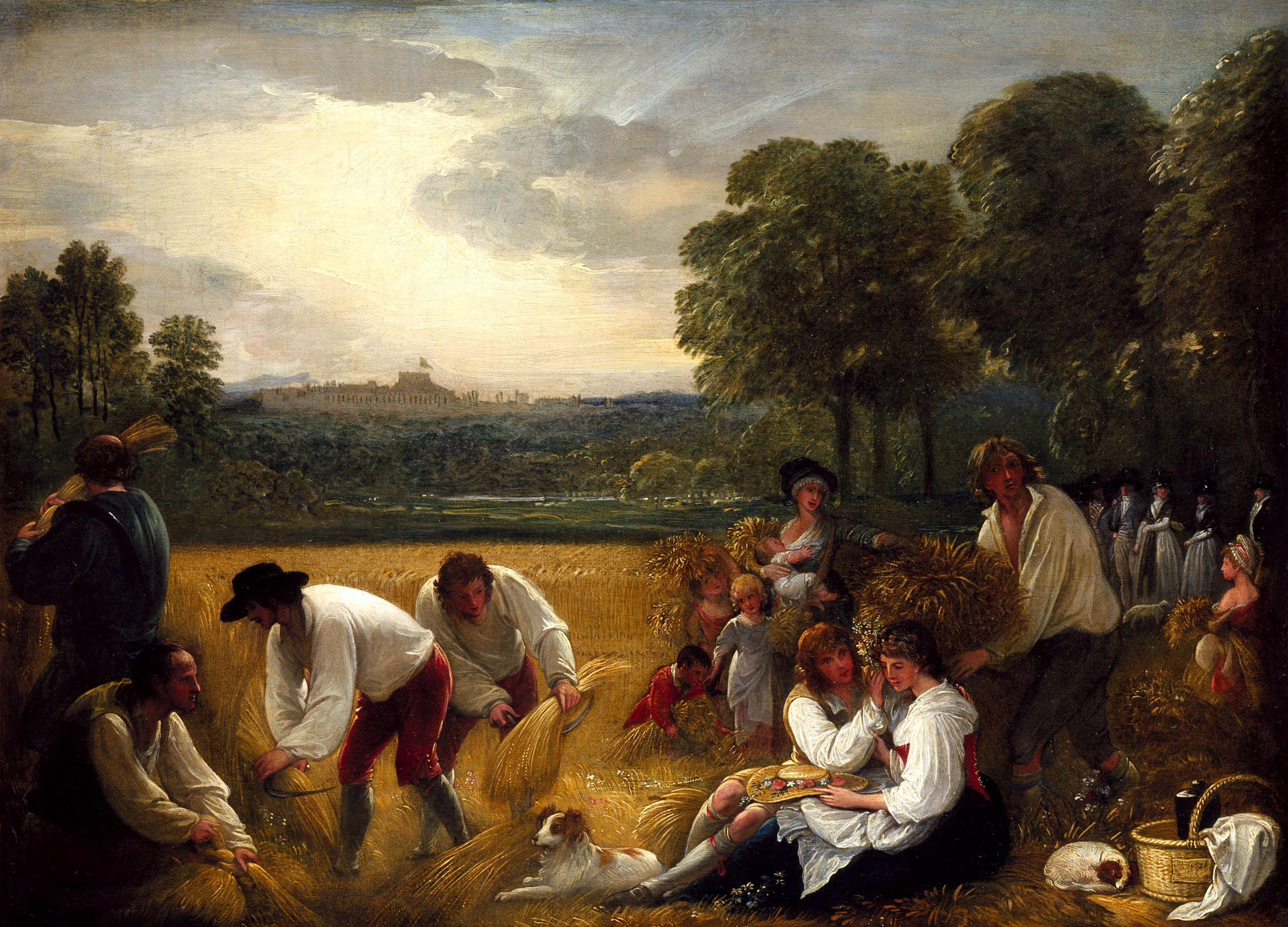
Harvesting at Windsor by Benjamin West, 1795

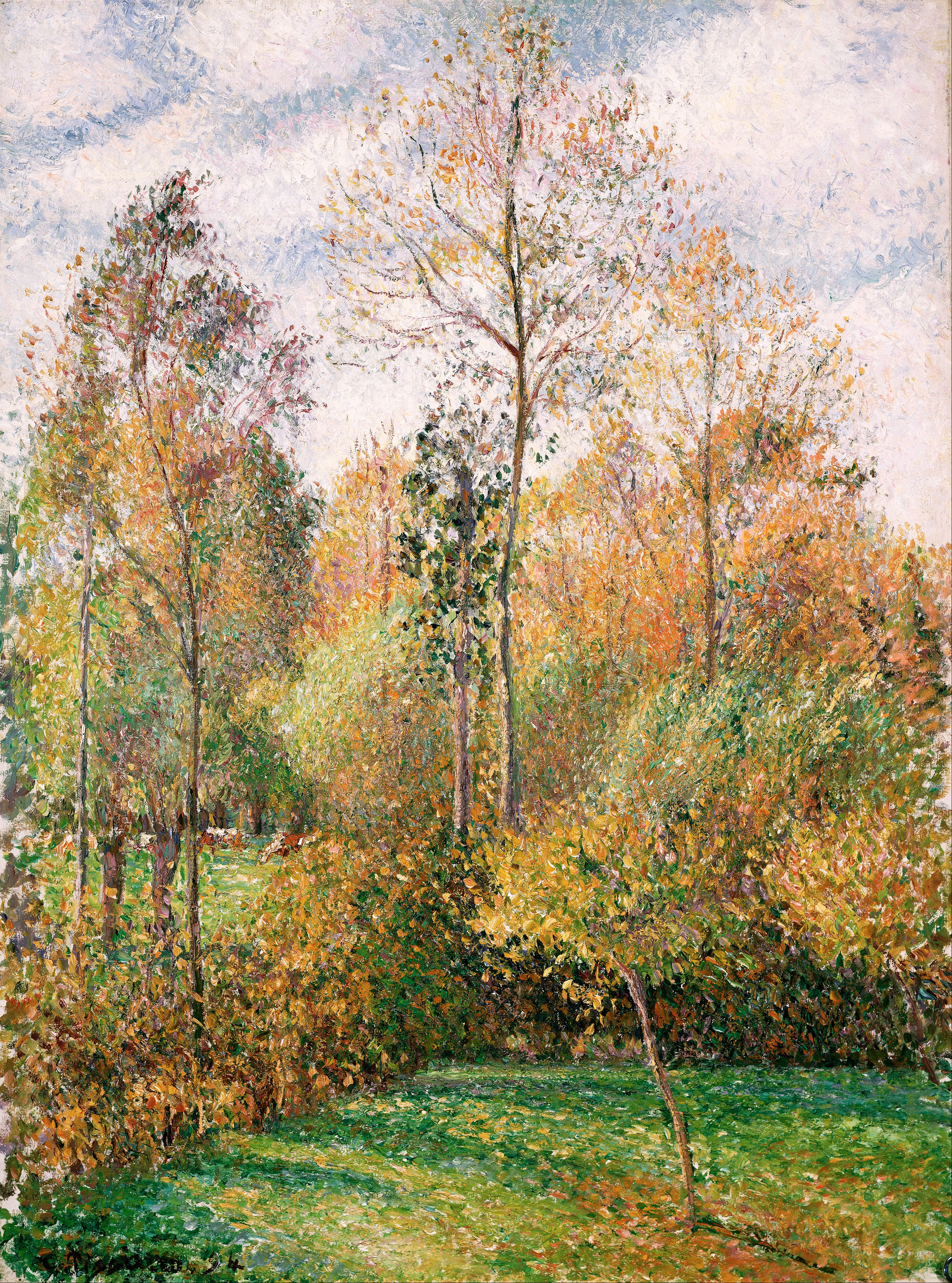
Camille Pissarro

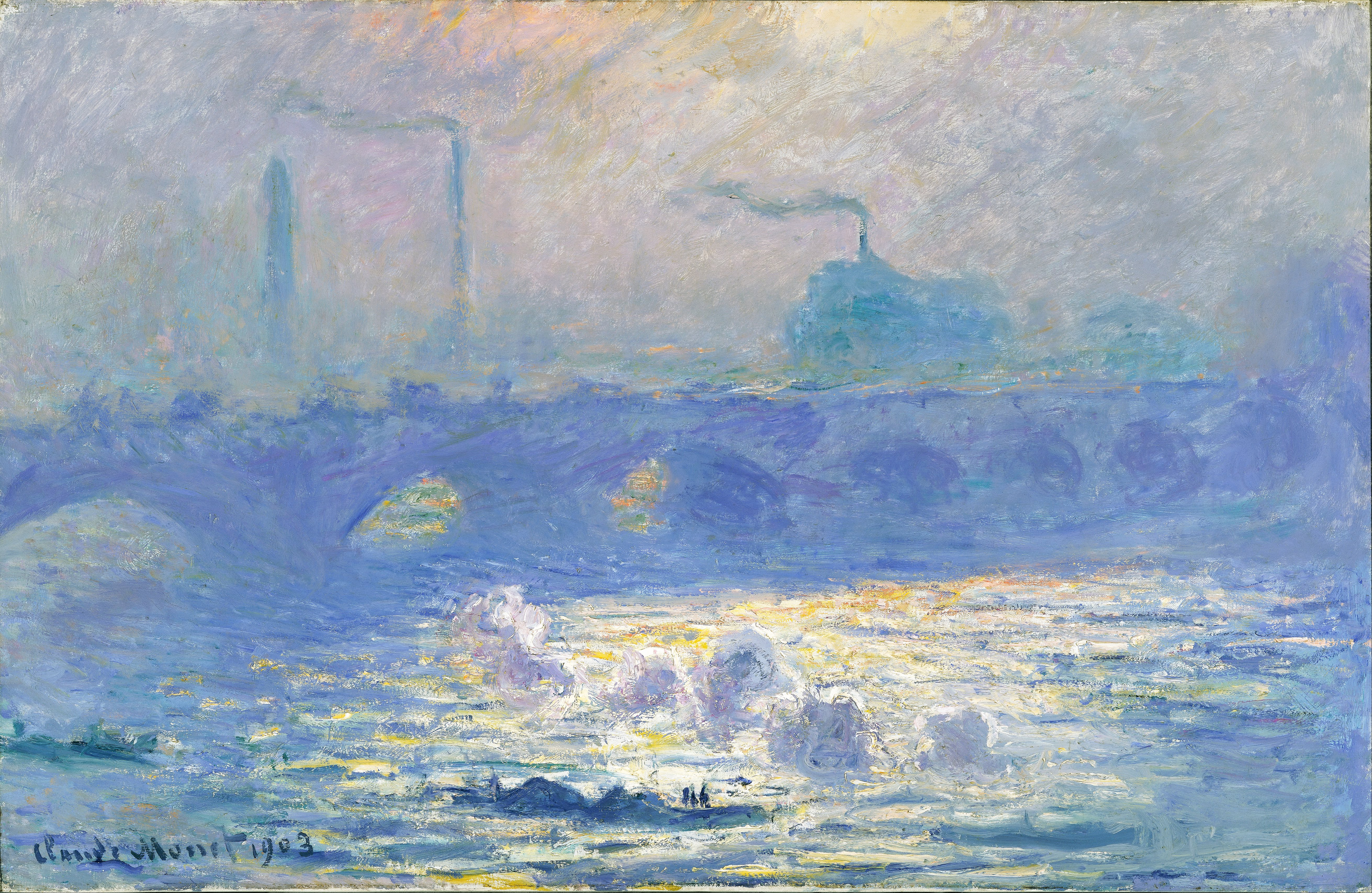
Claude Monet

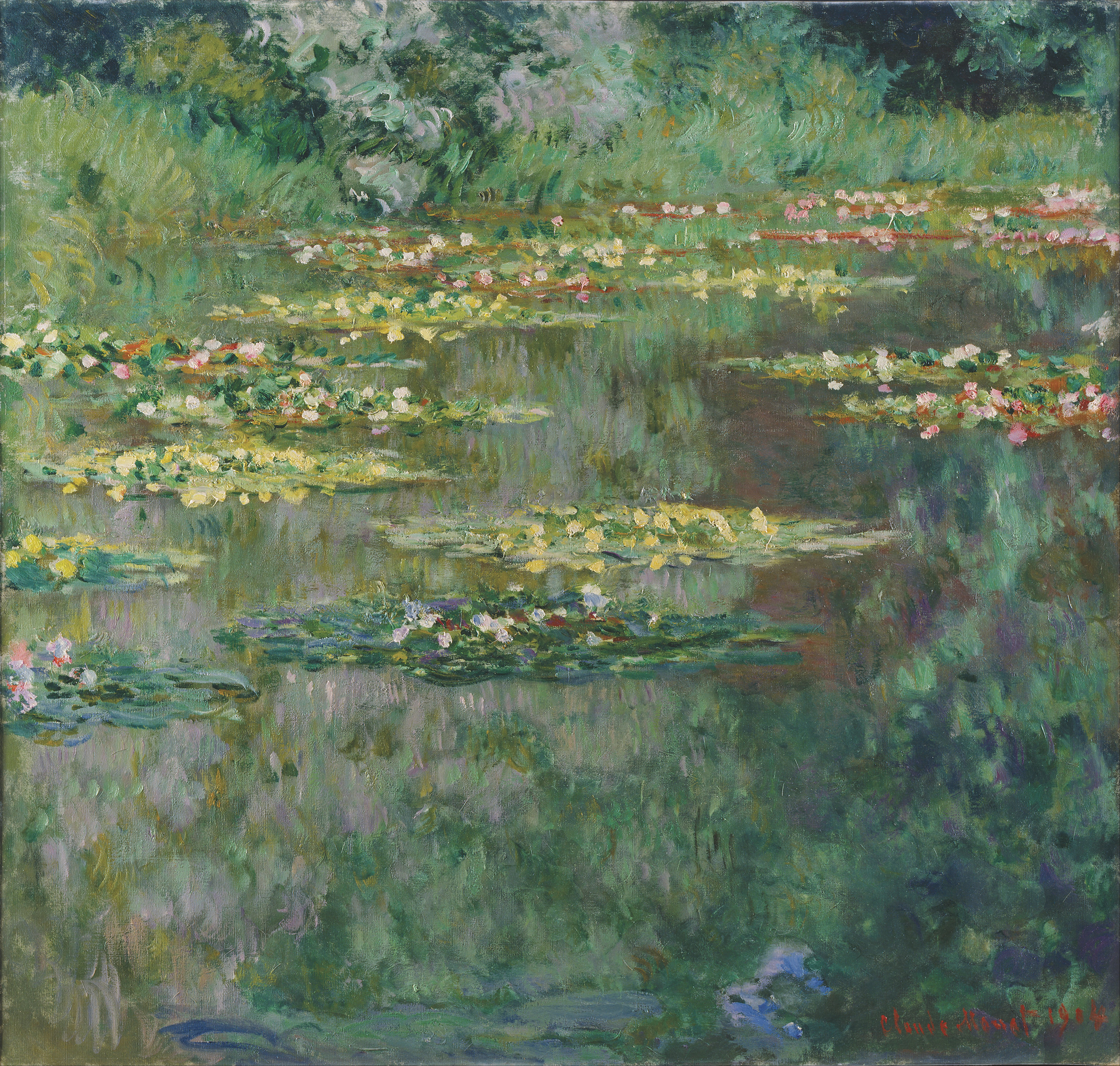
Claude Monet

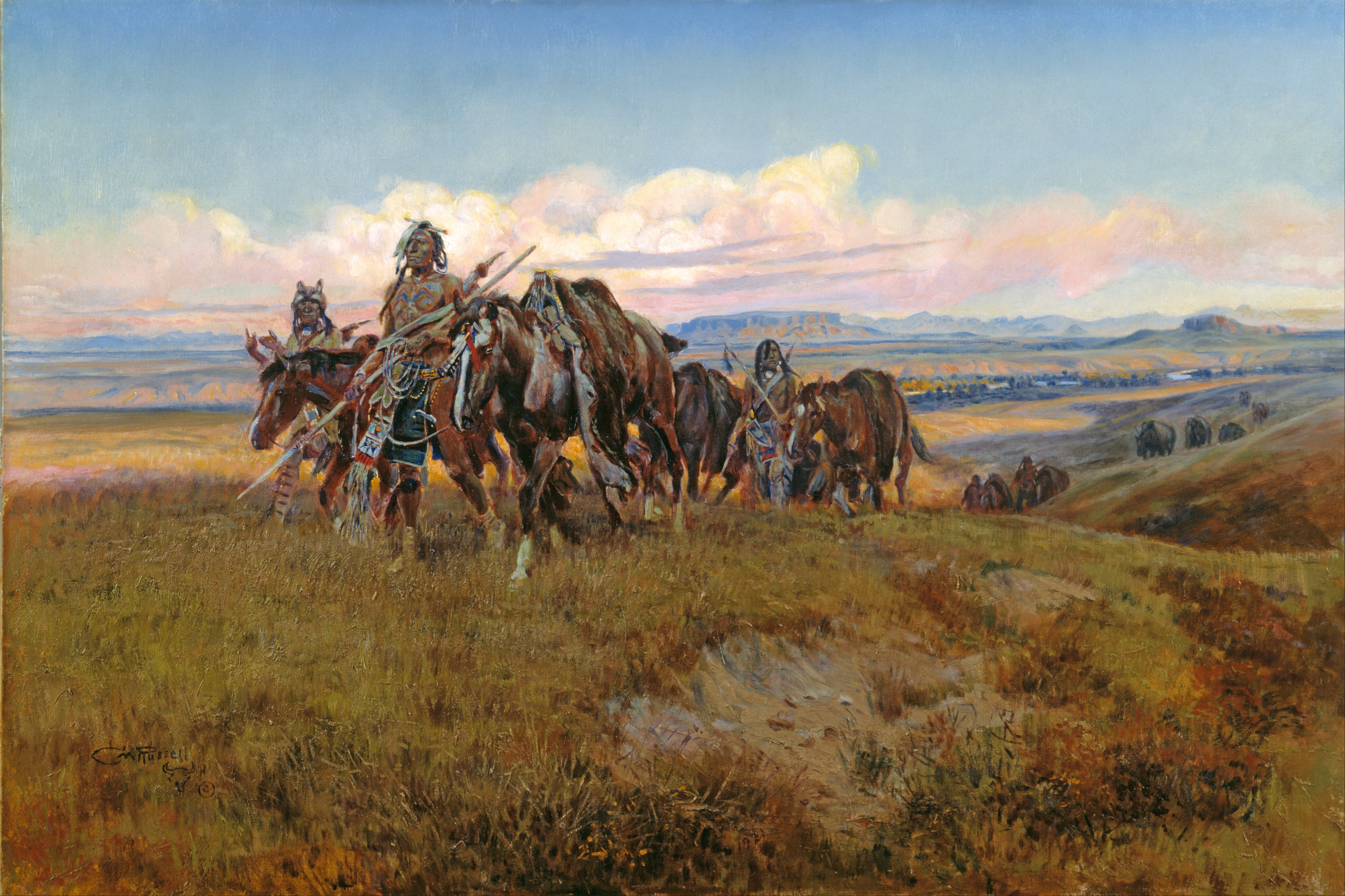
Charles Marion Russell

== Learning and Engagement ==
The museum's Learning & Engagement department has emphasized three areas: 1) Research in making museum visits successful and enjoyable; 2) Creation of installed learning materials (e.g., audio tours, labeling, video and reading areas, response journals and hands-on and artmaking areas); and 3) Interactive learning for young people both in school and family groups. Family-friendly programs and activities include the Just for Fun Family Center, gallery games, the Discovery Library, Kids Corner and Family Backpacks. Access programs at the DAM include Art & About tours, for visitors with early-stage Alzheimer's or dementia; Low Sensory Mornings; and Tactile Tables.

A key priority of the Denver Art Museum's ongoing campus transformation project is to center the DAM's educational programs at the heart of the campus. The new Bartlit Learning and Engagement Center features more than 12,000 square-feet of flexible programming space, workshop rooms and the Singer Pollack Family Wonderscape, which will present student-created exhibitions and host school and community events. With interactive spaces designed by Mexico City-based Esrawe + Cadena, the interactive Bartlit Center also features the Morgridge Creative Hub. Spanning more than 5,600 square-feet.

== Funding ==
The museum is run by a non-profit organization separate from the City of Denver. Major funding for the museum is provided by a 0.1% sales tax levied in the Scientific and Cultural Facilities District (SCFD), which includes seven Colorado counties (Adams, Arapahoe, Boulder, Broomfield, Denver, Douglas and Jefferson) in the Denver-Aurora metropolitan area. The district provides funding to about 300 arts, cultural and scientific organizations in the seven counties. About 65% of this tax is used to provide funding for the Denver Art Museum and four other major science and cultural facilities in Denver: the Denver Botanic Gardens, the Denver Zoo, the Denver Museum of Nature and Science and the Denver Center for the Performing Arts. In addition, the museum receives large private donations and loans from private collections. Over the past five years, the Denver Art Museum has averaged more than 600,000 visitors a year.

== Media mentions ==
The museum was mentioned in Smithsonian Channel's Aerial America "Colorado" episode in 2012. Ten years later, it was mentioned in a How Do they Build That? episode (also on Smithsonian). In 2022, The Denver Post published an investigative series into the role of Emma Bunker, a museum trustee, in the looted antiquities trade. On January 11, 2024, The Denver Post broke the story that a supermajority of the Denver Art Museum's employees announced their intention to unionize wall to wall, including all eligible employees across all departments during the all-staff meeting that morning. Despite the employees having a supermajority of pro-union workers, the director of the museum, Christoph Heinrich, verbally rejected to voluntarily recognize the union during the all-staff, and later in an email to all of the museum's employees.
