= Millbrook School =

Private school in Stanford, New York, US

Location
- Stanford, New York; United States; 41°51′20″N 73°37′16″W

Information
- Type: Private, Boarding & Day
- Motto: Non Sibi Sed Cunctis; Not for oneself, but for all
- Established: 1931
- Headmaster: Jonathan Downs '98
- Faculty: 100
- Grades: 9–12
- Gender: Coeducational
- Enrollment: 310 students
- Average class size: 11 students
- Student to teacher ratio: 4.1:1
- Campus: Rural, 800 acres (3 km^{2})
- Houses: 9 boarding houses - Abbott Hall, Burton Hall, Case Hall, Clark Hall, Farmhouse, Guest House, Harris Hall, Koenigsberger Hall, Prum Hall
- Colors: Navy Blue & Grey
- Athletics: 14 interscholastic sports
- Athletics conference: NEPSAC
- Mascot: Mustang
- Accreditation: NYSAIS
- Yearbook: The Tamarack
- Website: www.millbrook.org

Millbrook School is a private, coeducational preparatory boarding school in Stanford, New York, United States.

== History ==
Millbrook School was founded in 1931 by Edward Pulling. Pulling was a graduate of both Princeton University and Cambridge University, and he taught at Groton School and Avon Old Farms as well as private schools in the United Kingdom. While at Avon, Pulling began to think of creating his own school. After searching for suitable grounds to house the school, Pulling and his wife decided on the Stephenson farm five miles (8 km) outside Millbrook in nearby Stanford, New York.

== Trevor-Lovejoy Zoo ==
Trevor-Lovejoy Zoo is the only zoo in the United States inside a high school. The founder of the zoo was Frank Trevor, the first biology teacher at the school who started in 1936 and founded the zoo with his students. The zoo houses 170 exotic and indigenous animals representing 70 different species, 10 of them endangered. It is accredited by the AZA, the Associations of Zoos and Aquariums. Millbrook students are involved with care of the wildlife. A curriculum called Zoo community service encourages students to engage in animal husbandry, diet preparation, and veterinary medicine. The zoo was renamed as the Trevor-Lovejoy Zoo in June 2025 to honor Dr. Thomas Lovejoy, a conservation biologist who graduated from Millbrook in 1959 and credited the zoo with influencing his career path and mission to help protect biodiversity.

== Notable alumni ==
- Serena Altschul, journalist
- Francisco L. Borges, Connecticut State Treasurer
- James L. Buckley, U.S. Senator, U.S. Court of Appeals judge.
- William F. Buckley, Jr., author and editor
- Schuyler Chapin, commissioner of cultural affairs for New York City
- Frederic C. Hamilton, businessman
- John Dawson, musician
- Alistair Horne, author, class 1943
- Del Water Gap (Samuel Holden Jaffe), musician
- Robert Wood Johnson IV, Chairman and CEO of Johnson & Johnson, owner of the New York Jets, and US Ambassador to the United Kingdom
- Nicholas Kazan, writer, producer, and director
- David Guy Levy, producer
- Thomas Lovejoy, conservation biologist, former director of the World Wildlife Fund, class of 1959
- Josh Newman, California state senator
- Christopher Ross, sculptor, designer and collector
- Whit Stillman, writer and director
- Rachel Uchitel, nightclub manager, class of 1992
- Rufus Wainwright, musician
