= Las Fotos Project =

Photography mentoring organization in Los Angeles

Las Fotos Project is a nonprofit organization in East Los Angeles, California that mentors teenage girls and gender-expansive youth from local communities of color in using photography. The organization supports self-expression, leadership skills and social well-being.

Las Fotos Project is a 501(c)(3) organization that was founded in 2010 by Eric Ibarra. Ibarra left in 2020, whereupon it become 100% women of color-led, with Lucía Torres becoming executive director. The project was based in Lincoln Heights and in 2019 it moved to Boyle Heights.

Three courses are offered: on self-exploration, using introspective photography and self-portraiture; on photojournalism by documenting social issues in the community; and on creative entrepreneurial skills for a career, connecting students with paid photography jobs. Classes are taught in the evening and on weekends during 12-week spring and fall semesters.

== Publications ==
- Age of Change. Self-published, 2020. Book with zine.
