= Mateo Romero (artist) =

Native American painter

- Born: December 9, 1966 (age 59); Berkeley, California
- Education: MFA University of New Mexico, BFA Dartmouth College, Institute of American Indian Arts, Academy of Art University
- Known for: printmaking, painting
- Movement: Pueblo art

Mateo Romero (born 1966) is a Native American painter. He was born in Berkeley, California, and is a member of the Cochiti Pueblo.

== Background ==
Mateo Romero was born on December 9, 1966. His father, Santiago Romero was a Southern Keresan Cochiti artist. His mother is Nellie Guth, a European-American. His father's mother, Teresita Chavez Romero, was a traditional ceramicist, known for her seated clay figurines and functional jars or ollas. Mateo's Indian name is He-tse-tewa or "War Shield."

== Art career ==
Romero attended Dartmouth College, Hanover, New Hampshire and studied under Varujan Boghosian and Frank Moss. He briefly attended the Institute of American Indian Arts. At the University of New Mexico in Albuquerque, Romero earned his MFA Degree in printmaking. At the School for Advanced Research, he furthered his painting techniques as a Dubin Fellow in 2002. In 2008, he was chosen to be the SWAIA Indian Market poster artist.

Mateo began painting narrative scenes providing social commentary on contemporary Pueblo life. Subject matter for his paintings falls into four categories: "Addictions," "Indian Gaming," "Bonnie and Clyde," and "Voices at Wounded Knee," according to writer Gregory Schaaf, PhD. He moved towards mixed media and began working with historical photographs his "Dancers" series, which employs a technique he personally invented that incorporates asphalt into the surface.

Romero's work was part of Stretching the Canvas: Eight Decades of Native Painting (2019–21), a survey at the National Museum of the American Indian George Gustav Heye Center in New York.

== Personal ==
Romero lives in Pojoaque Pueblo with his wife, Melissa, and their three children, Rain, Povi, and Erik. His brother, Diego Romero is also a successful artist.

== Collections ==
Peabody Essex Museum
