= Muscarelle Museum of Art =

Art museum in Virginia, US

Coordinates: 37.2679526°N 76.7158878°W

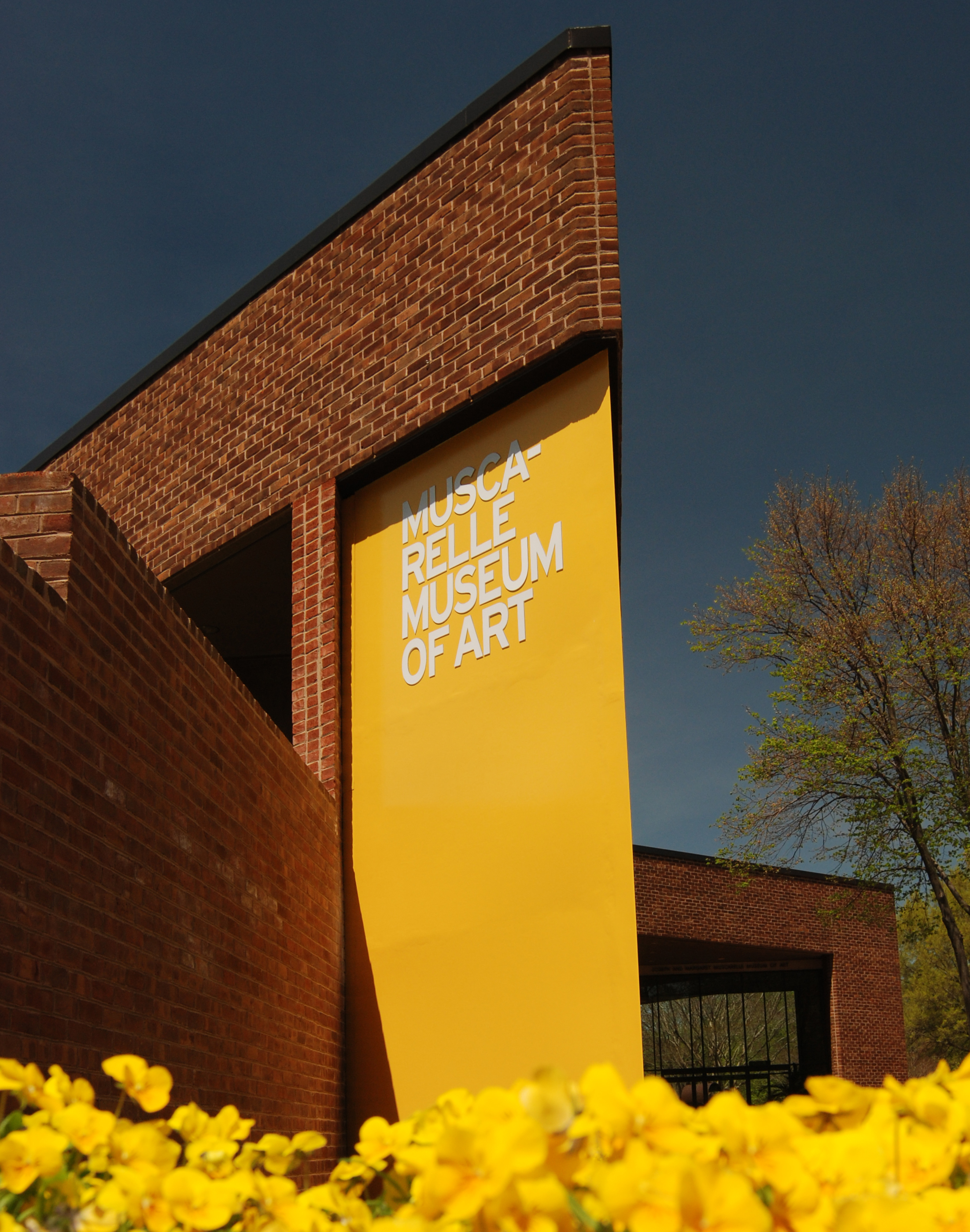
- Muscarelle Museum of Art in 2009
- Established: 1983
- Location: College of William & Mary; Williamsburg, Virginia
- Type: Art museum
- Accreditation: American Alliance of Museums
- Collection size: 6,000 objects
- Website: muscarelle.wm.edu

The Muscarelle Museum of Art is a university museum affiliated with the College of William & Mary in Williamsburg, Virginia. While the Museum only dates to 1983, the university art collection has been in existence since its first gift – a portrait of the physicist Robert Boyle – in 1732. Most early gifts to William & Mary relate to its history or the history of the Commonwealth of Virginia. Gifts of portraiture were the foundation of the early collection and include many First Families of Virginia (FFV) including sitters from the Page, Bolling and Randolph families.

== History ==
Throughout the years, gifts of art continued to accumulate including a donation of White Flower by Georgia O'Keeffe given to William & Mary in 1938 by Abby Aldrich Rockefeller. This major work in the collection had indiscriminately "decorated" various campus walls, old and new, until it was re-discovered by President Thomas Ashley Graves Jr. in the 1970s. Graves tasked Miles Chappell, from the department of art and art history, to make a college-wide inventory. It was at that time that the immensity and importance of the growing collection was understood and the need for a university museum became apparent.

With the support of numerous alumni, including a major benefactor, Joseph L. Muscarelle (W&M '27) and his wife Margaret, the Carlton Abbott designed Muscarelle Museum of Art opened in 1983 with Glenn D. Lowry as director. In 1987, the second director, Mark Johnson oversaw the expansion of the facility and the first American Alliance of Museums accreditation in 1988. Subsequent accreditations came in 2000 under then-director Bonnie Kelm, and in 2012 under former director Aaron De Groft. David M. Brashear was appointed as interim director in January 2019, and in June 2020 was named as the museum's fifth director.

== Current activities ==
Today the collection numbers close to 8,000 works. Of particular note are Colonial American and English seventeenth and eighteenth century portraits; a survey collection of original prints and drawings from the fifteenth through the twenty-first centuries including Japanese prints and a major collection of German Expressionist works by Hans Grohs; and the Jean Outland Chrysler collection of American modern works interpreted in oils, drawings, watercolors, and sculpture. Recent acquisitions include European master works by such artists as Luca Giordano and Luca Forte, historic photographic works by Julia Margaret Cameron, Carleton E. Watkins and Edward S. Curtis, as well as contemporary Native American works by Kay WalkingStick, Jaune Quick-to-See Smith, Emmi Whitehorse, and Cara Romero.

A renovation and expansion of the existing museum concluded in early 2025, creating a state of the art facility as part of the Martha Wren Briggs Center for the Visual Arts at the original Jamestown Road campus location. Designed by world-renowned architects Pelli Clarke & Partners, the expanded Muscarelle Museum of Art includes additional gallery space for both traveling exhibitions and the permanent collection as well as additional space for lectures, events, and programming.

== Selected exhibitions ==
Exhibition	Start date	End date
Michelangelo: The Genesis of the Sistine	March 6, 2025	May 28, 2025
Shared Ideologies, Selected works by Native American artists from the 1970s to the Present	September 1, 2021	February 13, 2022
Forever Marked By The Day	September 10, 2021	January 23, 2022
1619 / 2019	November 6, 2019	January 26, 2020
Women with Vision: Masterworks from the Permanent Collection	February 10, 2018	May 13, 2018
In the Light of Caravaggio: Dutch and Flemish Paintings from Southeastern Museums	February 10, 2018	May 13, 2018
Building on the Legacy: African American Art from the Permanent Collection	September 2, 2017	January 14, 2018
Fred Eversley: 50 Tears an Artist: Light & Space & Energy	September 2, 2017	December 10, 2017
The Bones of the Earth: Scholars Rocks and the Natural World in Chinese Culture, Selections from the Robert Turvene Collection	April 21, 2017	August 13, 2017
The Art and Science of Connoisseurship	February 11, 2017	August 13, 2017
Botticelli and the Search for the Divine: Florentine Painting between the Medici and the Bonfires of the Vanities	February 11, 2017	April 5, 2017
Building the Brafferton: The Founding, Funding and Legacy of America's Indian School	September 10, 2016	January 8, 2017
Contemporary American Marine Art: 17th National Exhibition of the American Society of Marine Artists	September 10, 2016	December 2, 2016
Norman Rockwell and the Boy Scouts	February 6, 2016	August 21, 2016
Hiroshige's 53 Stations of the Tōkaidō	February 6, 2016	August 21, 2016
Twilight of a Golden Age: Florentine Painting after the Renaissance, masterworks from the Haukohl Family Collection	April 25, 2015	January 17, 2016
Leonardo da Vinci and the Idea of Beauty	February 21, 2015	April 5, 2015
Tree to Mountain: The Woodblock Prints of Tōshi Yoshida	October 17, 2014	February 8, 2014
21st Century Diplomacy: Ballet, Ballots and Bullets	May 31, 2014	September 28, 2014
Caravaggio Connoisseurship: Saint Francis in Meditation and the Capitoline Fortune Teller	February 8, 2014	April 6, 2014
Glenn Close: A Life in Costume	September 28, 2013	January 12, 2014
A Brush with Passion: Mattia Preti (1613–1699)	February 9, 2013	April 14, 2013
Michelangelo: Sacred and Profane, Masterpieces from the Casa Buonarroti	February 9, 2013	April 14, 2013
African American Art: Harlem Renaissance, Civil Rights Era, and Beyond from the Smithsonian Art Museum	September 28, 2012	January 6, 2013
Athenian Potters and Painters: Greek Vases from Virginia Collections	August 18, 2012	October 7, 2012
Seeing Colors: Secrets of the Impressionists	October 20, 2011	January 22, 2012
In Memory Still: A Kiowa Legacy in Art	September 10, 2011	November 13, 2011
Envelopes: Architect's Unfinished Experiments with Building "Skins"	September 17, 2010	October 24, 2010
Merging Souls: Arts of Devotion in Latin America	April 24, 2010	July 18, 2010
Unbearable Beauty: Triumph of the Human Spirit, Photographs by W. Eugene Smith and Aileen M. Smith	April 24, 2010	July 18, 2010
Michelangelo: Anatomy as Architecture, Drawings by the Master	February 6, 2010	-
Deeply Superficial: Andy Warhol's "Voyeurism"	November 7, 2009	January 17, 2010
Spanish Baroque in the New World: Sibyls from Zurbarán's Studio	August 4, 2009	November 1, 2009
Tiffany Glass: A Riot of Color ("Art of Glass" ten year anniversary in Conjunction with Chrysler, Contemporary Art Center of VA, and the VA Arts Festival)	April 16, 2009	July 12, 2009
The Dutch Italianates: Seventeenth-Century Masterpieces from Dulwich Picture Gallery	November 13, 2008	March 22, 2009
Beyond the Edge of the Sea: Diversity of Life in the Deep-Ocean Wilderness	September 5	November 2, 2008
Painting the Italian Landscape: Views from the Uffizi	January 25, 2008	March 23, 2008
Legacy of the Generations: Jacob Lawerence's Legend of John Brown	November 16, 2007	December 16, 2007
America the Beautiful: The Monumental Landscape of Clyde Butcher	September 6, 2007	December 16, 2007
Building a College: The Colonial Revival Campus at The College of William & Mary	September 6, 2007	November 12, 2007
Stars & Stripes: Rare & Historic American Flags from the Collection of Mark and Rosalind Shenkman	June 16, 2007	July 29, 2007
Visions of the Soul: Works by Hans Friedrich Grohs	May 5, 2007	July 29, 2007
An American Story: The Wyeth Family Tradition In Art	April 21, 2007	May 27, 2007
Jaune Quick-To-See Smith: Contemporary Native American Paintings and the Response to Colonization	February 10, 2007	April 8, 2007
Medici in America, Natura Morta: Still-Life Paintings of the Medici Collections & Caravaggio's Still Life with Fruit on a Stone Ledge	November 11, 2006	January 7, 2007
The Tsar's Cabinet: Two Hundred Years of Russian Decorative Arts Under the Romanovs	August 26, 2006	October 8, 2006
Eloquent Vistas: The Art of Nineteenth-Century Landscape Photography from the George Eastman House Collection	November 5, 2005	January 8, 2006
Charles E. Burchfield: Backyards and Beyond	August 27, 2005	October 23, 2005
Toulouse-Lautrec: Master of the Moulin Rouge	August 28, 2004	October 24, 2004
American Studio Glass: A Survey of the Movement	January 24, 2004	March 21, 2004
Shaped with Passion: The Carl A. Weyerhaeuser Collection of Japanese Ceramics from the 1970s	August 18, 2001	October 7, 2001
Quilt National 1999: The Best in Contemporary Quilts	May 5, 2001	July 7, 2001
Georgia O'Keeffe in Williamsburg: A Re-Creation of the Artist's First Public Exhibition in the South	January 27, 2001	April 27, 2001
Bridges & Boundaries Revisited: African Americans & American Jews	August 26, 2000	October 29, 2000
Hung Liu: A Ten Year Survey 1988–1998	August 26, 1998	October 18, 1998
Ties That Bind: Iban Ikat Fabrics	July 11, 1998	August 16, 1998
Inuit II: From the Collection of Frederick & Lucy S. Herman; Contemporary American Indian Art: The Joe Fedderson Collection	August 23, 1997	October 19, 1997
Building Form: Ansel Adams & Architecture	June 14, 1997	August 17, 1997
Nell Blaine: Retrospective	October 19, 1996	December 1, 1996
Voyages & Visions: Nineteenth-Century European Images of the Middle East from the Victoria & Albert Museum	January 20, 1996	March 3, 1996
African-American Works on Paper	October 21, 1995	December 3, 1995
Before Discovery: Artistic Development in the Americas Before the Arrival of Columbus	May 27, 1995	August 27, 1995
The Passionate Observer: Photographs by Carl Van Vechten	April 1, 1995	May 21, 1995
The Reverend James Blair: Preparatory Models & Drawings for the Stature by Lewis Cohen	February 25, 1995	May 21, 1995
Drawn on the Spot: Perceptions and Views	October 15, 1994	January 8, 1995
A Golden Age of Painting: Dutch, Flemish & German Paintings of the 16th – 17th Centuries from the Sarah Campbell Blaffer Foundation, Houston, Texas; The Fine Art of Drawing: Works on Paper from the Museum and the Herman Foundation Collections	January 23, 1993	March 21, 1993
Lila Katzen Quincentenary Sculpture Exhibition: Isabel, Columbus & the Statue of Liberty	February 29, 1992	April 5, 1992
Rodin: Sculpture from the B. Gerald Cantor Collection	February 28, 1991	April 28, 1991
Portraits & Prospects: British & Irish Drawings & Watercolors from the Collection of the Ulster Museum	January 13, 1990	March 4, 1990
Photographs by David Hockney	March 18, 1989	April 30, 1989
Art & the Law	December 21, 1987	January 17, 1988
Photographs by Yousuf Karsh	July 4, 1987	September 20, 1987
Modernism in America: 1937–1941	August 25, 1985	November 17, 1985
19th Century German Drawings from the Frederick & Lucy S. Herman Foundation	April 24, 1985	May 4, 1985
Gene Davis: Child & Man Collaboration	January 11, 1985	February 25, 1985
Into the Melting Pot: The Immigration of American Modernism (1909–1929)	October 8, 1984	January 10, 1985
In Search of Light: Spanish Painters from 1850–1950	May 11, 1984	July 9, 1984
Late 20th Century Art from the Sydney & Frances Lewis Foundation	February 4, 1984	April 30, 1984
Form, Function, & Finesse: Drawings from the Frederick & Lucy Herman Foundation	October 21, 1983	December 21, 1983
