= Stanley C. Hunt =

Canadian First Nations artist from coastal British Columbia

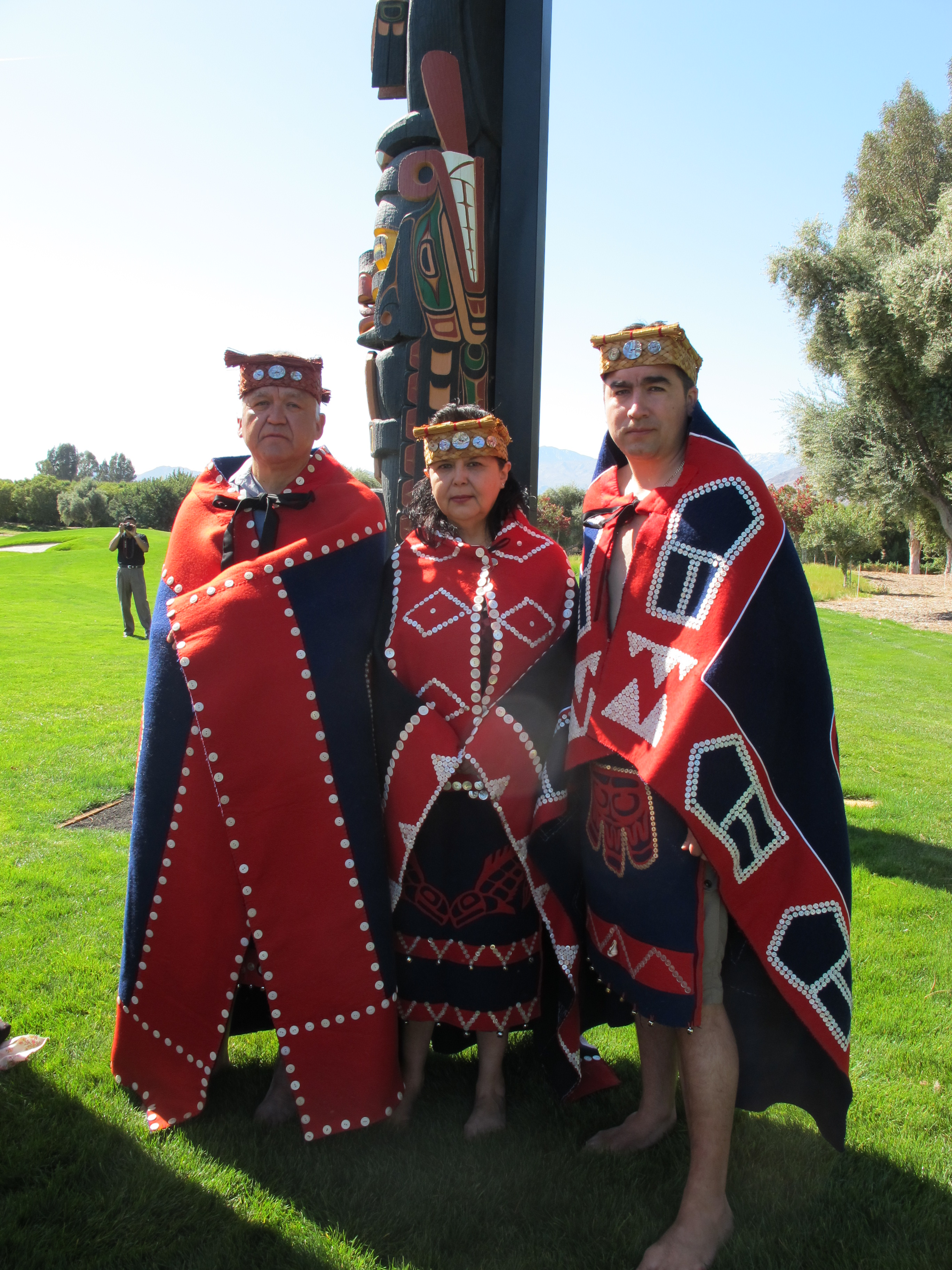
- Stanley C. Hunt (left), his wife Lavina Hunt, and their son Jason Hunt, 2012, at Sunnylands in the Coachella Valley, California
- Born: 1954 (age 71–72); Victoria, British Columbia, Canada
- Known for: Sculpture, Painting, Mentorship

Stanley Clifford Hunt (born 1954) is a Canadian, First Nations Kwakiutl artist from British Columbia.

== History ==
On his father's side, Stanley C. Hunt is a descendant of Native ethnologist George Hunt. He is also a descendant of a family of artists including his grandfather Mungo Martin, and his father Henry Hunt. He and his brothers Richard (born 1951) and Tony (1942–2017) are all renowned international artists. Stanley was born when his grandfather was Chief Carver at Thunderbird Park British Columbia Provincial Museum in Victoria, British Columbia. His father succeeded his grandfather as Chief Carver in 1962.

== Artist and teacher ==
Stanley is an active artist working from his studio in Fort Rupert on Vancouver Island. He and his family teach traditional carving techniques to the next generation. Stanley's work resides in private, public, and museum collections.

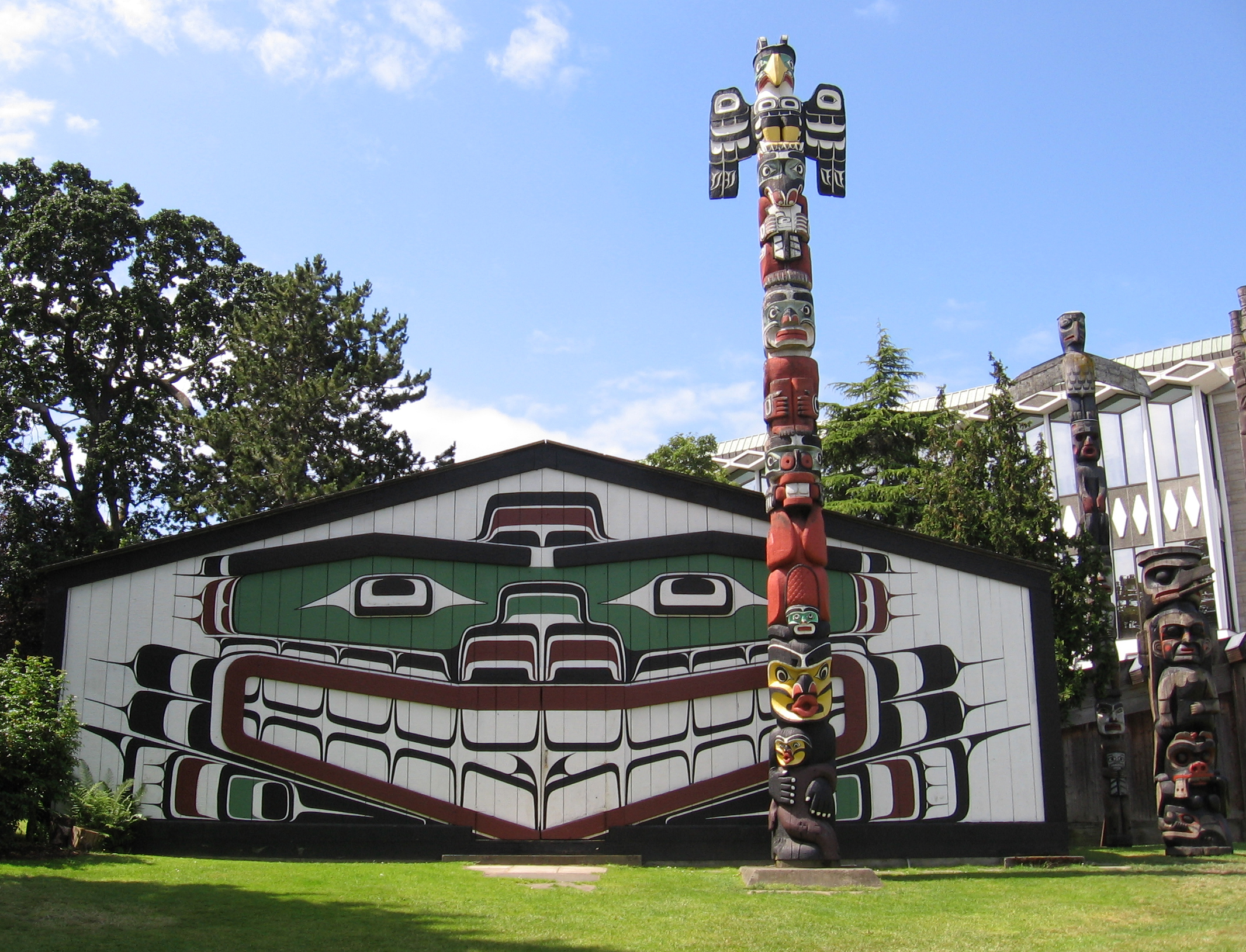
Big house and totems in Thunderbird Park (Victoria, British Columbia) Left to right: Mungo Martin House aka Wawadit'la (traditional en:Kwakwaka'wakw "big house", 1953), Kwakwaka'wakw heraldic pole (1953), Kwakwaka'wakw pole (1981), Kwakwaka'wakw pole (1954).

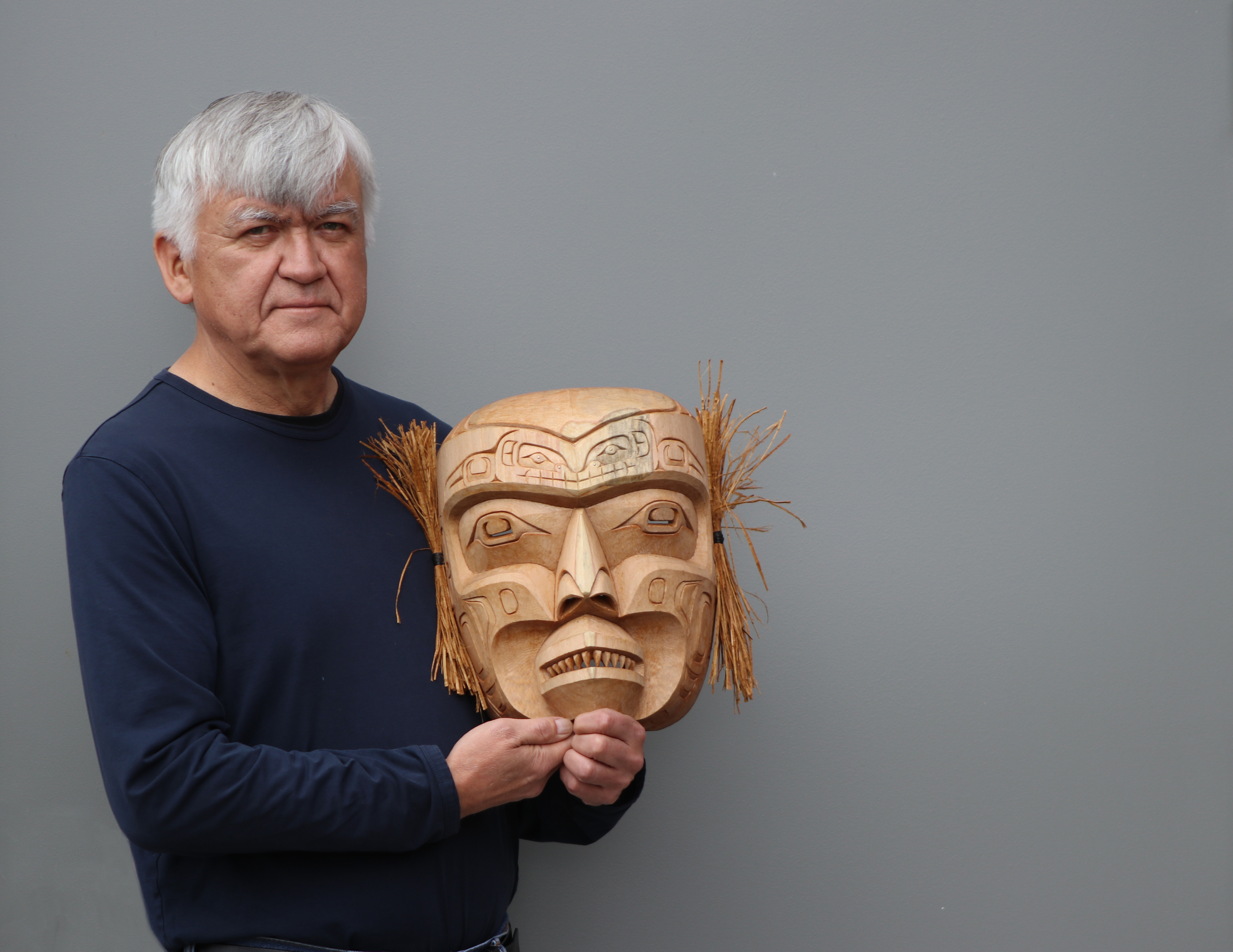
Stan Hunt with mask, 2019

== Documentary film ==
A documentary film, Totem was produced in 2013 by director/cinematographer/screenwriter, Franca González. This joint Canada/Argentina production chronicles Stanley's 2012 monumental 40+ foot pole-carving project which replaced a pole installed in 1964 in Plaza Canadá, Buenos Aires, Argentina, carved by his famous father, Henry Hunt. The film's world premiere occurred at the Vancouver Latin American Film Festival in September 2013. Additional film festival screenings include the DocBsAs International Festival 2014, Argentina; the International Documentary Festival, 2014, Catalunya, Spain; and the Mérida and Yucatán International Film Festival, 2015, Mexico.

== Family legacy of cultural preservation ==
Stanley's grandfather, Mungo Martin is credited with saving and preserving Kwakiutl arts and culture by secretly maintaining potlatch ceremonies during the Canadian potlatch ban which outlawed these social events and the native arts associated with them. The ban lasted from 1885 to 1951. The first legal potlatch after the law was repealed in 1951 was overseen by Martin in Victoria. During the ban Martin carved two totem poles for the Canadian Pavilion at the 1939 New York World's Fair. These were a sensation and contained a subtle message protesting the ban: at the top of the pole, two thunderbirds spread their wings standing on the heads of giant grizzly bears. These are all symbols of strength and are representatives of his family crest. At the bottom of the pole was the emblem of Canada, two beavers. In 1949, the University of British Columbia hired Martin to replicate the poles. While resident carver he built on site his own big house and collected and preserved 400 songs and oral histories. He is credited with the rebirth of an artistic heritage once pronounced dead.

Continuing the family legacy of preserving cultural heritage, Stanley carved a 42 ft 10 in. totem pole for Plaza Canadá in Buenos Aires, Argentina, in 2012 to replace a 60-foot Henry Hunt/Mungo Martin pole which was installed there in 1962. The original pole had deteriorated beyond repair so Stanley was commissioned to replace the pole after representatives of the Argentine embassy sought a carver from the Hunt family. The pole contains Hunt family crests including a bear holding a halibut. A chief resides at the top of the pole holding a shield of copper which represents Henry Hunt. A killer whale represents the crest of Stanley Hunt's wife, Lavina Hunt, originally from Alert Bay.

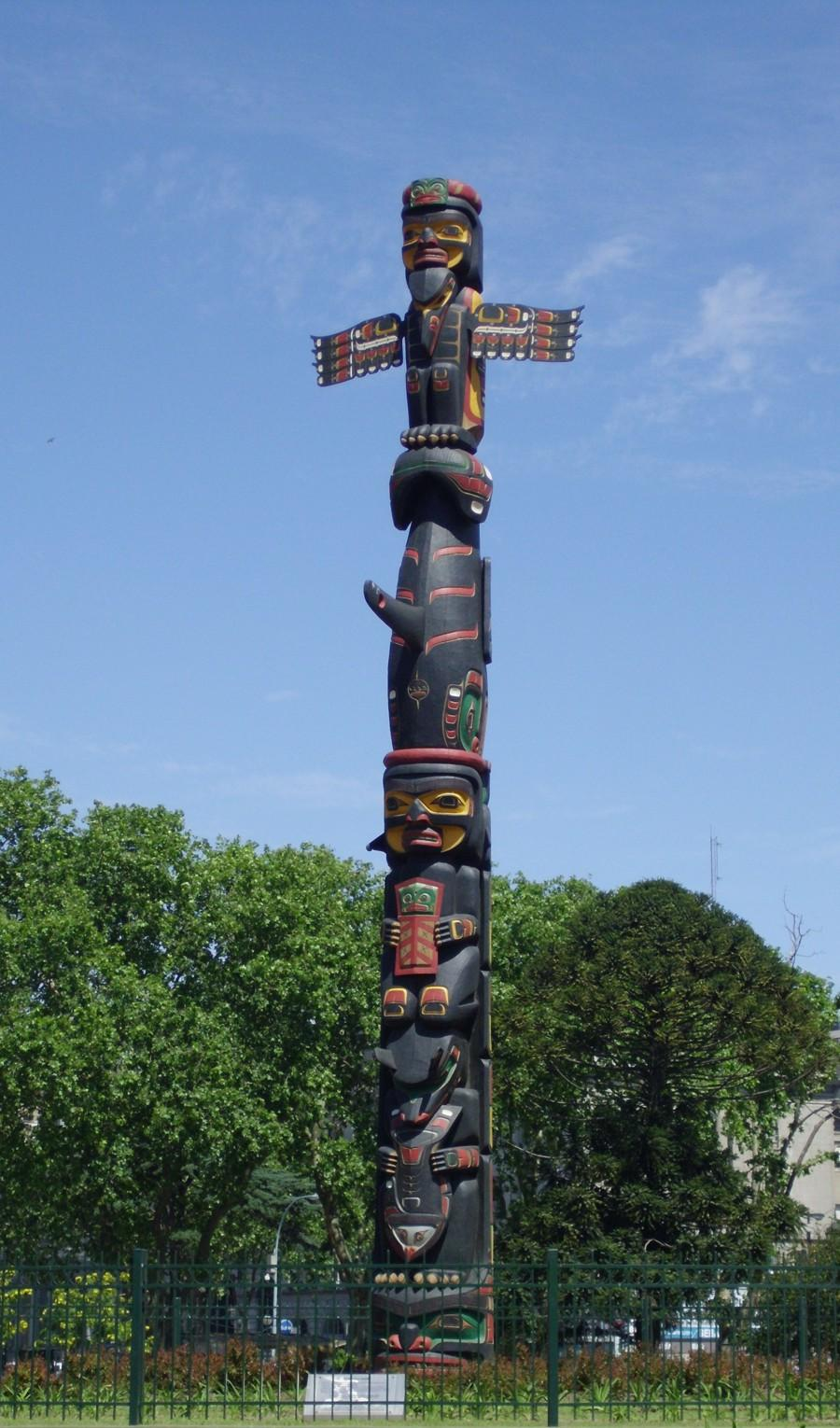
A 42 ft 10 in. Stanley Hunt-carved totem pole, 2012, Plaza Canadá, Buenos Aires, Argentina

In another example of preserving his family's carving culture, in 2010 Stanley, his wife Lavina, and their artist son Jason Henry Hunt traveled to Rancho Mirage California to restore his father's 30-foot totem pole which was commissioned by Walter Annenberg and Leonore Annenberg in 1976 and resides at their former home, the Sunnylands estate. In 2015, Stanley and his son Jason again traveled to California to restore another Henry Hunt totem pole which preceded the Sunnylands' pole arrival in the Coachella Valley when it was installed in Palm Springs. The Palm Springs pole had been a gift to the city in 1968 through the sister city program and still resides in its original location on Racquet Club Road in Victoria Park.
