= Royal British Columbia Museum =

History museum in Victoria, British Columbia

Coordinates: 48°25′10″N 123°22′4″W

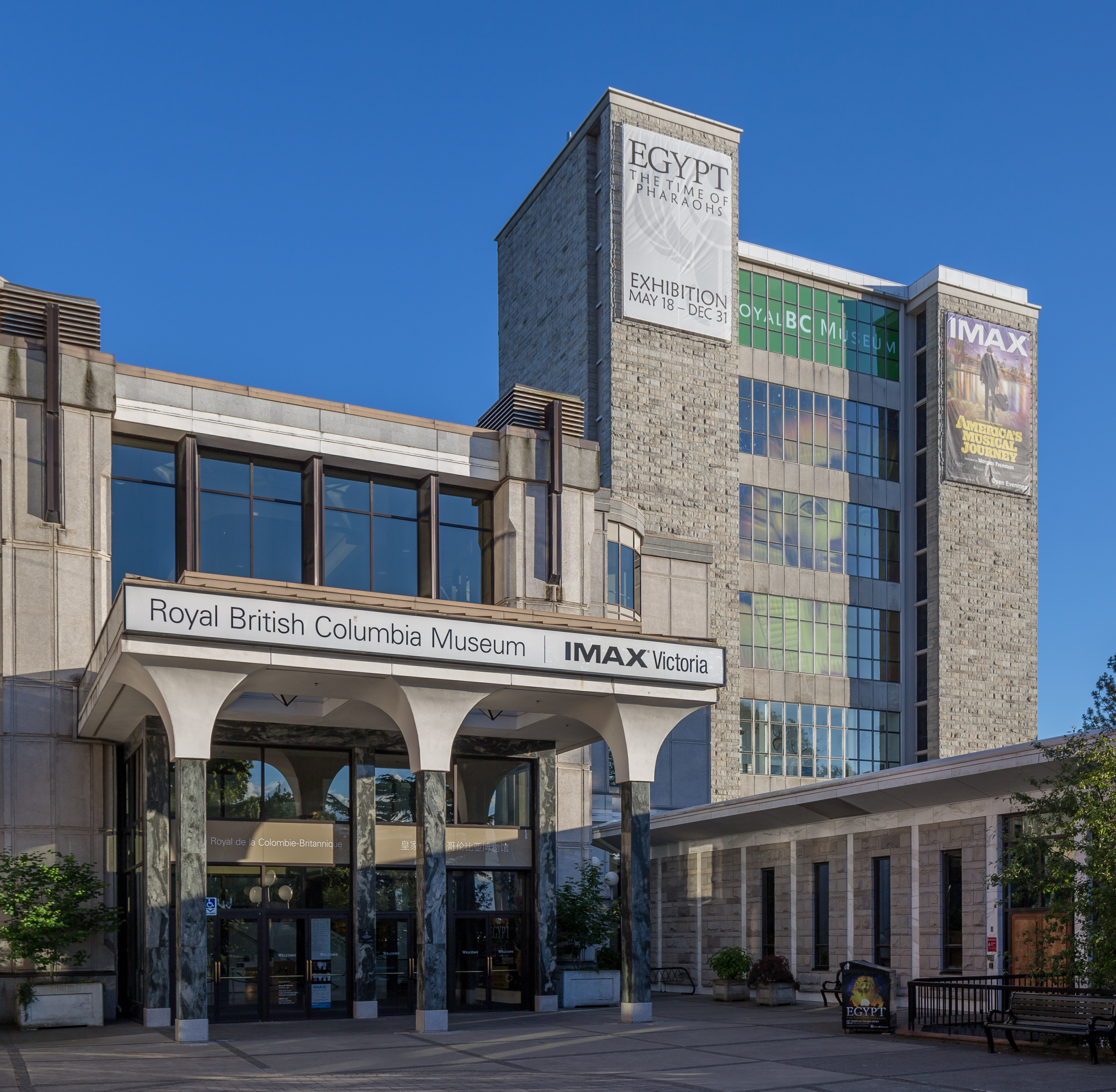
- Established: 1886
- Location: Victoria, British Columbia
- Type: Provincial history museum and archives
- Collection size: Over 7 million
- Visitors: 770,000 (2017)
- Director: Ry Moran, Acting
- Public transit access: Bus routes 3, 27, 27x, 28, 30, 31
- Website: www.royalbcmuseum.bc.ca

The Royal British Columbia Museum (or Royal BC Museum), founded in 1886, is a history museum in Victoria, British Columbia, Canada. The "Royal" title was approved by Queen Elizabeth II and bestowed by Prince Philip in 1987, to coincide with a royal tour of that year. The museum merged with the British Columbia Provincial Archives in 2003.

The Royal BC Museum includes three permanent galleries: Natural History, Becoming BC, and the First Peoples Gallery. The museum's collections comprise approximately 7 million objects, including natural history specimens, artifacts, and archival records. The natural history collections have 750,000 records of specimens almost exclusively from BC and neighbouring states, provinces, or territories. The collections are divided into eight disciplines: Entomology, Botany, Palaeontology, Ichthyology, Invertebrate Zoology, Herpetology, Mammalogy, and Ornithology. The museum also hosts touring exhibitions. Previous exhibitions have included artifacts related to the RMS Titanic, Leonardo da Vinci, Egyptian artifacts, the Vikings, the British Columbia gold rushes and Genghis Khan. The Royal BC Museum partners with and houses the IMAX Victoria theater, which shows educational films as well as commercial entertainment.

The museum is beside Victoria's Inner Harbour, between the Empress Hotel and the Legislature Buildings. The museum anchors the Royal BC Museum Cultural Precinct, a surrounding area with historical sites and monuments, including Thunderbird Park. The museum also operates traveling exhibitions which tour the province of BC, as well as international exhibits Guangzhou, China.

On January 1, 2026, Ry Moran was appointed interim CEO of the Royal BC Museum. Various groups assist with the development, success, and maintenance of the Royal BC Museum. These include volunteers, who number over 500 and outnumber the Royal BC Museum staff 4 to 1; the Royal BC Museum Foundation (formerly Friends of the Royal BC Museum Foundation), a non-profit organization created in 1970 to support the Royal BC Museum financially and to assist its work by forming links within the community; Security Services, responsible for risk management, emergency response, security services, and business continuity expertise; and Property Management and Operations, who focus on sustainability, recycling, and environment control within the museum.

== History ==
The BC Government founded the British Columbia Provincial Museum in 1886 in response to a petition from prominent citizens who were concerned about the loss of British Columbian natural products and native artifacts. Judge Matthew Baillie Begbie, Charles Semlin, William Fraser Tolmie, and former Premier George A. Walkem were amongst those who wanted to stop European and American museums from appropriating BC artifacts. Notably, the petitioners argued that the export of First Nations artifacts was particularly troubling, under the premise that “their loss [was] frequently irreparable.”

On October 25, 1886, the 15-by-20-foot Provincial Museum of Natural History and Anthropology opened in the Birdcages (the former BC Legislative buildings). The first curator was naturalist John Fannin, who donated his own large collection of preserved birds and animals to the museum. After its inception, the Royal BC Museum continually expanded. In 1896, the museum was given space in the east wing of the new Legislative buildings. The museum's mandate was updated by the BC government in 1913, and the collection of natural history specimens and anthropological material became official parts of the museum's operations, as well as the dissemination of knowledge to the people of British Columbia. In 1921, the basement of the east annex of the Legislature was excavated to provide the museum with additional room.

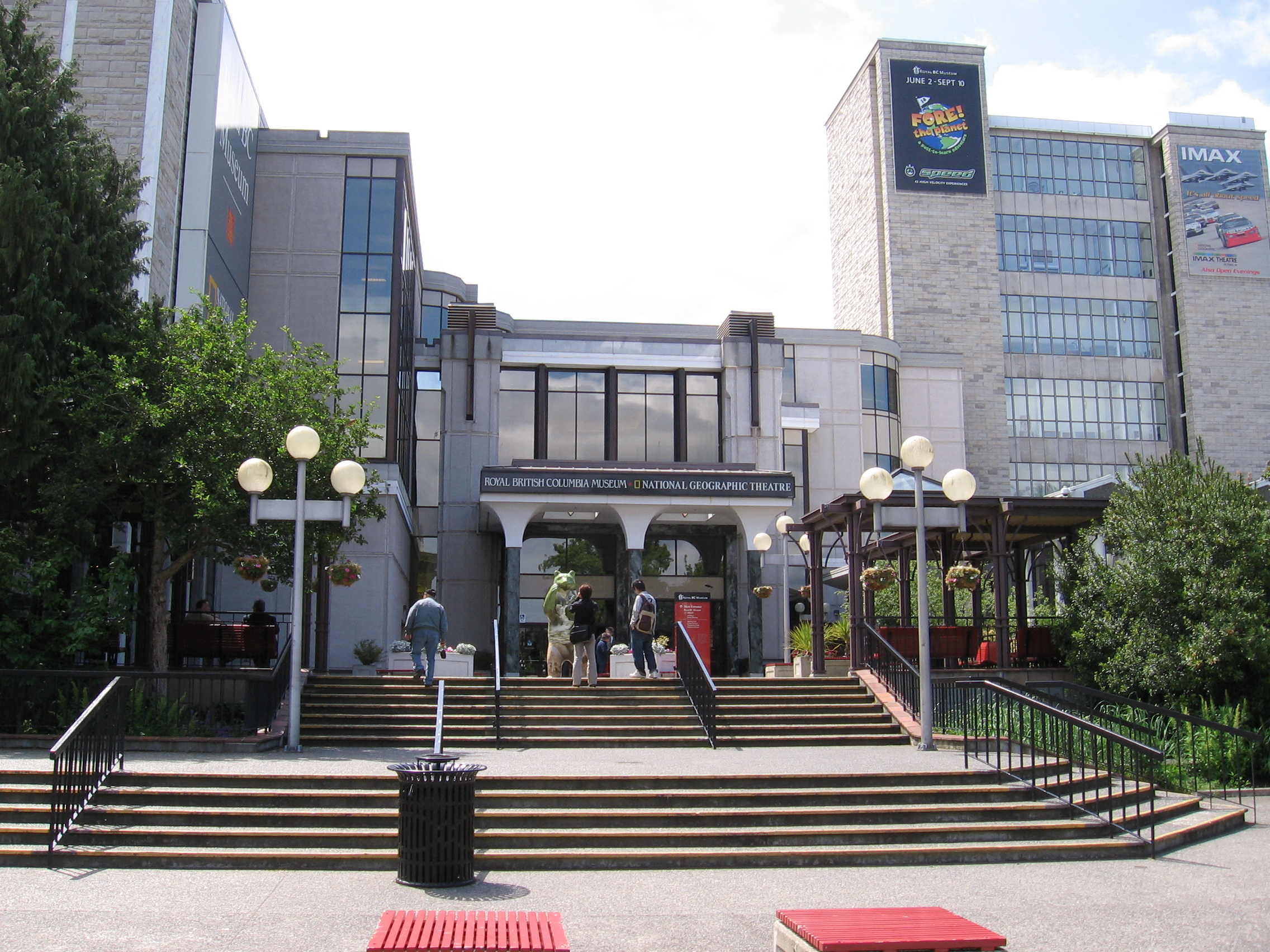
The present building used by the Royal British Columbia Museum. The building was opened in 1968.

As part of the 1967 Canadian centenary celebrations, BC Premier W. A. C. Bennett committed to building a new home for the Royal BC Museum. It opened on August 16, 1968, with a final construction budget of $9.5 million. The museum remains housed in this building.

One of the most prized displays is John Lennon's psychedelic Rolls-Royce. It was purchased by Vancouver billionaire Jim Pattison and donated to the museum.

== Cultural precinct ==
The museum is situated in the cultural precinct, an area comprising various significant historical buildings near the Inner Harbour. The cultural precinct occupies the space between Douglas Street, Belleville Street, and Government Street. Included in the cultural precinct is the BC Archives, Helmcken House, St. Ann's Schoolhouse (built in 1844), the Netherlands Centennial Carillon, Thunderbird Park, and Mungo Martin House, Wawadit'la, a traditional big house built by Mungo Martin and his family.

== Permanent galleries ==
The Royal BC Museum hosts 3 permanent galleries (Becoming BC, Natural History, and First Peoples galleries) focused on BC history and heritage.

=== First Peoples gallery ===
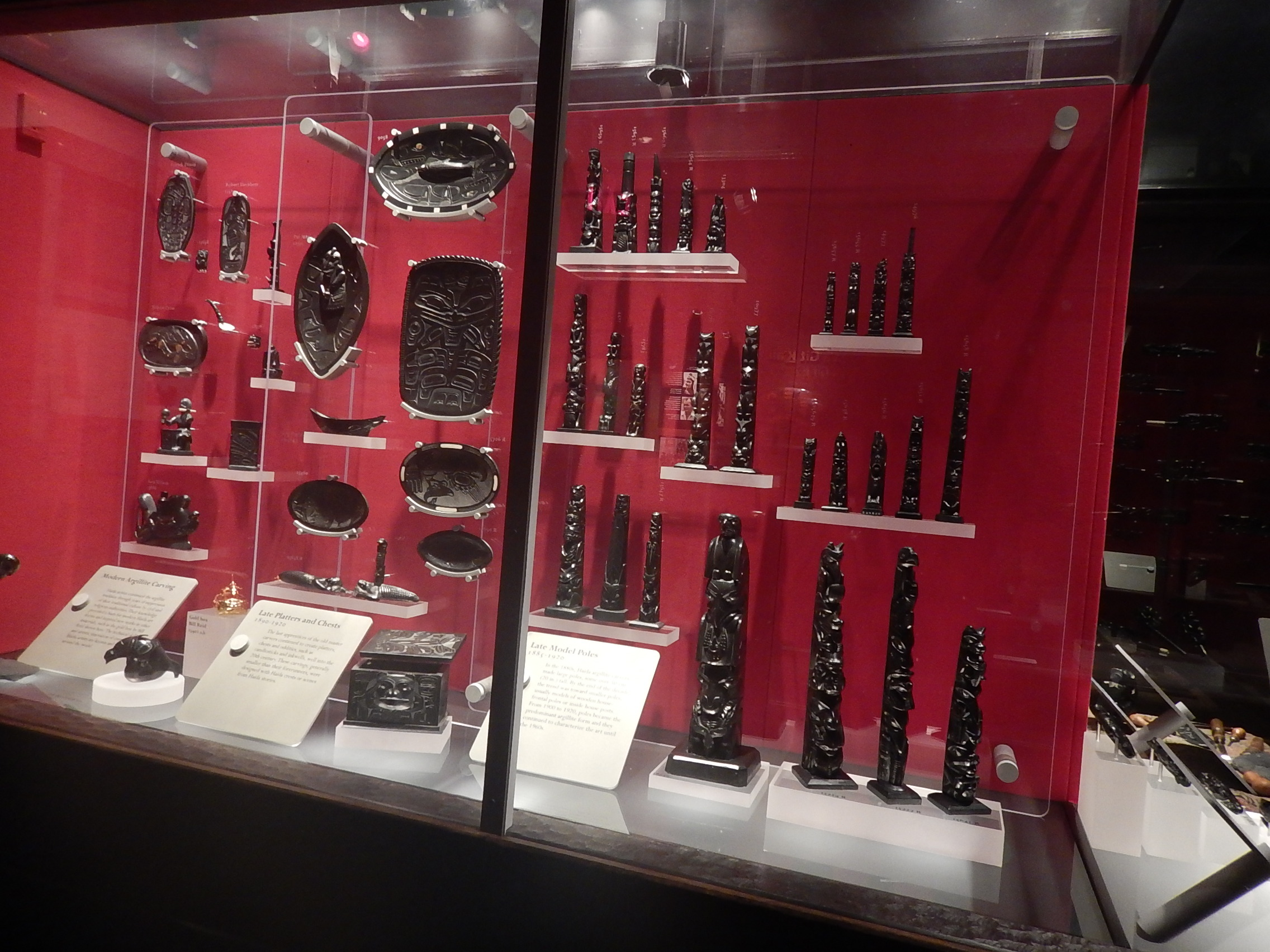
A Haida exhibit at the museum's First Peoples gallery.

The First Peoples gallery on the third floor contains a large collection of First Nations artifacts, and many of the artifacts in the gallery are from the Haida people. Artifacts in the First Peoples Gallery include a village model, as well as indigenous totem poles, garb, and masks (including Kwakwaka'wakw ceremonial masks made by Chief Nakap'ankam (Mungo Martin)). Notably, the gallery maintains the long house of Chief Kwakwabalasami (Jonathan Hunt), a Kwakwaka'wakw chief from Tsaxis (Fort Rupert). The house and surrounding carvings were created by his son, Henry Hunt, and his grandsons, Tony Hunt and Richard Hunt. An exhibit of artist Bill Reid's argillite carvings are also available for viewing.

The gallery has been criticized by indigenous scholars for its portrayal of First Nations people, and its use of controversial images and film from Edward Curtis. In 2010, many of the museum's Nisga'a artifacts were returned to the Nisga'a people and now reside in the Nisga'a Museum in northwestern British Columbia.

In early 2023 a totem pole belonging to Nuxalk First Nations was returned after it was sold to the museum in 1915.

=== Becoming BC galleries ===
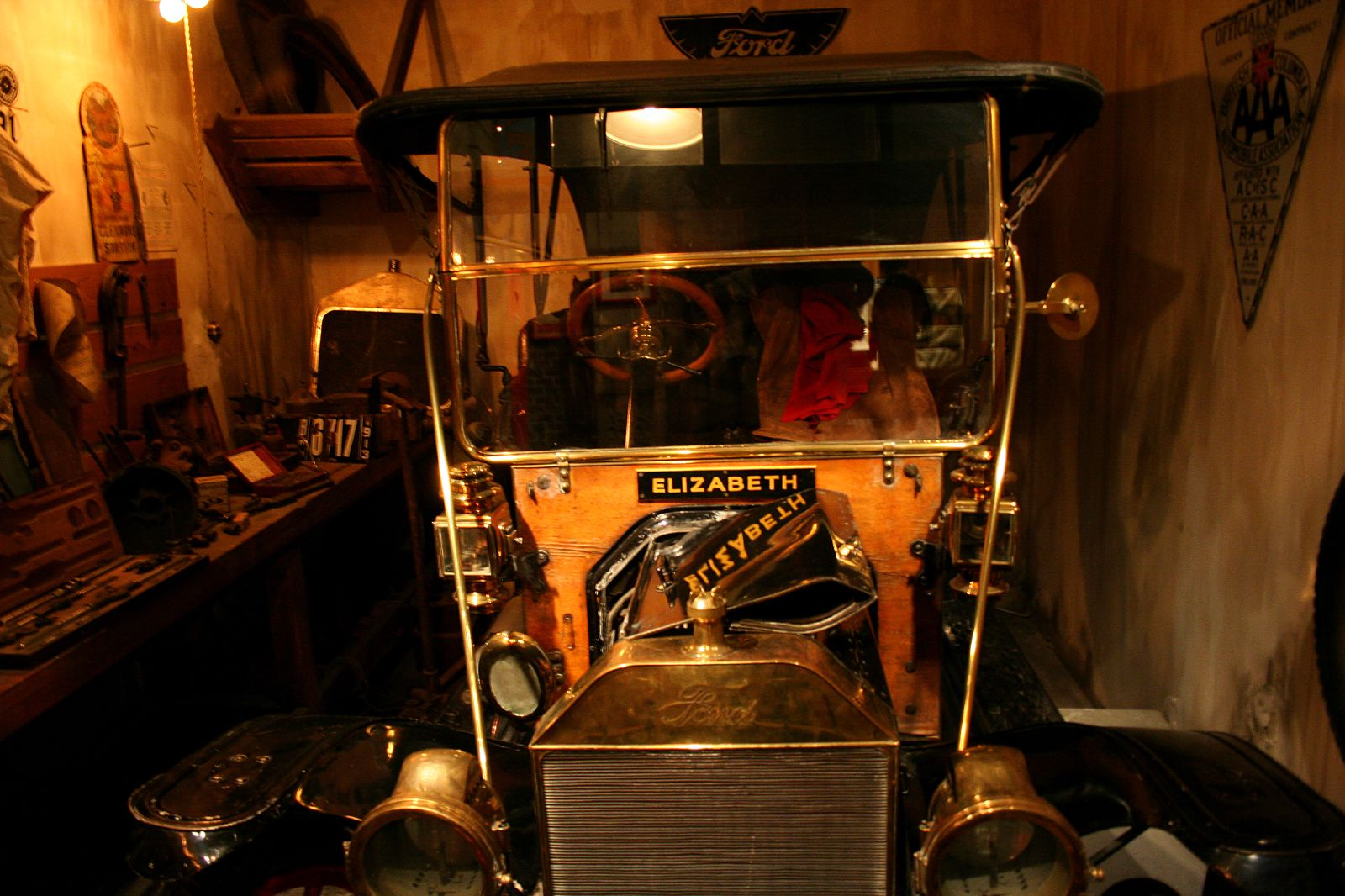
Recreation of an early 20th century garage in the modern history gallery.

The Becoming BC galleries on the third floor (12,524 sq. ft.) begins with "Century Hall," a collection of artifacts and replicas of BC's history over the last 200 years. Visitors pass into "Old Town," a life-sized model of Victoria in the 1870s–1920s. Old Town was designed and constructed between 1969 and 1972, and presents twenty separate building displays of various scales, including a replica of a cobblestone streetscape of early twentieth-century Victoria (with a silent movie theatre, a hotel, a train station, old automobiles, and Chinatown). The display shifts to a tour of early forestry, fishing, and mining industries (including a mine shaft and Cornish water wheel).

Also within the Becoming BC galleries is an exploration narrative containing models of the original Fort Victoria, a Port Moody train station, the 1902 Tremblay Homestead (from Peace River District), and a large-scale replica of Captain George Vancouver's ship HMS Discovery.

=== Natural history gallery ===
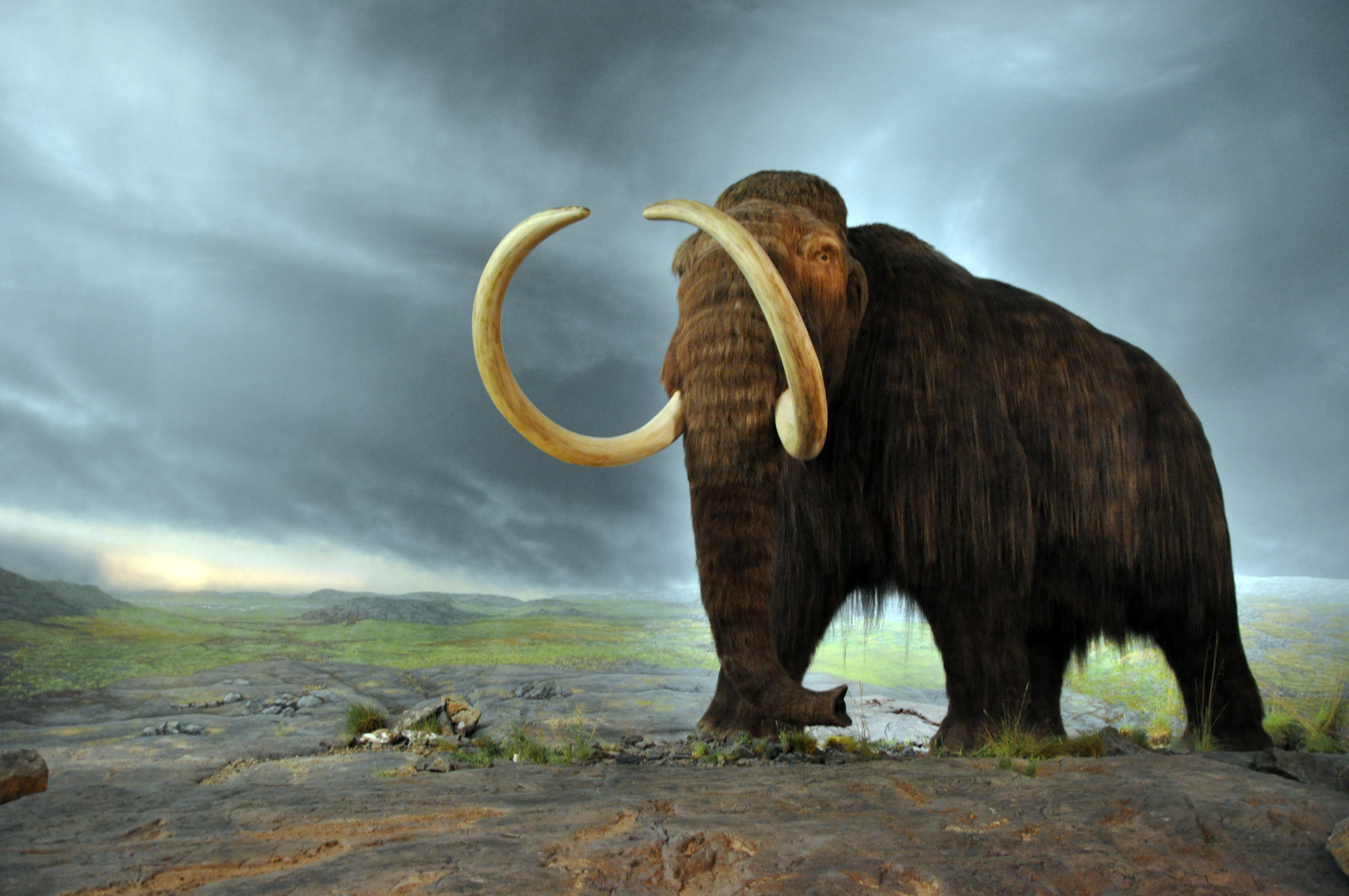
The diorama of a woolly mammoth in the natural history gallery.

The natural history gallery on the second floor (12,387 sq./ft.) contains information, artifacts, and life-sized displays of the diverse geography of the province from prehistoric time to present day (including the Fraser River delta and the popular woolly mammoth). There is a range of fossils and taxidermic specimens, and a tide pool that contains live crabs, limpids, and starfish, among constructed specimens.

More recently, a section on climate was added to the Natural History gallery, including information on the effects of modern climate change. Visitors may also view the Ocean Station in this gallery, a mock Victorian-era submarine that houses a 360-litre aquarium.

== Collections ==
The Royal BC Museum's collection policy states that the museum's collection must pertain to the natural or human history of BC. The collection is divided into specific categories of "significant objects," "representative objects," and "comparative objects." The Museum Act authorizes the Royal BC Museum to enable the preservation and management of the collection by securing, receiving, providing access to, and maintaining artifacts that adroitly illustrate the natural or human history of British Columbia.

=== Human history ===
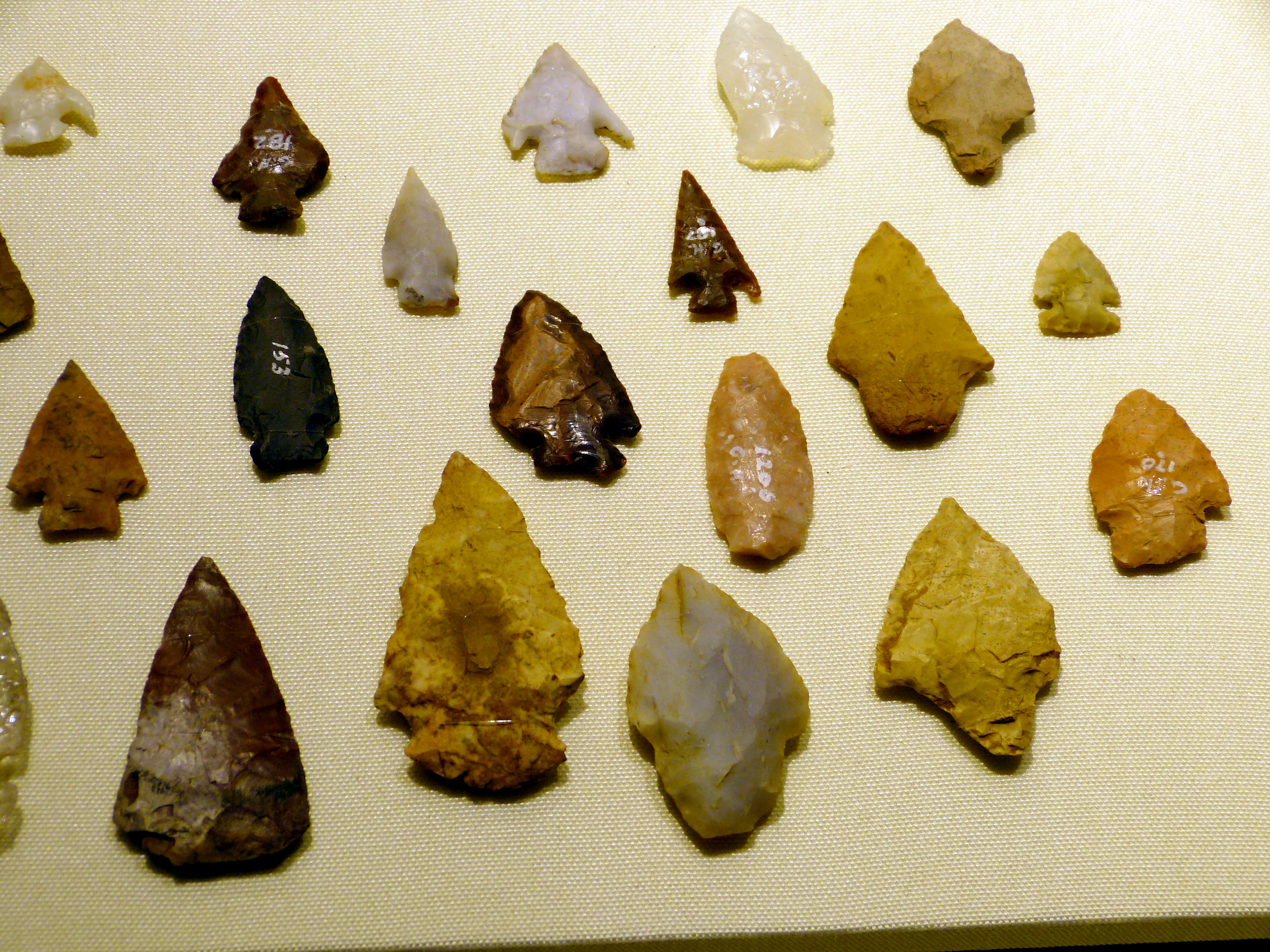
Pre-Columbian arrowheads on display at the museum. The museum houses a number of historical artifacts of the people of British Columbia.

The human history department aims to represent the cultural, social, and economic history of the peoples of BC. Collecting anthropological artifacts has been a practice of the Royal BC Museum since its founding in 1886. Currently, a significant number of artifacts from the human history department are being repatriated to First Nations groups. The Human History department is responsible for representing the material cultural history of BC.

==== Archaeology ====
This division of the Human History department houses over 192 000 artifacts. The Royal BC Museum holds the largest collection of First Nations archaeological material from BC.

==== Ethnology ====
The ethnology collection at the Royal BC Museum contains over 14 000 indigenous artifacts. These artifacts include both ceremonial and utilitarian objects and were collected from various First Nations groups around BC.

=== Modern history ===
The Modern History department is aimed at portraying BC's history through material culture. There are 165 000 artifacts in the collection ranging from silverware to textiles to furniture to items related to canneries, mines, and breweries. Notably, the collection includes a lion's head from the 1970s Vancouver Chinese Freemasons Athletic Club that exemplifies the traditional Hoshan style, as well as the Man Yuk Tong collection that preserves the authentic herbs, prescriptions, and miscellaneous implements used in the original Chinese Herbalist Shop.

=== Natural history ===
The Natural History department has been a part of the Royal BC Museum since 1886. The department includes curators, collection managers, and a mammal and bird preparator. The Natural History collections are divided into eight disciplines: Entomology, Botany, Mammalogy, Ornithology, Ichthyology, Invertebrate Zoology, Palaeontology, and Herpetology. This department develops the records representing the province's biodiversity by collecting or accepting donations each year; processing them into the collections; and making the specimens and records available to the general public, as well as to scientific and educational communities.

==== Palaeontology ====
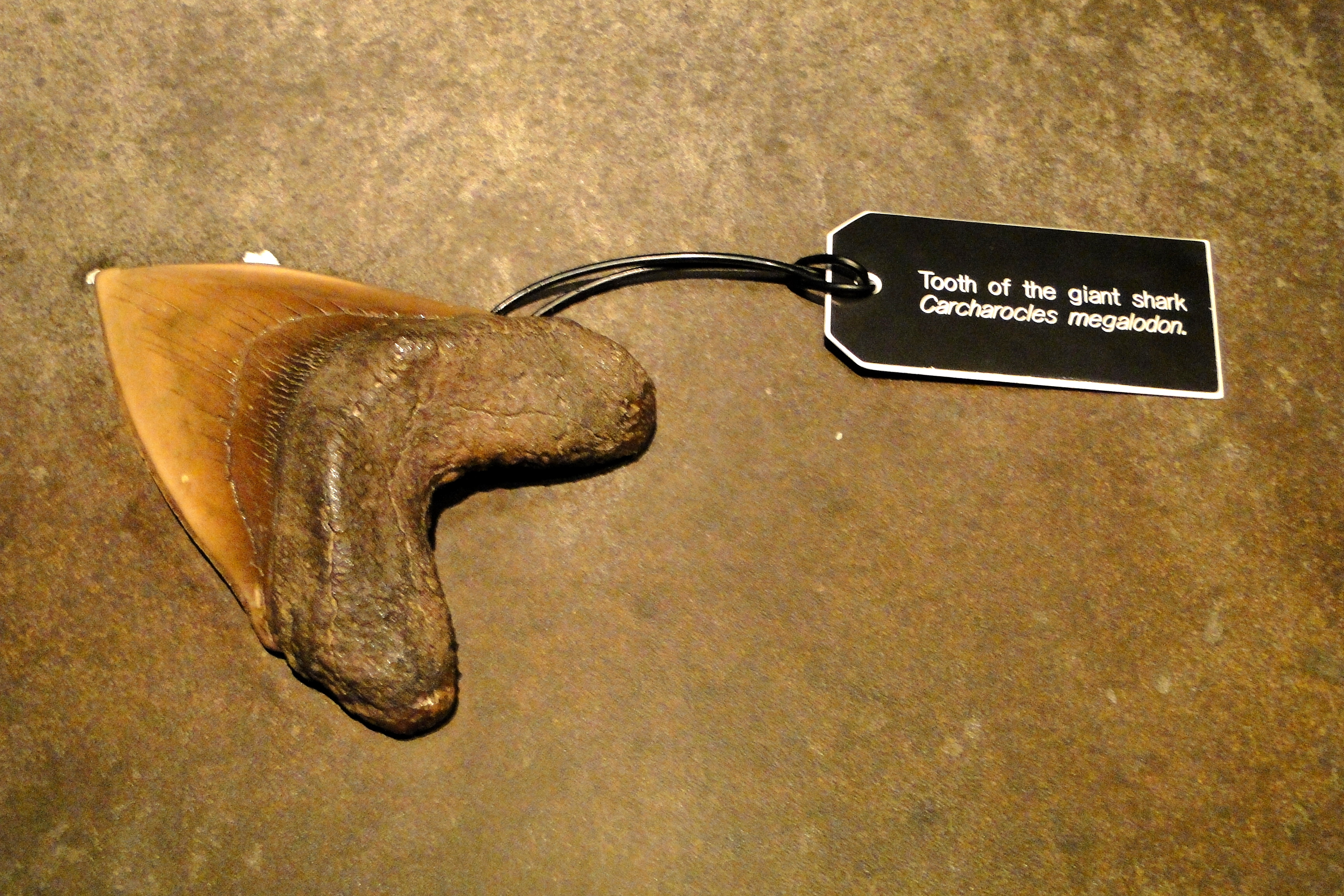
Tooth of a megalodon on display at the museum. The museum boasts a fossil collection of approximately 55,000 specimens.

The fossil collection at the Royal BC Museum boasts approximately 55 000 specimens. The collection integrates specimens from all over BC ranging from 600 million years old to 20 000 years old. The palaeontology discipline also includes rock specimens from various mines around BC.

==== Botany ====
The botany discipline centres on the various plants of BC and the collection includes over 200 000 specimens. Notably, the Royal BC Museum houses one of the oldest native plant gardens in western Canada (begun in 1967), where approximately 400 native species grow.

==== Invertebrate zoology ====
The invertebrate collection is largely focused on marine, freshwater, and terrestrial invertebrate species from BC (insects, arachnids, and their relatives are represented in the entomology discipline). The collection consists of approximately 65 000 lots of marine and freshwater invertebrates, including marine molluscs, echinoderms, crustaceans, and polychaetes. This discipline also hosts a smaller global collection of dried gastropods, chitons, and bivalves. Notable specimens include more than 250 “type” specimens, each one used in the original description of a particular species.

==== Entomology ====
The entomology discipline focuses on specimens of insects, arachnids, and their relatives. As of 2010, the entomology collection included approximately 245 000 accessioned specimens and another 150 000 specimens not yet accessioned. The majority of the specimens are collected from BC, although some specimens have been culled from international areas. This collection provides basic information for assessing the status of BC insects and other terrestrial arthropods. It is also used to construct species range maps, supply useful information on species life histories and habitat requirements, and identify unknown specimens.

==== Ichthyology ====
The ichthyology discipline is primarily dedicated to studying the fish of BC. The collection consists of approximately 14 000 specimens of marine and freshwater fish.

==== Herpetology ====
This discipline is concerned with amphibians and reptiles of BC. The herpetology collection consists of approximately 5000 lots from BC.

==== Ornithology ====
This discipline mainly consists of bird specimens from BC, with a distinct focus on common seabirds, waterfowl, raptors, grouse, common shorebirds, alcids, gulls, woodpeckers, and common passerines. The ornithology collection contains 19 335 study skins, 3027 skeletons, 2713 clutches of eggs, 375 nests and 43 fluid-preserved specimens.

==== Mammalogy ====
This discipline focuses on a collection of mammals, the majority of which are from BC. The collection includes 18 000 specimens, largely made up of skeletons.

== Conservation ==
The Conservation Services Department of the Royal BC Museum preserves the museum's artifacts, documents, and specimens. Conservators speak to interested groups, lecture, consult, advise, and work with students and interns from conservation programmes around the world. The department was established in 1966 and was the first conservation lab in western Canada, and one of the first facilities for artifact conservation in Canada. In the 1970s and 1980s, conservators and conservation scientists worked with the Haida people on the preservation of the poles at Ninstints. Since the discovery of the remains of Kwäday Dän Ts’inchi in 1999, conservators have been involved with the Champagne and Aishihik people in recovery, analysis, treatment and publication projects.

== Learning and education ==
The Learning and Visitor Experience initiative at the Royal BC Museum runs public programs, workshops, lectures, guided tours, and special events—all geared toward educating and engaging visitors. Roughly fifty school, family, and adult programs are scheduled per year. There are also annual events, including Remembrance Day commemorations, the Heritage Fair, and a Carol Along with the Carillon and other Christmas activities at Helmcken House.

=== Living landscapes ===
By 2002 the RBCM had initiated a successful and innovative province-wide research and public education program that explored human and natural influences on regional environments combining cultural heritage with natural heritage. The museum maintained a Living Landscapes website.

Living Landscapes was an award-winning, successful "regional outreach program involving intensive cooperation with other museums, First Nations, educators, naturalists, and other agencies." Its goal was "to encourage and facilitate the exploration and appreciation of the human and natural history of British Columbia from regional perspectives," and it focused on "particular regions of B.C. and integrating stories and research locally generated with both research knowledge and descriptive information from the collections and curatorial staff at the Royal British Columbia Museum."

In 2000 the focus of Living Landscapes was on the Upper Fraser Basin, a "vast area extending across most of south-central British Columbia including the Fraser River valley upstream from Big Bar Creek, as well as it is tributary drainages such as the Chilcotin, Quesnel, and Nechako Rivers." During 2001–2002 RBCM hosted five Upper Fraser Basin communities including, Valemount, British Columbia, Burns Lake, Williams Lake, Quesnel and Prince George attended by approximately 4,500 people. Visitors met and interacted with local Living Landscapes researchers and Victoria-based RBCM curators. The events featured exhibits from the RBCM's permanent collections as well as "illustrated talks and demonstrations on a variety of topics by local and museum experts."

Initially, Living Landscapes focused on "in-field programming has been the northern, central and southern interior of British Columbia." In March 2006, when they had successfully completed the Northwest region, they discontinued the in-field programming.

== Exhibition arts ==
The Exhibition Arts department began in the early 1970s, and now construct all of the Royal BC Museum exhibits in-house. The department is responsible for maintaining the permanent galleries and constructing the exhibitions, as well as setting them up and taking them down. The Exhibition Arts department is made up of specialists with a variety of skill sets, including carpenters, blacksmiths, metal workers, welders, and people who specialize in casting, finishing, jewellery, multimedia, lighting, large format printing, and software and hardware computation.

== Affiliations ==
The museum is affiliated with: CMA, CHIN, and Virtual Museum of Canada.

== Publishing and publications ==
The RBCM began publishing in 1891, when then-curator John Fannin published a Check List of British Columbia Birds. The museum has produced thousands of books, papers, pamphlets and other documents about its collections, research and activities since that time. Beginning in 1993, the RBCM distributes through major Canadian distributors, including the University of British Columbia Press and Heritage Distributors. The museum publishes around four titles per year and has more than forty books in print.

Recent titles include:

- Arima, Eugene and Alan Hoover. The Whaling People of the West Coast of Vancouver Island and Cape Flattery . Victoria: RBCM, November 2011.
- Austin, William C, and Philip Lambert. Brittle Stars, Sea Urchins and Feather Stars of British Columbia, Southeast Alaska and Puget Sound. Victoria: RBCM, 2007.
- Beal, Alison M, David F. Hatler, and David W. Nagorsen. Carnivores of British Columbia. Victoria: RBCM, October 2008.
- Black, Martha. Out of the Mist: Treasures of the Nuu-chah-nulth Chiefs. Victoria: RBCM, 1999.
- Bridge, Kathryn. New Perspectives on the Gold Rush. Victoria: Royal BC Museum, 2015.
- Brayshaw, T. Christopher. Catkin-Bearing Plants of British Columbia. Victoria: RBCM, 1996.
- Brayshaw, T. Christopher. Plant Collecting for the Amateur. Victoria: RBCM, 1996.
- Brayshaw, T. Christopher. Pondweeds and Bur-reeds and Their Relatives of British Columbia Aquatic Families of Monocotyledons. Victoria: RBCM, 2000.
- Brayshaw, T. Christopher. Trees and Shrubs of British Columbia. Victoria: RBCM, 1996.
- Cannings, Robert A. Introducing the Dragonflies of British Columbia and the Yukon. Victoria: RBCM, 2002.
- Cannings, Robert A. The Systematics of Lasiopogon (Diptera: Asilidae). Victoria: RBCM, 2002.
- Carr, Emily. Sister and I from Victoria to London. Victoria: RBCM, April 2011.
- Carr, Emily. Wild Flowers. Victoria: RBCM, 2006.
- Copley, Claudia and Ann Nightingale, Eds. Nature Guide to the Victoria Region . Victoria: RBCM and the Victoria Natural History Society, October 2012.
- Corley-Smith, Peter. The Ring of Time: The Story of the British Columbia Provincial Museum. Victoria: RBCM, 1985.
- Corley-Smith, Peter. White Bears and Other Curiosities: The First 100 Years of the Royal British Columbia Museum. Victoria: RBCM, 1989. Print.
- Duff, Wilson, ed. Histories, Territories and Laws of the Kitwancool. Victoria: RBCM, 1959.
- Duff, Wilson. The Indian History of British Columbia: The Impact of the White Man. Victoria: RBCM, 1997.
- Ford, John K. B. Marine Mammals of British Columbia. Victoria: Royal BC Museum, 2014.
- Forsyth, Robert G. Land Snails of British Columbia. Victoria: RBCM, 2004.
- Graham-Bell, Margaret. Preventive Conservation: A Manual. Victoria: BCMA, 1983. (2nd ed. 1986)
- Green, David M, Patrick T. Gregory, and Brent M. Matsuda. Amphibians and Reptiles of British Columbia. Victoria: RBCM, 2006.
- Griffin, Robert and Nancy Oke. Feeding the Family: 100 Years of Food and Drink in Victoria. Victoria: RBCM, May 2011.
- Guppy, Crispin S and Jon H. Shepard. Butterflies of British Columbia. Victoria: RBCM, 2001.
- Hebda, Richard J. and Nancy J. Turner. Saanich Ethnobotany : Culturally Important Plants of the WSÁNEC People. Victoria: RBCM, October 2012 .
- Hoover, Alan L, Peter L. Macnair, and Kevin Neary. The Legacy Tradition and Innovation in Northwest Coast Indian Art. Victoria: RBCM, 2007.
- Hoover, Alan L. Nuu-chah-nulth Voices, Histories, Objects & Journeys. Victoria: RBCM, 2000.
- Hoover, Alan L and Peter L. Macnair. The Magic Leaves: A History of Haida Argillite Carving. Victoria: RBCM, 2002.
- Johnstone, Bill. Coal Dust In My Blood: The Autobiography of a Coal Miner. Victoria: RBCM, 2002.
- Keddie, Grant. Songhees Pictorial: A History of the Songhees People as Seen by Outsiders (1790–1912). Victoria: RBCM, 2003.
- Lambert, Philip. Sea Cucumbers of British Columbia, Southeast Alaska and Puget Sound. Victoria: RBCM, 1997.
- Lambert, Philip. Sea Stars of British Columbia, Southeast Alaska and Puget Sound. Victoria: RBCM, 2000.
- Lohman, Jack. Museums at the Crossroads? Essays on Cultural Institutions in a Time of Change. Victoria: Royal BC Museum, 2013.
- Lohman, Jack. Treasures of the Royal BC Museum and Archives. Victoria: Royal BC Museum, 2015.
- Marc, Jacques. Pacific Coast Ship China. Victoria: RBCM, 2009.
- Nagorsen, David W. Opossums, Shrews and Moles of British Columbia. Victoria: RBCM, 1996.
- Nagorsen, David W. Rodents & Lagomorphs of British Columbia. Victoria: RBCM, 2005.
- Rajala, Richard A. Up-Coast Forests and Industry on British Columbia’s North Coast, 1870–2005. Victoria: RBCM, 2006.
- Savard, Dan. Images from the Likeness House. Victoria: RBCM, May 2010.
- Sherwood, Jay. Furrows in the Sky : The Adventures of Gerry Andrews . Victoria: RBCM, April 2012.
- Sherwood, Jay. Return to Northern British Columbia: A Photojournal of Frank Swannell, 1929–39. Victoria: RBCM, September 2010.
- Sherwood, Jay. Surveying Central British Columbia A Photojournal of Frank Swannell, 1920 – 28. Victoria: RBCM, 2007.
- Truscott, Gerald. Free Spirit Stories of You, Me and BC. Victoria: RBCM, 2008.
- Turner, Nancy J. Food Plants of Coastal First People. Victoria: RBCM, 1995.
- Turner, Nancy J. Food Plants of Interior First Peoples. Victoria: RBCM, 1997.
- Turner, Nancy J. Plant Technology of First Peoples in British Columbia. Victoria: RBCM, 1998.
- Van Tol, Alex. Aliens Among Us: Invasive Animals and Plants in British Columbia. Victoria: Royal BC Museum, 2015.
- Ward, Phillip R. Keeping the Past Alive. Victoria: Friends of the BCPM, 1974.
- Ward, Phillip R. Getting the Bugs Out. Victoria, Friends of the BCPM, 1976.
- Ward, Philip R. In Support of Difficult Shapes. Victoria: Friends of the BCPM, 1978.
- White, Bob. Bannock and Beans: A Cowboy's Account of the Bedaux Expedition. Victoria: RBCM, 2009.
- Wilson, Colleen. Tales From the Attic: Practical Advice on Preserving Heirlooms and Collectibles. Victoria: RBCM, 2002.

== See also ==
- List of Canadian organizations with royal patronage
