= Plaza Canadá (Buenos Aires) =

Square in Buenos Aires, Argentina

- City square
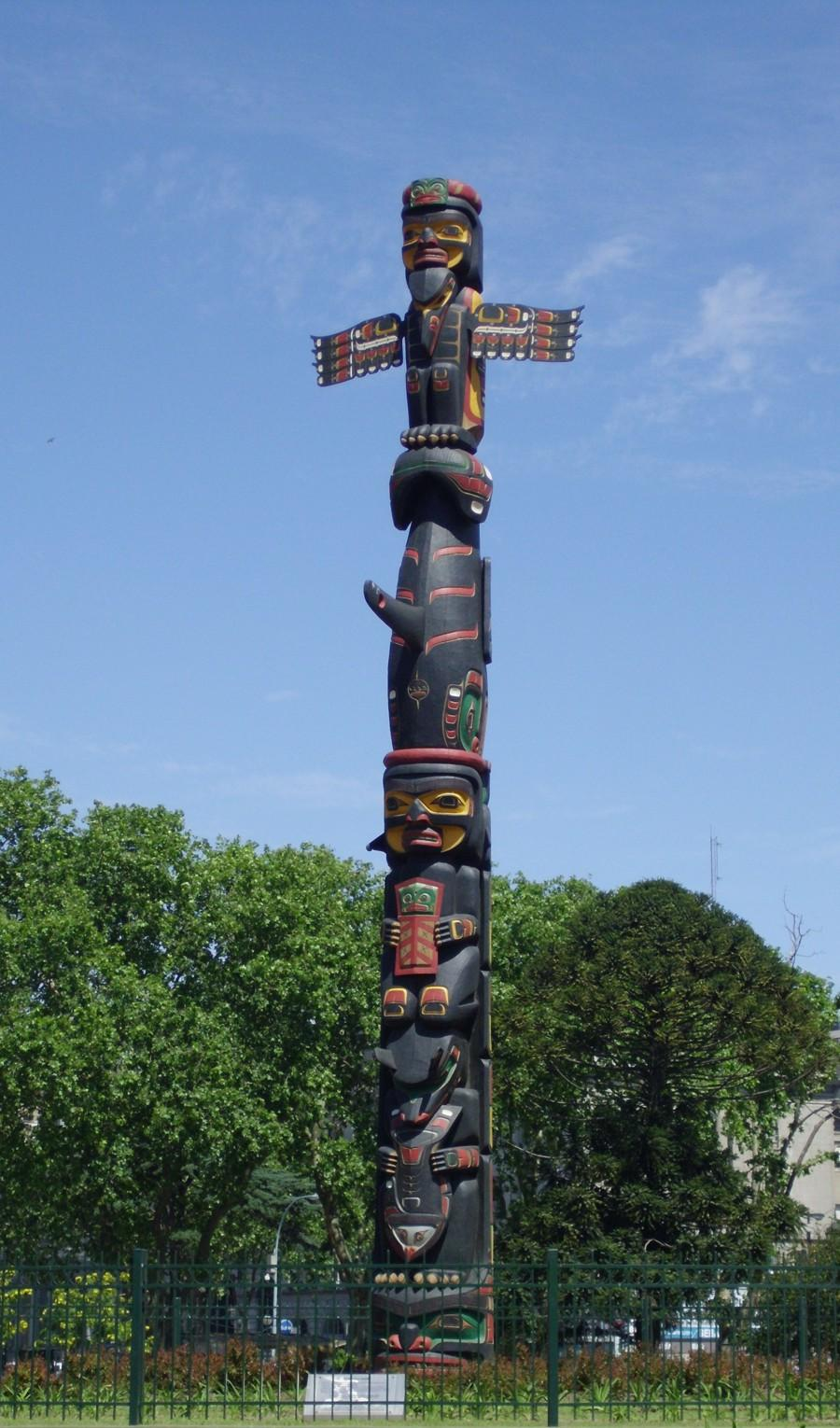
- Plaza Canadá totem pole
- Opened: 1 July 1961
- Location: Retiro; Buenos Aires, Argentina
- Interactive map of Plaza Canadá
- Coordinates: 34°35′23.9″S 58°22′19.2″W

Plaza Canadá (English: Canada Square) is a public square in the Retiro neighbourhood of Buenos Aires, Argentina located within the streets of Maipú, Antártida Argentina, San Martin, and Dr. José María Ramos Mejía.

== History ==
Located in front of Retiro railway station, Plaza Canadá was conceived by the Argentina-Canada Cultural Institute and was dedicated in July 1961. A carved totem pole that was donated by the Canadian government stands in the center of the plaza. The totem pole sits as a tribute to the shared Indigenous heritages found in both Canada and Argentina.

== Canadian totem ==
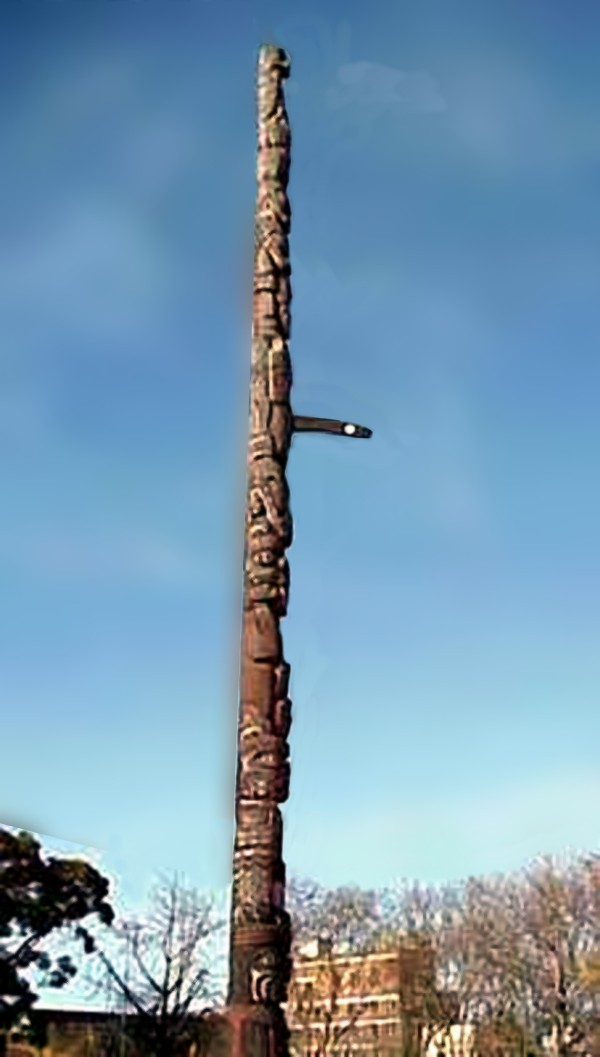
Original totem pole in 2006

After the plaza was named, Canadian Ambassador Richard Plant Bower worked to arrange the delivery of a totem pole from Canada to Buenos Aires. In 1963, Kwakiutl carvers Henry Hunt and his son Tony Hunt Sr. were commissioned by Ambassador Bower to carve a 20-metre (66 ft) totem pole for the plaza. Carved from a 2,000-year old British Columbia red cedar, the totem pole depicted an eagle, a killer whale, a sea lion, a beaver, and a cannibal bird called a hok hok. After being shipped to Buenos Aires, the pole was erected in Plaza Canadá in May 1964.

By the early 2000s, the totem pole had severely deteriorated, and in 2008 Hernán Lombardi, the Minister of Culture for the City of Buenos Aires, announced that restoration project would be started for the totem pole. The totem pole was cut down from its stand in the plaza and cut into pieces to facilitate repair. However, by the time restoration efforts took place, the totem pole had deteriorated beyond repair leading the city government to request a new totem pole.

In 2011, the Argentine Embassy to Canada sought for a carver from the Hunt family to carve the new totem pole. Stanley C. Hunt, a son of Henry Hunt, was commissioned to carve the new 12.9-metre (42 ft) totem pole. The new totem pole was carved from a 1,500-year old five-ton British Columbia red cedar and depicts a double-headed serpent called a sisiutl, a bear holding a halibut, a chief holding a copper shield, a killer whale, and a chief holding the creator raven. On August 12, 2012, the new totem pole was placed in Plaza Canadá and was dedicated with an indigenous ceremonial dance with indigenous groups from both nations that was attended by the Minister of Culture Hernán Lombardi, the Minister of Environment and Public Space Diego Santilli, and the Canadian Ambassador to Argentina Gwyneth Kutz. This new totem pole was featured on the third episode of The Amazing Race Canada 3 in 2015.

== See also ==
- Argentina–Canada relations
