= Richard Hunt (artist) =

Kwakwaka'wakw carver

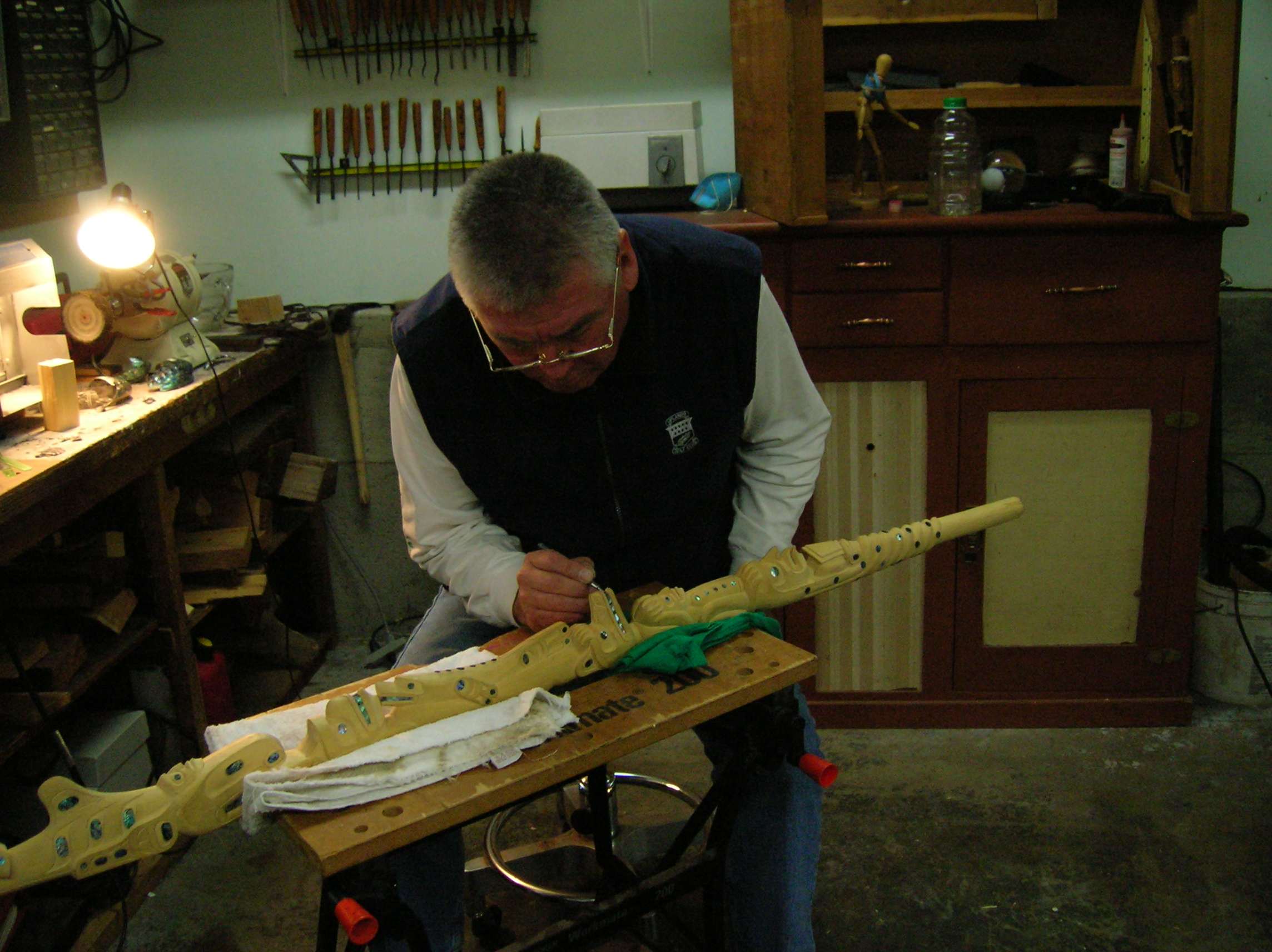
- Born: 1951 (age 74–75); Alert Bay, British Columbia, Canada
- Known for: Sculptor
- Awards: Order of Canada, Order of British Columbia, honorary doctorate from the University of Victoria

Richard Hunt CM OBC RCA (born 1951, Kwakwaka'wakw) is a Canadian First Nations artist from coastal British Columbia.

== Biography ==
Hunt was born at Alert Bay, B.C., but has lived most of his life in Victoria, B.C. On his father's side, he is a descendant of the renowned Native ethnologist George Hunt. He began carving at the age of thirteen. In 1973 he began working with his father Henry Hunt at Thunderbird Park at the British Columbia Provincial Museum in Victoria.

Richard's brothers Tony Hunt and Stanley C. Hunt are also carvers.

Richard Hunt designed the medals for the Pan Pacific Swimming Championships held August 17–21, 2006 at Saanich Commonwealth Place. Among his other projects, he repainted the totem pole at Rideau Hall, which his grandfather Mungo Martin had given to Governor General Lord Alexander in 1946.

== Honors ==
In 1991, Hunt was inducted into the Order of British Columbia. He is also a member of the Order of Canada.

He received an honorary doctorate from the University of Victoria in 2004. He was made a member of the Royal Canadian Academy of Arts.
