= Kwanusila =

Totem pole in Chicago, Illinois, U.S.

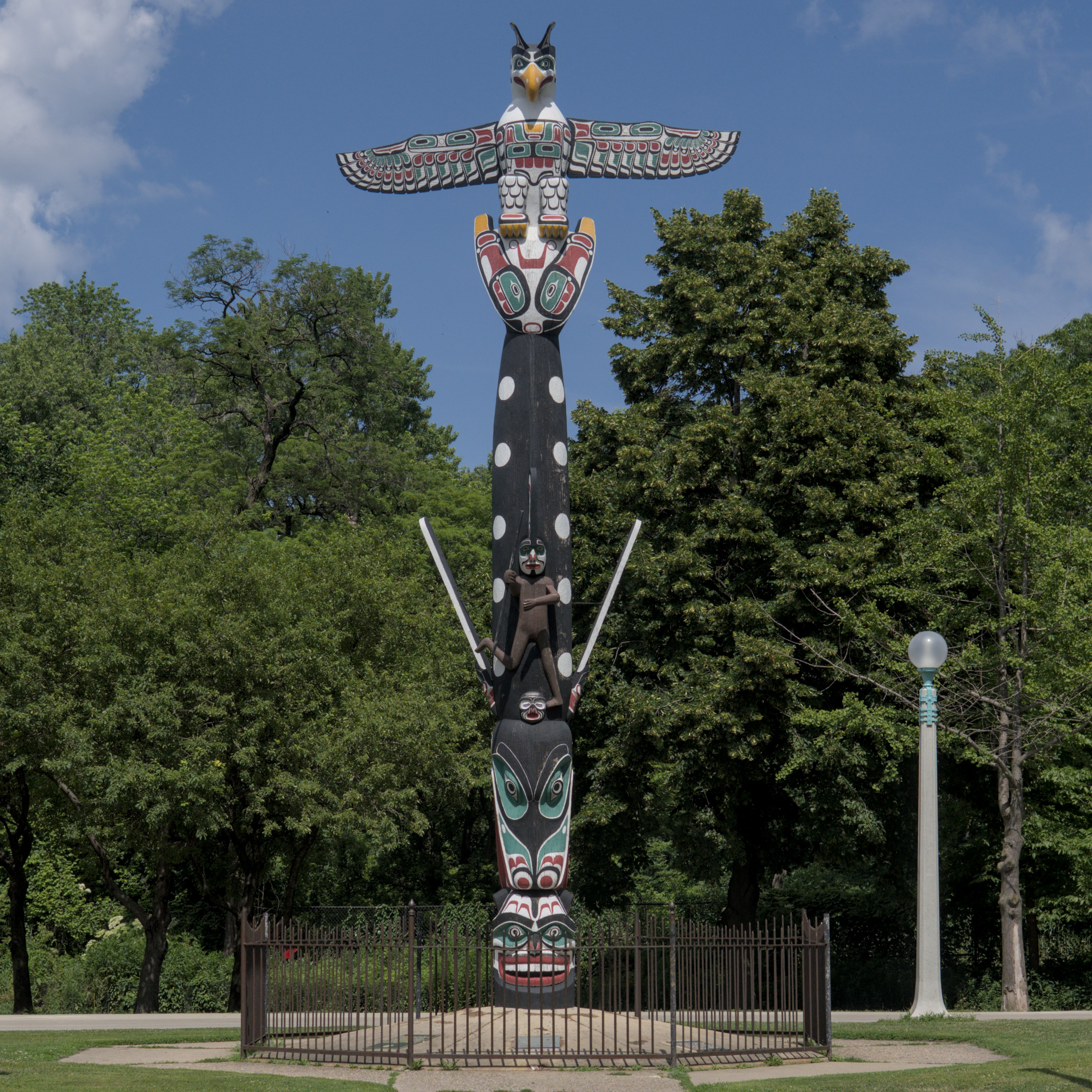
- Kwanusila in 2025

- Location within Chicago metropolitan area Location within Illinois
- Artist: Tony Hunt
- Completion date: 1986
- Medium: Wood
- Dimensions: 12.2 meters (40 feet)
- Location: Chicago; 41°56′56.3″N 87°38′32.8″W
- Owner: Tony Hunt

Kwanusila is a 12.2 meter (40 foot) tall totem pole carved from red cedar. It stands in Lincoln Park at Addison Street just east of Lake Shore Drive in the Lake View neighborhood of Chicago, Illinois. The colorfully painted totems include a grimacing sea monster at the bottom, a man riding a whale above it, and Kwanusila the Thunderbird on top.

== History ==
Its sculptor was Tony Hunt, the chief of the Kwagu'ł tribe in British Columbia, as a 1986 replacement for the totem pole that stood at the site since 1929. That pole was carved in 1893 for the World's Columbian Exposition in Chicago by George Hunt (Tlingit), an ethnologist from Alaska who assisted Franz Boas at the fair and served also as a linguist and interpreter. He was Tony Hunt's direct ancestor.

The first Hunt totem pole was purchased after the fair by cheese baron James L. Kraft, the founder of Kraft Foods and later donated to the city of Chicago. It was placed in the park in 1929. It suffered from poor maintenance, weathering and vandalism over the years, and was sent to the Museum of Anthropology at the University of British Columbia in 1985 for study and conservation.

== See also ==
- List of public art in Chicago
