= Henry Hunt (artist) =

Kwakwakaʼwakw woodcarver, artist (1923–1985)

- Born: 16 October 1923; Fort Rupert, British Columbia, Canada
- Died: 13 March 1985 (aged 61); Victoria, British Columbia, Canada
- Occupation: Woodcarver
- Known for: Totem pole carving
- Style: Kwakwakaʼwakw (Kwakiutl)
- Spouse: Helen Martin
- Relatives: George Hunt
- Family: Henry Hunt, Jr.; Shirley Ford; Tony Hunt; Richard Hunt; Stanley C. Hunt

Henry Hunt (16 October 1923 – 13 March 1985) was a First Nations woodcarver and artist from the Kwakwakaʼwakw (formerly "Kwakiutl") people of coastal British Columbia. He carved a number of totem poles which are on public display in Canada and internationally.

== Early life ==
He was born in 1923 in the Kwakwakaʼwakw community of Fort Rupert, B.C. He was a descendant of the renowned ethnologist George Hunt. In 1954 he moved to Victoria and became Martin's chief assistant in the Thunderbird Park carving program.

Hunt was originally a logger and fishermen before he took up wood carving professionally. In 1939 he married Helen Martin, the adopted daughter of Kwakwakaʼwakw artist Mungo Martin. Their children were the artists Henry Jr., Shirley Ford, Tony Hunt, Richard Hunt, and Stanley C. Hunt.

== Career ==
In 1954 Hunt went to work for his father-in-law in Victoria. Hunt took the post of Martin's chief assistant in the Thunderbird Park at the British Columbia Provincial Museum. At Thunderbird Park, Hunt studied traditional wood carving under Mungo Martin and Arthur Shaughnessy. He also worked in the museum's collections, helping to restore and preserve Aboriginal art. Mungo Martin died in 1962 and Hunt succeeded him as the park's Master Carver.

Henry Hunt trained his sons, Tony, Stanley and Richard, in the art of carving; all of them went on to establish careers as carvers. Tony became chief assistant carver to his father and together they created a series of important totem poles and other carvings. Henry Hunt remained at the museum for over 20 years until he retired in 1974, and his son Richard took over as Master Carver in the Thunderbird Park carving program.

== Works ==
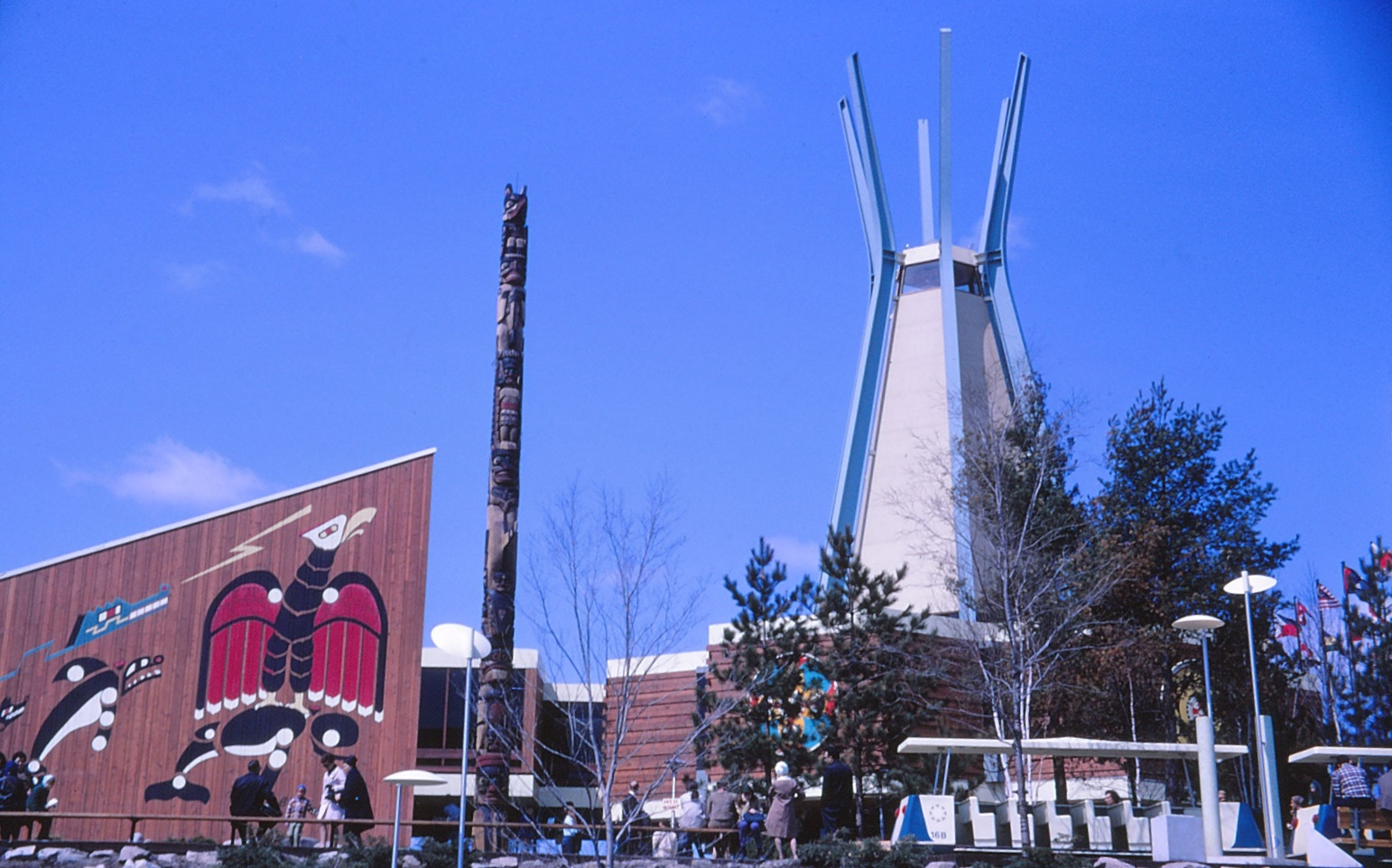
Hunt's totem pole at the Expo67 "Indians of Canada" Pavilion

Henry Hunt followed the Kwakwakaʼwakw carving tradition, using minimum paint, deep cuts with traditional tools.

A number of Hunt's works can be seen at locations around Canada. Many of his totem poles and other ornamental objects can be seen on display at the Thunderbird Park in Victoria. He produced a totem pole for the Indians of Canada Pavilion at Expo67 in Montreal, and a pole for the Totem Marina at Shuswap Lake, BC.

A noted work by Henry and Richard Hunt is a 32-foot (9.8 m) memorial pole which was erected in 1970 in memory of Mungo Martin at Alert Bay. This pole is reputedly the world's tallest totem pole, standing at 9.75 metres (32.0 ft); the previous claim to the title was a pole carved by Henry Hunt, Mungo and David Martin standing at Beacon Hill Park in Victoria, depicting the legend of Geeksen, the first man in Kwakwakaʼwakw mythology. Another of Hunt's poles stands at the Swartz Bay ferry terminal; this pole depicts the Kwakwakaʼwakw mythological figures of Grizzly Bear and the Whale, and was awarded first prize in the Route of the Totems contest.

Other works by Hunt can be seen in Victoria, at Victoria Harbour and in the entrance of the Royal British Columbia Museum in Victoria; at the Maritime Museum of British Columbia in Vancouver, BC; at the Museum of Anthropology at UBC, Vancouver; and in Confederation Park, Ottawa, ON.

Hunt produced many smaller works including small presentation poles (approximately 45 cm long) which were presented as gifts to visiting heads of state and dignitaries; recipients have included prime minister Lester Pearson, US President Lyndon B. Johnson and Queen Elizabeth II.

Several of his works have been exhibited internationally. Henry Hunt totem poles are on display in the Plaza Canadá, Buenos Aires, Argentina, and in the town of Berkhamsted, England.

Works

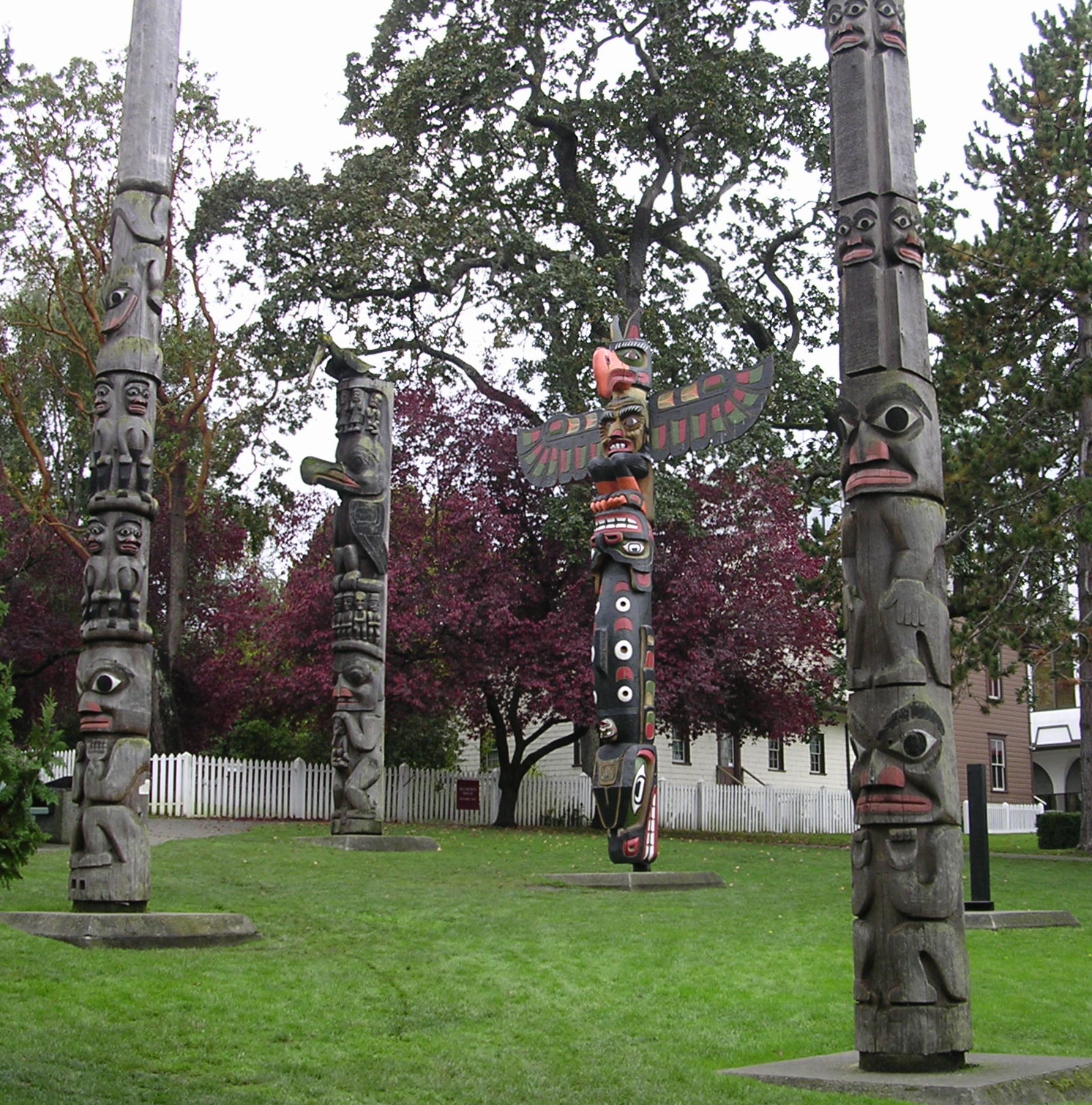
Totem poles outside the Royal BC Museum in Victoria

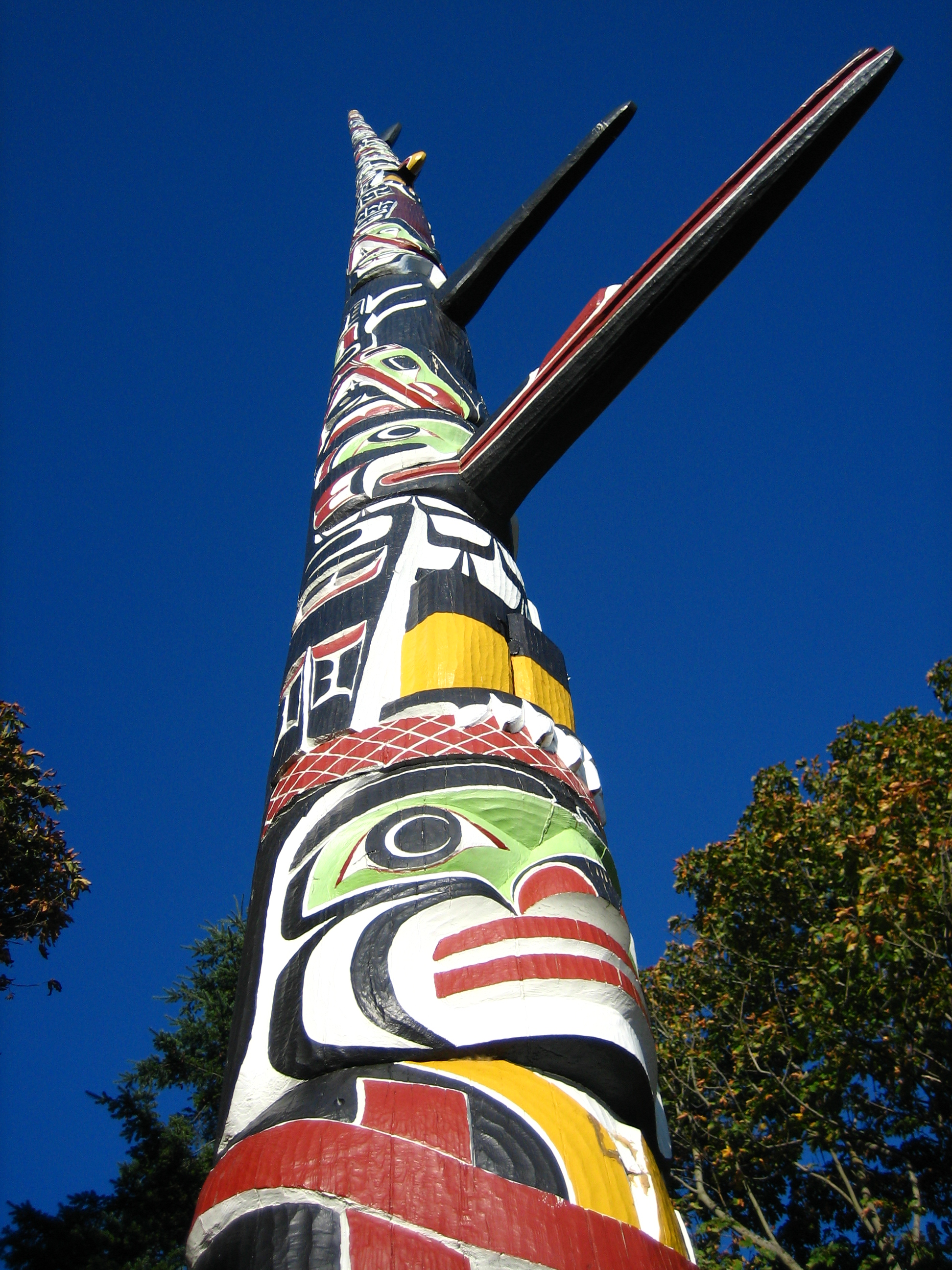
Beacon Hill Park Story Pole, Victoria

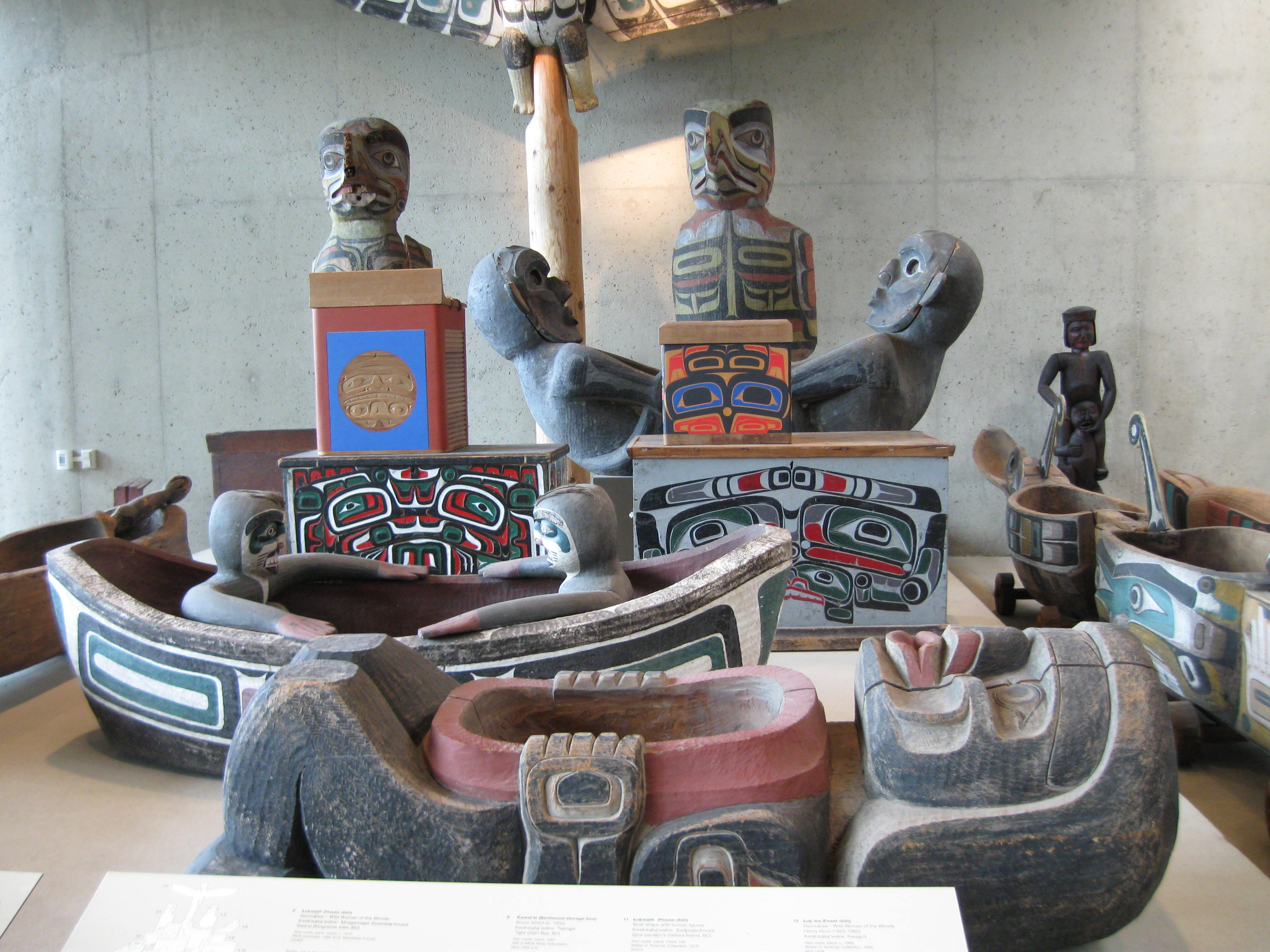
Feast dish in the shape of Dzunukwa, Museum of Anthropology at UBC, Vancouver

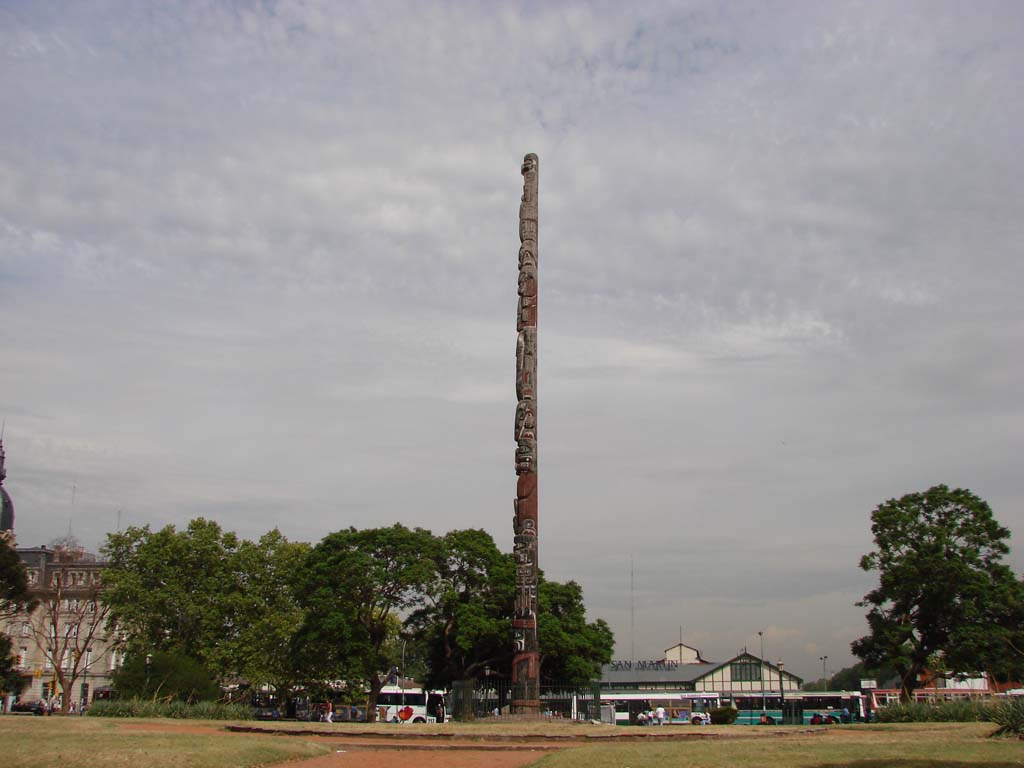
Hok hok totem, Plaza Canadá, Buenos Aires, Argentina

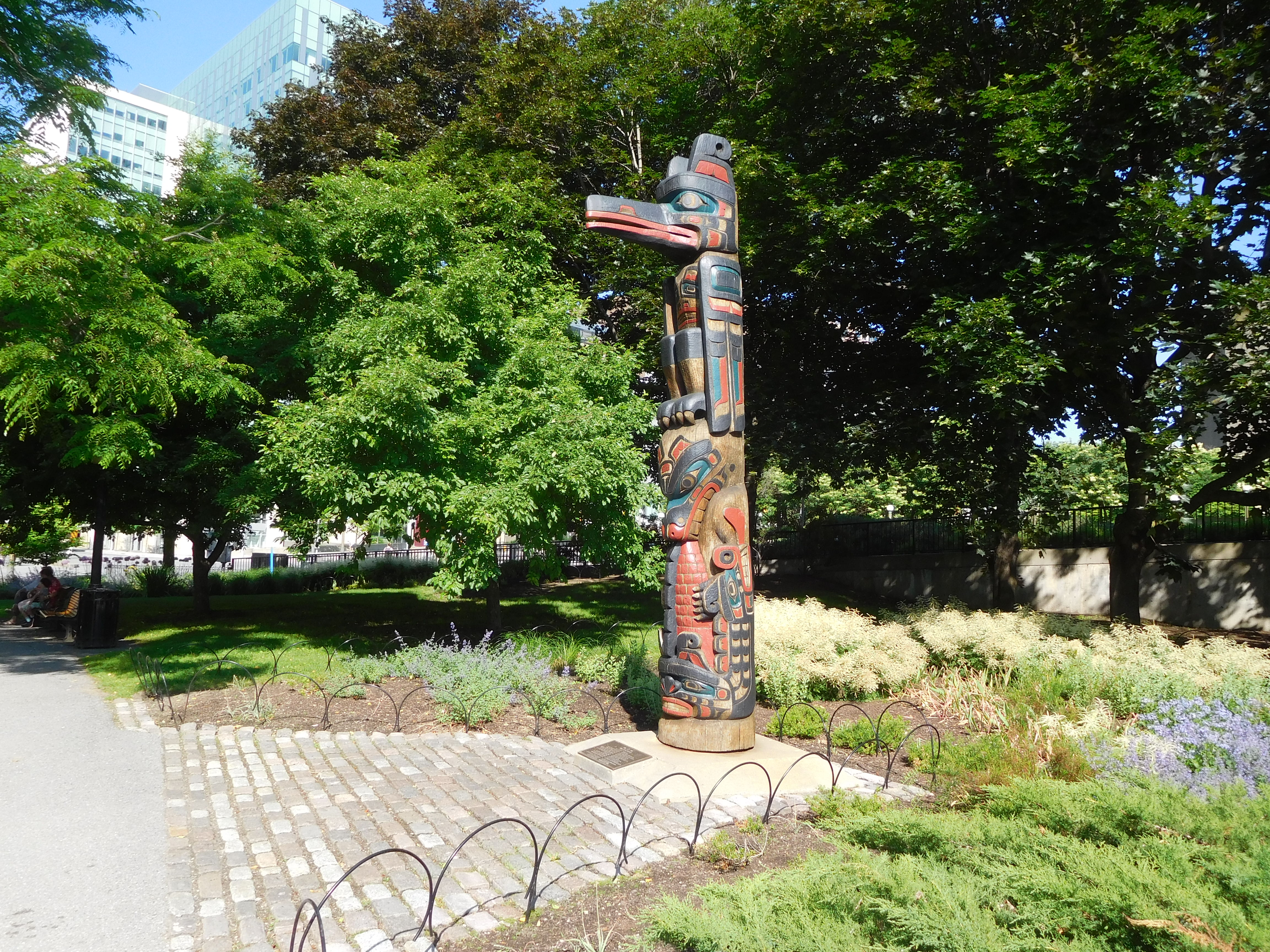
Confederation Park, Ottawa

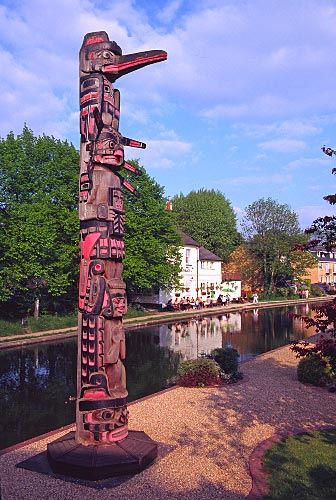
Totem pole in Berkhamsted, UK

== Death ==
Henry Hunt died on 13 March 1985 in Victoria.

== Bibliography ==
- Hunt, Ross. (2007). "The Hunt Family's Trip to West Germany to Attend the Bundesgarten Show." Anthropology News, vol. 48, no. 2, pp. 20–21.
- Hawthorn, Audrey. (1988). Kwakiutl Art. University of Washington Press. ISBN 0-88894-612-0.
- Macnair, Peter L., Alan L. Hoover, and Kevin Neary. (1984). The Legacy: Tradition and Innovation in Northwest Coast Indian Art. Vancouver, B.C.: Douglas & McIntyre.
- Stewart, Hilary (2009). Looking at Totem Poles. D & M Publishers. p. 94. ISBN 978-1-926706-35-1.
