= Argentina–Canada relations =

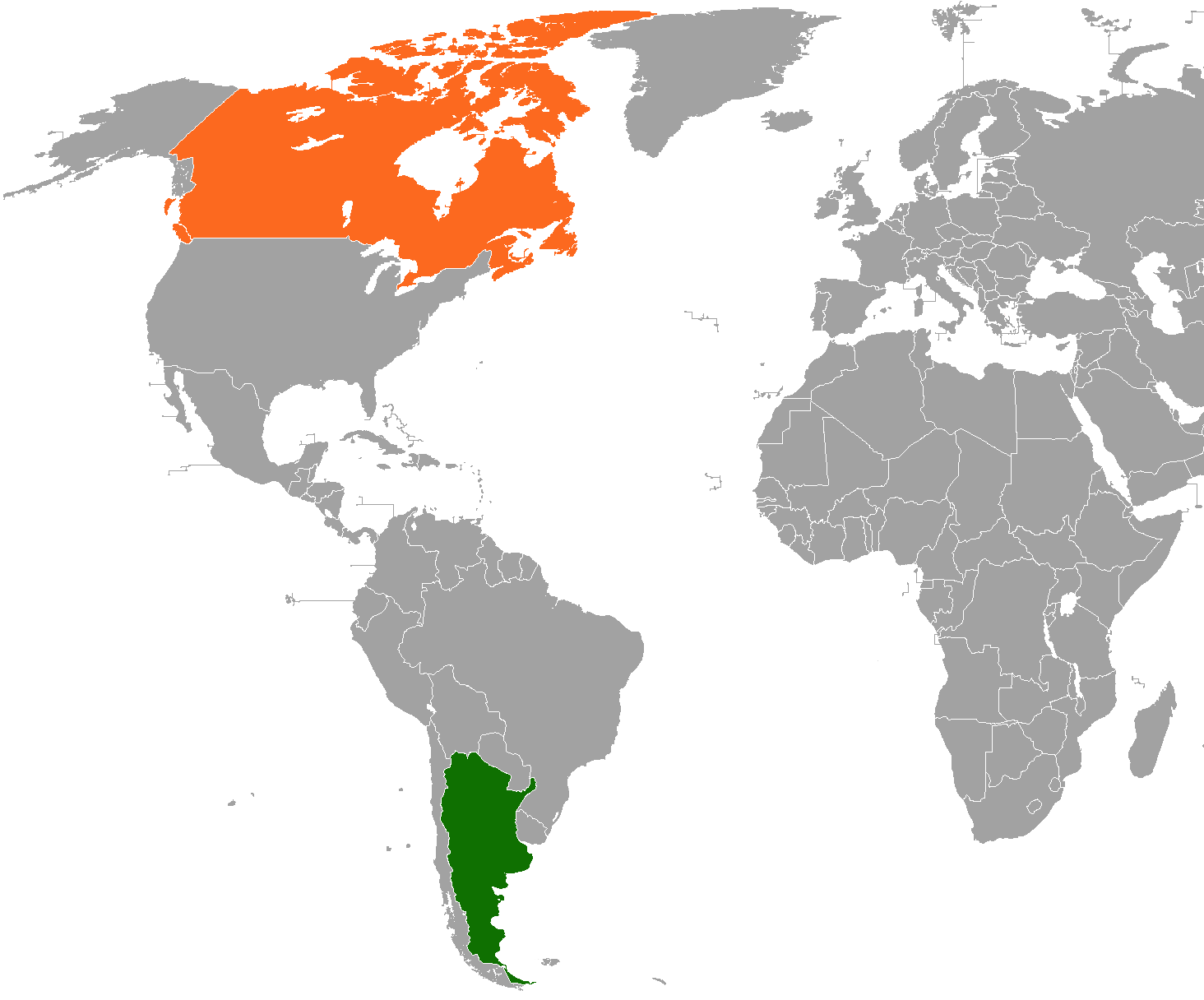

- Argentina: Canada

Bilateral relations between the Argentine Republic and Canada have existed for over a century. Both nations are members of the Cairns Group, G20, Organization of American States and the United Nations.

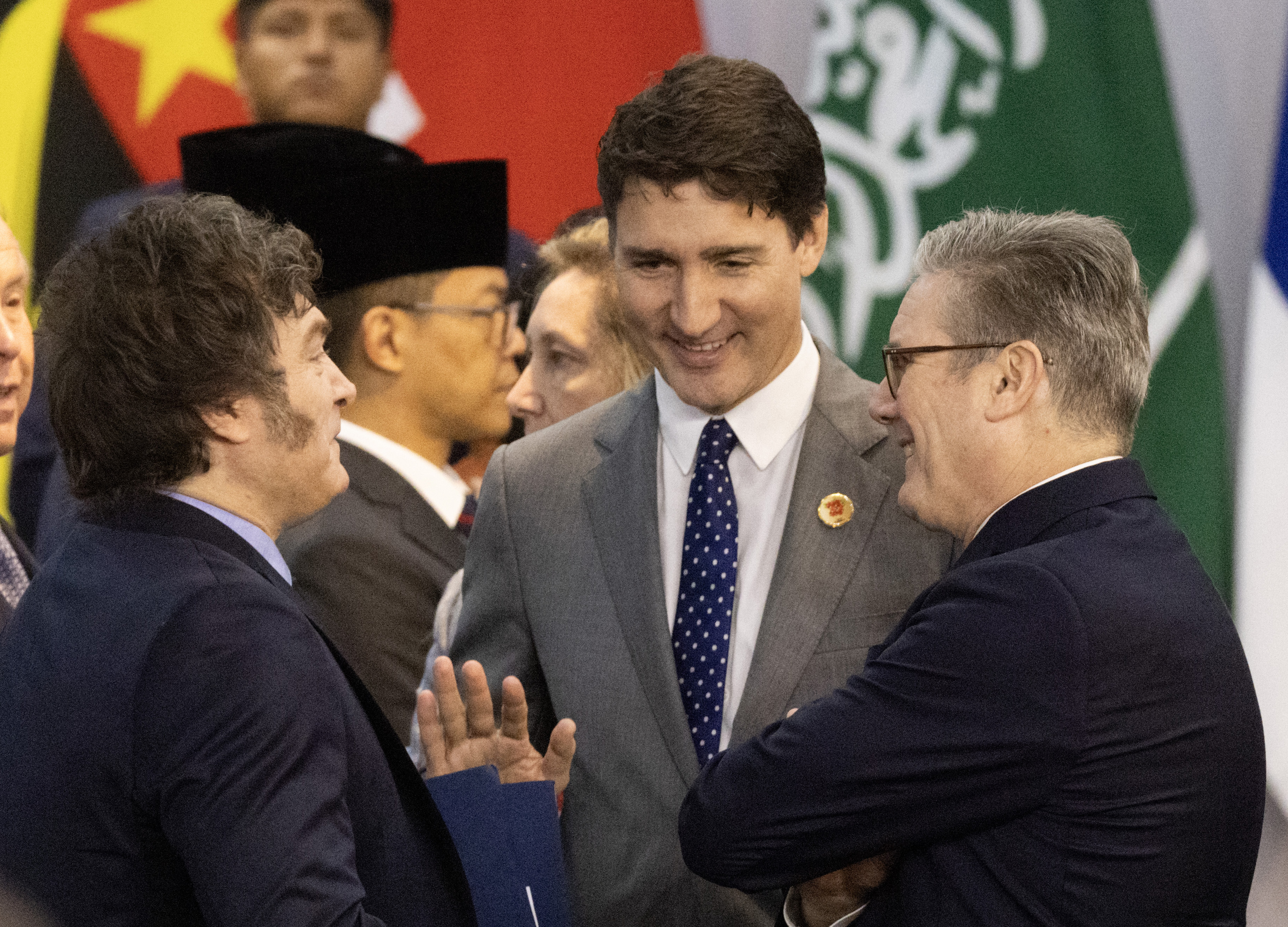
Argentine President Javier Milei with Canadian Prime Minister Justin Trudeau and British Prime Minister Keir Starmer at the 2024 G20 summit in Rio de Janeiro

== History ==
Relations between Argentina and Canada date back to 1867, when the Canadian government carried out its first commercial mission to Argentina and other countries in the region. In 1911, Canada opened its first South American trade office in Buenos Aires. In 1940 both nations formally established diplomatic relations. In 1945, Canada opened its first resident embassy in Buenos Aires.

In November 1961, President Arturo Frondizi became the first Argentine head of state to visit Canada. During his visit, President Frondizi met with Prime Minister John Diefenbaker. In 1968, Canadian foreign minister Mitchell Sharp paid a visit to Argentina and met with President Juan Carlos Onganía. In 1976, Argentina entered into a Military dictatorship. In 1978, the first Aerolíneas Argentinas flight was made between Buenos Aires and Montreal.

In April 1982, the Falklands War began between Argentina and the United Kingdom. During the war, Canada remained neutral, however, Canada withdrew its Ambassador from Buenos Aires. The decision to remain neutral by Prime Minister Pierre Trudeau was to distance Canadian foreign policy, economics, and military commitments from those of both the United States and the United Kingdom.

In 1994, Argentine President Carlos Menem paid a visit to Canada. In 1995, Prime Minister Jean Chrétien became the first Canadian head-of-government to visit Argentina. In recent years, both nations have jointly engaged in reconstruction and peacekeeping operations in Haiti and have collaborated as part of the Group of Friends of Haiti, as well as through the United Nations Stabilisation Mission in Haiti (MINUSTAH).

In 2013, Canada sent election observers during the Falkland Islands sovereignty referendum. Canada's official position is that the Falkland Islanders should decide their own destiny.

In November 2016, Canadian prime minister Justin Trudeau paid an official visit to Argentina and met with President Mauricio Macri. During his visit, both nations marked the 75th anniversary of bilateral relations. Both leaders also discussed the re-establishment of the annual Argentina-Canada bilateral human rights consultations; maintaining an ongoing dialogue on deepening the Canada-Mercosur trade and investment relationship; enhancing efforts to address climate change through the full and effective implementation of the Paris Agreement, and strengthen bilateral and multilateral cooperation on disarmament, non-proliferation, and the peaceful use of nuclear energy. Both countries committed to resuming their nuclear regulatory cooperation and re-establishing bilateral nuclear consultations pursuant to the Canada-Argentina Nuclear Cooperation Agreement.

The Canadian government invited Argentina to the G7. President Mauricio Macri and other officials attended the summit.

In November 2018, Prime Minister Trudeau visited Argentina for a second time to attend the G20 Buenos Aires summit.

== High-level visits ==
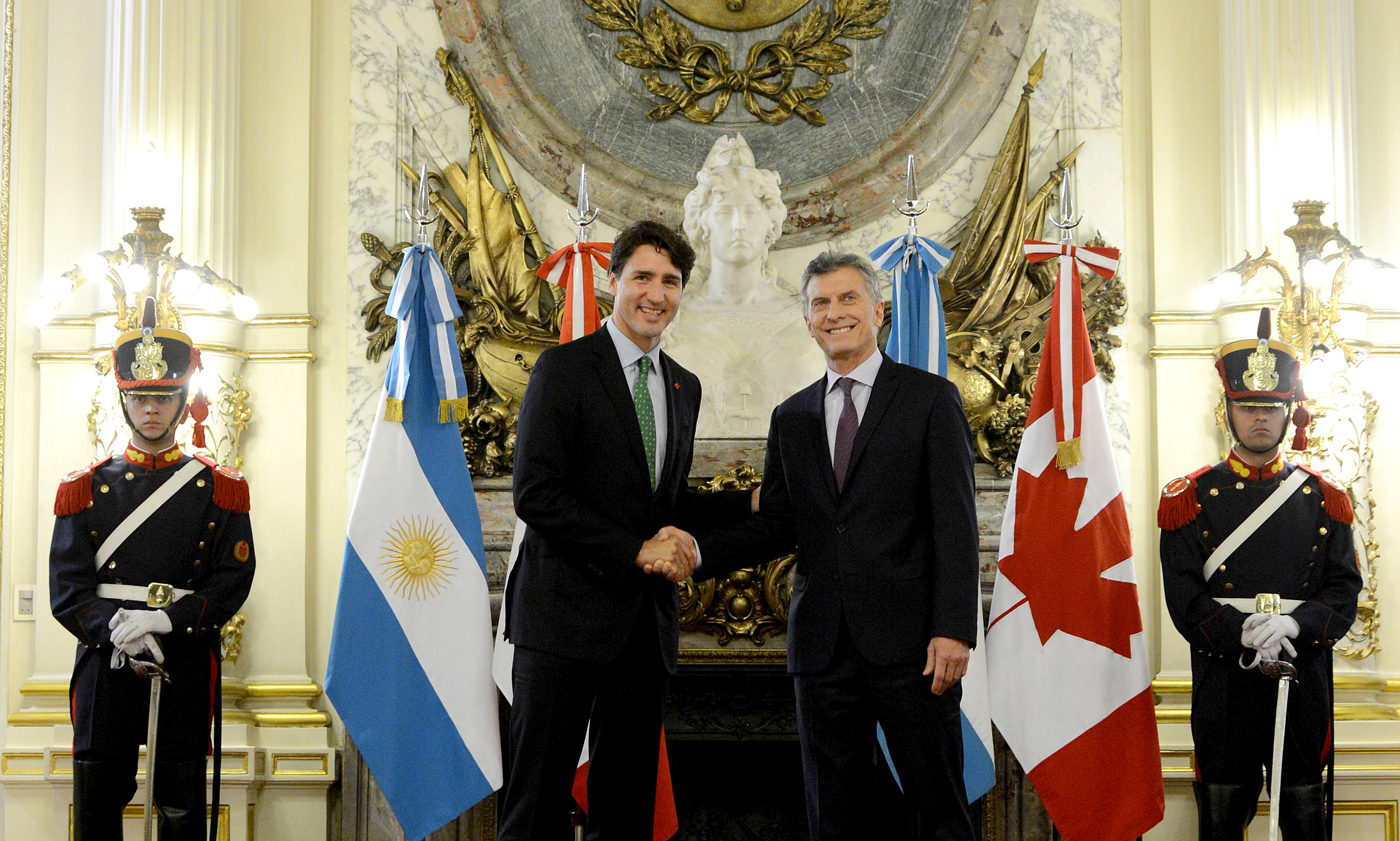
Canadian Prime Minister Justin Trudeau and Argentine President Mauricio Macri in the Casa Rosada, Buenos Aires; 2016.

High-level visits from Argentina to Canada

- President Arturo Frondizi (1961)
- Foreign Minister Guido di Tella (1991)
- President Carlos Menem (1994)
- President Fernando de la Rúa (2001)
- President Cristina Fernández de Kirchner (2010)
- Vice President Gabriela Michetti (2016)
- President Mauricio Macri (2018)

High-level visits from Canada to Argentina

- Foreign Minister Mitchell Sharp (1968)
- Prime Minister Jean Chrétien (1995, 1998)
- Governor General Adrienne Clarkson (2001)
- Prime Minister Paul Martin (2005)
- Governor General Michaëlle Jean (2007)
- Prime Minister Justin Trudeau (2016, 2018)

== Bilateral agreements ==
Both nations have signed several agreements such as an Agreement for the construction of the nuclear power plant in the Río Tercero Reservoir (1976); Air Transport Agreement (1979); Agreement for the Promotion and Protection of Investments (1993); Agreement on Avoidance of Double Taxation and the Prevention of Fiscal Evasion with Respect to Taxes on Income and on Capital (1994); Treaty on Mutual Criminal Assistance (2000); Memorandum of Understanding in energy efficiency (2018); Memorandum of Understanding in policies in the mining sector (2018); and a Memorandum of Understanding in cooperation in nuclear energy (2018).

== Trade ==
In 2022, two-way trade between Argentina and Canada totaled US$1..6 billion. Argentina's main exports to Canada include: gold and other minerals; wine; fruit (apples and citrus); mineral ores and prepared vegetable foodstuffs. Canada's main exports to Argentina include: machinery and parts; aerospace products; pharmaceutical products; and electrical and electronic machinery and equipment. Argentina is Canada's 53rd-largest export destination globally. In March 2018, Mercosur trade bloc ministers (which includes Argentina) agreed to launch formal negotiations toward a comprehensive Canada-Mercosur free trade agreement (FTA). Canadian multinational gold mining company, Barrick Gold, operates in Argentina.

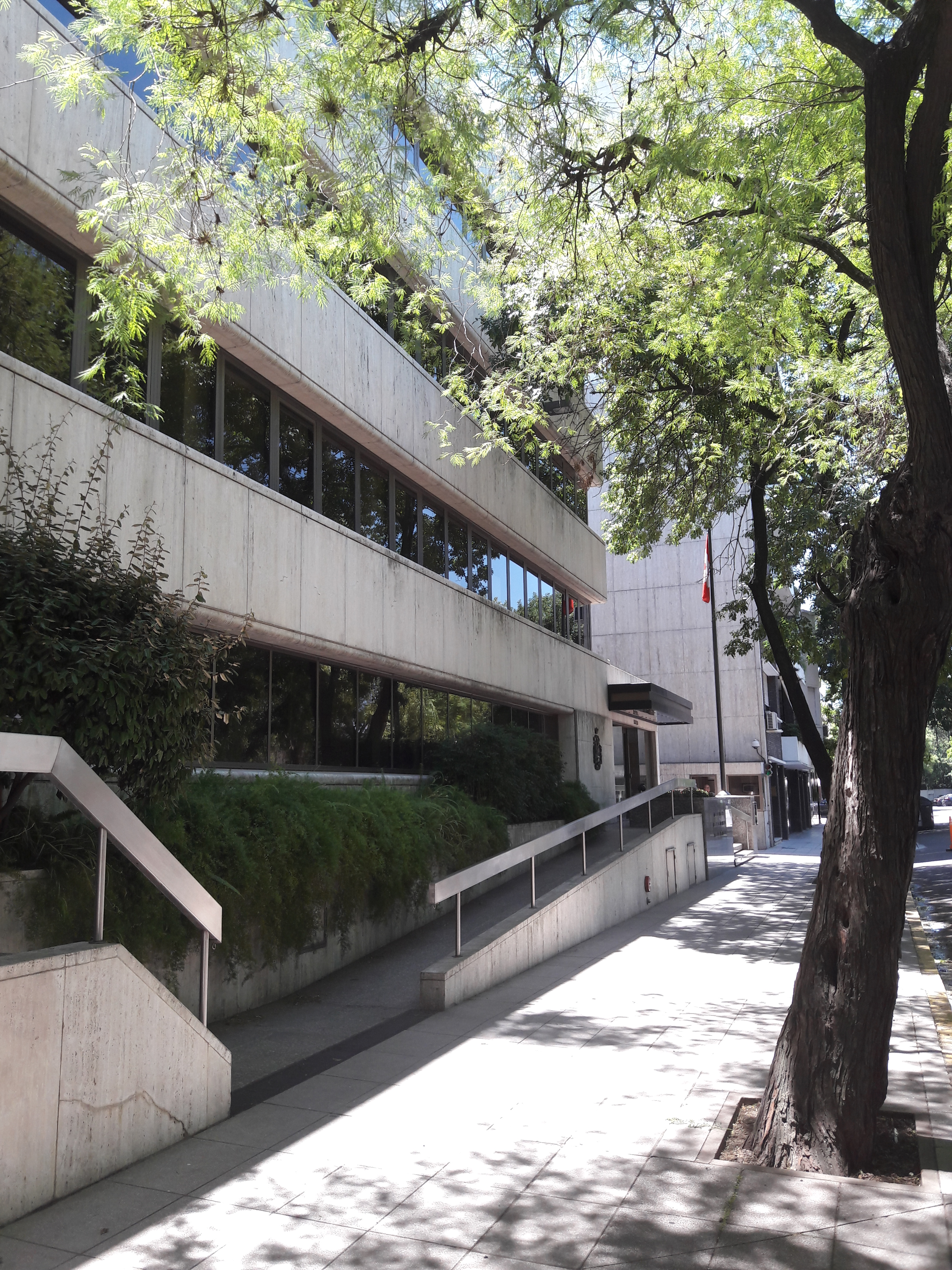
Embassy of Canada in Buenos Aires

== Resident diplomatic missions ==
- Argentina has an embassy in Ottawa and consulates-general in Montreal, Toronto and Vancouver.
- Canada has an embassy in Buenos Aires.

== See also ==
- Foreign relations of Argentina
- Foreign relations of Canada
- Argentine Canadians
- Plaza Canadá
