= Thunderbird Park (Victoria, British Columbia) =

Park in British Columbia, Canada

Coordinates: 48.4200°N 123.3665°W

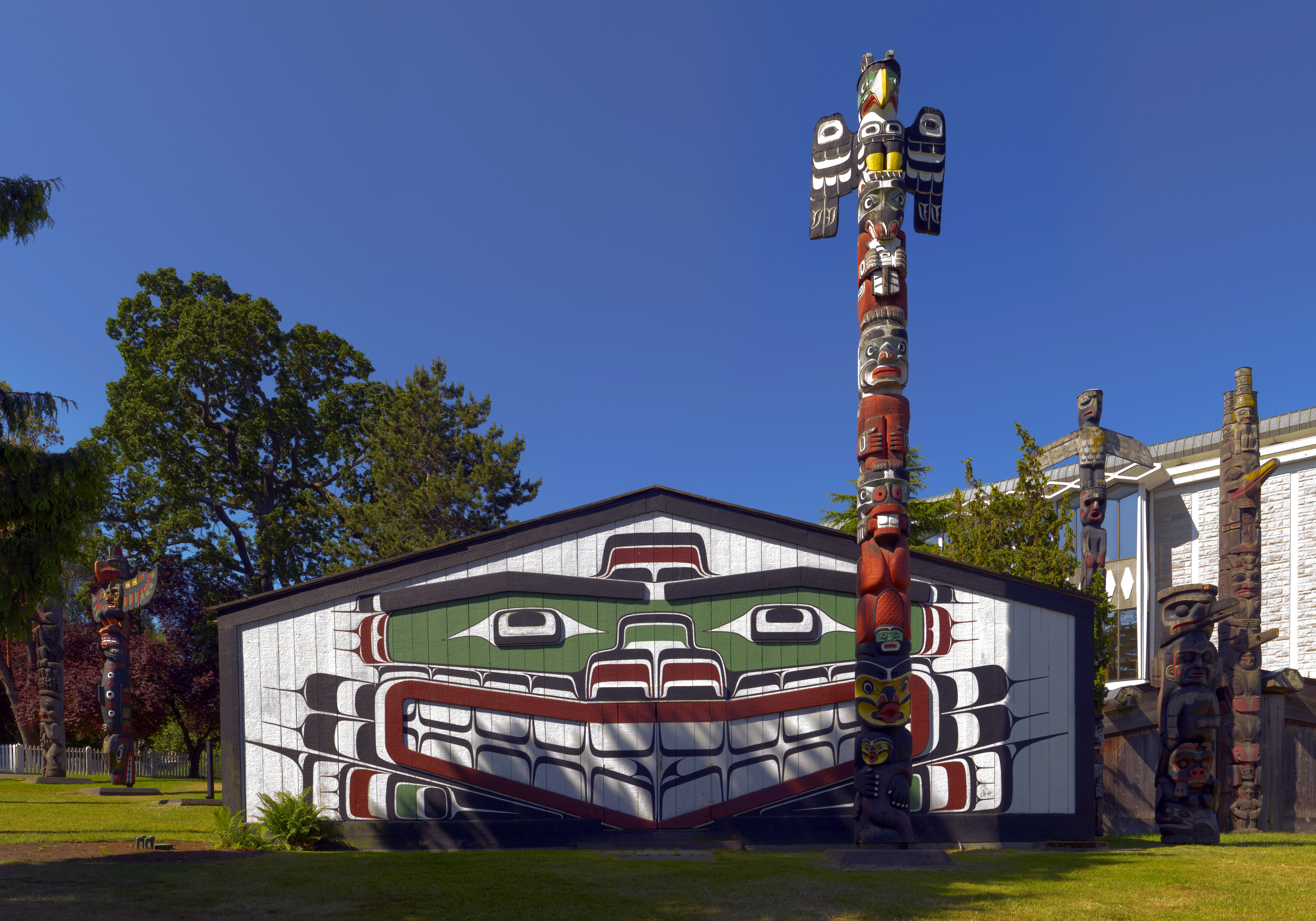
- Thunderbird Park
- Interactive map of Thunderbird Park
- Type: Public park
- Location: Victoria, British Columbia, Canada

Thunderbird Park in Victoria, British Columbia, Canada, is next to the Royal British Columbia Museum and home to many totem poles (mostly Gitxsan, Haida, and Kwakwakaʼwakw) and other First Nation monuments. The park takes its name from the mythological Thunderbird of Indigenous North American cultures, which is depicted on many totem poles.

Also in the park are St. Anne's Schoolhouse (built 1844), Helmcken House (built in 1852 by Dr. John Helmcken), and Mungo Martin House (Wawaditʼla), a traditional Kwakwakaʼwakw "big house" built in 1953 by Kwakwakaʼwakw Chief Mungo Martin. The park is part of the Royal BC Museum Cultural Precinct, an area around the museum that contains a number of historical sites and monuments.

== History ==
Totem poles were first erected on the site in 1940 as part of a conservation effort to preserve some of the region's rapidly deteriorating Aboriginal art. The site was opened as Thunderbird Park in 1941. By 1951, many of the poles had greatly decayed, and in 1952 the Royal BC Museum began a restoration program with Chief Martin as its head carver. Martin died in 1962 and was succeeded by renowned carver Henry Hunt. Other artists who have worked as part of the program include Henry Hunt's sons Richard Hunt and Tony Hunt, Tim Paul, Lawrence Bell, David Gladstone, David Martin, and Bill Reid. All of the original poles were replaced with new versions by 1992, and some of the originals are now preserved within the museum.
