= Helmcken House =

Coordinates: 48.4200°N 123.3665°W

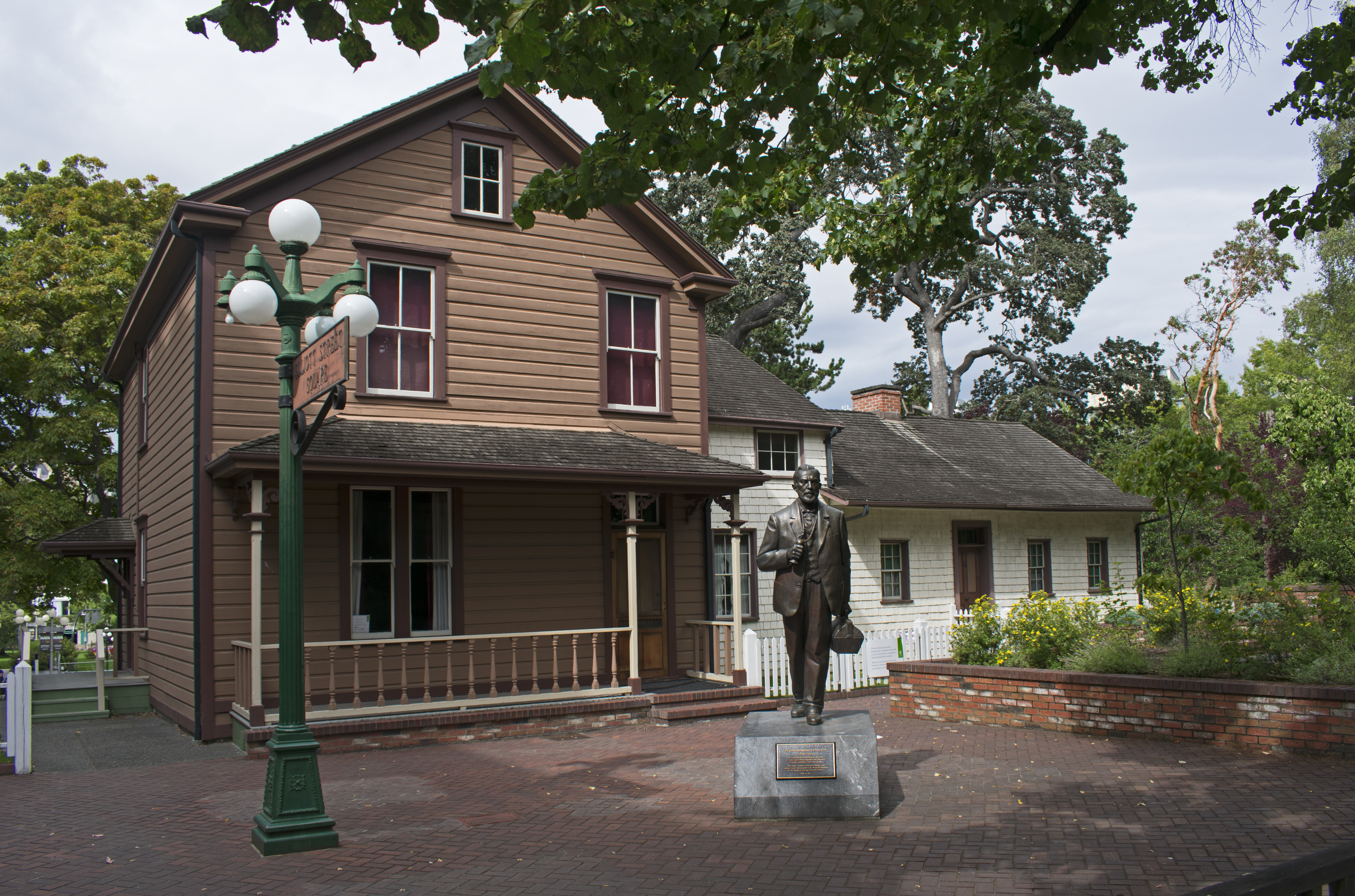
- Location: Thunderbird Park, Victoria, British Columbia, Canada
- Type: historic house museum
- Website: royalbcmuseum.bc.ca

Helmcken House is a museum in Victoria, British Columbia, located in Thunderbird Park. It was built in 1852 by Dr. John Sebastian Helmcken, a surgeon with the Hudson's Bay Company and the first doctor in Victoria when he married Cecilia Douglas, daughter of Governor James Douglas. Some interesting items on display include his medical kit. It is one of the oldest houses in British Columbia still on its original site.

== See also ==
- Statue of John Sebastian Helmcken
- Craigdarroch Castle, another historic residence in Victoria.
