= Tony Hunt Sr. =

First Nations artist from British Columbia (1942–2017)

Chief Tony Hunt Sr.
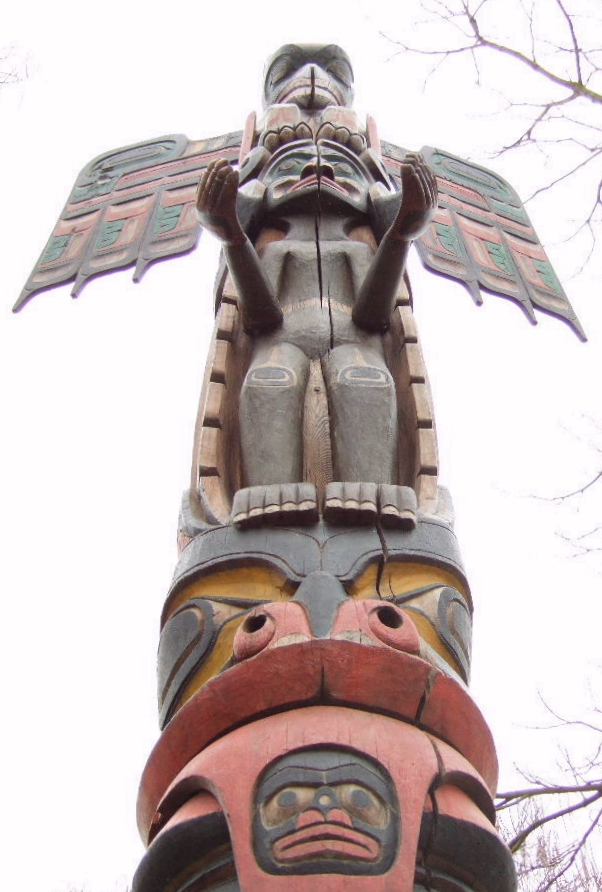
- Red cedar totem pole (1979) by Chief Tony Hunt Sr. in Bonn, Germany
- Born: 24 August 1942; Alert Bay, British Columbia, Canada
- Died: 15 December 2017 (aged 75); Campbell River, British Columbia, Canada
- Citizenship: Kwakwaka'wakw and Canadian)
- Known for: Sculpture, Painting
- Awards: Order of British Columbia (2010)

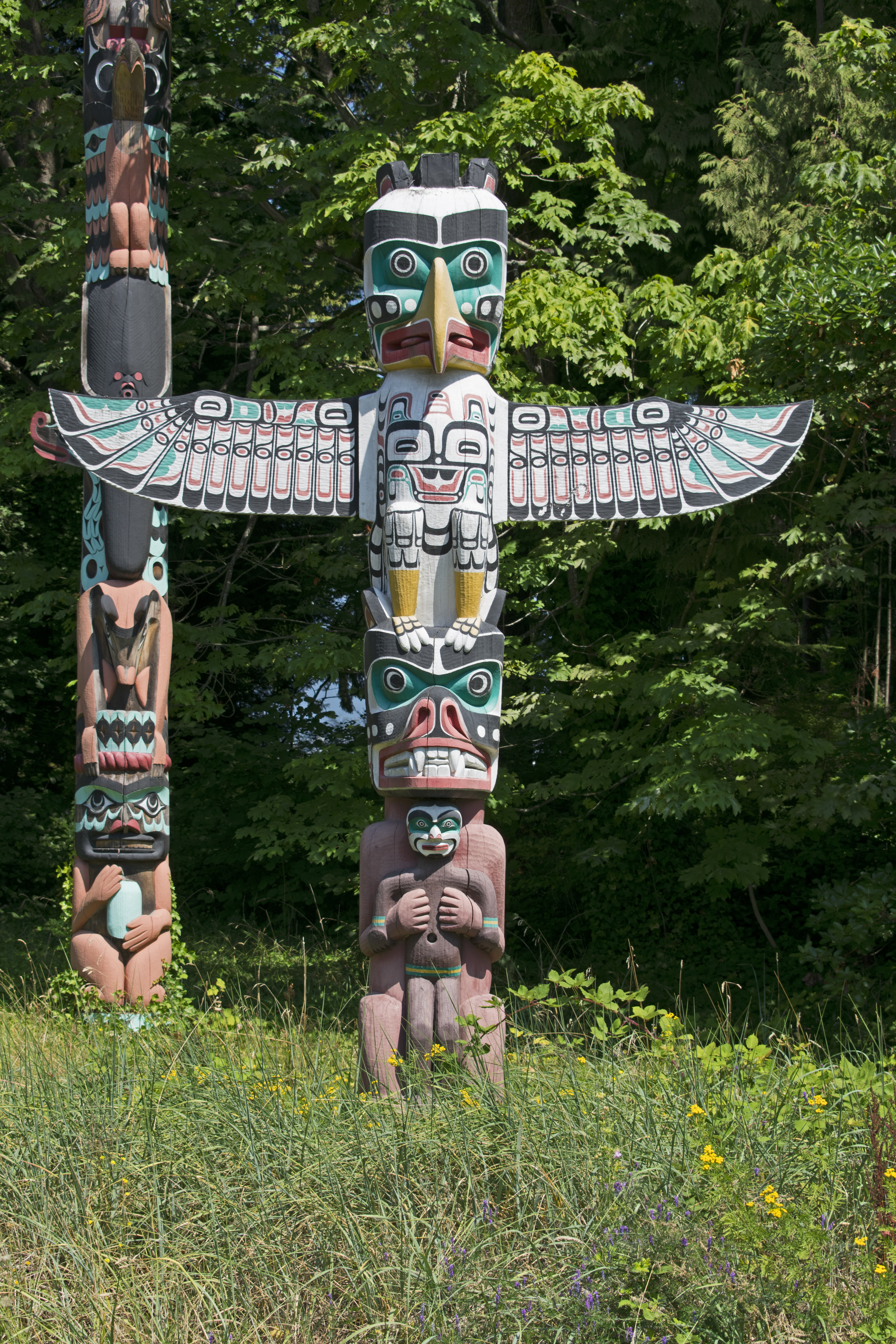
Thunderbird House Totem Pole, Stanley Park, Vancouver, British Columbia, Canada

Tony Hunt Sr. OBC RCA (24 August 1942 – 15 December 2017) was a Canadian First Nations artist noted for his KwaGulth style paintings and totem poles, which he carved from single cedar logs.

== Early life ==
Tony Hunt was born in 1942 at the Kwakwakaʼwakw community of Alert Bay, British Columbia, and was the oldest of six sons of Henry Hunt and Helen Hunt. The youth received early training from his maternal grandfather Mungo Martin. Through his maternal line, Hunt was a hereditary chief of the Kwakwaka'wakw.

His father was a professional woodcarver. Hunt and his brothers are also descendants of the renowned ethnologist George Hunt (Tlingit), who collected hundreds of Kwakwaka'wakw artworks for an exhibition at the 1893 World's Columbian Exposition in Chicago.

== Career ==
Hunt worked with Mungo Martin and Henry Hunt on the Canadian totem, gifted to Mexico by the Canadian government in 1961.

After his grandfather Martin's death in 1962, Hunt became assistant carver to his father Henry Hunt at Thunderbird Park in Victoria, B.C. His younger brothers, Richard Hunt and Stanley C. Hunt, also became professional carvers. In 1970 Hunt opened the Arts of the Raven Gallery in Victoria.

In 1984 Kraft Foods, Inc. commissioned Tony Hunt to carve a replacement totem pole, Kwanusila (Thunderbird), for a Kwakwaka'wakw pole donated by James L. Kraft, industrialist, to the city of Chicago in 1929. It was installed at the waterfront of Lake Michigan. After decades in the public park, the pole had suffered weather deterioration and vandalism. With new appreciation for its historic and cultural value, the original pole was sent to the museum in British Columbia for preservation and study. Kwanusila is installed at the lakeside park.

== Death ==
Chief Tony Hunt died in Campbell River on 15 December 2017.

== Honors ==
Hunt was awarded the Order of British Columbia in 2010.

== Sources ==
- Hunt, Ross (2007) "The Hunt Family's Trip to West Germany to Attend the Bundesgarten Show." Anthropology News, vol. 48, no. 2, pp. 20–21.
- Macnair, Peter L., Alan L. Hoover, and Kevin Neary (1984) The Legacy: Tradition and Innovation in Northwest Coast Indian Art. Vancouver, B.C.: Douglas & McIntyre.
