= List of totem poles =

Totem poles or crest poles, an old Northwest coast art form, were historically created by the Tshimshian, Haida, Tlingit, and other First Nations and Alaska Native groups in Southeast Alaska and British Columbia. After contact with Europeans, totem poles spread around the world and were collected by museums. Most surviving totem poles which exist today were carved in the 1800s or later, and the majority of totem poles along the Inside Passage (which follows the Northwest Coast) were created no earlier than the 1930s.

== North America ==
Image	Title	Location	Date	Artist	Source
	Áakʼw Kootéeyaa	Juneau, Alaska, United States	1981	Nathan Jackson	
	Baranof totem pole	Sitka, Alaska, United States	1942	George Benson, who later disavowed the pole	
	Big Beaver Totem Pole	Chicago, Illinois, United States	1982	Norman Tait	
	Boo-Qwilla	Stanford, California, United States	1995	Art Thompson	
	Canadian totem	Mexico City, Mexico	1962	Mungo Martin	
	Seattle Totem pole, also known as the Chief-of-All-Women pole or Pioneer Square totem pole	Seattle, Washington, United States (originally Tongass Island)	c. 1790, installed in Seattle in 1899 Replica installed in the 1940s		
	Chief Johnson totem pole	Ketchikan, Alaska, United States	1901 Replica created 1980		
	Farmer's Pole	Seattle, Washington, United States	1984	James Bender and Victor Steinbrueck	
	Gʼpsgolox totem pole	Kitlope Valley, Canada Formerly Museum of Ethnography, Sweden	1872		
	Healing Heart totem pole	Craig, Alaska, United States	1995	Stan Marsden	
	Kakasoʼlas pole	Vancouver, British Columbia, Canada	1955	Ellen Neel	
	Knowledge Totem Pole	Victoria, British Columbia, Canada	1990	Cicero August with Darrel and Doug August	
	Ni'isjoohl totem pole	Nisg̱aʼa Museum in British Columbia, Canada Formerly National Museum of Scotland	1800s		
	Nisgaʼa and Haida Crest Poles of the Royal Ontario Museum	Royal Ontario Museum, Canada			
	Old Witch totem pole	Juneau, Alaska, United States	c. 1880	Dwight Wallace	
	Raven Stealing the Sun totem pole	Ketchikan, Alaska, United States	1983	Dempsey Bob	
	Reconciliation Pole	Vancouver, British Columbia, Canada	2017	Jim Hart	
	Seattle Center Totem	Seattle Center in Seattle, Washington, United States	1970	Duane Pasco, Victor Mowatt, and Earl Muldon	
	Soul Pole	Seattle, Washington, United States			
	The Stanford Legacy	Stanford, California, United States	2002	Don Yeomans	
	Swinomish totem pole	Skagit County, Washington, United States	1938 Replica installed 1989	Charlie Edwards	
	Three Frogs pole	Chief Shakes Historic Site, in Wrangell, Alaska, United States	1800s Replicas created in 1940 and c. 2000 Removed in 2024		
	Untitled Totem Pole	Seattle, Washington, United States	1984	James Bender and Marvin Oliver	
	Alert Bay Totem Pole	Alert Bay, British Columbia, Canada	1973	World's Tallest Totem Pole	
	Wellbriety totem pole	Sitka, Alaska, United States	2006	Wayne Price	
	Wooshkeetaan Kootéeyaa	Juneau, Alaska, United States	1980	Nathan Jackson	
	Yaxté totem pole	Juneau, Alaska, United States	1941	Linn A. Forrest	

== Elsewhere ==
Image	Title	Location	Date	Artist	Notes
	Canadian totem	Plaza Canadá in Buenos Aires, Argentina	1964	Henry Hunt and Tony Hunt Sr	
	Kayung totem pole	British Museum in London, England Formerly Kayung, Graham Island, British Columbia, Canada	c. 1850		
	Kʼëgit pole	Musée du Quai Branly – Jacques Chirac in Paris, France	1860s		

== Sources ==
=== Bibliography ===
- Garfield, Viola E. (1996). Seattle's Totem Poles. Thistle Press. ISBN 978-0-9621935-4-5.
- Jonaitis, Aldona (2012). Discovering Totem Poles: A Traveler's Guide. University of Washington Press. ISBN 978-0-295-80688-4. OCLC 949884963.Full access available to users of The Wikipedia Library.
- Jonaitis, Aldona; Glass, Aaron (2010). The Totem Pole: An Intercultural History. University of Washington Press and Douglas & McIntyre. ISBN 978-0-295-98962-4.
- Moore, Emily L. (2018). Proud raven, panting wolf: carving Alaska's New Deal totem parks. Seattle: University of Washington Press. ISBN 978-0-295-74393-6. Full access available to users of The Wikipedia Library.
- Stewart, Hilary (1993). Looking at Totem Poles. Douglas & McIntyre and University of Washington Press.
