= Dale Campbell =

Canadian artist

Dale Campbell (born 1954) is a Canadian First Nations carver from the Tahltan nation of northern British Columbia. Her Tahltan name is Tahlthama which translates to "Tahltan Indian Mother".

== Early life and career ==
Dale Campbell was born in Prince Rupert, British Columbia, in 1954. Her ancestry is Tahltan from Telegraph Creek. She is of the Wolf clan.

In 1972, Campbell began an apprenticeship with the Tahltan carver Dempsey Bob and has also worked with the Haida carver Freda Diesing. The Museum of Northern British Columbia uses an eagle logo that was designed by Campbell. Her design won their competition in 1976.

Campbell is known for her contributions to indigenous art in Canada. Her career as an artist began to gain recognition in the early 2000s. She has been creating art since 1972. Dale Campbell works with a variety of materials to create her pieces including wood, metal, glass, etc. She has worked alongside artists Bob Dempsey and Frida Diesing, one of the few women carvers, to fine tune her carving skills.

== Totem poles ==
Many of Campbell's artworks are wood carvings.

She regularly attended the annual Santa Fe Indian Market and won first place for her paddle carving titled "eagle harvesting the salmon" in the diverse art category.

She specializes in carving totem poles and masks, including a 1982 totem pole carved for the Museum of Northern British Columbia in Prince Rupert.

== Bibliography ==
- Jensen, Doreen, and Polly Sargent (1986) Robes of Power: Totem Poles on Cloth. Vancouver: University of British Columbia Press.
- Lough, Shannon, “Tahltan Artist Takes First Place for Paddle Carving.” The Northern View, September 12, 2017. https://www.thenorthernview.com/community/tahltan-artist-takes-first-place-for-paddle-carving-5948099.
- Lough, Shannon, “Video and Story: Heart of Our City - Carving Her Best.” The Northern View, May 10, 2017. https://www.thenorthernview.com/community/video-and-story-heart-of-our-city-carving-her-best-5947706.
- “Dale Campbell.” Inuit Gallery of Vancouver Ltd. Accessed May 4, 2024. https://inuit.com/pages/dale-campbell.
