= Healing Heart totem pole =

Memorial totem pole in Craig, Alaska

Coordinates: 55°28′36.3″N 133°7′56.7″W

- Artist: Stan Marsden
- Year: 1995
- Medium: red cedar
- Location: Craig, Alaska, US

The Healing Heart totem pole, also known as the Craig Healing totem, is a memorial totem pole in Craig, Alaska, United States. Installed in 1995, it was carved by Stan Marsden in honor of his son, Jimmy Marsden, who had died in 1991 of a cocaine overdose. Marsden invited others from the community to participate in the carving with him and dedicated the pole to Alaskan youth and people who had died from substance use in Alaska. Though not part of the original design, the totem pole depicts a figure holding a basket of roses; at the installation ceremony, attendees placed roses at the base of the totem pole to commemorate those they had lost.

Two documentaries were filmed about the Healing Heart totem: Healing Heart Totem by Ken Yates and Carved from the Heart (1997) by Louise Brady and Ellen Frankenstein. Carved from the Heart, which contains the stories of Craig residents, was selected to screen at the Sundance Film Festival and won Best Documentary Short from the American Indian Film Festival.

== Design and location ==
The Healing Heart pole is located in a Healing Heart Memorial Park on East Hamilton Drive, Craig, off the Craig-Klawock highway, overlooking a boat harbor. Made from unpainted red cedar that was over 500 years old, sources describe the pole as being from 45 to 48 feet tall and around 3,000 to 4,000 pounds.

Created as a memorial pole for the Stan Marsden's son, Jimmy, who had died of a cocaine overdose, the pole is dedicated to Alaskan youth, or, more specifically, Craig youth, those who have died from drugs or alcohol in Alaska. When speaking on the pole's history, art historian Aldona Jonaitis and Aaron Glass have described the pole as "a redeeming factor in a contemporary tragedy". The pole was designed by Stan Marsden.

The pole is unusual in its design, combining a non-traditional figure holding a basket of roses alongside traditional clan crests. It depicts a killer whale and a raven, representing Stan Marsden's clan, a man and frog to represent Jimmy Marden's mother's clan, and a bear with two cubs, a traditional Tsimshian clan figure. The figure holding roses, which Marsden nicknamed "the uninvited guest", was not originally part of the totem pole's design. It was added to a blank section of the pole, after Marsden saw the log was longer than he had planned for.

== Background ==
Stan Marsden, a Tsimshian man, was born in Metlakatla, in 1930. He served in the US Navy, moving back to Alaska after he married. He had four children and was an accomplished totem pole carver. He died in March 2015, after being diagnosed with lung cancer.

Jimmy Marsden was Stan Marsden's only son. According to his sister, Jan, when they were children he would protect her from their father's violent outbursts. He died in 1991 from a cocaine overdose.

== History ==
After his son's death from cocaine use, Stan Marsden decided to carve a memorial pole in his memory. With permission from the other Marsdens, a tree donated by Sealaska and in a tent on a site lent to him by the city of Craig, Marsden created a committee and invited both Native and non-Native people from Craig to carve the totem pole with him. Though he initially worked by himself, Marsden was joined by Tlingit, Haida, Tsimshian, and non-Native people from Craig. For many of the people involved, it was their first time carving. Tools for carving the pole included a chainsaw, in the early stages, an adze, and hooked knives, and Marsden worked 12 to 14-hour days.

The Healing Heart totem pole was raised on October 21, 1995. There was a ceremonial procession, and over 120 people participated; children ceremonially smudged the totem pole. People place roses near the base of the totem pole in memory of people they knew who had died. The raising itself was held after a multi-day event on drug education, held with the local schools. The Healing Heart totem pole is the first totem pole raised in the settlement of Craig, and the first by the community in modern times.

After the Healing Heart pole, Stan Marsden carved poles for the communities of Metlakatka and Hydaburg. At the raising of Craig's Healing Heart totem, elders in the Hydaburg, a historical rival of the Tshimshian people, held a potlach. In return, Marsden carved the Friendship Pole, erected in 1998. Four years later, Marsden, alongside Mike Booth and youth in Metlakatka, carved another Healing Heart pole: the Lip kyʼanim Healing Heart pole. The Lip kyʼanim Healing Heart pole was raised by the Metlakatla Indian Community in 2002.

After Stan Marsden's death, people in Craig held a memorial and rededication to the totem pole in October 2015, again placing roses. The Council for the City of Craig also established the park where the totem was as the Healing Heart Memorial Park, in Marsden's honor, and Craig residents continued to place flowers at the totem pole after the initial raising.

== Documentaries ==
Two documentaries were filmed about the Healing Heart totem pole: Carved from the Heart, produced by Louise Brady and Ellen Frankenstein, and Healing Heart Totem, by Ken Yates. Yates and Frankenstein shared footage.

=== Healing Heart Totem ===
Filmed by Ken Yates, a friend of Stan Marsden's, Healing Heart Totem was made in conjunction with the Healing Heart Committee. It was funded by donations from individuals in the community and Yates himself. Healing Heart Totem showed footage of the totem pole raising ceremony, dances, speeches, as well as community fundraising efforts such as bake sales. Yates assisted Marsden with the carving as he filmed.

=== Carved from the Heart ===
Carved from the Heart
- Produced by: Ellen Frankenstein and Louise Brady
- Distributed by: New Day Films
- Release date: 1997
- Running time: 30 minutes

Louise Brady heard about the Healing Heart totem pole project while working for the Southeast Alaska Regional Health Consortium; a dance group she participated in was invited by Marsden to perform at the pole-raising. She suggested to producer Ellen Frankenstein that she should make a film about the totem pole. The two filmed 25 hours of footage. They recorded both the pole raising ceremony and, afterwards, several sessions of interviews with Stan Marsden, his family, and the residents of Craig.

Screening the original rough cut in Anchorage, 1996, by early 1997, Brady and Frankenstein had received a $50,000 grant from the Rockefeller Foundation to finish the film, make a video guide and website, and screen it. The film also received funding from the Sitka Tribe of Alaska, the Institute of Noetic Sciences, the Alaska Humanities Forum, National Endowment for the Humanities, Southeast Alaska Regional Health Consortium, Klukwan Heritage Foundation, the settlements of Kake and Craig, Puffin Foundation, National Bank of Alaska, and others. The final product was 30 minutes long and finished in September 1997, and released that same year by New Day Films. Frankenstein went on to produce a sequel, titled Words from the Heart.

Carved from the Heart documents the planning, carving, and raising of the Healing Heart totem pole by Stan Marsden and the rest of Craig. The themes of the film include substance abuse, domestic violence, depression, PTSD, suicides, and Alaska Native lifestyles and generational grief, though it does not explicitly link discrimination and marginalization of Alaska Natives to the people's lives. More focused on the secrets and personal traumas of Craig's residents than Yates's film, Carved from the Heart does not utilize a narrator. Instead, the film contains segments where Craig residents tell stories about their lives and explain what the pole means to them. Stories discussed in the film include a man who served in the Vietnam War; his son also speaks, telling the audience about the time he saved his father from a suicide attempt. The film ends with a recording of Stan Marsden's speech at the totem pole raising, then a section from Jan Marsden (his daughter) explaining how she believes her brother would be proud of the totem pole, and how she used to not care if Stan Marsden was alive or not.

The film was screened around Alaska, including at settlements such as Juneau, Sitka, Kake, and Palmer. It was also selected to be shown at the Sundance Film Festival; the festival described it as the first film made by Alaskans to be shown at the festival. Carved from the Heart won Best Documentary Short from the American Indian Film Festival, and Brady and Frankenstein received the Edna Hartley award from Institute of Noetic Sciences. A 1999 review in American Anthropologist praised Carved from the Heart, saying that the film makers did not rely on "shock, sensationalism, or sentimentality" like other films on similar subjects.

== See also ==
- List of totem poles
