= Smarch =

Smarch may refer to:

== People ==
- Carl Smarch, a candidate in the 1989 Yukon general election
- Jim Smarch, a candidate in the 1992 Yukon general election
- Keith Wolfe Smarch, a Tlingit people woodcarver and apprentice of Dempsey Bob
