= Farmer's Pole =

Totem pole in Seattle, Washington, U.S.

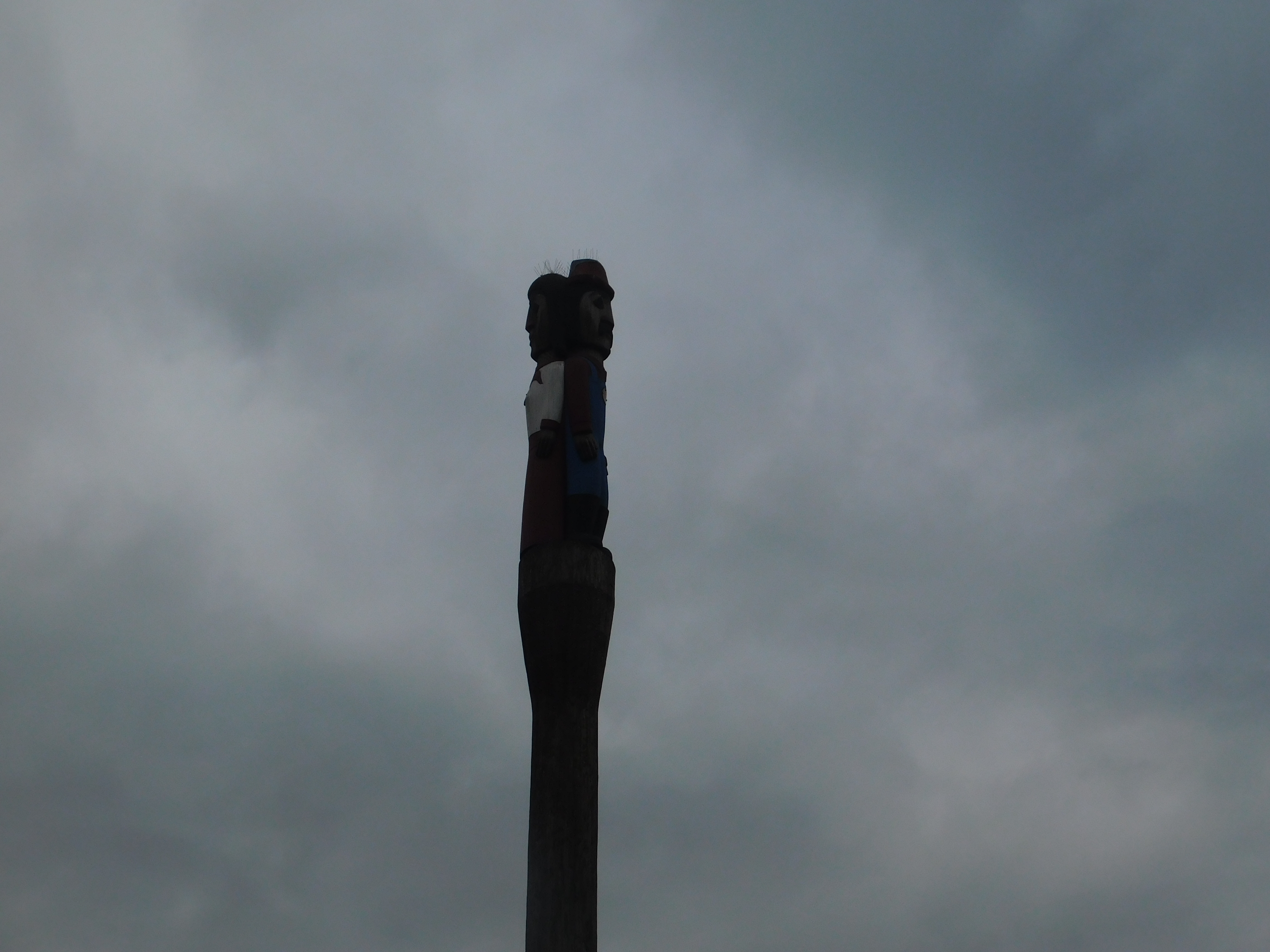
- Top of the totem pole in 2017
- Artist: Marvin Oliver; James Bender; Victor Steinbrueck
- Year: 1984
- Medium: Cedar Wood
- Location: Seattle, Washington, U.S.
- Coordinates: 47.609959°N 122.343831°W

Farmer's Pole is a 1984 cedar totem pole designed by Quinault artist Marvin Oliver, carved by artist James Bender and commissioned by architect Victor Steinbrueck, installed in Seattle's Victor Steinbrueck Park, in Washington state.

== Description and history ==
The 50-ft-tall wooden sculpture has a diameter measuring approximately 35 inches, and it is installed on a square concrete base with a height of approximately 1 foot (30 cm) and diameter of 3 feet, 5 inches. The totem is mostly smooth, with the exception of one male and one female figure who stand back to back at the top.

After standing for about 40 years, Oliver's totem pole was removed for park reconstruction in April 2023.

== See also ==
- 1984 in art
- List of totem poles
