= Victor Steinbrueck Park =

Park in Seattle

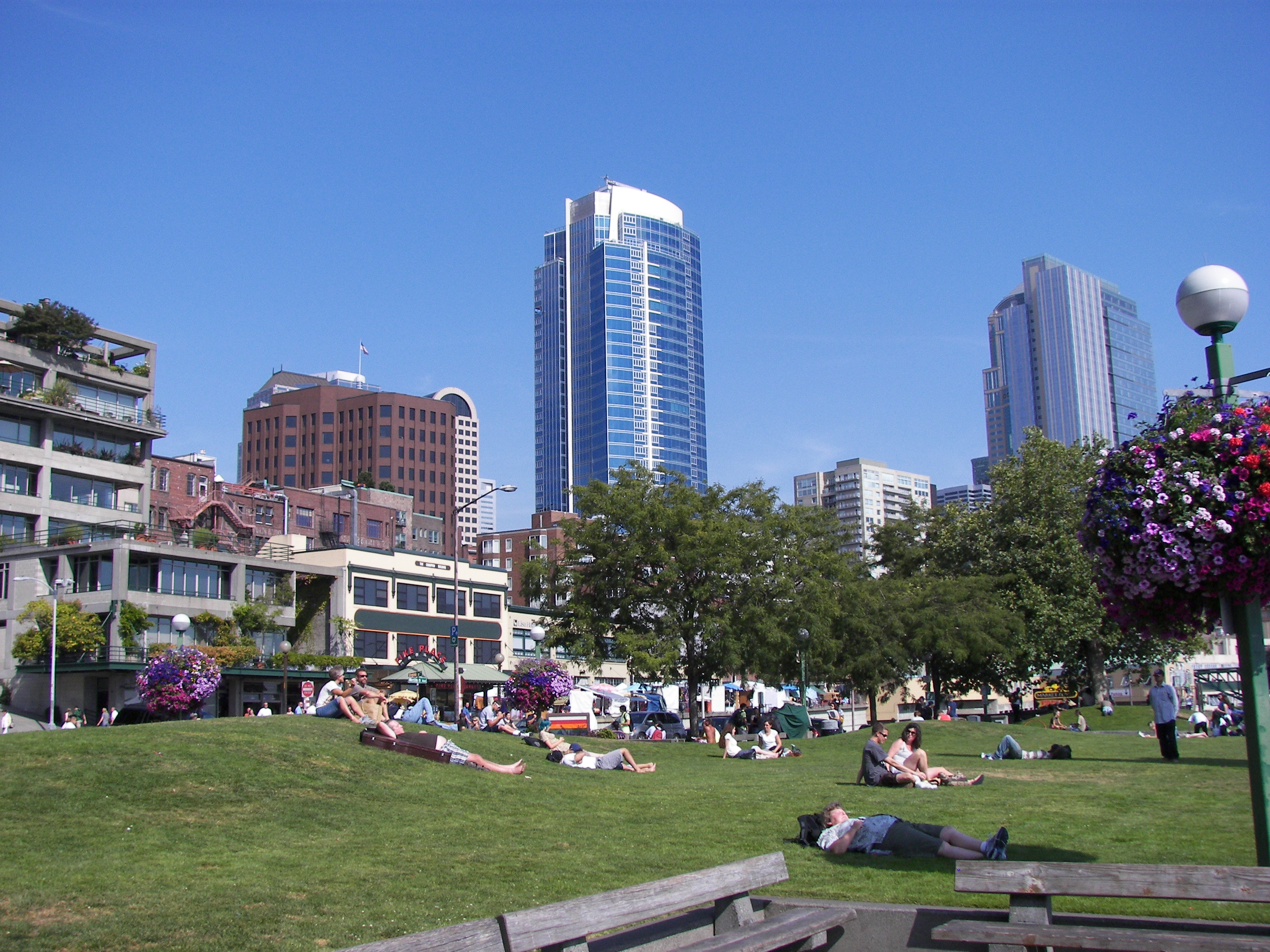
- Victor Steinbrueck Park in July 2009. Fifteen Twenty-One Second Avenue is in the background.
- Interactive map of Victor Steinbrueck Park
- Type: Urban Park
- Location: Seattle, Washington
- Coordinates: 47°36′36″N 122°20′38″W
- Area: 0.8 acres (3,200 m^{2})
- Established: 1971
- Operator: Seattle Parks and Recreation

Victor Steinbrueck Park is an urban park in Downtown Seattle, Washington, United States, located just northwest of Pike Place Market overlooking Elliott Bay. Named for the Seattle-based architect Victor Steinbrueck, it is positioned between Western Avenue and Alaskan Way at the foot of Virginia Street. The 0.8-acre (0.32 ha) park opened in 1971 and underwent major renovations from 2019 to 2025.

== History ==
The park overlaps the former site of the Washington National Guard Armory, which was originally built around 1909 and damaged by fire in 1962 at a time when the future of the Market itself was a contentious issue. It was eventually torn down in 1968. Victor Steinbrueck, who was instrumental in the preservation of nearby Pike Place Market and Pioneer Square, wrote of the location in 1968: "One of the grandest downtown lookout places is at Western Avenue where it meets Pike Place and Virginia Street. It has been neglected by the city and its possibilities for enjoyment are ignored except by a few habitués and passing pedestrians." Steinbrueck was strongly opposed to the demolition of the armory. "Buildings like this," he wrote, "(and there are very few) offer an irreplaceable tie with the past as well as adding variety and interest to new surroundings. Restoration is not at all impossible or difficult for sympathetic designers. Others can always find practical reasons for destruction."

The city purchased the land in 1968, demolished the remnant of the armory, and transferred ownership to the parks department in 1970. The park was landscaped in 1982 as Market Park. Two cedar totem poles, designed by Marvin Oliver and carved by James Bender, were added in March 1984. After Steinbrueck's death in 1985, the park was renamed after him. His son Peter Steinbrueck, also an architect, would later serve on the Seattle City Council from 1997 to 2007. Calls to remove the totem poles, which do not have local indigenous meaning or significance, emerged in the 2010s.

=== Renovation and totem pole removal ===
In December 2022, the park closed for a two-year renovation project to repair the waterproofing membrane under the park, which had deteriorated and leaked water into the parking garage below. The project also included new furnishings, a replacement pavilion, and upgraded lighting. The park was scheduled to reopen in late 2024, more than several months behind the original scheduled April date. A modified plan released in December 2023 would permanently replace the totem poles with indigenous welcome sculptures from members of the Suquamish and Muckleshoot tribes. The totem poles had been moved to city-owned property at Fort Lawton for storage but were left exposed to the elements until they were covered with tarps in December 2023.

The Pike Place Market Historical Commission rejected the proposed replacement and required the restoration of the original totem poles in their December 2023 meeting. The city government planned to appeal the decision, arguing that a different piece of indigenous art would be more appropriate for the park. The renovations to Victor Steinbrueck Park were completed in November 2024, but the park's reopening was delayed due to the ongoing dispute with the commission. The park was reopened on March 14, 2025, a day after Seattle mayor Bruce Harrell announced that the city had the authority to do so, rather than the historical commission. The totem poles remained uninstalled.

== See also ==
- Farmer's Pole (1984)
- Untitled Totem Pole (1984)
