= Raven Stealing the Sun totem pole =

Totem pole in Ketchikan, Alaska

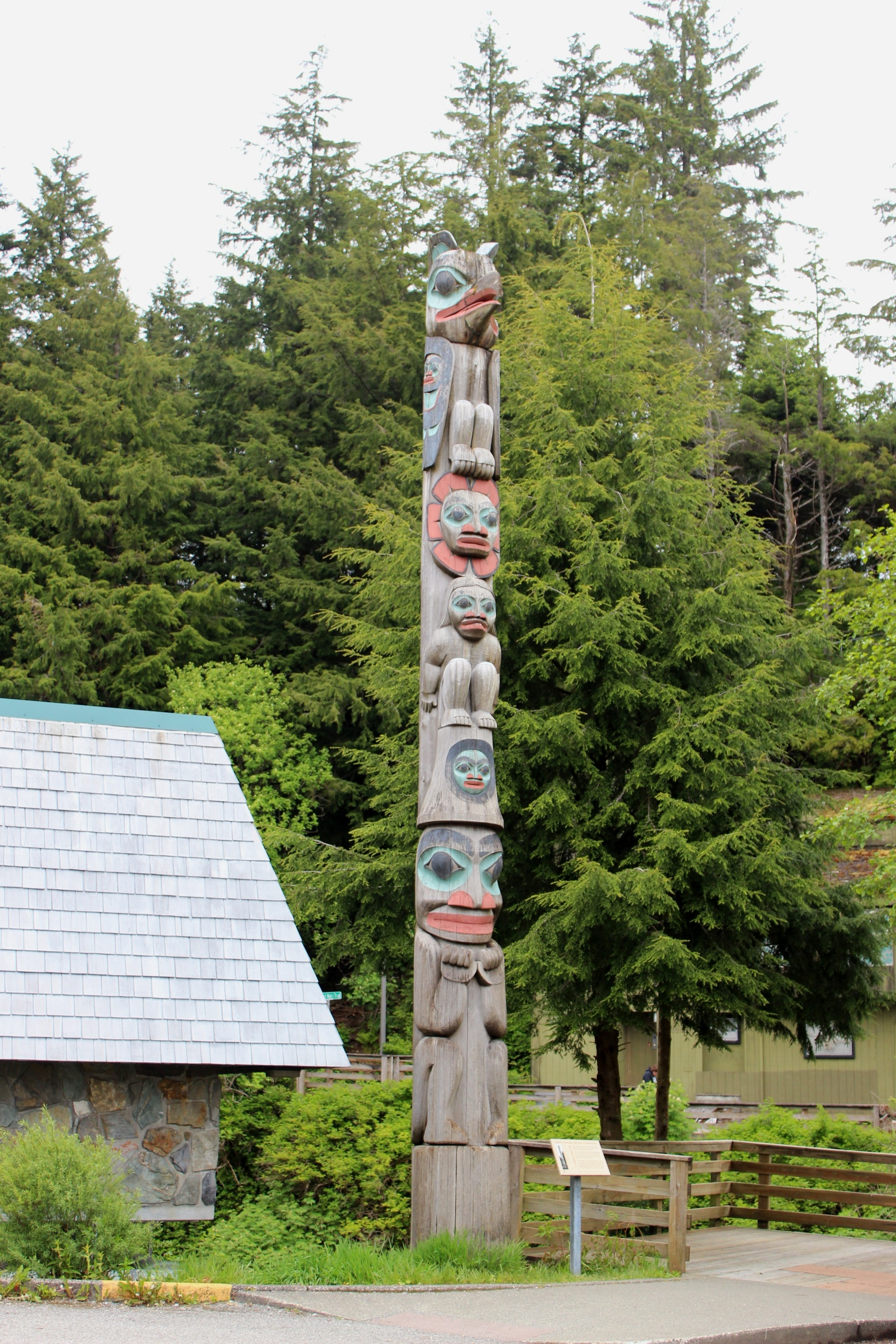
- Artist: Dempsey Bob
- Year: 1983
- Medium: western red cedar
- Location: Ketchikan, Alaska, United States; 55.3425°N 131.6432°W

The Raven Stealing the Sun Kootéeyaa, also known as the Raven Stealing the Sun totem pole, is a totem pole in Ketchikan, Alaska. Located outside the Tongass Historical Museum, it was commissioned by the museum in the 1980s to honor the Tongass Tlingit. It was carved in 1982 by Dempsey Bob and Stanley Bevan, and installed on May 21, 1983. The totem pole depicts the story of Raven stealing the sun and giving daylight to humankind.

== Description ==
The pole depicts the story of Raven stealing the sun and giving daylight to humans; on the very top of the pole is Raven, with a blue face, black eyes, red beak, and black wings. Raven stands above a six-rayed sun, with red mouth and rays. Below them is a chief's daughter, wearing a labret, with black eyes lined with blue and a red mouth. At the very base of the pole is the chief, with black eyes and a red nose and mouth. He is wearing a hat, on which is a baby's face, painted blue.

The pole is 39 feet (12 m) tall and made from western red cedar. Hilary Stewart and Aldona Jonaitis describe it as a Tlingit pole.

== History ==
The pole was commissioned in the 1980s by the Tongass Historical Museum, with funding from the city of Ketchikan, the National Endowment for the Arts, the Alaska State Council, and the Sealaska Corporation. The 17 metres (56 ft) log for the totem pole was donated by Sealaska. The museum commission Canadian Tlingit and Tahtan artist Dempsey Bob to perform the carving; his mother's family were Tongass Tlingit, which the pole was designed to honor. Bob worked with nephew and apprentice, Stanley Bevan, on the carving, as well as Kenny McNeil. It was Bob's eleventh pole. Carving and painting took place over three months during the summer and fall of 1982.

The pole was installed on May 21, 1983 outside the Centennial Building, which houses the Tongass Historical Museum. Over 400 people attended the dedication ceremony, which included dancing. Included in the attendees were Dempsey's grandmothers, both in their eighties. The dedication ceremony and raising was sponsored by the Ketchikan Totem Heritage Center. According to an article in The Globe and Mail, the Raven Stealing the Sun pole met with positive reception and was "declared by many to be the most beautiful ever made"

The pole is administered by the City of Ketchikan Department of Public Works; it was repaired in 2003. In September 2024, it was temporarily removed for restoration by carver Tommy Joseph, and re-installed the following March.

== See also ==
- List of totem poles
