= Untitled Totem Pole =

Totem pole in Seattle, Washington, U.S.

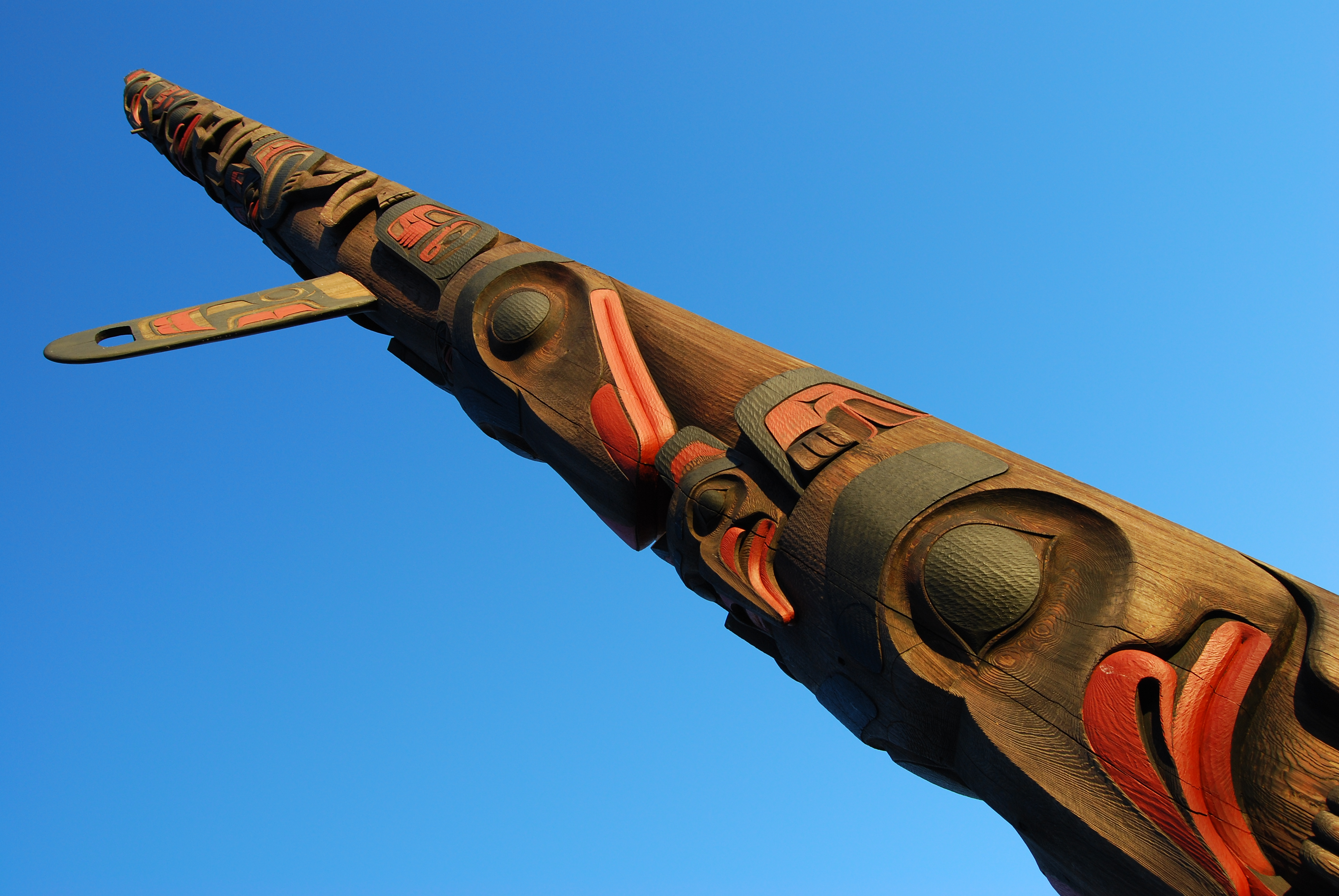
- The totem pole in 2010
- Artist: James Bender; Marvin Oliver
- Year: 1984
- Location: Seattle, Washington, U.S.
- Coordinates: 47.610142°N 122.344136°W

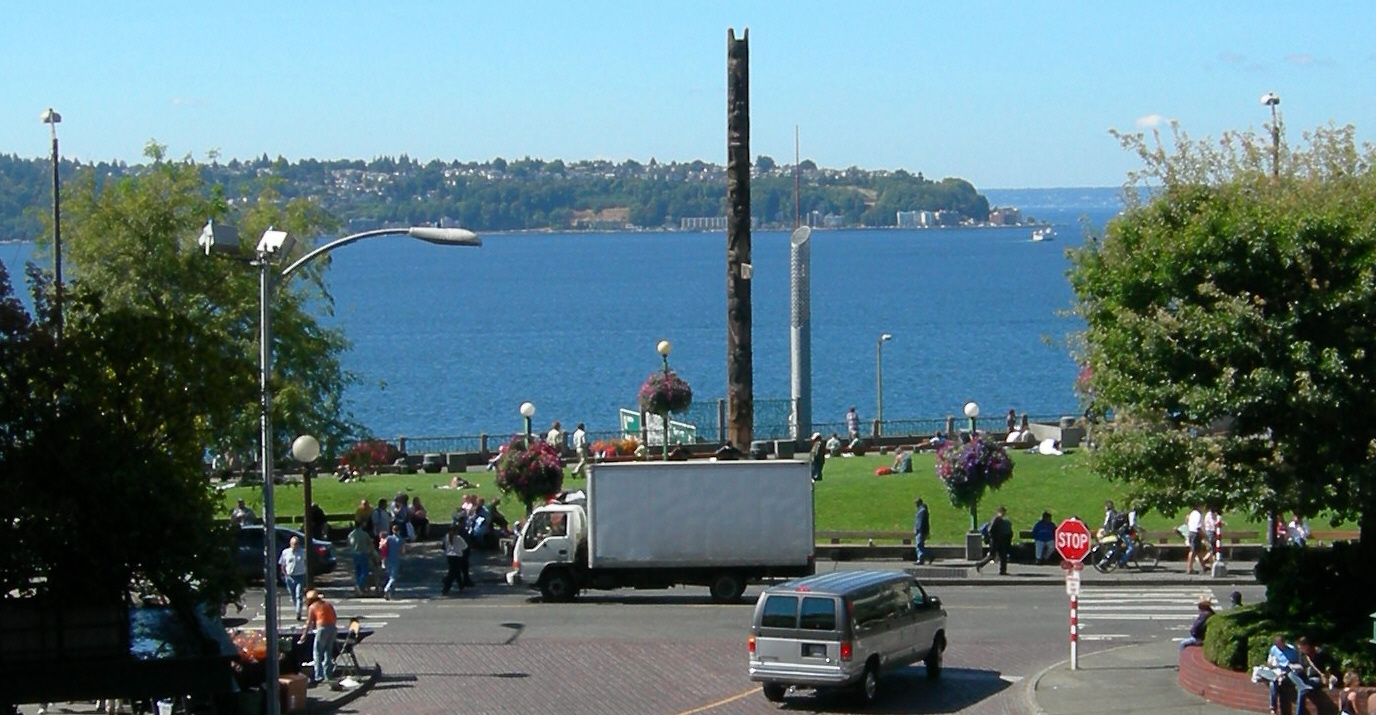
The totem in Victor Steinbrueck Park, 2006

Untitled Totem Pole (also known as simply Untitled or Totem Pole) is a 1984 cedar totem pole created by James Bender and Marvin Oliver, installed in Seattle's Victor Steinbrueck Park, in the U.S. state of Washington.

== Description and history ==
Oliver and Bender designed the 50-foot (15 m) totem based on Haida imagery, and Bender carved the sculpture. The top of the totem depicts a raven holding a Salish spinning whorl. Below the raven are human figures, a killer whale with a protruding dorsal fin, another smaller raven, and a bear holding a hawk. The pole is mounted on a concrete base and supported by a steel beam.

== See also ==
- 1984 in art
- List of totem poles
