= Jewell James =

Lummi Nation wood carver, activist

- Born: February 2, 1953 (age 73); Lummi Indian Reservation, Whatcom County, Washington, U.S.
- Other names: Praying Wolf, Tse Sealth, Sit ki kadem, Jewell Praying Wolf James
- Education: University of Washington
- Occupations: Wood carver, author, environmental activist

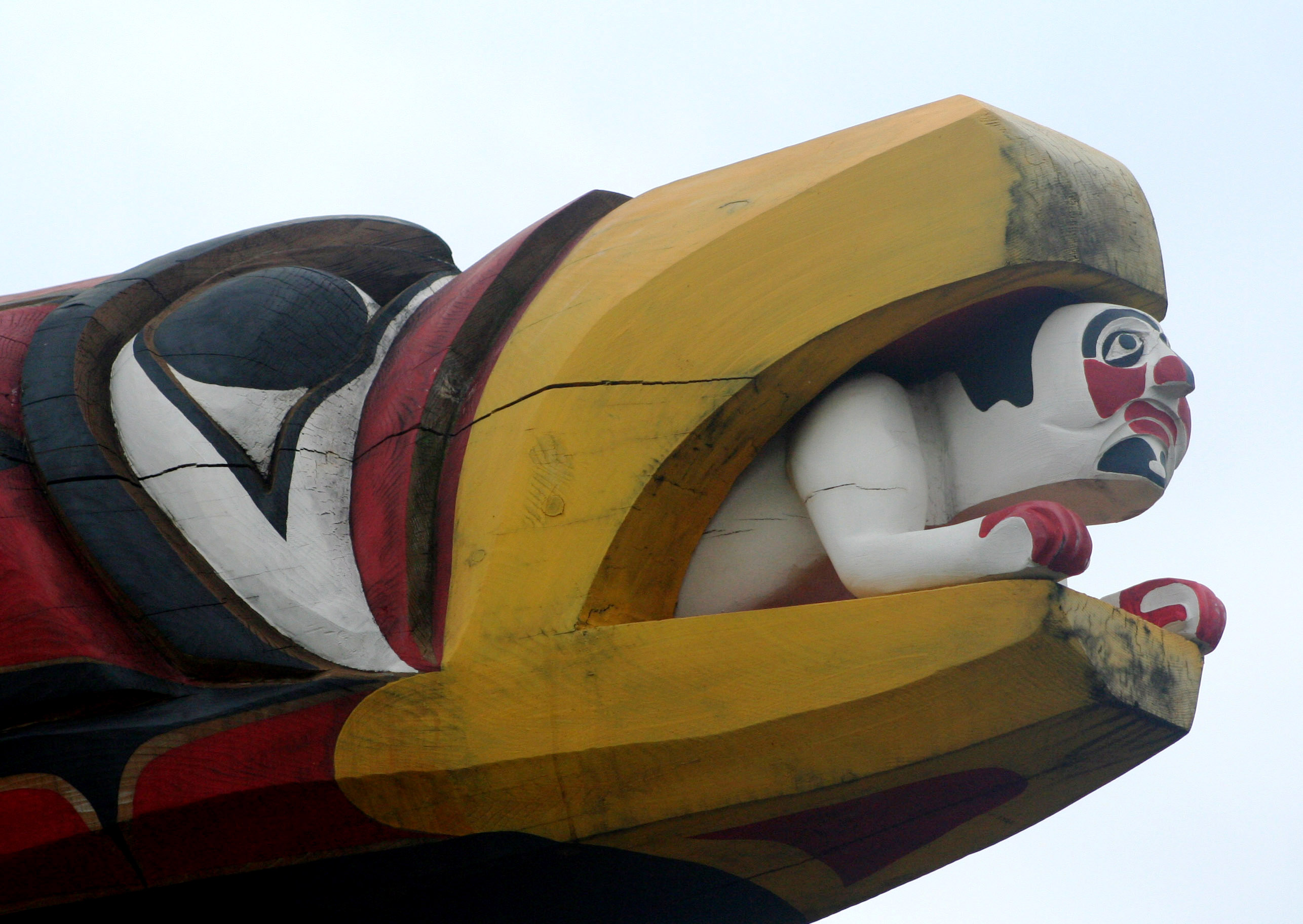
Lummi healing totem pole (up-close view, in honor of the victims of September 11th)

Jewell James (born February 2, 1953; also known as Praying Wolf, Sit ki kadem, and Tse Sealth) is a Lummi Nation master carver of totem poles, author, and an environmental activist. He is a descendant of Chief Seattle.

== Early life and education ==
Jewell James was born on February 2, 1953, on the Lummi Indian Reservation, west of Bellingham. He is a descendant of Chief Seattle, the namesake of Seattle, Washington. His brother Dale James studied wood carving prior to his own study.

James attended the University of Washington in the early 1970s, studying political science. While in college he studied carving under Marvin Oliver, and later apprenticed under him.

== Career ==
James is part of the Treaty Protection Task Force for the Lummi Nation. He has also served as the Lummi leader of cultural diversity. In 1994, James was a leader in the first pan-tribal meeting, which featured 300 tribes conversing with President Bill Clinton at the White House. He is a leader of the House of Tears Carvers, a group of wood carvers from Lummi.

James carves totems from ancient western red cedar trees, these totems are sacred objects in Lummi culture and help with healing and storytelling. Prior to the cutting of these trees, a prayers ceremony happens. The creation of a single totem can take up to 1,000 hours of labor, in order to carve and paint. James presented two totem poles to the Pentagon in dedication to the lives lost there on September 11, 2001, which were later moved to Congressional Cemetery's 9/11 Memorial Grove. James is featured in the documentary film A Common Destiny: Walking in Both Worlds (1990; Mystic Fire Video).

In July 2021, the House of Tears participated in the "Red Road to DC", where a single Lummi-carved 25-ft tall totem pole was created to inspire the United States government to protect Native American sacred sites. The "Red Road to DC" totem traveled for two weeks to Washington D.C. making stop overs across the nation and inspiring local prayer ceremonies.

== Publications ==
- James, Jewell Praying Wolf; James, Darby Anne (1996). Chief Seattle and the Indian in the Moon: The Legend of Star Child and Mud Child. Dial Books for Young Readers. ISBN 978-0803716131.

== See also ==
- List of Native American artists
