= Big Beaver Totem Pole =

Outdoor totem pole sculpture in Chicago, Illinois

The Story of Big Beaver
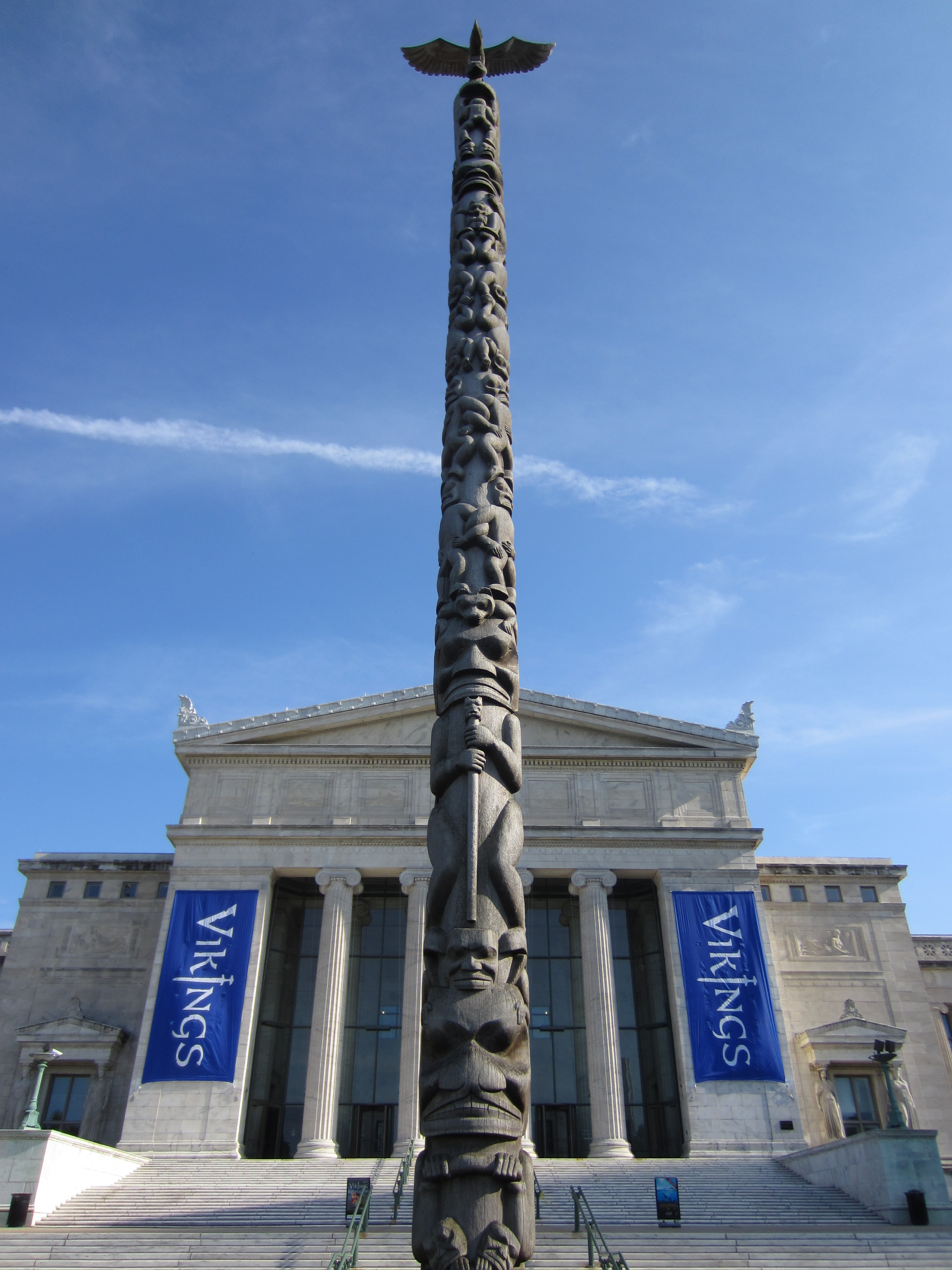
- The sculpture in 2015
- Artist: Norman Tait
- Year: 1982
- Medium: Totem Pole carved out of a cedar tree
- Dimensions: 17 m (55 ft)
- Location: Field Museum of Natural History, Chicago, Illinois, U.S.
- Coordinates: 41.86721°N 87.61705°W

Big Beaver Totem Pole (also known as Story of Big Beaver, or simply Big Beaver) is a 55-foot (16.8-meter) tall outdoor totem pole sculpture by Norman Tait, of the Nisga'a people of British Columbia, located in front of the north entrance to the Field Museum of Natural History in Chicago, Illinois.

The totem pole was carved out of a cedar tree donated by the Council of Forest Industries of British Columbia, according to the plaque, and was commissioned by the Women's Board of the Field Museum of Natural History to commemorate the 1982 opening of a permanent exhibit about the Maritime Peoples of the Arctic and Northwest Coast. It was erected on April 24, 1982 (around the time the exhibit opened) in an event involving a traditional Nisga'a tribal ceremony with costumes and dancing sponsored by the Field Museum.

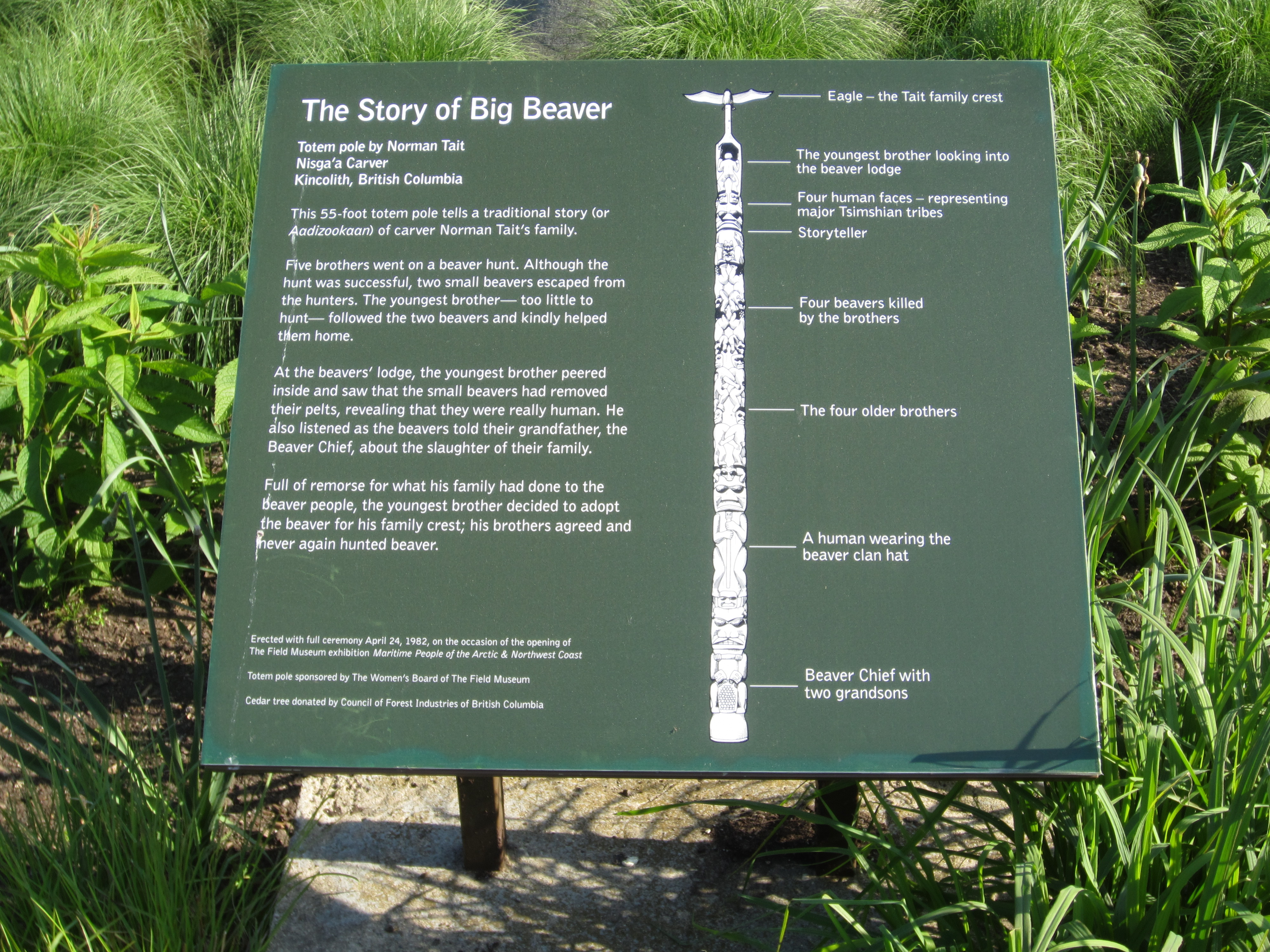
Plaque for the sculpture

== See also ==
- 1982 in art
- List of public art in Chicago
- List of totem poles
