= Freda Diesing School of Northwest Coast Art =

Art school in Terrace, BC, Canada

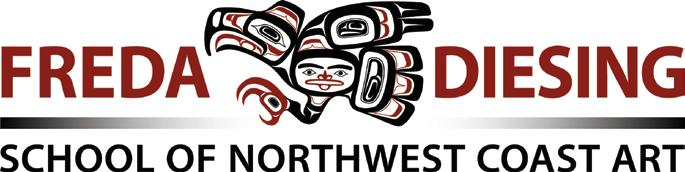
Freda Diesing School of Northwest Coast Art

The Freda Diesing School of Northwest Coast Art focuses on traditional First Nations Pacific Northwest Coast Art offering Fine Arts certificates and diplomas.

Named after the Haida artist Freda Diesing, one of the first female carvers on the modern Northwest coast, aka Kant Wuss, Skill-kew-wat and Wee-hwe-doasl, who was born in the Sadsugohilanes Clan of the Haida in British Columbia to Flossie and Frank Johnson. Her Haida name, Skill-kew-wat, translates roughly as Magical Little Woman.

At the age of 42, she undertook woodcarving apprenticeships under artists including Robert Davidson (artist). In 2002, she received an National Aboriginal Achievement Award and honorary doctorate from the University of Northern British Columbia.

The school was opened in the Fall of 2006 by one of Freda's students Dempsey Bob and two of his nephews, Ken McNeil and Stan Bevan. The school focuses on carving in the Northern Style, with drawing, painting, art history and tool-making courses supporting the carving component of the school. Dempsey Bob received a Lifetime Achievement Award in Aboriginal Art in 2007 The school has selected Indigenous artists from outside Northwest BC for residencies, including a Maori artist from New Zealand.

The school frequently invites guest speakers for presentations. These speakers have included Robert Davidson, Roy Henry Vickers, Keith Smartch, Bill McLennan, Greg Schauff, and representatives from the Royal BC Museum, the Canadian Museum of Civilization and other institutions representing the arts and culture in the Northwest Coast.

The First Nations Fine Arts program is unique as a university credit program, recognized by Emily Carr University of Art and Design, that focuses on First Nations art and culture in a context where the culture and people who originated it live today.

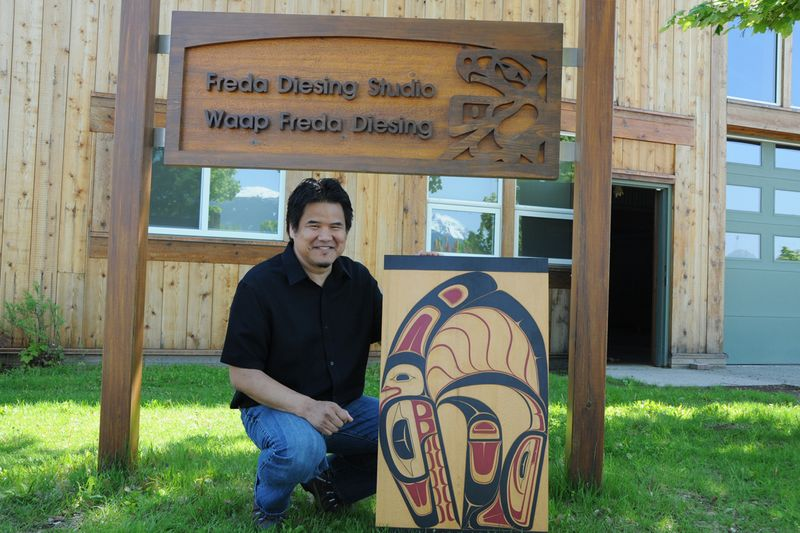
2011 - Instructor Dean Heron with killer whale carving made by artist Cliff Bolton

As of September 2010, the school had 31 graduates. In the preceding years the numbers of graduates has grown, and the art First Nations Fine Arts program added a third year. The students and instructors of the school have won numerous awards. In 2012 Skeena Reece won the Annual BC Creative Achievement Awards for First Nations' Art. In 2013, Dempsey Bob was appointed Officer of the Order of Canada, Ken McNeil was a recipient of a 2013 BC Creative Achievement Awards for First Nations' Art. In 2018 Nakita Trimble won the BC First Nations Art Fulmer Award. In 2019 Stephanie Anderson was the recipient of the YVR Art Foundation scholarship award. In 2021 founding member Dempsey Bob won the Governor General's Award for Visual Media and Art, instructor Stan Bevan was awarded the Fulmer Award in First Nations Art by the province of BC and Jessica McCallum Miller was awarded the Lieutenant Governor's Medal for Inclusion, Democracy and Reconciliation

In 2024, the school reunited Kwakwaka'wakw artist Lou-ann Neel with a 100-year-old totem pole model carved by her grandmother Ellen Neel

In 2025, artists Stephanie Anderson, Ellen Neel, Arlene Ness and Veronica Waechter had their art featured, along with works of Freda Diesing at the "Curve! Women Carvers on the Northwest Coast" exhibition at the Audain Art Museum.

== Notable Alumni and Faculty ==
- Dempsey Bob, Founding member, Northwest Coast woodcarver and sculptor of Tahltan and Tlingit First Nations descent
- Skeena Reece, Canadian First Nations artist
