= The Stanford Legacy =

Totem pole made by Don Yeomans

- The sculpture in 2018
- Artist: Don Yeomans
- Location: Stanford, California, U.S.
- 37.424679°N 122.16752°W

The Stanford Legacy is a totem pole by artist Don Yeomans, installed on the Stanford University campus in Stanford, California, United States. The 40-foot (12 m), 4,200-pound (1,900 kg) artwork was installed outside the law school on May 6, 2002. It exhibits a traditional Haida style and was carved from an approximately 400-year-old Western red cedar. The totem was cleaned and repainted in 2013.
