= Boo-Qwilla =

Totem pole by Art Thompson

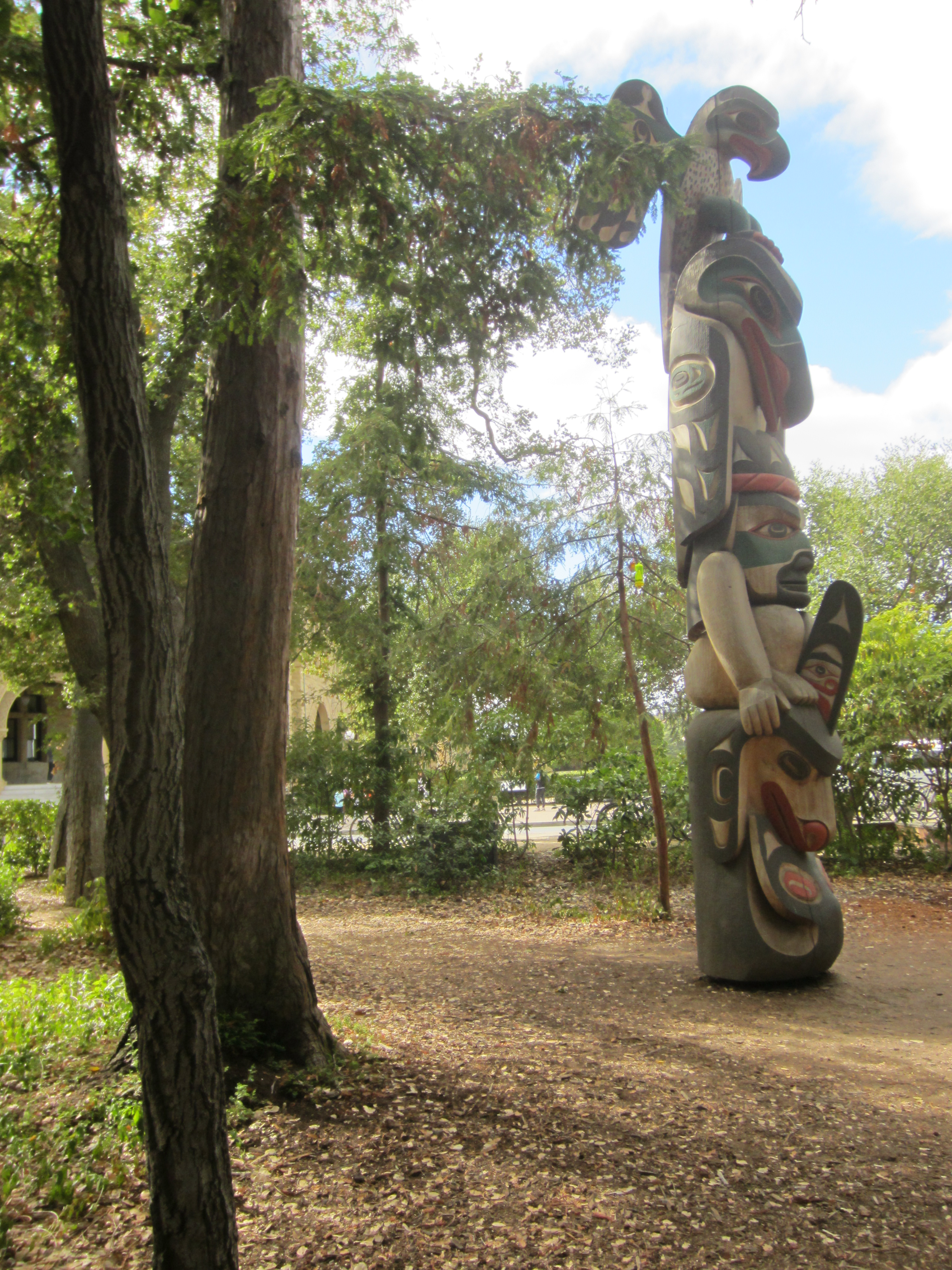
- The sculpture in 2018
- Artist: Art Thompson
- Year: 1995
- Location: Stanford, California, United States
- Coordinates: 37.428368°N 122.16797°W

Boo-Qwilla is a totem pole created by Art Thompson, installed on the Stanford University campus in Stanford, California, United States. The sculpture was installed in Dohrmann Grove, near Hoover Tower, in 1995. It was cleaned and repainted in 2013.
