= Don Yeomans =

Haida artist

Don Yeomans (born 1958) is a Haida artist from Prince Rupert, British Columbia, best known for his silkscreen art. His art is in the collection of Museum of Anthropology at UBC and on permanent display at the Canadian Museum of History.

== Early life ==
Yeomans was born in 1958 in Prince Rupert, British Columbia, and at the age of twelve years was taught to carve by his aunt Freda Diesing. Robert Davidson and Bill Reid taught him to carve.

In the 1980s, Yeomans undertook a two-year apprenticeship under Gitxzan artist Phil Janzé.

== Career ==
Yeomans is best known for his silk screen printing many of which are amongst the 30 pieces of his art kept in the collection of the Museum of Anthropology at UBC.

His 1983 Thunderbird Spirit mask was featured in Gary Wyatt's 1994 book Spirit Faces and was one of many that were forged and mass produced in Indonesia. The forgeries were identified by Montreal art dealer Stephen Lazarous.

His 1987 piece Gunarh and the Whale is on display at the Canadian Museum of History.

In 1998, Yeoman carved and painted the burial chest of his former mentor Bill Reid.

He carved the 40-foot-tall The Stanford Legacy totem pole in 2002, which is located in Stanford Law School.

Yeomans is partly the subject of the book chapter The impulse to create: Daina Augaitis in conversations with Robert Davidson, Michael Nicoll Yahgulanaas and Don Yeoman, one of eleven chapters of the 2008 book Raven travelling : two centuries of Haida art by Daina Augaitis, Marianne Jones, and Peter Macnair.

== Gallery ==
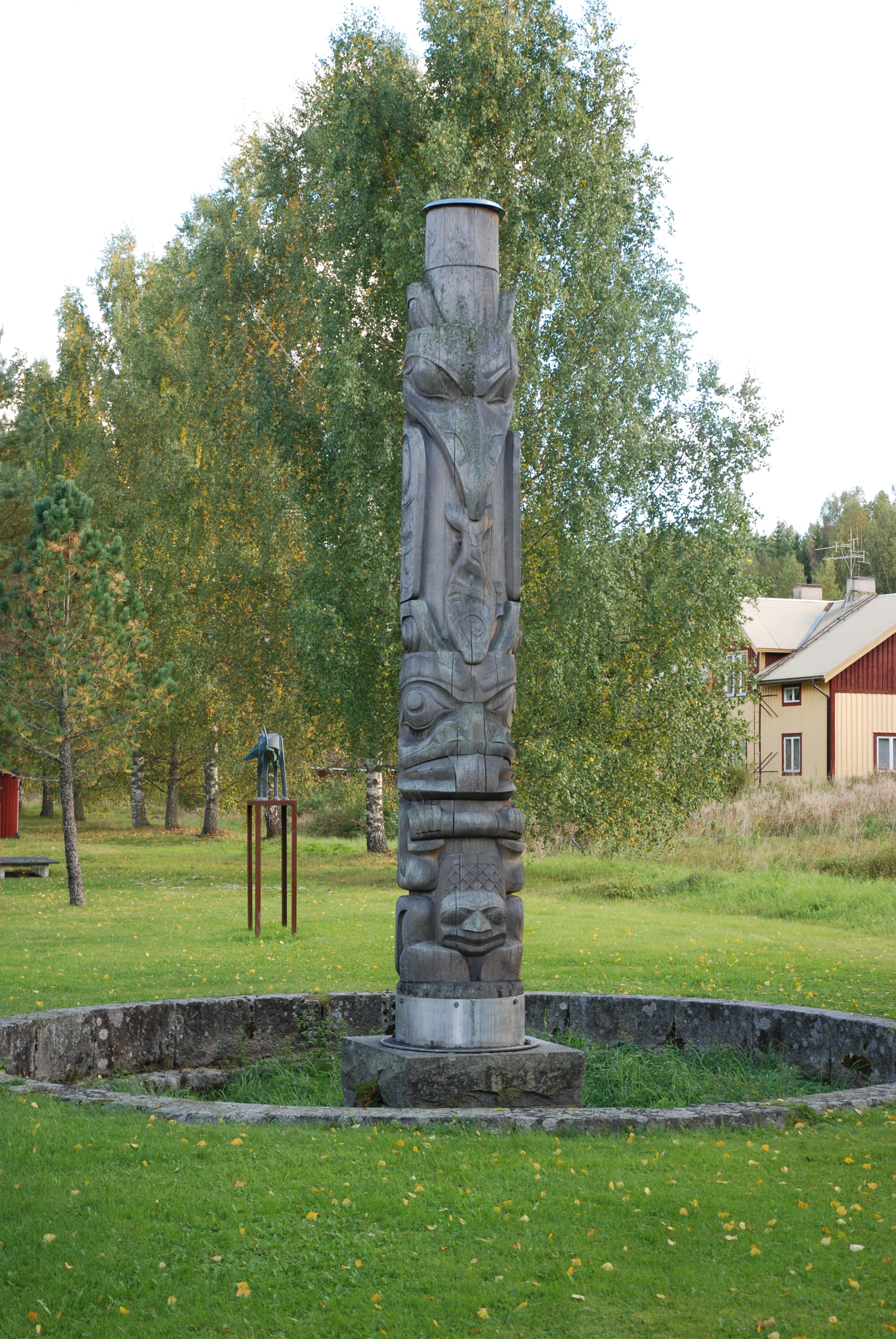
Yeomans's Haida Totem Pole, Galleri Astley, Uttersberg, Sweden

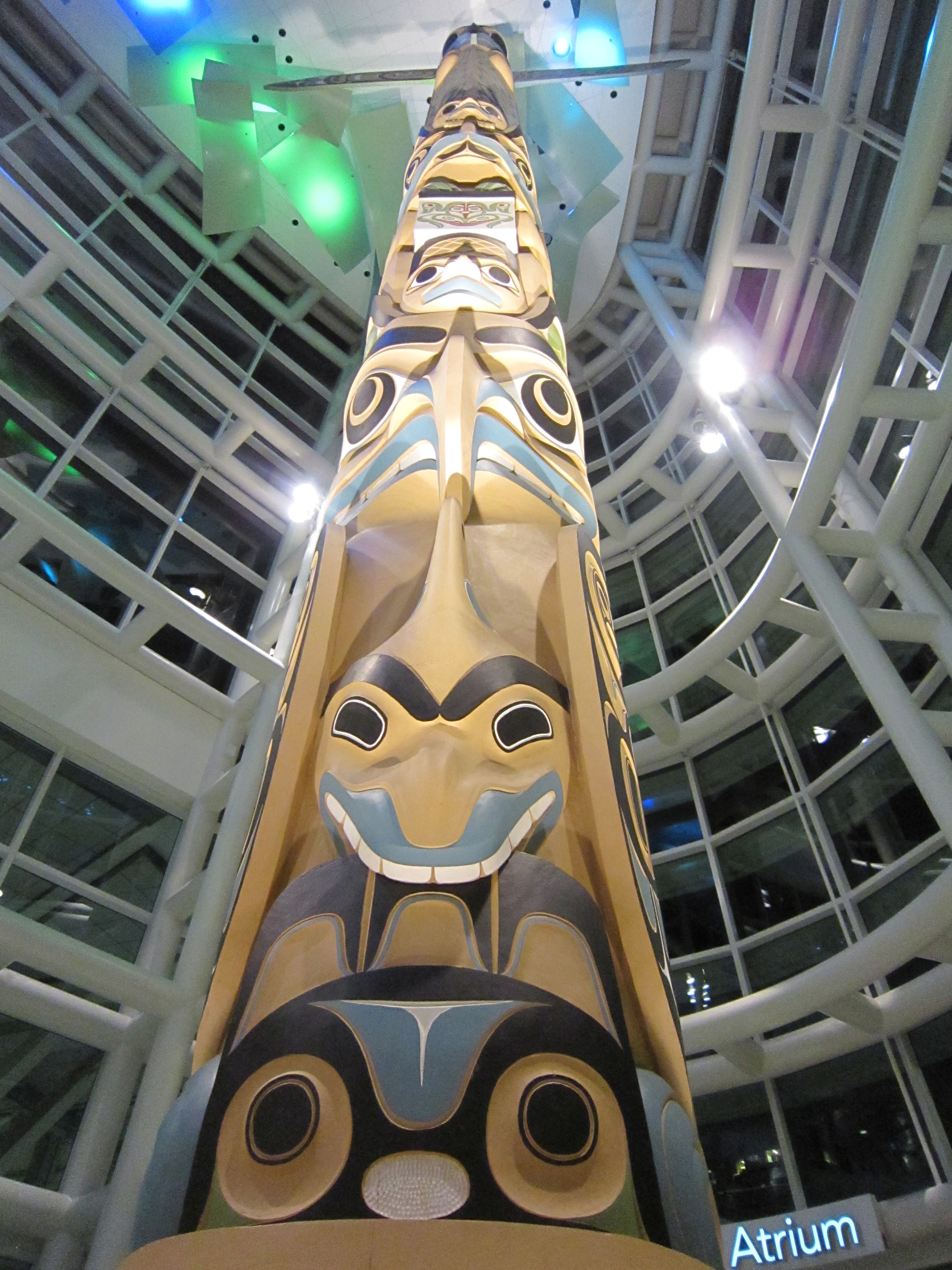
Yeomans's Totem Pole at Vancouver International Airport

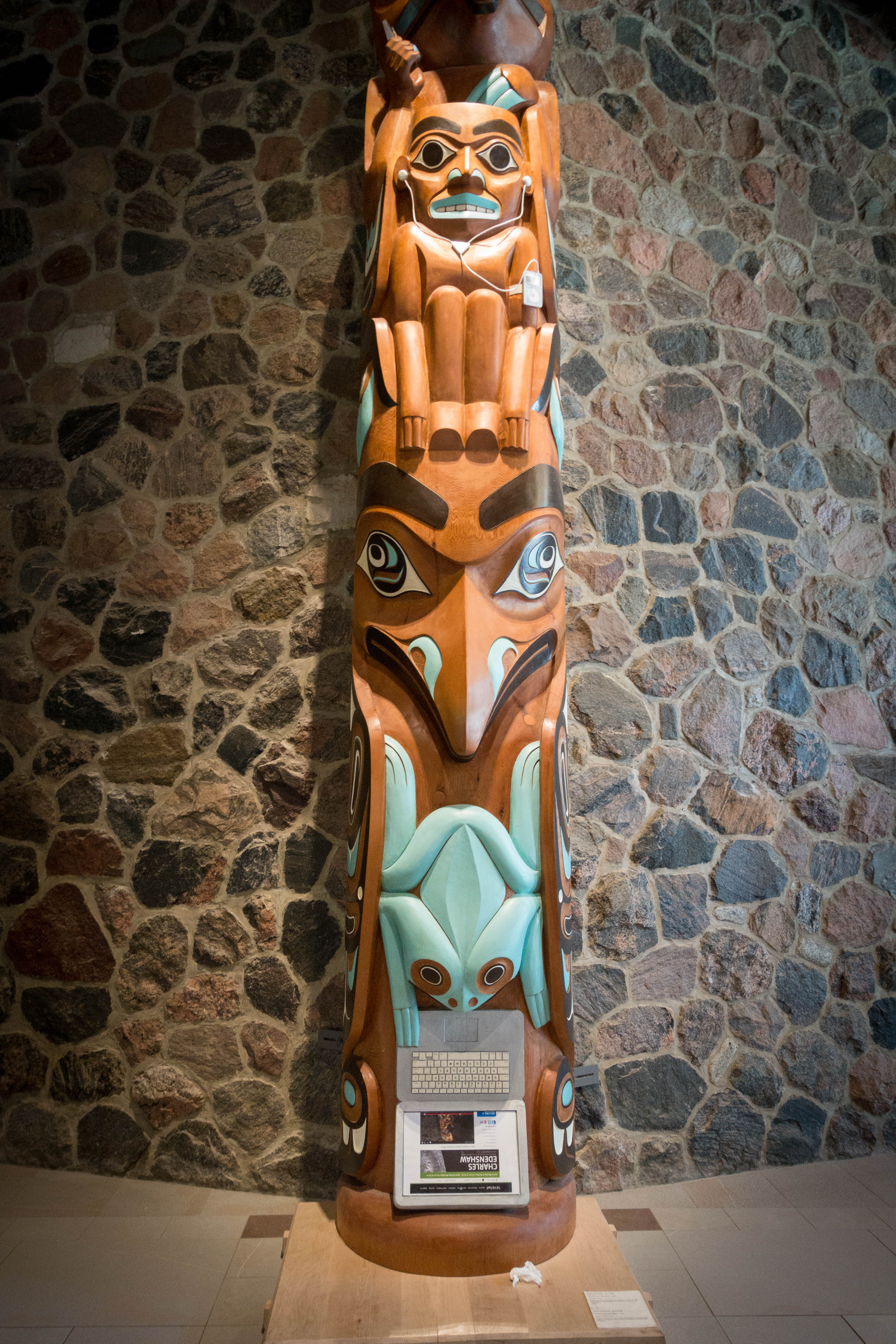
Yeomans: Where Cultures Meet, 2009

== Family life ==
Yeomans is married to his wife Trace and they have a son Kyran and a daughter Crystal. He collaborates with all three on art.
