= Wellbriety totem pole =

Totem pole in Sitka, Alaska

- Artist: Wayne Price
- Year: 2006
- Weight: 4000 pounds
- Location: Sitka, Alaska; 57°03′16″N 135°21′31″W

The Kootéeyaa Project Wellbriety totem pole, also known as the Wellbriety Kootéeyaa and given the Tlingit name Yei éek kwa néix is a totem pole in Sitka, Alaska. Created by the Southeast Alaska Regional Health Consortium and White Bison, the totem pole was designed to symbolize healing and contains references to health-related issues such as substance abuse. Carving, led by Wayne Price, took place over six months and the totem pole was installed in front of the SEARHC Community Health Services building on October 16, 2006.

== Description and location ==
The pole symbolizes healing and health; Its Tlingit language name is Yei éek kwa néix, meaning "You are going to get well" and its design references health-related issues such as substance abuse, diabetes, and cancer.

On the top of the pole is a raven, the creator in Tlingit culture. The raven has a metal beak in its ring and carries the moon, and represents hope. Beneath the raven is a blank space, then a shaman or bear standing over his helper, a wolf; the wolf represents bringing people into recovery. At the base of the pole is a Tlingit medicine woman, carrying a basket of plants. There is a tear on her cheek; she is in mourning for those who have succumbed to addiction. Other Tlingit symbols of health are depicted on the plant, including Hudson Bay tea, rattles, and traditional medicinal plants such as soapberries, rose hips, and devil's club.

The Wellbriety pole is 4,000 pounds and located in front of the Southeast Alaska Regional Health Consortium Community Health Services building in Sitka, Alaska.

== Carving and installation ==
The Kootéeyaa Project was originally started in 2004 by Roberta Kitka, a Tlingit woman working as a drug abuse specialist for the Southeast Alaska Regional Health Consortium (SEARHC) and who had previously worked with White Bison. White Bison is an organization in Colorado and organizers of the Wellbriety movement, a Native American drug recovery program. The name Wellbriety is derived from the words "wellness" and "sobriety". Robert Kitka worked as chairwoman of the project, which was sponsored by SEARHC.

Carving, led by Wayne Price, began in April, 2006 at SEARHC, and took six months. While he was carving the pole, a series of healing circles were held. Each circle had ten people, and they discussed issues affected Sitka such as substance abuse, mental health and mental illness, disease, homelessness, and suicide. People at the carving were allowed to provide limited assistance to Price, removing small woodchips. Price, who had also dealt with addiction, invited observers to take woodchips and write the names of loved ones who had succumbed.

The pole was installed in front of the SEARHC Community Health Services building on October 16, 2006, in a pole raising led by Price and organized by SEARHC. 140 members of the community, including elders from the opposing Raven and Eagle moieties carried the pole to its location, where it was lifted into place. Beneath the pole were placed a Wellbriety token and a Sacagawea dollar. At the raising, Kitka was given President's Gumboot Award by SEARHC for her work organizing the totem pole project; later that month, White Bison gave her their Breast Lifetime Achievement award at a Wellbriety conference.

Two students at Haines High School created a sixteen minute documentary about the totem pole and submitted it to Sundance. They interviewed Wayne Price about his life and work and titled the film "Kooteeya: Journey to Wellness".

== See also ==
- List of totem poles
