= Norman Tait =

Canadian artist (1941-2016)

- Born: May 20, 1941; Kincolith (Gingolx) on the Nass River in BC
- Died: May 21, 2016 (aged 75)
- Citizenship: Nisga'a First Nations
- Known for: sculptor

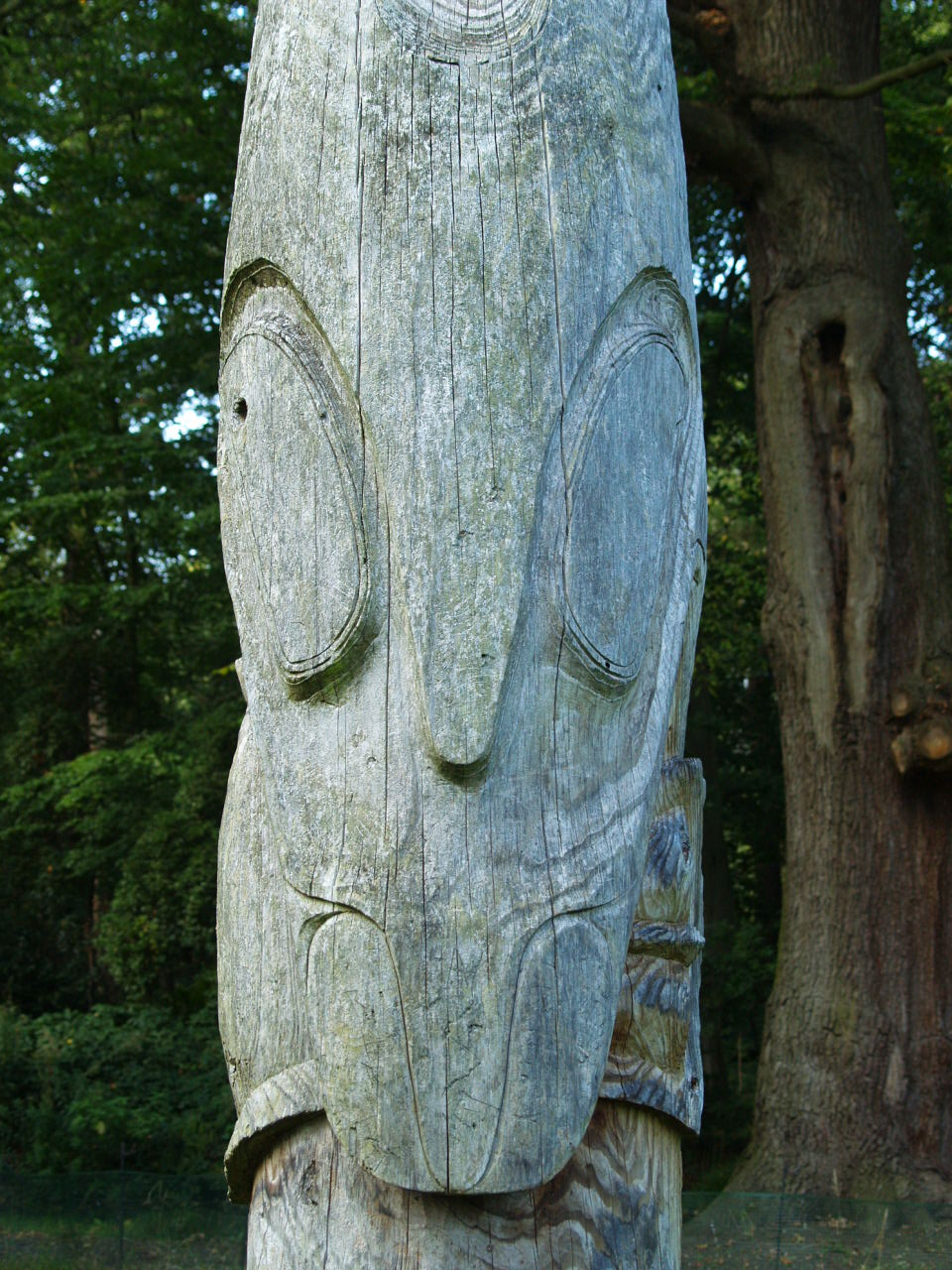
Carving in Bushy Park, London, UK

Norman Tait (May 20, 1941 – May 21, 2016) was a Nisga'a First Nations sculptor and totem pole carver from northwestern British Columbia, Canada.

== Background ==
Norman Tait was born in Kincolith (Gingolx) on the Nass River in BC. His father Josiah Tait, was also a carver, and his great-grandfather was Chief Alfred Watson Mountain, wahlin Sganism Sim'oogit. His brothers Alver Tait and Robert "Chip" Tait were also accomplished carvers, as was his son Isaac, and his nephews Ron Telek, and Wayne Young.

Tait was a member of the House of Luuya'as, of the Lax Xsgiik (Eagle tribe) and has held the hereditary Chieftainship names of Na'ax-lax, Gawaakhl, and Naawootkw Lik'inskw lax galts'ap, the last meaning "Grizzly Bear Coming onto the Village." He named one of the two Capilano Mall totems (North Vancouver, BC), Naawootkw Lik'inkskw lax galst'ap. A name he held at the time the totems were raised, in 1985.

Tait attended residential school in Alberta and later completed high school in Prince Rupert, British Columbia.

== Art career ==
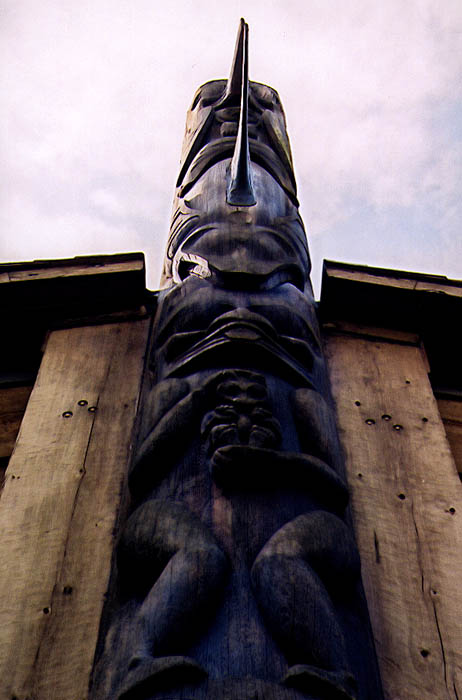
Totem at Vancouver Education College

When he began carving in 1971, Tait sought out Nisga'a artifacts that he could study since there were no living Nisga'a master carvers for him to study. He worked with his father to raise the first Nisga'a totem pole in over 50 years, and his first totem, for the District of Port Edward. He later studied under the tutelage of the Haida carvers Freda Diesing and Gerry Marks.

During his career as a carver, Tait carved 39 totem poles. Many of these stand in British Columbia, including poles in Port Edward, Lax Kw'alaams, and Alert Bay. As well as a Panel in the Gymnasium in Hartley Bay. Five of his poles are in Vancouver, including poles at the University of British Columbia, Stanley Park, Capilano Mall, and the Native Education Centre.

He carved The Story of Big Beaver totem pole, a 16.8-metre (55 ft) pole installed in 1982 at the entrance to the Field Museum of Natural History in Chicago. In 1992, Tait raised a totem in Bushy Park in London, England. Tait raised a totem pole to commemorate the opening of the Nisga'a Lisims Government building in Gitlaxt’aamiks, BC (New Aiyansh), "Goothl Lisims", which translates as "the heart of the Nass". He has also carved poles standing in Osaka, Japan, Arizona, and Germany, as well as many private collections.

Tait had a breakthrough in 1977 when the UBC Museum of Anthropology hosted a solo exhibit of 125 of his works. At the time, First Nations carvers were exhibited in group shows. The same year he designed the Nisga'a dollar.

Tait was known for the realistic detailing of his sculptured carving, his signature moon masks, two-dimensional doors, and precious metal jewellery.

In the late 70s, a life size bronze cast statue of Norman was commissioned for the Royal British Columbia Museum, Victoria, BC. It remains on display in the First Peoples exhibit. Although Norman was in his 30s at the time the statue was cast, it was age progressed to what he was thought to look like in his 50s.

In 1985, Norman was invited to traditionally welcome the Maori people with the arrival of their exhibit, Te Maori, to North America. He brought his parents and his family to accompany him in this historic greeting. There were 60 Maori people accompanying this exhibit, and were welcomed by a group of 12, Norman Tait and his family of carvers and dancers.

Tait worked with his carving partner, Lucinda Turner. He began teaching Turner in 1991, and they subsequently collaborated on many carvings, including two major commissions for the Vancouver Stock Exchange. They also opened the working art gallery, Wilp's Tsaak Gallery: House of the Mischievous Man in West Vancouver.

Tait was one of 5 artists; Art Thompson, Calvin Hunt, Norman Tait, John Livingston, and Don Yeomans, to carve the Chancellor's Chair of University of Victoria, Victoria, BC.

In 2015, the West Vancouver Museum held a retrospective on Tait's work, his first solo exhibition since 1977. He launched this show in the Nisga'a Museum, Laxgalts'ap.

_{He shook the world awake.}

"The world lost an amazing man and an incredible talent when we lost my father. He came up fast in his career, and set the bar high for those that came behind him. He wanted to inspire those to go further. His footprint put the Nisga'a Nation on map." -Valerie Tait
