= Aldona Jonaitis =

American writer

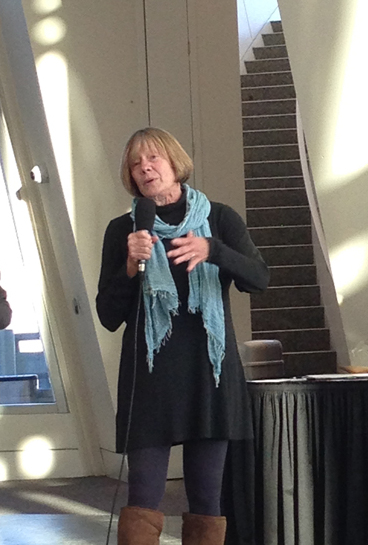
- Born: November 27, 1948 (age 77); Flushing, Queens, New York, USA
- Education: Stony Brook University (Bachelor's) Columbia University (MA, PhD)

Aldona Jonaitis (born 1948) is an American art historian, author, and director emerita of the University of Alaska Museum of the North. She has written several books focussing on Indigenous Northwest Coast art.

A professor at Stony Brook University in the 1970s and 1980s, she was hired to work as the vice president for public programs at the American Museum of Natural History in 1989. While there, she produced the 1991 exhibition Chiefly Feasts, a display on potlaches as they have been celebrated by the Kwakwakaʼwakw people. She moved to Alaska in 1993 after being hired by the University of Alaska Museum of the North to work as their director and the associated University of Alaska, Fairbanks, to teach anthropology classes. Upon her initial retirement from the museum in 2009, the university made her a director emerita. She came back in 2012 to work as interim director, before retiring again in 2015. Jonaitis has received an Governor's Awards for the Humanities in 2015 for her work in Alaska, and a Curators Committee Award for Excellence by the American Alliance of Museums for her work curating Chiefly Feasts.

As an author, her books include Art of the Northern Tlingit (1986), From the Land of the Totem Poles (1988), The Yuquot Whalers' Shrine (1999), The Totem Pole: An Intercultural History.(2010, with Aaron Glass) and Discovering Totem Poles (2012). She has also edited several books, including Chiefly Feasts (1991), Looking North (1998), and Unsettling Native Art Histories on the Northwest Coast (2020).

== Early life and education ==
Aldona Claire Jonaitis was born on November 27, 1948, in Flushing, Queens, to parents Thomas and Demie (née Genaitis) Jonaitis, both teachers. Growing up in New York City, Jonaitis became interested in Northwest Coast art as a child, after visiting museums such as the American Museum of Natural History with her parents.

At the age of sixteen, Jonaitis enrolled in Stony Brook University, where she studied art history. She graduated with a bachelor's degree in 1969, then moved to Columbia University to continue her studies. She graduated with a master's in art history and archaeology in 1973. With a dissertation on art in the homes of Tlingit shamans and Tlingit royalty (The relationships between the social and shamanic art of the Tlingit Indians of Alaska), she graduated from Columbia with her PhD in 1977. That dissertation later became the foundation for her book Art of the Northern Tlingit.

== Career ==
=== Stony Brook University and Art of the Northern Tlingit ===
After graduating, Jonaitis was hired by Stony Brook University (SBU) to teach art history. She worked at the university from 1973 to 1989 as a lecturer to professor of arts and, later, as chair of their art department. She also worked in administration at SBU; from 1984 to 1986, she was an associate provost, and, from 1986 to 1989, she worked as a vice provost for undergraduate studies. During this time, she was also a founding member of the Native American Art Studies Association, becoming a member of its board in 1985, and, in 1986, published Art of the Northern Tlingit with the University of Washington Press. Based on her thesis, Jonaitis later criticized the book as she felt it "represents the old paradigm of art scholarship which is white people coming in and interpreting the art of Native people." Building on the work of anthropologists such as Claude Lévi-Strauss and Victor Turner, Art of the Northern Tlingit is about the study of Tlingit art, beginning in the 1800s; in it, Jonaitis analyzes symbolism argues that Tlingit artwork is reflective of social and religious hierarchies. The first part of the book contained photographs of artefacts, while the second part contained nine chapters on the culture and art history of the Tlingit people, especially those in Klukwan, Alaska. The book was based on theoretical study rather than fieldwork; in a review for American Indian Quarterly, Wallace M. Olson was critical of what he perceived to be Jonaitis's reliance on sources and observers who were no fluent in the Tlingit language. He noted that the bibliography revealed only one Tlingit name; all others were non-Tlingit. Though disagreeing with come of her conclusions, Olson praised Jonaitis's use of photographs while a review in Art Documentation described the images as "few in number and of varying quality". Anthropologist Marjorie Halpin described the book as "almost a parody of the art-historical method", describing the divisions Jonaititis drew between religious and secular art in Northern Tlingit culture as "outmoded and, I think, incorrect". Art historian Victoria Wyatt was critical of how she said Jonaitis had "based her primary ethnographic information heavily on the limited extant sources"; Anthropologist and linguist Wayne Suttles disagreed with her conclusions, but said it was a "fine book that seems sure to become a classic on Northwest Coast art". Art historian Janet Catherine Berlo praised the book and Jonaitis's writing, though felt she could have been more opinionated with it came to commentating on the views of other scholars.

=== American Museum of Natural History ===
In 1988, the same year she was working as a research assistant at the department of anthropology at the American Museum of Natural History (AMNH), Jonaitis's eight-chapter book From the Land of Totem Poles was published by the AMNH and the University of Washington Press. A follow up to Objects of Bright Pride by Allen Wardwell, From the Land of Totem Poles was first book about only the museum's Northwest Coast collection. It contained a history of the AMNH itself, an illustrated catalogue of the museum's collection, and, perhaps more so, a history of the collection's acquisition during the latter half of the 1800s and the early 1900s. The volume also contained substantial material on the career of anthropologist Franz Boas and nearly 100 color photographs of objects in the museum's collection, some of which had never been published before. Accompanying them were around 90 historical photographs, including of the objects themselves, from the period they had been collected in. Many of these archival photographs had been taken by Edward Dossetter, while the modern images were taken by Stephen Myers.

The illustrations used in the book were praised by several reviewers. The prose, interspersed with historical anecdotes, was described by Victoria Wyatt in African Arts as being in a "romantic" style which "reflects nineteenth century sensibilities" and "from the perspective of the institution [the AMNH]". She also criticized what she felt to be misleading statements or inaccuracies, given portions of Jonaitis's history on Alaskan governance and a claim that Alexander Andreyevich Baranov had paid a ransom to Tlingit people for Russian captives, when he had actually paid that ransom to an English captain, as examples. Wyatt also stated that she believed the book did not provide enough concrete dates of events for the reader to properly understand them. An Ethnohistory reviewer described it as a "lovely and disturbing volume", feeling that Jonaitis had sidestepped discussing the removal of the artefacts from the cultures and people responsible for their creation. A Publishers Weekly review criticized the book for having only "a few brief, scattered references to totem poles", an example of how the reviewer felt the book did not give enough context on the artefacts. In a review published in the Telegraph-Journal, George Stanley described From the Land of Totem Poles as "interesting" and "beautiful", but said he ended up "wondering if the author really grasped the cultural significance and the inherent sadness of, say, a mortuary pole uprooted from its original site and re-erected within the alien walls of a museum".

Jonaitis left SBU in 1989 to become the vice-president for public programs at the AMNH. While in this role, she curated the travelling exhibition Chiefly Feasts: The Enduring Kwakiutl Potlatch, sponsored by the museum and containing their collection of Northwest Coast Art. The exhibition itself, was about the celebration of potlatches by the Kwakwakaʼwakw. Jonaitis had visited her first potlatch in 1989 after a conversation with Gloria Cranmer Webster about a potential exhibition on the subject, with artefacts collected by Webster's great-grandfather, George Hunt. Webster responded by saying "I don't see how in this day and age the museums still want to put together exhibits about potlatches with curators who have never been to a potlatch". Jonaitis invited Webster to work as a guest curator on the exhibit, where she created a segment on modern potlatches. The exhibition premiered in 1991, accompanied by an book of the same name, and was met with praise and Jonaitis was awarded the Curators Committee Award for Excellence by the American Alliance of Museums for her work on it.

In 1990, she became the adjunct professor in art history and archeology at Columbia University.

=== Move to Alaska ===
After working on Chiefly Feasts, Jonaitis found herself "tired" of living in New York, and unable to work with Native American people as much as she would like. In 1993, Jonaitis was hired as the director of the University of Alaska Museum of the North (UAMN), taking, according to her, a pay cut. She left her jobs at the AMNH and Columbia moved to Alaska in July of that year, and also began working as a professor of anthropology at the associated University of Alaska, Fairbanks. She was tasked with expanding the museum, a process that could be completed in 2007. She would also work with the Smithsonian Historical Institute.

In 1993, Jonaitis was elected president Native American Art Studies Association. In 1995, the University of Washington Press released a collection of Franz Boas's writings, edited by Jonaitis and with two articles written by her. Marjorie Halpin described the book as "quite thorough", but noted that she omitted to mention Jeanne Cannizzo's 1983 article on the contributions of George Hunt when she claimed that Hunt's "brilliance has never been adequately acknowledged". Jonaitis continued to work at the UAMN and, in 1998, the museum published Looking North: Art from the University of Alaska Museum, an anthology of essays on the museum's collection edited by Jonaitis. The next year, University of Washington Press released The Yuquot Whalers' Shrine, a book the Yuquot Whalers' Shrine, its acquisition by Boas and Hunt, the purchase by the AMNH, and the controversies over that acquisition and the question of reparation.

In 2002, she was a Stanford University distinguished professor of American art history.

Jonaitis retired from the museum in 2009; in May, UAF made her a director emerita. She was replaced by Carol Diebel. The next year, Dover Books re-issued an edition of Franz Boas's Primitive Art; Jonaitis wrote the introduction. That same year, Jonaitis's book The Totem Pole: An Intercultural History was released; written with Aaron Glass, it contained a series of essays written by Northwest Coast art experts and was shortlisted for the 2011 Roderick Haig-Brown Regional Prize.

In 2012, Jonaitis returned to work as interim director after Diebel accepted a job in Hawai‘i. Jonaitis's book Discovering Totem Poles, was published the same year; it contained a guide to totem poles located between Seattle and Juneau, including the Wellbriety pole in Sitka, carved by Wayne Price and the Wooshkeetaan Kootéeyaa.

In 2015, Jonaitis received a Governor's Awards for the Humanities. That same year, she retired from the museum again. Her successor was paleontologist Patrick S. Druckenmiller, appointed in 2018.

Unsettling Native Art Histories, an art history book on the Northwest Coast art edited by Jonaitis and Kathryn Bunn-Marcuse, was released in 2020.

== Personal life ==
Jonaitis married Herman Lebovics in July, 1986. After moving to Alaska, she married Ken Severin.

Jonaitis learned to ride horses when she was eight; when moving to Alaska, in addition to checking whether or not she could get access to the New York Times Sunday edition, she also checked if horses could survive the climate. After retiring from the Museum of the North, Jonaitis purchased a horse and land with her husband, Severin, outside of Fairbanks and built a farm. She also took up painting with pastels and began submitting her work to Alaskan galleries. In 2023, she was selected as an alternate in a show and offered the chance to display her work that summer.

Jonaitis had an elder sister who died in 2007.

== Bibliography ==
Jonaitis writes about the history of Northwest Coast art, described in 1993 by the Anchorage Daily News as "nationally known scholar" of the subject. She has written several books on the history of Native American art.

- Tlingit Halibut Hooks: An Analysis of the Visual Symbols of a Rite of Passage, Anthropological Papers of the American Museum of Natural History, vol. 15, American Museum of Natural History, April 10, 1981
- Art of the Northern Tlingit. University of Washington Press. 1986. OCLC 12108177.
- From the Land of the Totem Poles: The Northwest Coast Indian Art Collection at the American Museum of Natural History. American Museum of Natural History and the University of Washington Press. 1988. ISBN 978-0-295-96572-7.
- Robert Davidson:Eagle of the Dawn. 1993. With Robert Davidson and Marianne Jones
- The Yuquot Whalers' Shrine. University of Washington Press. 1999. ISBN 1-55054-728-3.
- Art of the Northwest Coast. University of Washington Press and Douglas & McIntyre. 2006. ISBN 978-0-295-98636-4.
- The Totem Pole: An Intercultural History. University of Washington Press and Douglas & McIntyre. 2010. ISBN 978-0-295-98962-4. With Aaron Glass.
- Discovering Totem Poles: A Traveler's Guide. University of Washington Press. 2012. ISBN 978-0-295-80688-4. OCLC 949884963.Full access available to users of The Wikipedia Library.

As editor

- Chiefly Feasts: The Enduring Kwakiutl Potlatch. American Museum of Natural History and Douglas & McIntyre. 1991. ISBN 0-295-97114-2.
- Looking North: Art from the University of Alaska Museum. University of Washington Press for the University of Alaska Museum. 1998. ISBN 0-295-97693-4.
- A Wealth of Thought: Franz Boas on Native American Art. Seattle: University of Washington Press. 1995. ISBN 978-0-295-99860-2. Full access available to users of The Wikipedia Library.
- Unsettling Native Art Histories on the Northwest Coast. University of Washington Press. 2020. ISBN 978-0-295-74714-9. Edited with Kathryn Bunn-Marcuse. Full access available to users of The Wikipedia Library.
