= Museum of Northern British Columbia =

Museum in Canada

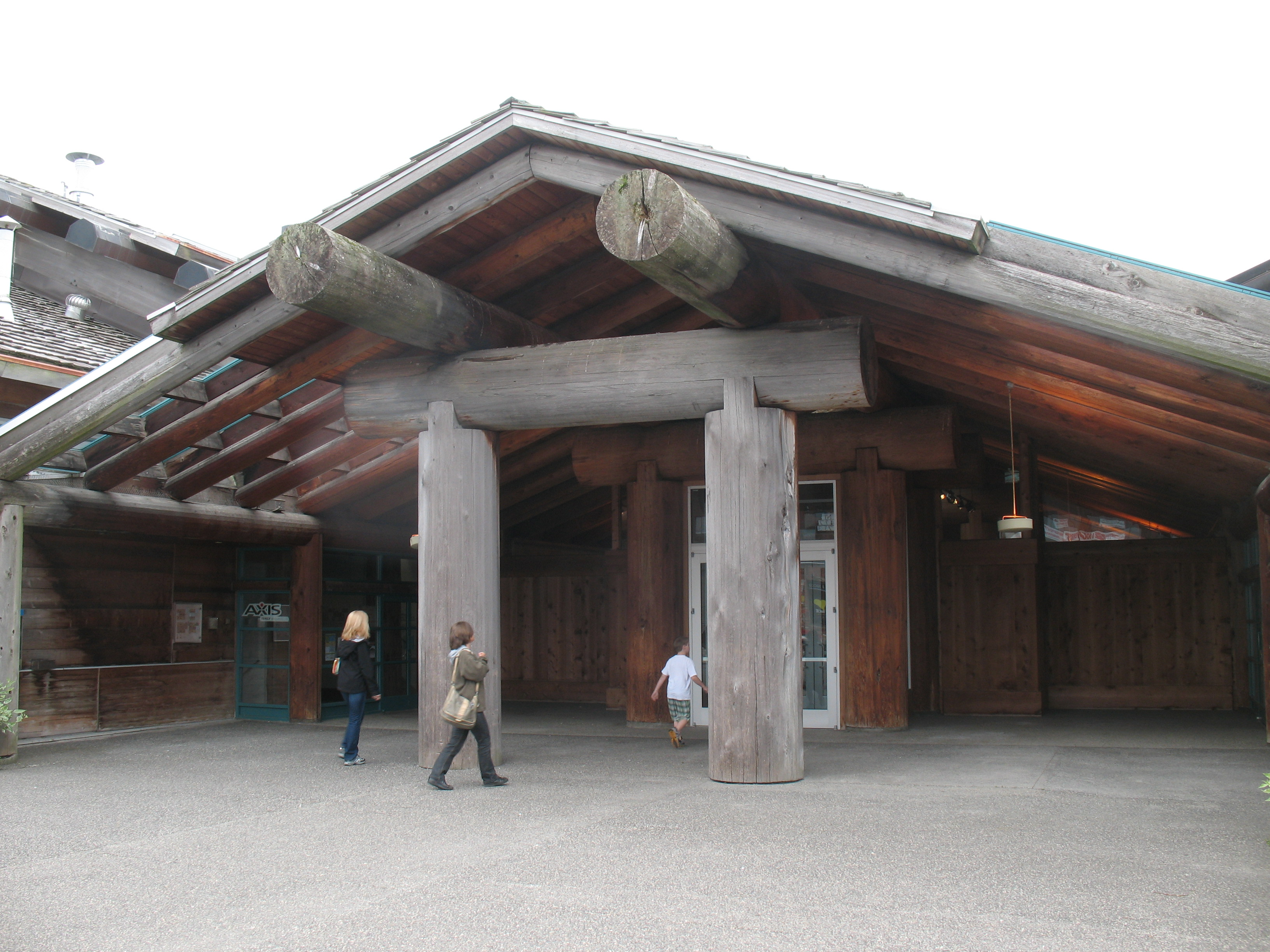
- Established: 1924 (museum society)*
- Location: Prince Rupert, British Columbia
- Coordinates: 54°18′58.2″N 130°19′23.9″W
- Type: Regional / Ethnographic museum
- Owner: Museum of Northern British Columbia Society
- Website: https://www.museumofnorthernbc.com/

The Museum of Northern British Columbia is a museum in Prince Rupert, British Columbia, Canada.

The museum is housed in a large cedar wood longhouse where it collects and exhibits the culture and history of the indigenous peoples of the Pacific Northwest Coast. An emphasis is placed on the local nations the Tsimshian, Haida, Kwakwakaʼwakw, and Tlingit. It was founded in 1924 and now houses thousands of artifacts, maps, photographs and other material. It also organises archaeological and historical tours such as a visit to the Tsimshian village of Metlakatla.

== Gallery ==
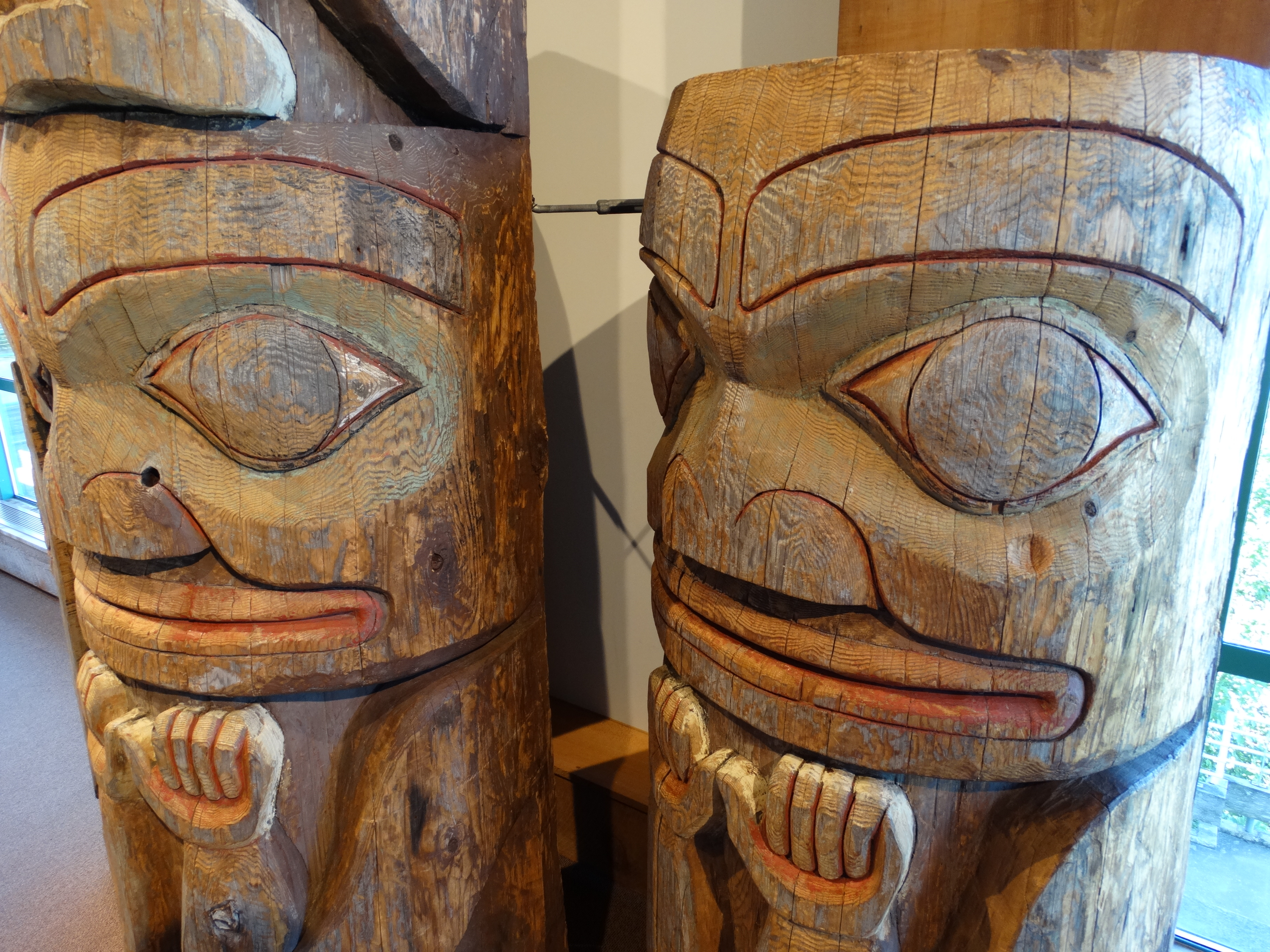
Totem pole
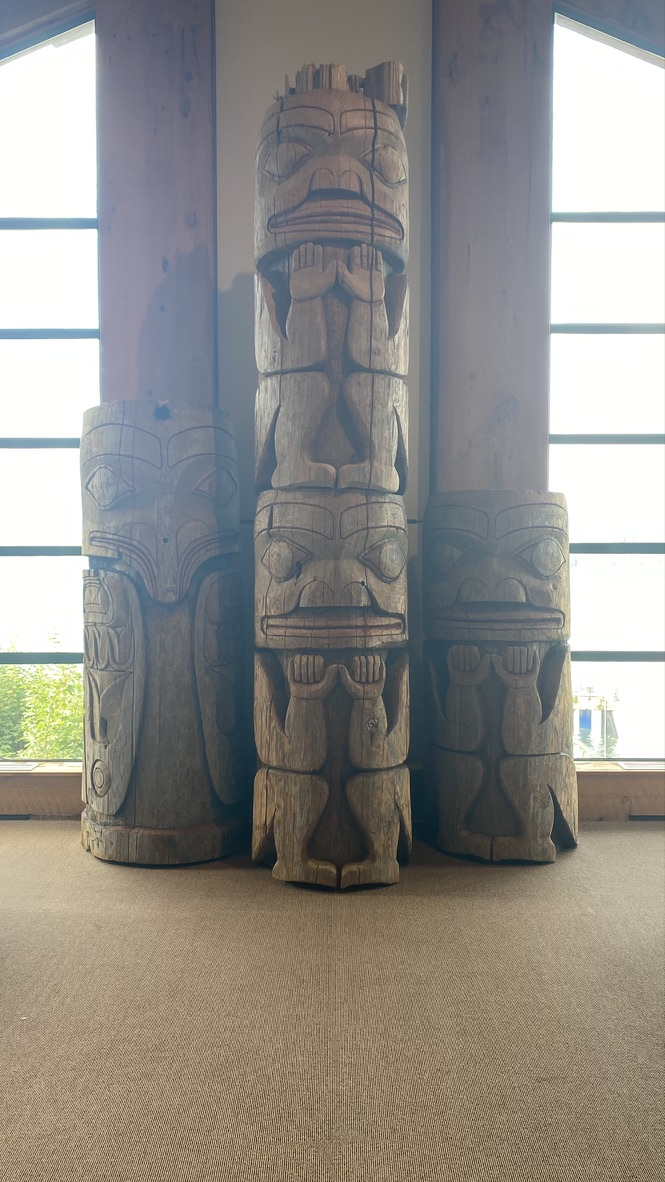
Totem poles

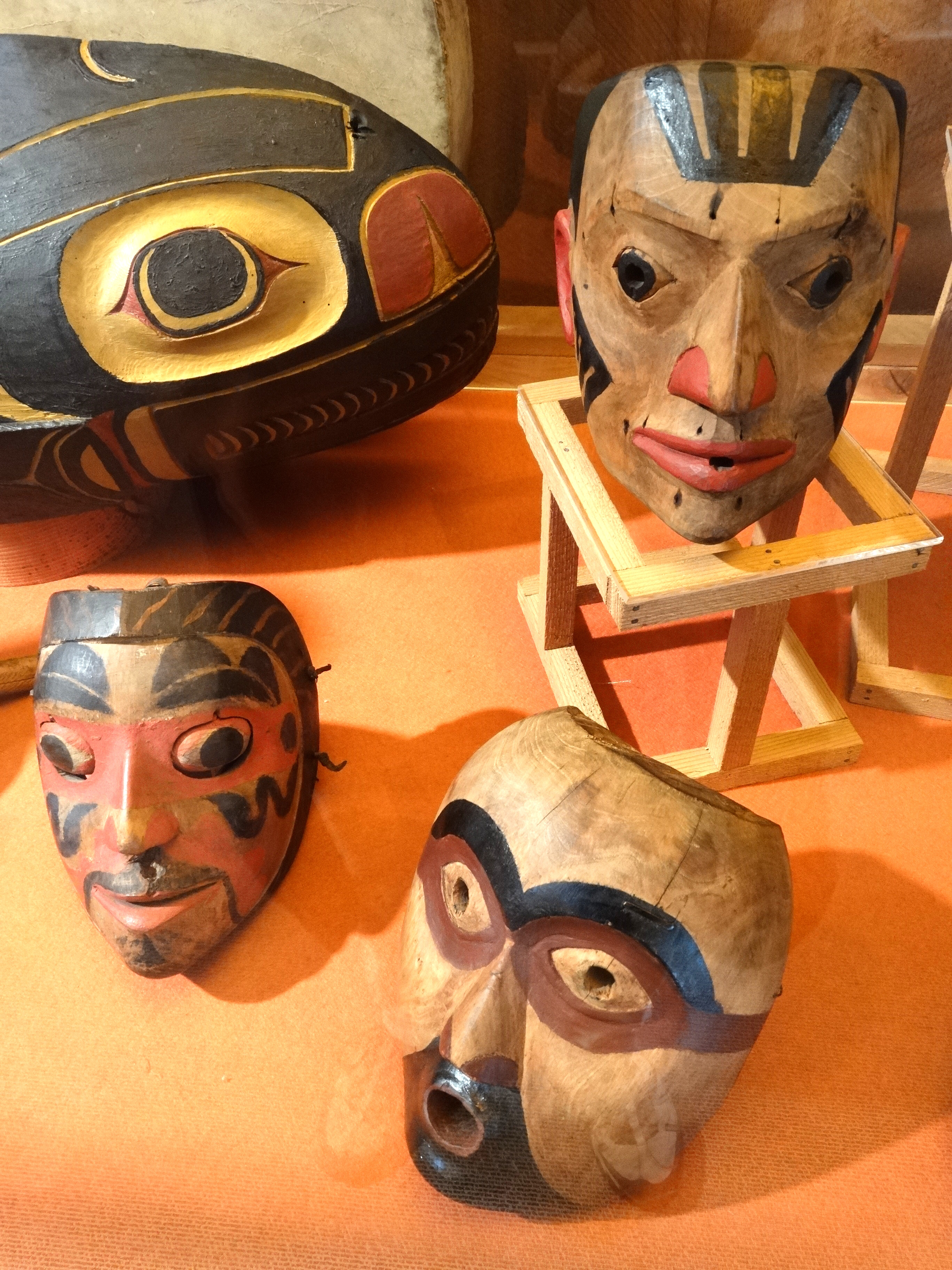
Tsimshian masks

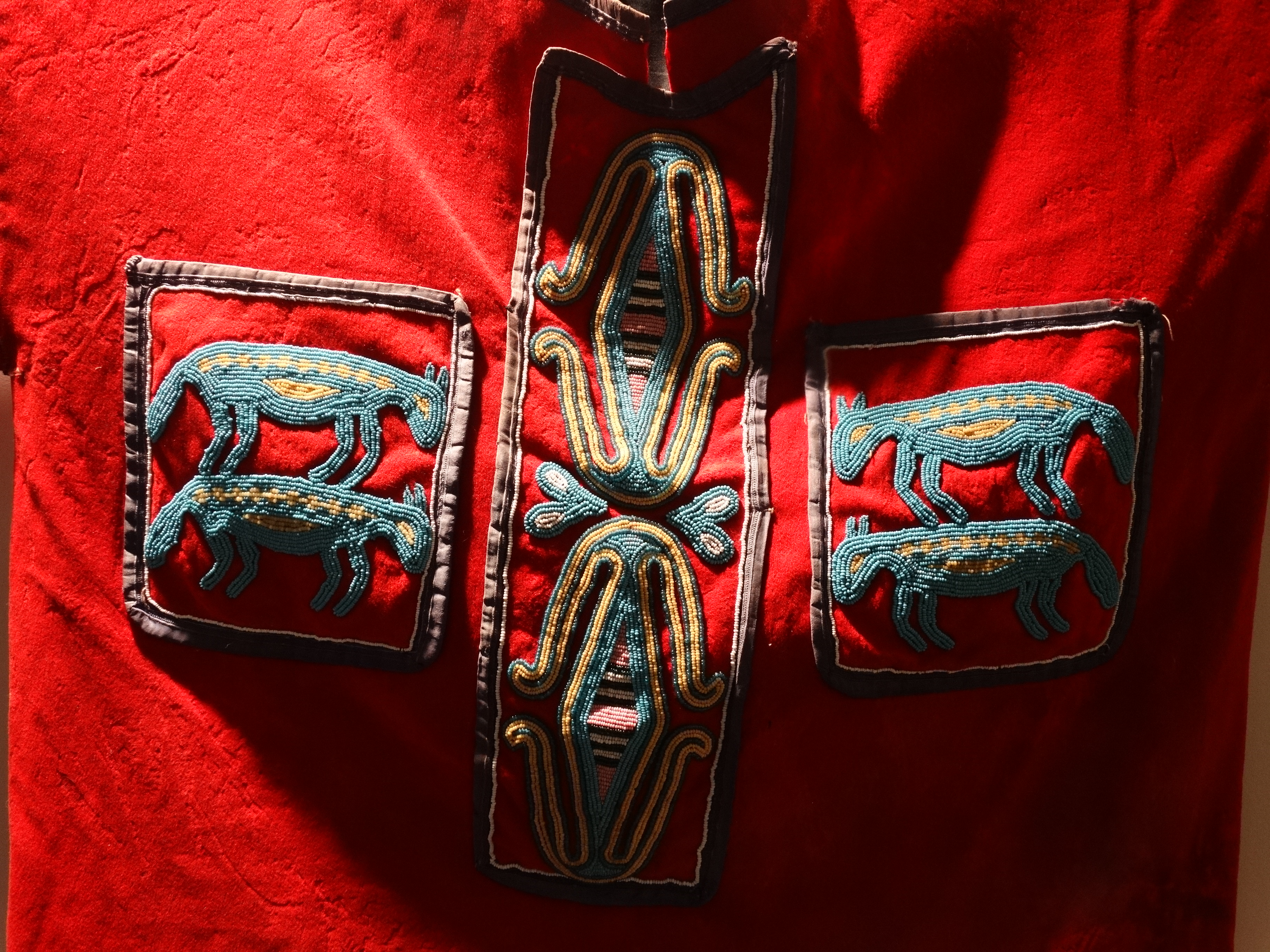
A tunic adorned with beads

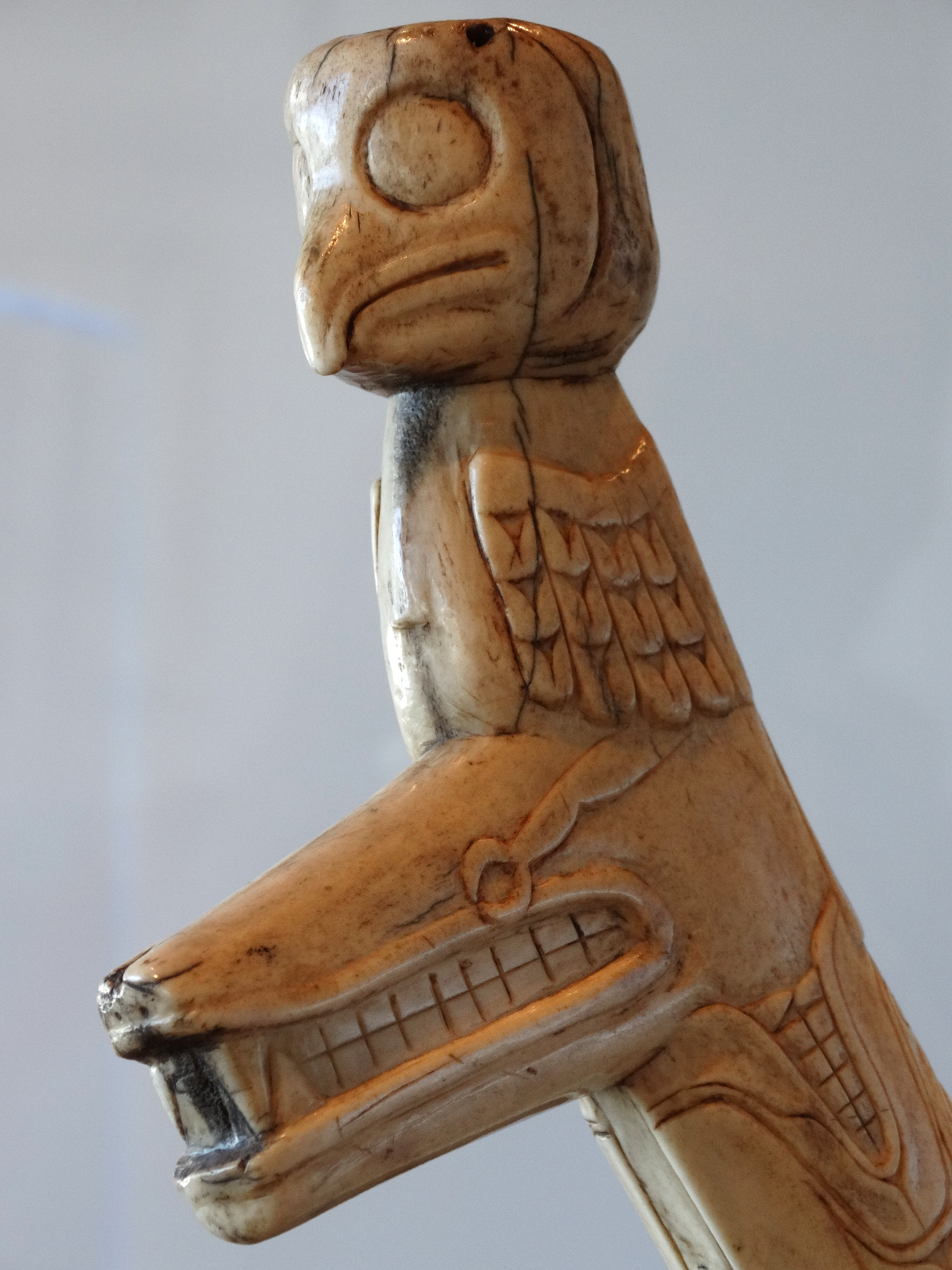
A Haida war club made from an antler

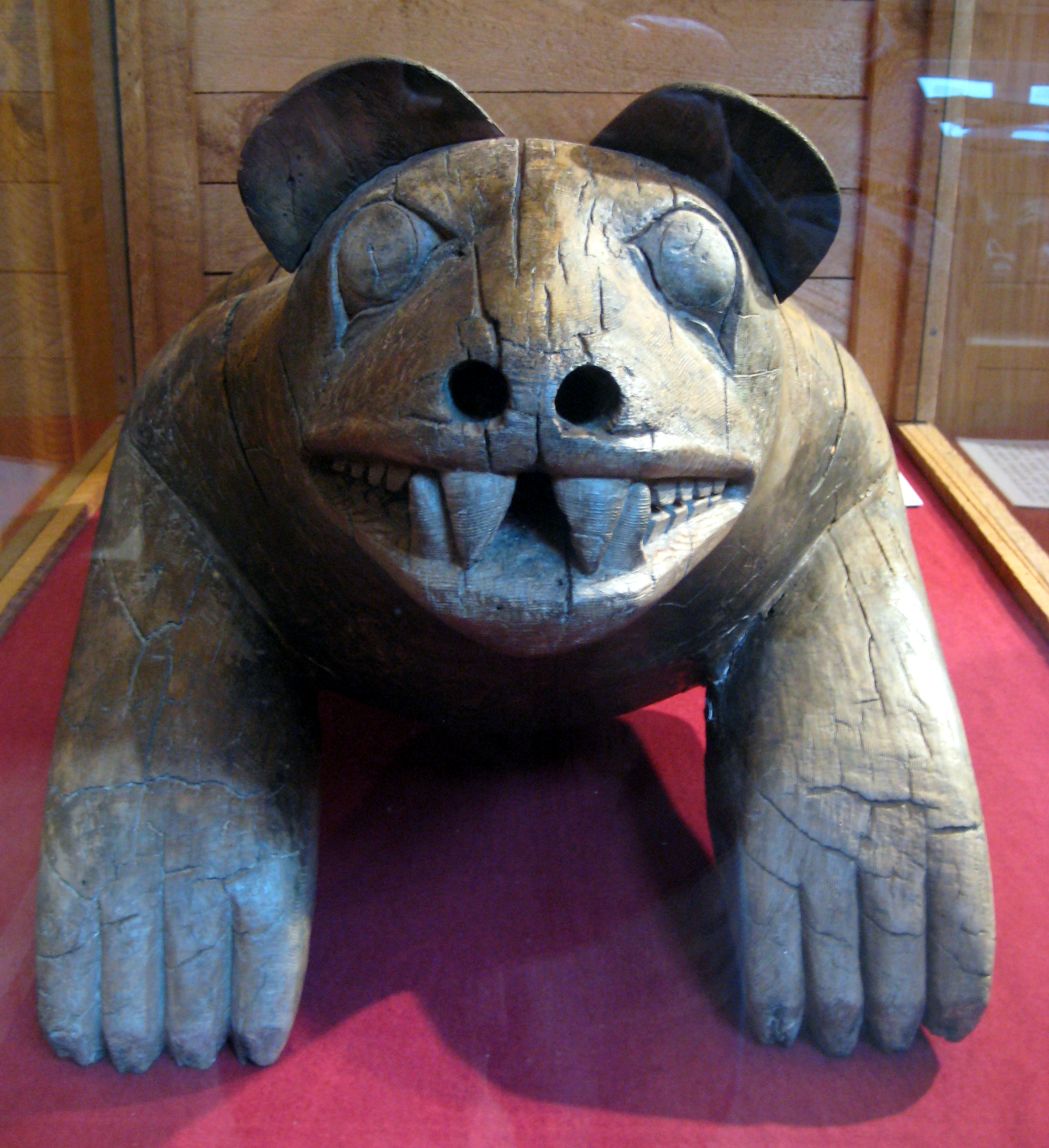
A sculpture
