= Freda Diesing =

Canadian Haida woodcarver and educator

- Born: Marie Alfreda Johnson; 2 June 1925; Prince Rupert, British Columbia, Canada
- Died: 4 December 2002 (aged 77)
- Education: Vancouver School of Art, Gitanmaax School of Northwest Coast Indian Art
- Known for: woodcarver, totem carver
- Movement: Northwest Coast art

Freda Diesing (2 June 1925 – 4 December 2002) was a Haida woman of the Sadsugohilanes Clan, one of very few female carvers of Northwest Coast totem poles and a member of the Council of the Haida Nation of British Columbia, Canada. Her Haida name is Skil Kew Wat, meaning "magical little woman."

== Early life and education ==
She was born Marie Alfreda Johnson in Prince Rupert, British Columbia, on 2 June 1925. She studied painting at the Vancouver School of Art and was one of the first students at the Gitanmaax School of Northwest Coast Indian Art ('Ksan) at Hazelton, British Columbia, in Gitksan territory. There she received instruction from the art historian Bill Holm, and the First Nations artists Tony Hunt (Kwakwaka'wakw) and Robert Davidson (Haida).

== Artwork ==
Diesing began her carving career when she was 42 years old using traditional formline design. She carved portrait masks and bowls as well as totem poles. She designed ceremonial button blankets and carved wall panels for the Prince Rupert General Hospital. She was part of the major revival in Northwest Coast art in the 1960s.

Her poles include two poles raised at the Tsimshian community of Kitsumkalum near Terrace, British Columbia, with the assistance of a Tsimshian team, a 1987 pole for the RCMP station in Terrace, and poles in Prince Rupert.

== Legacy and awards ==
Diesing was a master carver, painter, educator and champion of First Nations art and culture. Her students include acclaimed artists Dempsey Bob, Norman Tait, her nephew Don Yeomans, and many others. She lived in Terrace in her later years, and can be credited with instructing numerous students throughout the Pacific Northwest.

Diesing has received many honors and awards. She was recognized by the National Aboriginal Achievement Foundation, now Indspire, who awarded her the National Aboriginal Achievement Award in Winnipeg in March 2002. She received an honorary doctorate from the University of Northern British Columbia in May 2002. In 2006 the Freda Diesing School of Northwest Coast Art was created in Terrace, British Columbia and named in her honor.

She has served as artist-in-residence in the Dominican Republic and participated in sculpture symposia in Finland.

== Exhibitions ==
1993 Art of the mask: works from the Peacock Collection. Thunder Bay Art Gallery, Thunder Bay

1994 Spirit Faces. Inuit Art Gallery, Vancouver, British Columbia.

1996 Topographies: aspects of recent B.C. art. Vancouver Art Gallery, Vancouver, British Columbia.

1998 Down from the shimmering sky: masks of the Northwest Coast. Vancouver Art Gallery, Vancouver, British Columbia.

2019 Hearts of Our People: Native Women Arts. Minneapolis Institute of Art, Minneapolis, Minnesota.
