= Reconciliation Pole =

Totem pole in Vancouver, British Columbia

Coordinates: 49°15′36″N 123°14′56″W

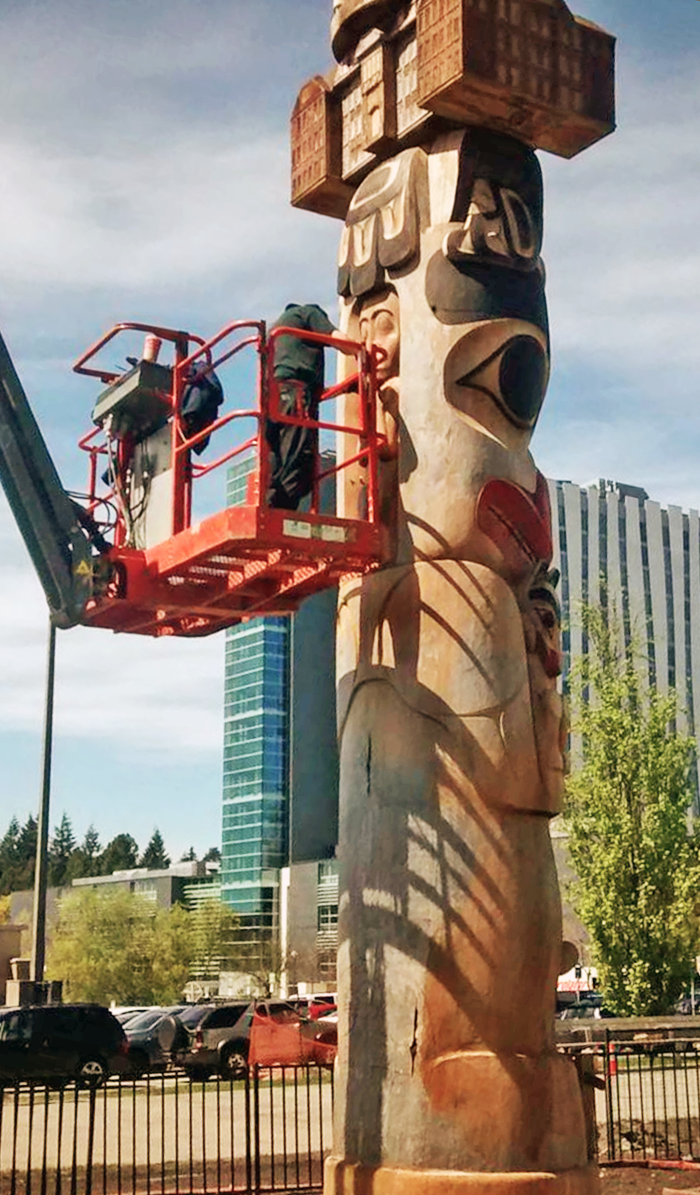
- James Hart carving the Reconciliation Pole
- Artist: James Hart
- Year: 2015-2017
- Dimensions: 1,700 cm (660 in)
- Location: Vancouver, British Columbia

The Reconciliation Pole is a totem pole carved by Haida artist and chief James Hart. The pole is located at the southern end of the University of British Columbia campus in Vancouver. The pole was carved between 2015 and 2017 using yellow and red cedar wood. Commissioned by Michael Audain, the pole was erected on April 1, 2017. The pole recounts the history and impact of the Canadian Indian residential school system on Indigenous peoples in Canada.

== Elements of the Reconciliation Pole ==
The pole is divided into three sections recounting the history of Indigenous peoples before, during, and after residential schools.

=== Before Residential Schools ===
==== θəʔit ====
The base of the Reconciliation Pole is surrounded by a bronze disc titled θəʔit (truth). The disc was designed by Musqueam carver Kayám̓ Richard Campbell Sr. and installed on May 11, 2023. θəʔit depicts four salmon representing different phases of life.

==== Bear Mother and Shaman ====
A shaman is depicted standing between the legs of the Bear Mother and atop the salmon house, conducting a ritual to sustain the salmon, ensuring they return to spawn. The Bear Mother is also featured with her cubs and Raven between her ears.

=== During Residential Schools ===
==== Residential School House ====
A residential school house is depicted, with copper nails embedded into the building. Each of the copper nails represents a child who died in the residential school system. On the underside of the school, the nails form the shapes of two skeletons. The school is based on Coqualeetza Residential School, which was attended by Hart's grandfather.

==== Children ====
Children in school uniforms are depicted above the school. The children's feet are not shown, representing their lack of stability during this time. Various artists from across Canada contributed to the carving and painting of the children including Susan Point, Reg Davidson, Zacharias Kunuk, Phil Gray, and Sven Haakanson. Above the children are a killer whale, bear, eagle, and thunderbird.

=== After Residential Schools ===
==== Family ====
A mother, father, and children are depicted in high-ranking regalia, representing a revitalization of Indigenous cultures.

==== Canoe, Longboat, and Eagle ====
Above the family is a longboat and a canoe travelling side-by-side, representing collaboration and a joint future between Indigenous peoples and the government of Canada. Atop the canoe and Longboat is an eagle, representing strength and leadership.
