= Victoria Wyatt =

American art historian (born 1956)

Victoria Wyatt (born August 3, 1956) is an ethnographer and art historian specializing in Northwest Coast Native American art.

Wyatt was educated at Kenyon College (BA) and Yale University (MA, M.Phil., Ph.D.). She is a professor in the Department of History in Art at University of Victoria, in British Columbia, Canada.

Her books include Shapes of Their Thoughts: Reflections of Culture Contact in Northwest Coast Indian Art, and Images from the Inside Passage: An Alaskan Portrait by Winter and Pond(with Lloyd Winter and Percy Pond). Wyatt taught previously at the University of Washington in Seattle, and served as curator of the Northwest Coast Art collection at the university's Burke Museum of Natural History and Culture.
