= Dempsey Bob =

Canadian woodcarver and sculptor

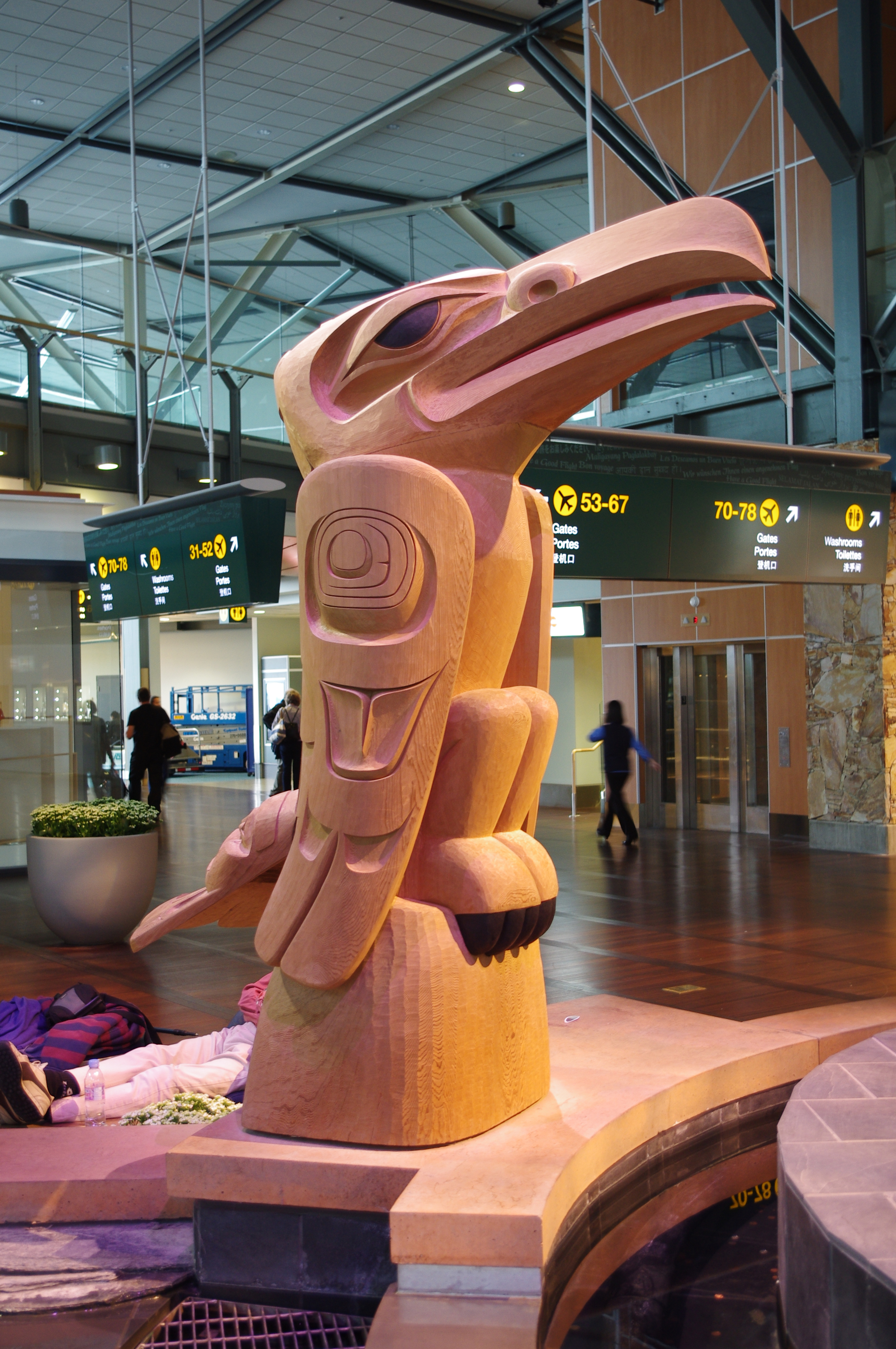
The Story of Fog Woman and Raven in the Vancouver International Airport

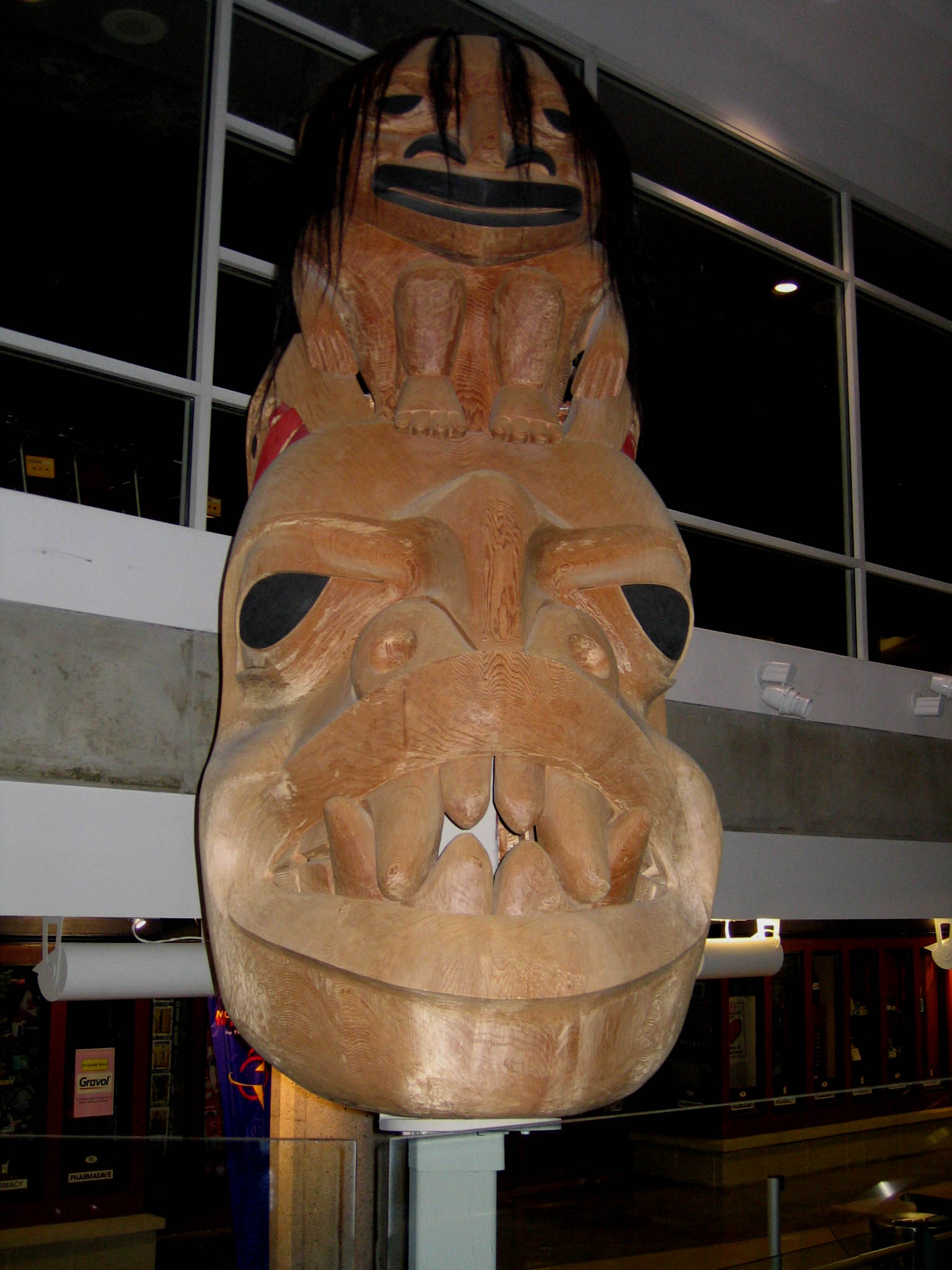
Human/bear mask by Dempsey Bob in the Vancouver International Airport

Dempsey Bob, OC (born 1948) is a Northwest Coast woodcarver and sculptor from British Columbia, Canada, who is of Tahltan and Tlingit First Nations descent. He was born in the Tahltan village of Telegraph Creek on the Stikine River in northwestern B.C., and is of the Wolf clan.

== Career ==
Dempsey began carving in 1969, studying with the Haida carver Freda Diesing in Prince Rupert, B.C. In 1972-1974 he studied at the Gitanmaax School of Northwest Coast Indian Art ('Ksan) at Hazelton, B.C., in Gitksan territory and then taught there for many years. In 2006, he helped found and is a senior advisor of the Freda Diesing School of Northwest Coast Arts in Terrace, B.C., to carry on Diesing's legacy and guide the next generation of First Nation artists. His apprentices have included the Tahltan carver Dale Campbell and Tlingit carver Keith Wolfe Smarch. He was appointed an Officer of the Order of Canada in 2013 for his work as a carver, teaching the next generation of carvers and his dedication to Talhtan-Tlingit cultural preservation. He also received an honorary degree from the University of British Columbia in 2014.

His works are included in many museum and gallery collections such as the Canadian Museum of History; the Royal British Columbia Museum; the University of British Columbia's Museum of Anthropology; the Audain Art Museum; the Columbia Museum of Ethnology; the Aboriginal and Northern Affairs art collection in Ottawa, the Smithsonian Institution; National Museum of Ethnology in Japan; and the Hamburgisches Museum fur Volkerskkunde in Hamburg, Germany. Major commissions include the Vancouver Airport Authority, the Museum of Northern B.C., Prince Rupert; and the Owase Community Cultural Centre, Japan. In 1982, he and nephew Stanley Bevan cared the Raven Stealing the Sun totem pole for Ketchikan, Alaska.

Bob's preferred medium is wood, although he uses many different materials in his work. He carves bowls, masks, totem poles and other works, mostly in the Tlingit style. The first time his work was shown at the National Gallery of Canada was in 1992. He was included in the landmark exhibition Land Spirit Power, the first survey exhibition of First Nations contemporary art to be held at the NGC. Since then he has had many solo and group exhibitions in Canada and around the world, and his works have been widely collected in major public and private collections.

Themes of his artwork include developing ideas from traditional West Coast First Nations stories, with frogs being one of his preferred subjects.

== Exhibitions ==
Dempsey Bob's solo exhibitions include:

- 1989: Tahltan-Tlingit - Carver of the Wolf Clan, The Grace Gallery, Vancouver, BC
- 1993: Myth Maker and Transformer, Vancouver Centennial Museum, Vancouver, BC
- 2014: North, Equinox Gallery, Vancouver, BC
- 2017-2018: New Work, Equinox Gallery, Vancouver, BC
- 2022: Wolves: The Art of Dempsey Bob, Audain Art Museum, Whistler, BC

== Awards and honours ==
- Aboriginal Art Lifetime Achievement Awards, 2007
- Officer of the Order of Canada, 2013
- Hon. Degree from UBC, 2014
- Governor General's Awards in Visual and Media Arts Artistic Achievement Award, 2021

== Bibliography ==
- Jensen, Doreen; Sargent, Polly (1987), Robes of Power: Totem Poles on Cloth, Vancouver, B.C.: University of British Columbia Press.
- Macnair, Peter L.; Hoover, Alan L.; Neary, Kevin (1984), The Legacy: Tradition and Innovation in Northwest Coast Indian Art, Vancouver, B.C.: Douglas & McIntyre.
- Stewart, Hilary (1993), Looking at Totem Poles, Seattle: University of Washington Press, ISBN 0-295-97259-9.
- Thom, Ian M. (2009), "Dempsey Bob", Challenging Traditions: Contemporary First Nations Art of the Northwest Coast, Vancouver, B.C.: Douglas & McIntyre, pp. 16–19.
- Hill, Greg A.(2015), Acquisition Proposal for Dempsey Bob's Eagles North and Wolf Warrior Helmet, accession #46710 and #46711, Curatorial File, National Gallery of Canada
