= Marvin Oliver (artist) =

Quinault and Isleta Pueblo artist, educator

- Born: July 1, 1946; Shelton, Washington, U.S.
- Died: July 17, 2019 (aged 73); Seattle, Washington, U.S.
- Occupations: Artist, professor
- Known for: Sculpture, printmaking

Marvin Oliver (1946–2019) was an Indigenous American artist and professor. He mainly focused on contemporary sculpture and printmaking. Oliver used his Quinault and Isleta-Pueblo heritage as an influence for his art, but he also took inspiration from Coast Salish traditions.

== Biography ==
Salish Clam Basket (2008) by Marvin Oliver at the Renwick Gallery in Washington, D.C., in 2022

Oliver was born in Shelton, Washington in 1946 and his family moved to the San Francisco Bay Area, when he was eight years old. He later attended the University of Washington, graduating in 1973. He studied art history and art under Bill Holm and Jacob Lawrence. He became a professor at the University of Washington the next year in 1974. One of this students was Jewell James.

In 1975, Oliver offered the Seattle Seahawks a redesign of their logo, to bring its look close to that of local formline art styles.

Oliver created many pieces from glass such as "Northwest Coast-style baskets and spirit boards, kachinas and fins, faces and disks. He carved and painted wood totem poles, cylinders, and door panels. He cast towering bronze fins. His serigraphs of whales and birds were bright and joyful". Oliver gifted his artwork to the University of Washington graduates celebrating Raven's Feast community dinner. He also created an honor group for students at San Francisco State University who occupied Alcatraz from 1969 to 1970.

A few of Marvin Oliver's works can be seen in Perugia, Italy. His piece "The Orca" is located in Sisters Orca Park. Also, "Soul Catcher" and "Raven's Journey" are both located on the University of Washington campus. The work "Mystical Journey", weighing 12,000 pounds is in the Seattle Children's Hospital. Oliver also had a studio in Seattle and a gallery in Ketchikan, Alaska.

Oliver received the Odegaard Award in May 2019, which is given to individuals "whose leadership in the community exemplifies the former UW president's work on behalf of diversity."

Oliver died from pancreatic cancer on July 17, 2019, in Seattle, Washington.

== Collections ==
Oliver's art is held in the permanent collections of the following institutions:

- Museum of International Folk Art
- Portland Museum of Art
- Seattle Art Museum
- National Museum of the American Indian

== See also ==
- List of Native American artists
