= Katlian =

19th century Alaska native leader

- K’alyáan
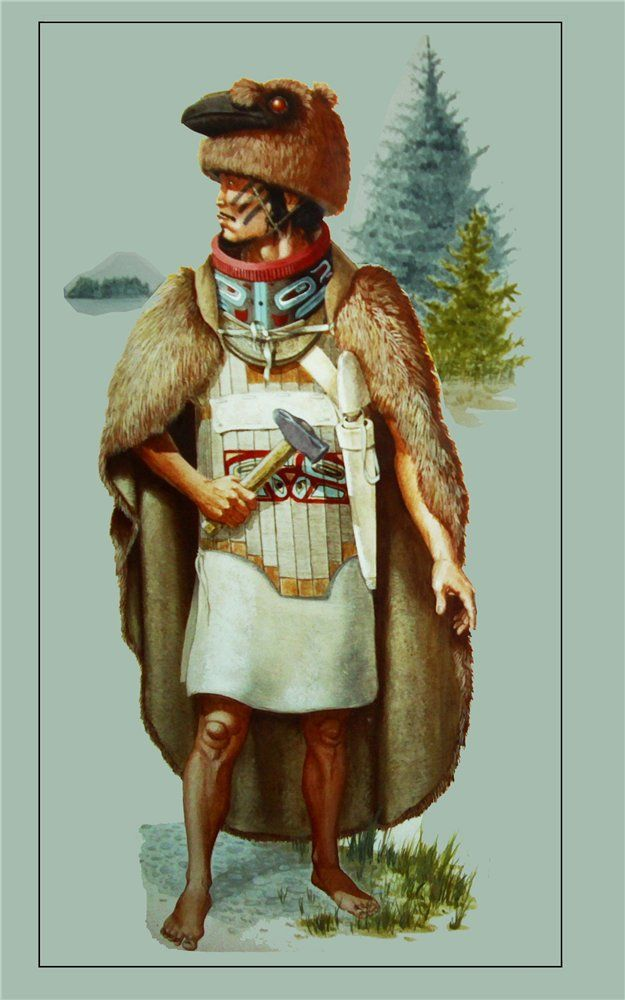
- A modern reconstruction of Katlian in war armor, with his distinctive ‘raven helmet’ and blacksmith hammer

Chief of the Tlingit Kiks.ádi clan

Personal details
- Born: c. 1770s Sitka (Modern-day Alaska)
- Spouse: Wife (name unknown)
- Relations: Yon Te Ske (granddaughter)

Military service
- Years of service: c. 1802–1820s
- Rank: War chief
- Battles/wars: Battle of Sitka

Katlian (Tlingit: K’alyáan) (c. 1770s – unknown) was a Tlingit chief of the Kiks.ádi clan who led a rebellion against the Russian Empire in Alaska, culminating in the Battle of Sitka in 1804. There he and several hundred Tlingit warriors defended a wooden fort against the Russian-American Company and Aleut allies under Alexander Baranov. In the present day, he is seen as a figure of resistance and pride in Tlingit culture.

== Early life ==
Since he was documented as being about forty-five in 1818, Katlian’s birth year can be estimated to be around 1773. He was born a tribal aristocrat in Sitka, Alaska, to the Kiks.ádi (frog) clan of the Tlingit nation. He had at least one brother, who would end up being a Russian prisoner by 1818, and one uncle, who would serve as an advisor on warfare to Katlian during his reign.

== Chief of the Kiks.ádi ==
=== The Battles of Sitka ===
By June of 1802 the young Katlian had become a war chief, and was to lead a raid on the first Russian fort at Sitka. The ensuing battle was a success for the Tlingit, who inflicted heavy casualties, destroyed key buildings, and secured the location for themselves. It was here that Katlian obtained a Russian-made blacksmith hammer, his future weapon of choice. After the victory, an assembly of clan leaders convened to decide whether or not to pursue diplomacy or further conflict. At the urging of a well-respected shaman, the clan leaders selected Katlian to be the singular war chief. With this new authority he was responsible for the construction of a new fort, and subsequent defense from future incursions.

The sapling fort, as it was called, would come under siege in the infamous Battle of Sitka in 1804. The battle occurred on 1 October 1804, and began with the Aleuts assaulting the log palisades. Katlian ordered his forces, as part of a surprise attack, to hold fire patiently until Russian personnel approached. When they saw the Russians to be in range the defenders immediately opened with musket fire, which caused the exposed Aleut skirmishers to panic and withdraw. Subsequently charging out of the front gates, Katlian and his most elite warriors swiftly met the Russian right flank, crumbling the initiative of the offense and triggering a full-scale retreat.

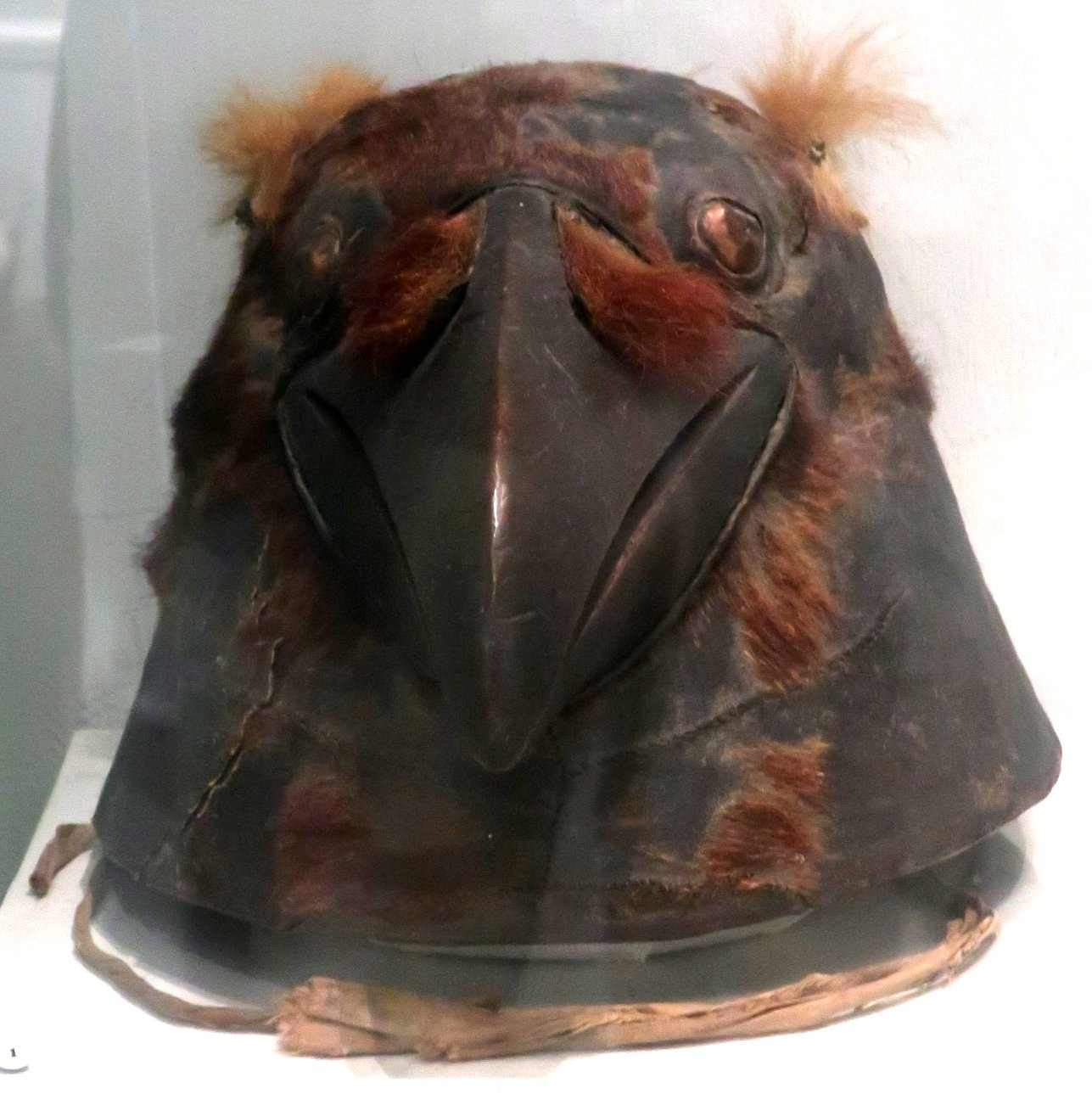
The signature raven helmet worn by Katlian during the second Battle of Sitka (1804).

The victory was short-lived; after a few days of dwindling gunpowder supply and stagnant negotiations, Katlian and his followers escaped into the surrounding wilderness, leaving behind their possessions in an effort now known as the survival march. The empty fort was then captured and renamed Novoarkhangel’sk (New Arkhangelsk), and was to be the new capital of Russian America.

=== Post-conflict ===
After the defeat at Sitka, Katlian’s group established a new base, strategically placed at a neck to intercept any incoming ships or canoes. For the next few years, the Kiks.ádi ran a blockade; any time a trading vessel approached Novoarchangel’sk they would row out in canoes and inform them to stay away, because “Sheet’ka [Sitka] still belongs to the Kiks.ádi.”

American merchants took advantage of the blockade by replacing the Russians in local trade, establishing their own port known as Trader’s Bay, and selling firearms to Katlian’s forces. In 1807 Governor Baranov repeatedly sent envoys to Katlian in hopes of the Kiks.ádi lifting the blockade and returning to Sitka, although after consulting with his council, Katlian decided to keep the clan in their current fortified location.

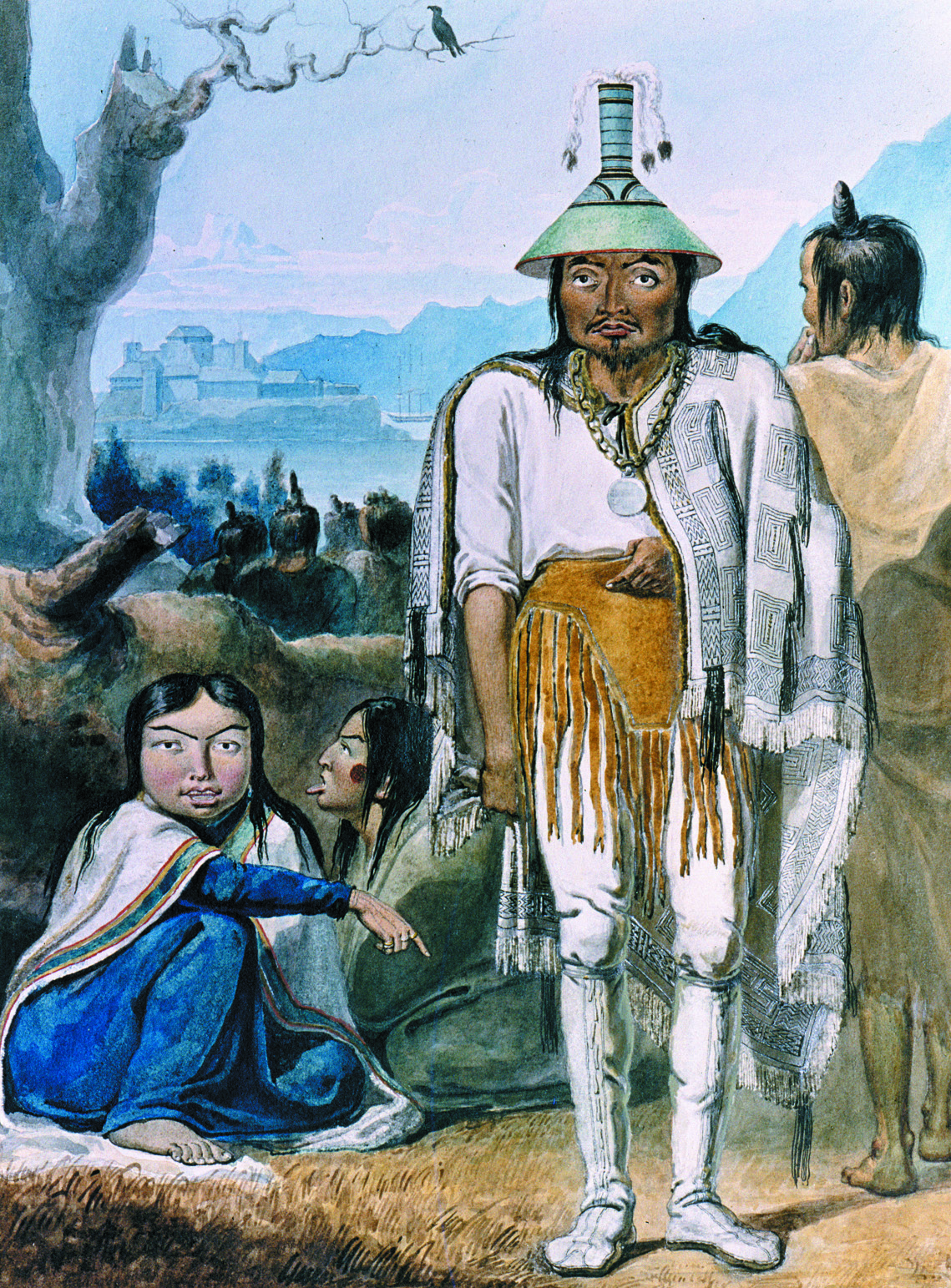
Painting of Chief Katlian and his Wife, done by Tikhanov

Katlian’s conduct in his later years was recorded in 1818 by then-Captain Vasily Golovnin in his publication Around the World on the Kamchatka. Katlian reportedly spent hours sharing biscuits and vodka with the exploring sailors, and acknowledged his past in ‘exterminating’ the Russians. At the time, he had been given a silver neck medal by a colonial administrator – apparently his former enemy, Baranov, – and was wearing it. Despite the apparent ceased hostilities, Golovnin was still cautious of Katlian’s people, describing them as “very dangerous neighbors,” who possessed “barbarian malice,”. Golovnin wrote that the Kiks.ádi killed Russian expeditionaries and hunters for the sake of plunder, and that they wore a mixture of European and native garments. During that same expedition Katlian and his wife sat for a portrait done by the artist Mikhail Tikhanov.

In 1822 the Kiks.ádi returned to Sitka and reconstructed their homes. In his last recorded act of diplomacy, Katlian wrote to the Russians:

The mountains around Sitka belong to the Sheet'ká Kiks.ádi. No Russians will be allowed to hunt for deer or bear on those mountains while the Sheet'ká Kiks.ádi are here. Should any Russian or Aleut attempt to hunt on those hills they will do so at their own peril.

== Legacy ==
In 1809, Captain U.F. Lisianski of the Russian Navy designated a bay north of modern-day Sitka as Katlian Bay. Also present in and around the modern city of Sitka are the eponymous Katlian Street, Katlian Avenue, Katlian Mountain and Katlian River.

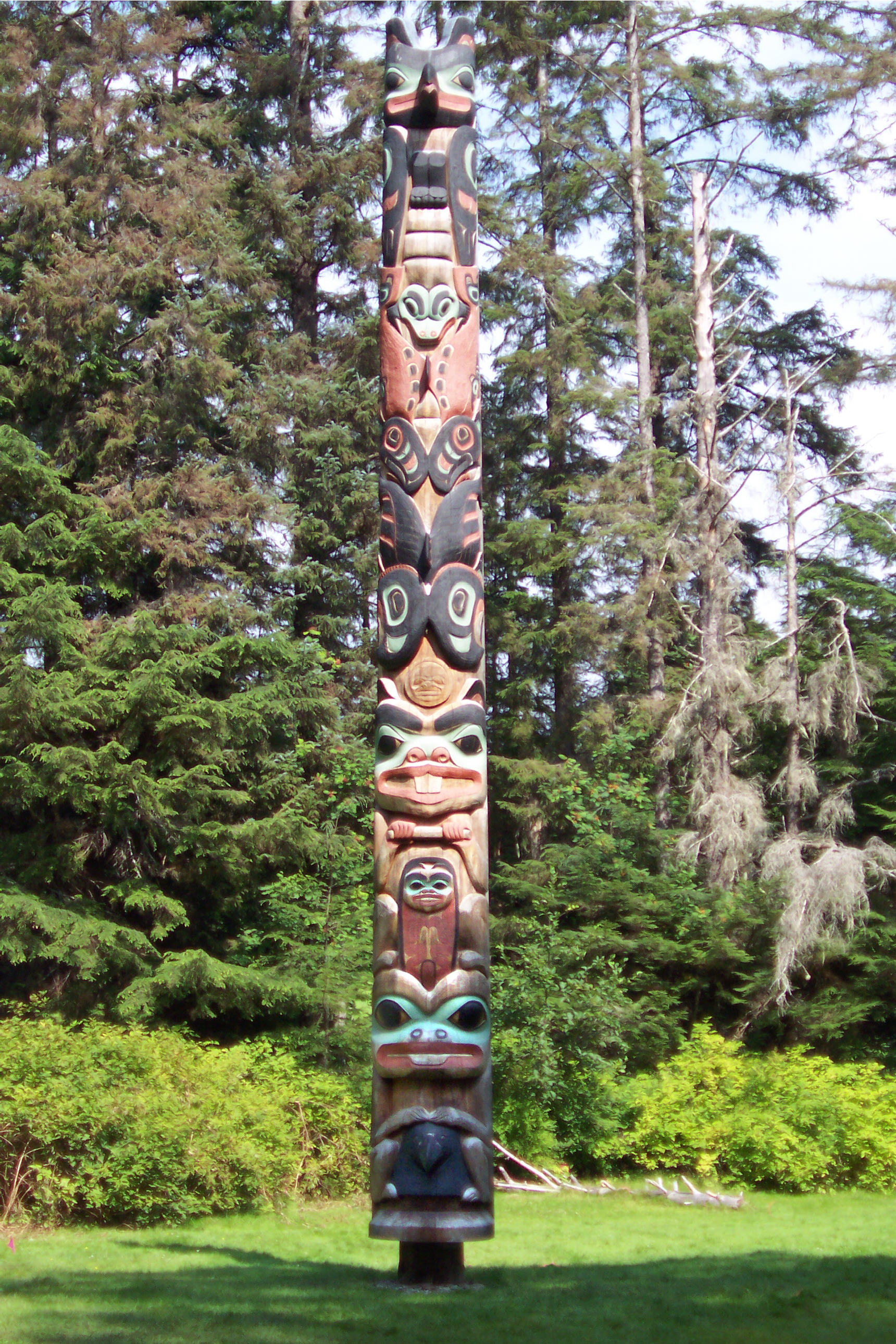
The K'alyaan totem pole

In 1888 U.S. Navy Lieutenant George T. Emmons, while on a trip to “Katliansky”, wrote of a petroglyph detailing an abandoned summer fishing village, which was called ‘Kla-yark, Klayask or Katleansky Village’. According to Emmons, the village was the personal possession of Katlian; located near a stream, it contained around fifteen houses, open grass space, and a potato garden. Historian Robert DeArmond estimated that the settlement was abandoned around the year 1800.

Katlian had a granddaughter, Yon Te Ske, who went by the anglicized name Anna. In 1866 Anna married James Hollywood, and in the early 1870s they moved to Katlian Bay. There they built two houses and maintained a 200-acre hay ranch with dairy cattle.

USS Katlian (YN-48), named in his honor, was a net-tender in service with the U.S. Navy from 19 December 1940 until 30 January 1946.

He is the namesake of the K’alyáan Pole in the Sitka National Historical Park, which was carved in 1999 and raised at the historic battle site. The totem commemorates the Kiks.ádi clan as well as the entire raven moiety. He is also featured on the Baranof totem pole in Sitka, holding his blacksmith hammer.
