= Baranof totem pole =

Totem pole in Sitka, Alaska

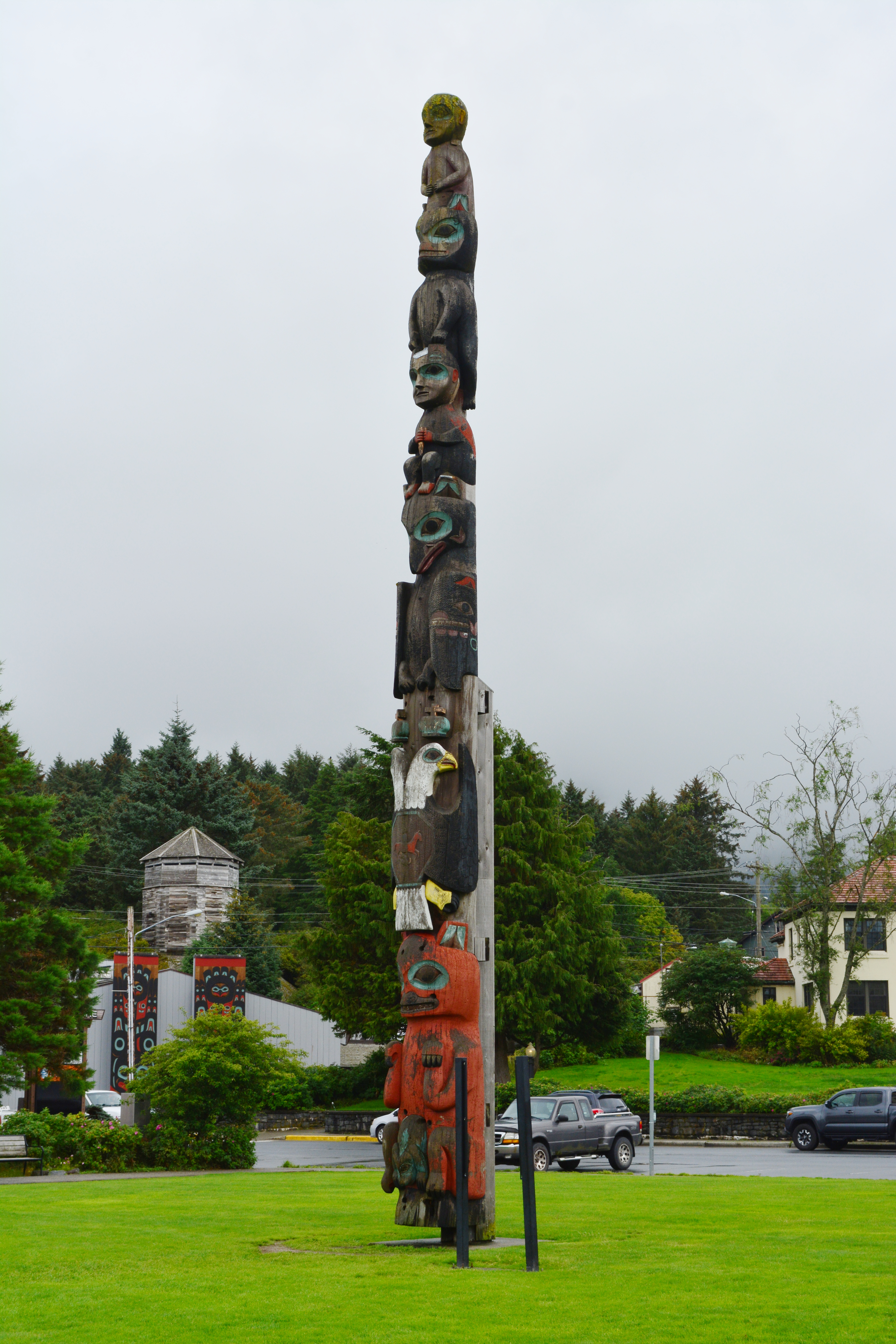
- The Baranof pole in 2023 with the Sitka Blockhouse in the background
- Artist: George Benson
- Year: 1942
- Location: Sitka, Alaska; 57°02′58″N 135°20′21″W

The Baranof totem pole is a totem pole in Sitka, Alaska, United States. Located in the city's Totem Square, the Tlingit totem pole was commissioned in the 1940s by the United States Forest Service and carved as part of a Civilian Conservation Corps project.

Designed by George Benson, the pole references an early 1800s battle and subsequent peace treaty between the Kiks.ádi Tlingit clan and Alexander Baranov, the first governor of Russian Alaska. It depicts some Russian figures, including a Russian bear and a double-headed eagle, and some Alaska Native ones, including a Tlingit brown bear, a frog, and Tlingit warrior Kʼalyaan. At the top of the pole is a representation of Baranov. In Benson's design the figure of Baranov was clothed, but CCC carvers depicted him nude. The nude image, combined with the origin of the carvers — the Forest Service had hired them from the Kiks.ádi Tlingit's historical enemies, the Wrangell Tlingits — made the totem immediately controversial. Sitka locals, perceiving it as a shame pole, threatened to remove it; Benson also disavowed it.

The totem pole was taken down in 2010 and restored the following year, with Baranov clothed.

== Description and location ==
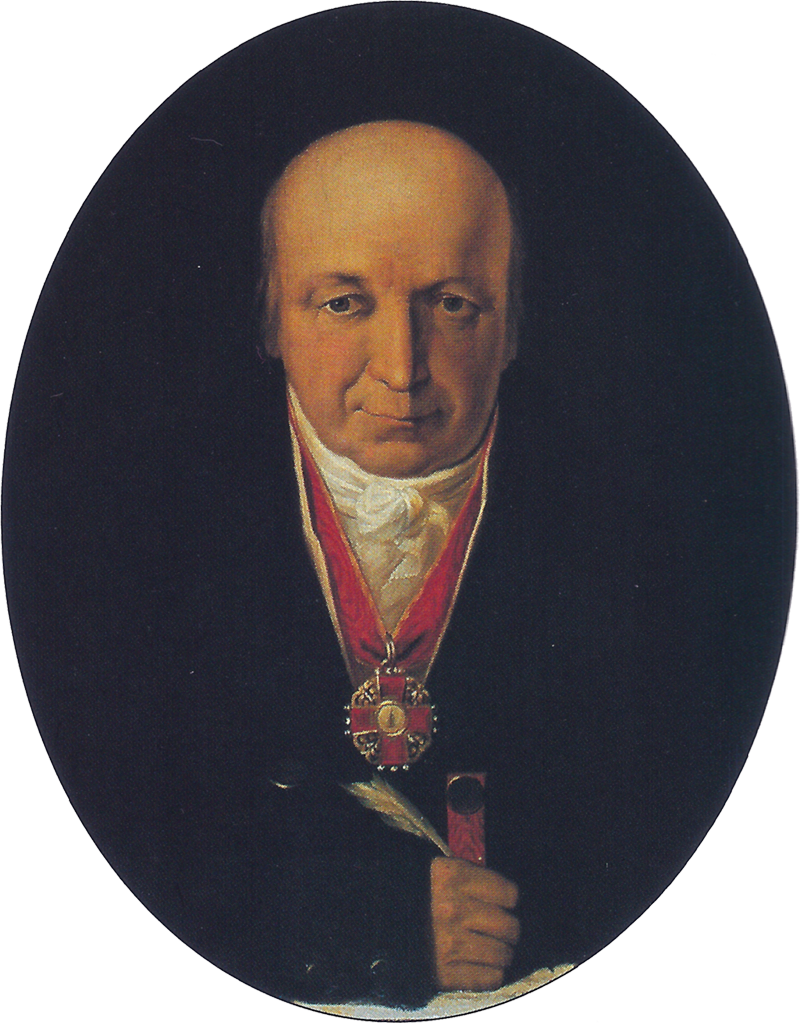
Alexander Andreyevich Baranov, who is shown on the top of the pole.

The Baranof totem pole is located in Totem Square, in Sitka, Alaska. Near the Sitka Pioneer Home, which is listed jointly with the Square on the National Register of Historic Places, the totem pole overlooks a nearby seawall. It is 40 feet tall.

The totem pole commemorates and references the 1804 Battle of Sitka and subsequent 1805 peace treaty between Alexander Andreyevich Baranov, the first governor of Russian Alaska, and the Kiks.ádi Tlingit clan in Sitka, Alaska. The pole incorporates both Russian and Tlingit elements and references Castle Hill in Sitka, given to the Russians by the Tlingits in the peace treaty and, in the words of Tlingit elder Mark Jacobs, was "the only piece of real estate ever given to the Russians".

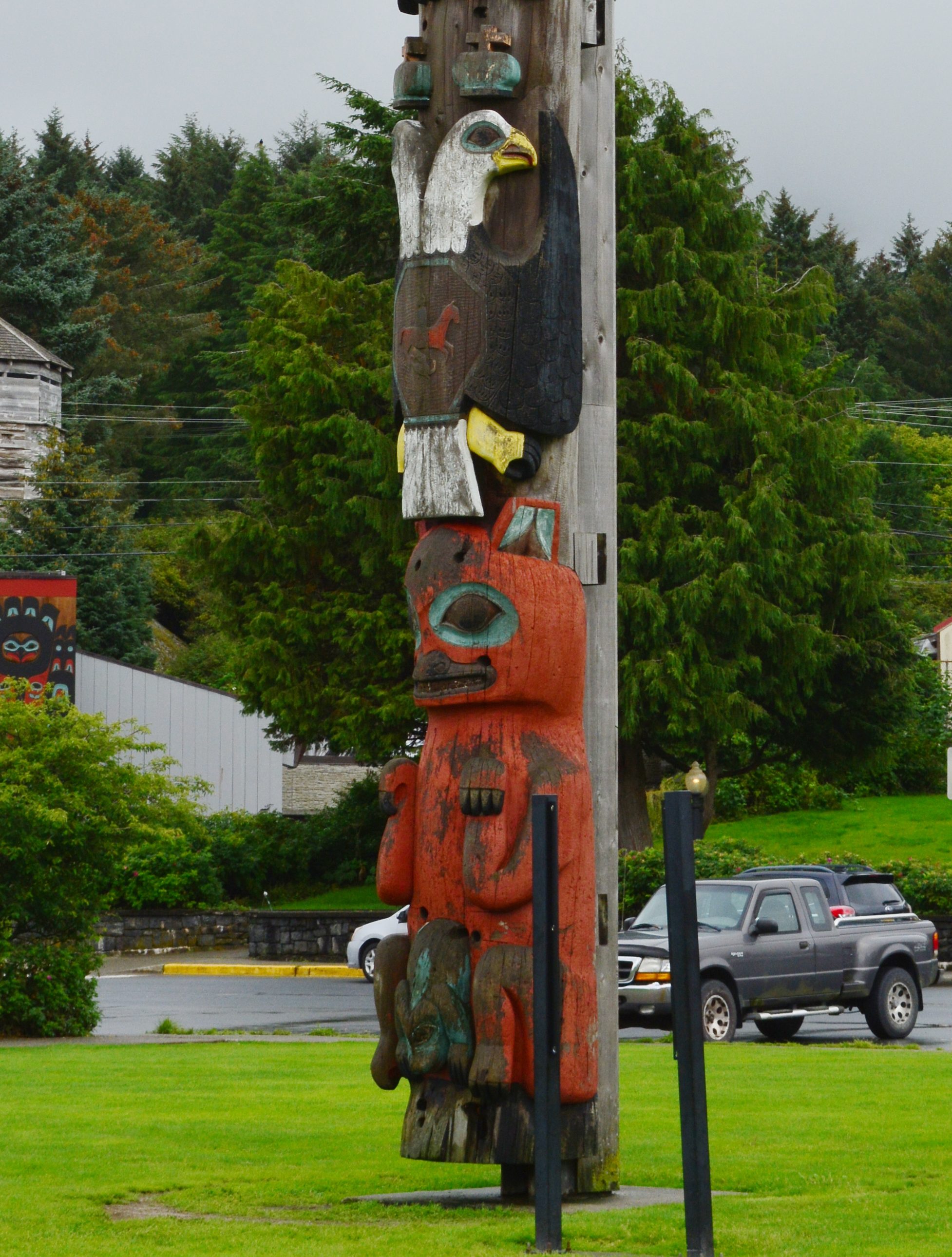
The double headed eagle (representing Russia) and the brown bear holding a frog (representing two Tlingit crests) at the base of the pole

On the top of the pole is Baranov, balding and leaning forward. Below him is a black bear, representing Russia, then the Tlingit warrior Kʼalyaan, holding a blacksmith hammer he'd taken from the Russians. Next is a Raven, in reference to the Kiks.ádi's Raven moiety. Below the Raven is a double-headed eagle, who was also depicted on a peace medal Baranov gave to the Kiks.ádi Tlingit. At the very base of the pole is a brown bear holding a frog; the brown bear and the frog are Tlingit and Kiks.ádi Tlingit crests, respectively.

Until 2011, the figure of Baranov on top of the pole was nude; this was rectified in a 2011 restoration. A brass plaque near the base of the pole reads "Designed by George Benson, Sitka Alaska 1940".

== History ==
=== Design and carving ===
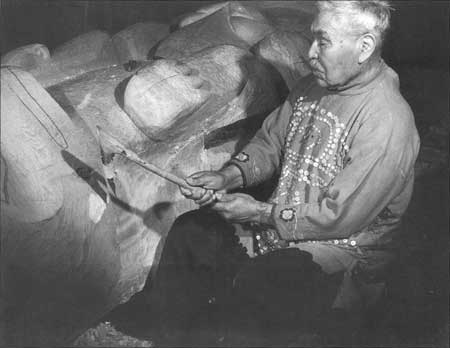
Carver Joe Thomas working on the totem pole in 1941

During the 1930s and 1940s, with the aim of reducing unemployment and preserving Alaska Native arts, the Civilian Conservation Corps (CCC) led a totem pole restoration program in Southeast Alaska. Men from the program were active in Sitka, restoring older poles for display in the Sitka National Historic Park. These poles were mostly of Haida origins; the Kiks.ádi Tlingit clan in Sitka responded by campaigning for the CCC to create a pole depicting Tlingit history. Local Tlingit leader George Tlingit was particularly involved in this campaign; he and other Tlingit people asked architect Linn A. Forrest, overseer of the CCC's totem pole restoration program, for $1,500 to have a totem pole carved. He refused their request. However, he then went on to say that "if they [the Kiks.ádi clan] cared to present a drawing we [the CCC] would attempt to have the totem carved".

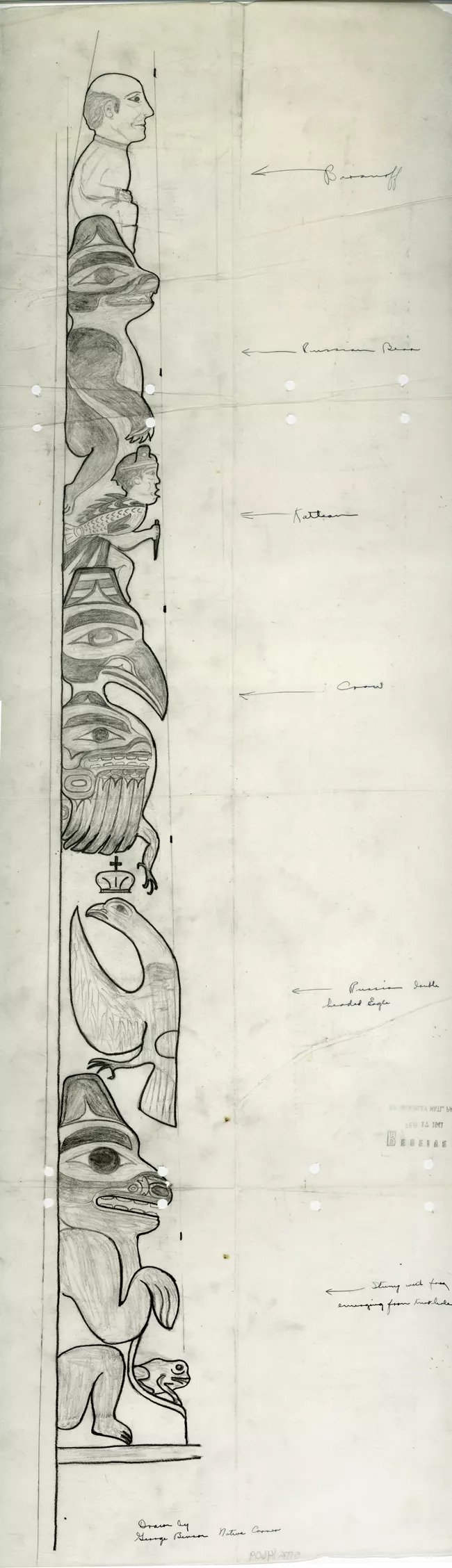
George Benson's original sketch for the totem pole

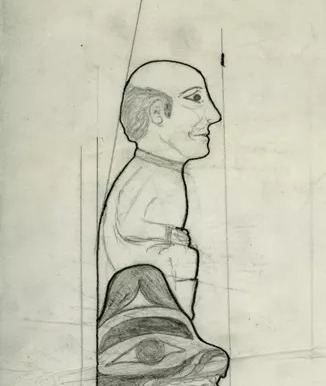
Detail of Benson's sketch; Baranov's clothes are clearly visible

In response, Tlingit man and CCC enrollee George Benson created and submitted to the Sitka National Historical Park custodian a sketch for a pole showing Tlingit history, on top of which sat the Russian governor Baranov. Art historian Emily Moore, in Proud Raven, Panting Wolf, described the sketches formlines as "elegant", saying that the incorporation of Tlingit and Russian elements was "masterful". The Sitka National Historical Park gave the sketch to the Forest Service and Linn A. Forrest. Forrest and the Park Service approved the plans, deciding that this new pole, as a modern creation, would "conflict" with the recreations of older poles in the Sitka National Historic Park, earmarked the pole for installation in a field in downtown Sitka. The Forest Service commissioned the pole and carving was started near the end of the CCC program.

However, in what would prove to be a social faux pas, the Forest Service had not consulted the Sitka Tlingit on matters of carving or follow the Kiks.ádi's wishes that the totem pole be carved in Sitka. Upon discovering that Benson would be working on a sea wall, Linn Forrest realized that carvers at a CCC camp in Wrangel could begin work sooner and sent a copy of the sketch to them. The Wrangel Sitka were from a different clan; therefore, under Tlingit custom, carving the Kiks.ádi at.óow without permission was viewed as offensive theft. In addition, the Wrangell and Sitka Tlingit were historical enemies. They had been fighting since the early 1800s and events such as an 1852 massacre of Wrangell Tlingits were still on people's minds. Linn Forrest was warned by an employee that the totem pole would not be well received, and the Sitka people should be given leave to carve their own version, Forrest responded by saying "the totem is well carved, follows Mr. Benson’s drawing in detail and will be a credit to both the authors of the story and the carvers" and maintained that the under construction Wrangel pole would be installed in Sitka; from the perspective of the Forest Service, as long as the totem pole was an exact reproduction of Benson's sketch, no offense would be taken.

Complicating matters further, the Wrangel carvers deviated from Benson's original designs. Lead carver, Thomas Ukas, later said he believed the pole was carved too quickly and the design had been transferred improperly; carving was eventually taken over by Joe Thomas. Further, while Benson's original sketch depicted Baranov wearing clothes, the carvers at Wrangel did not incorporate these lines into the final drawing; it was rumored that they even carved his genitals.

=== Reception in Sitka ===
The pole was immediately controversial due to the people who carved it and the fact that Baranov had been sculpted in such a fashion; the Kiks.ádi Tlingit said they would “deface, chop and burn up the pole” if it were to be placed in Sitka and people in Sitka threatened to remove it. Just before the pole was installed, Kiks.ádi leader Andrew P. Hope wrote a letter to the Office of Indian Affairs commissioner in March, 1942, decrying how Baranov was depicted "naket, dishonoring the great man who was in charge at the time of war and pease [sic]" and describing the offense that had been caused when people learned the pole was made by Wrangell carvers. He concluded his letter by saying:

Therefore the Keeks-sady clan deems it best that the totem pole made in Wrangell which is being now erected in Sitka, be moved away from Sitka and another one be made here by the Keeks-sady clan who know the story and from the plans they have, to be erected in Sitka.

Nevertheless, the pole was installed in downtown Sitka. The field where it was installed became known as Totem Square.

Benson was known to be embarrassed by the way his design was realized and did not wish to be associated with it; he took to carrying around a sketch of his original design as evidence that he had not drawn the Russian governor nude. At some point after the pole's initial carving, a wooden board was inserted to cover Baranov's genital region. The pole became known as a ridicule or shame pole, meant to humiliate Baranov rather than honor him.

The totem pole was repainted by the Forest Service in 1953 and then taken down in the 1970s for repairs. The techniques used in the 70s were damaging to the Baranof pole; they included attaching the pole to an I-beam, holding it together with metal nails, and using epoxy and wooden shims to fix cracks.

=== Twenty-first century assessment and restorations ===
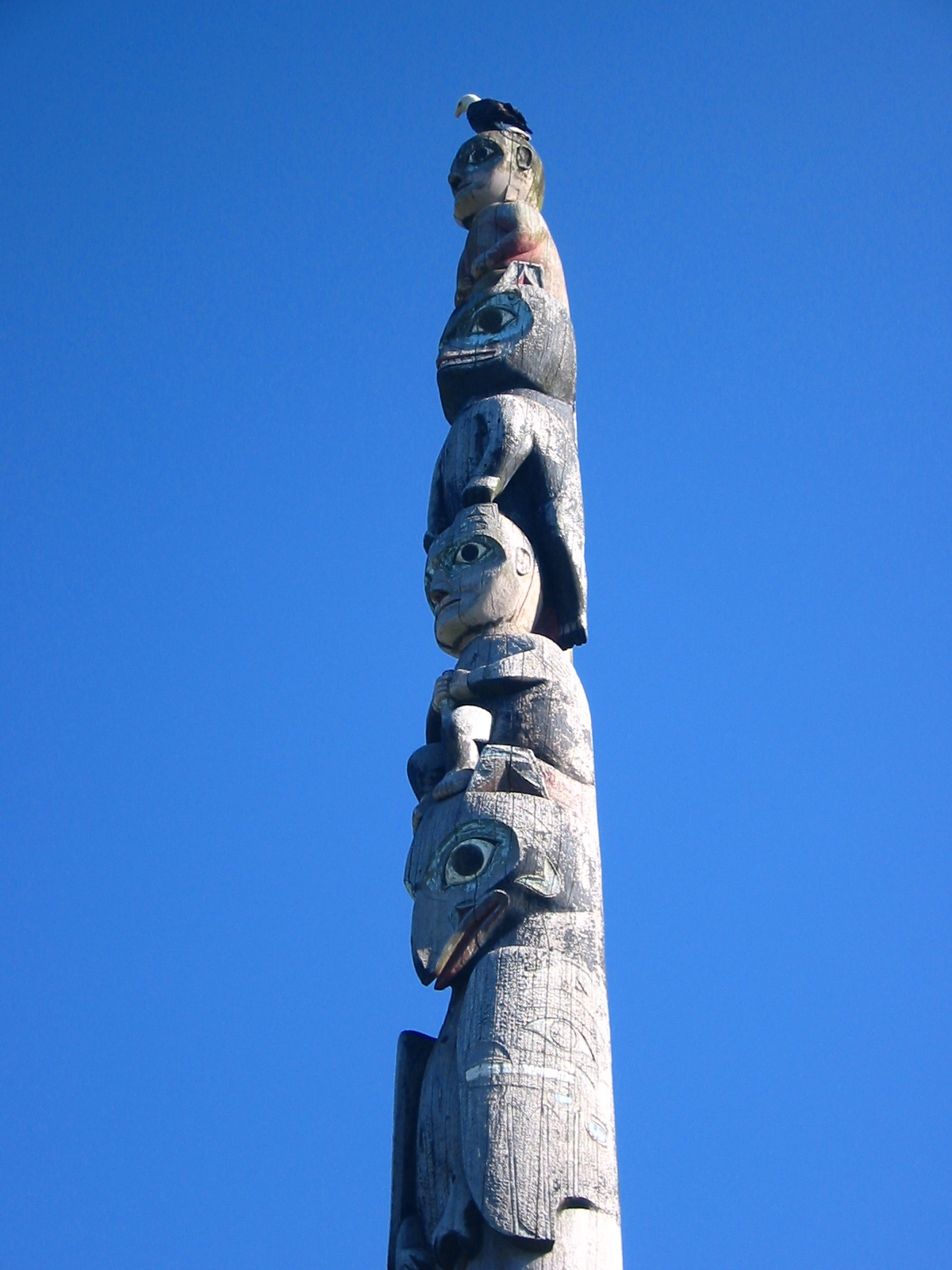
The pole in 2005

In 2004, National Park Service wood conservator Bob Sheetz and Tlingit carver Tommy Joseph assessed the pole, discovering that it had been severely damaged by its time outdoors. Sheetz said that it was possible the pole would need to be replaced, but a full assessment was still needed. By 2008, Sitka Tribe member and storyteller Bob Sam had begun advocating for a new pole to be made, one more true to Benson's designs and in 2010, the Alaska Association for Historic Preservation said the totem pole was one of their most endangered historic sites.

In 2010, the Department of Health and Social Services in Sitka, which was responsible for the upkeep of Totem Square, announced they were going to fund landscaping, accessibility improvements, the restoration of the seawall, improvements to the lighting and fences in the park, as well as the removal and assessment of the totem pole. The totem pole was taken down in October of that year and re-installed in November 2011. The restorations were done by Tommy Joseph. Joseph fixed damage caused by previous restorations, and also gave clothes to Baranov.

== See also ==
- List of totem poles
- Statue of Alexander Andreyevich Baranov

== Sources ==
=== Bibliography ===
Moore, Emily L. (2018). Proud raven, panting wolf: carving Alaska's New Deal totem parks. Seattle: University of Washington Press. ISBN 978-0-295-74393-6. Full access available to users of The Wikipedia Library.
