= Indian River (Alaska) =

Stream on Baranof Island

Indian River - Kaasdahéen
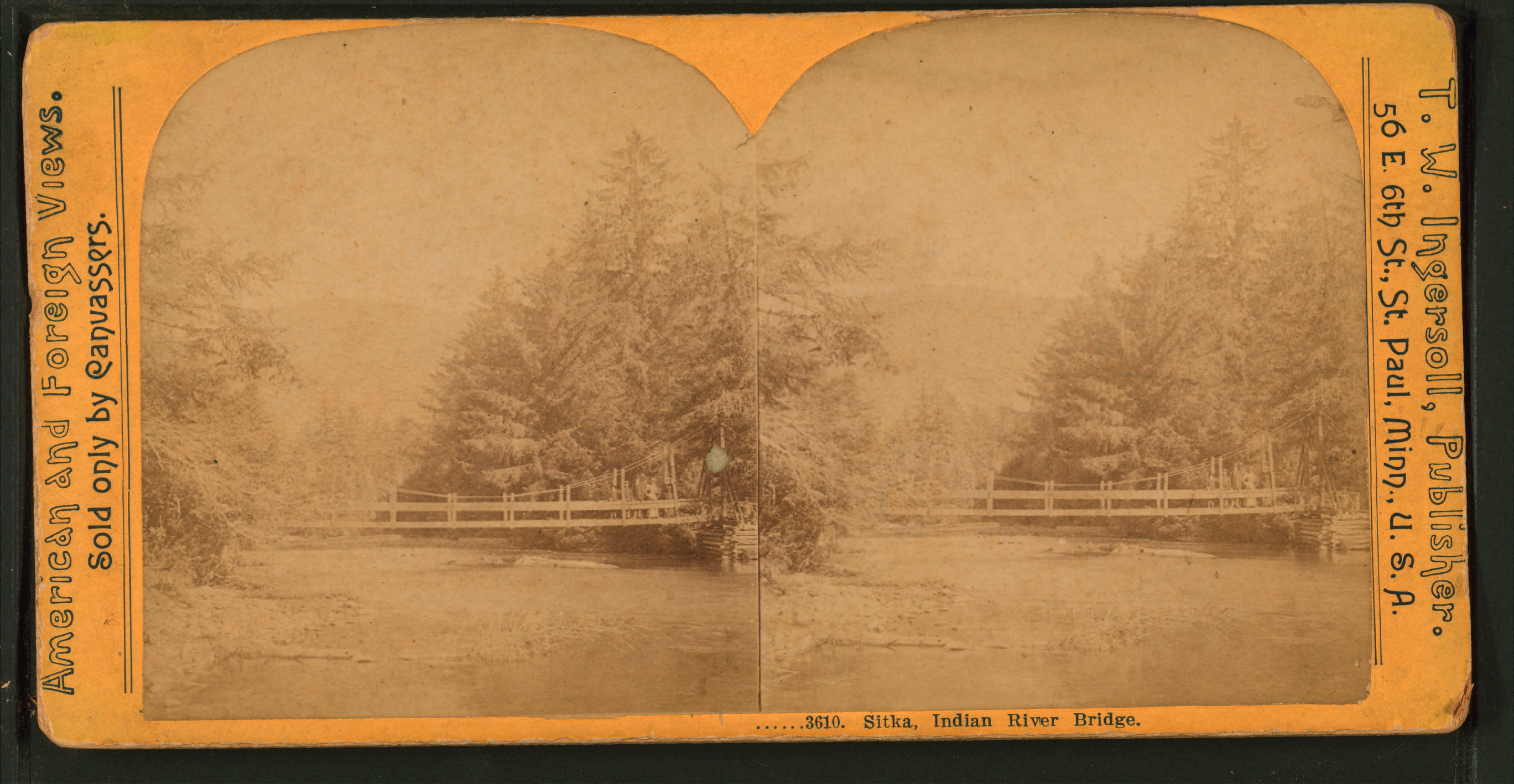
- An 1890 photograph of a bridge over Indian River
- Native name: Kaasda Héen (Tlingit)

Location
- Country: United States
- State: Alaska
- Region: Southeast Alaska
- City: Sitka

Physical characteristics
- Mouth
  - location: Sitka, Alaska
- Length: 13 km (8.1 mi)
- Discharge
  - location: Sitka National Historic Park

Indian River (Tlingit: Kaasda Héen) is a roughly eight-mile long watershed that flows through the community of Sitka on Baranof Island in the Alexander Archipelago of Southeast Alaska.

Indian River was named in 1826 by Russians colonizing the Sitka area as Reka Koloshenka. This was translated in 1883 to the English title used today.

Indian River is a large salmon-spawning stream. The river terminates in the heart of Sitka National Historical Park and passes the Alaska Raptor Center. The river extends about five miles into Baranof Island before splitting into two branches. A trail follows the southern branch to a viewpoint of a 21-meter waterfall.

Indian River played a vital role in the Battle of Sitka with the impenetrable Tlingit fort sitting just adjacent to the mouth of the river.

== See also ==
- List of Alaska rivers
