= Battle of Sitka =

Battle in the Russian colonization of Alaska

- Part of the Russo-Tlingit War and the American Indian Wars
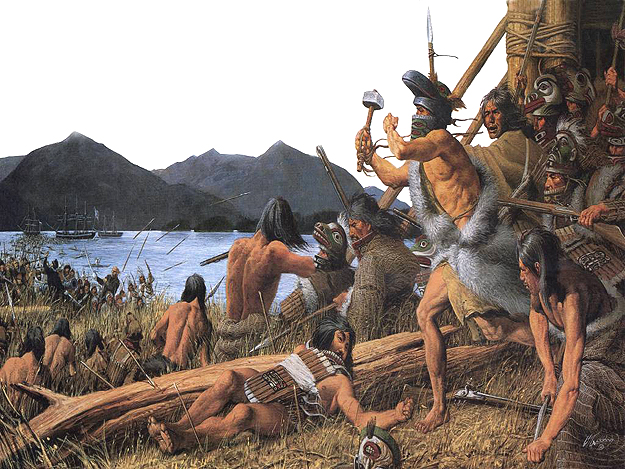
- Battle of Sitka; Louis Glanzman, 1988
Date	1–4 October 1804 (3 days)
Location	Sitka, Alaska 57°02′46″N 135°18′47″W
Result	Russian victory

Belligerents
Russia; Russian-American Company	Tlingit Kiks.ádi Clan

Commanders and leaders
(Russian Empire) Yuri Lisyansky; Alexandr Baranov	Katlian

Strength
150+ Russians; 400 Aleuts; 14 guns	750–800 (estimated)

Casualties and losses
12 killed many wounded	Unknown

The Battle of Sitka (Russian: Сражение при Ситке) in 1804 was the last major armed conflict between the Russians and Alaska Natives, and was initiated in response to the destruction of a Russian trading post two years before. The primary combatant groups were the Kiks.ádi ("Ones of Kíks", Frog/Raven) clan of Sheetʼká Xʼáatʼi (Baranof Island) of the Tlingit nation and agents of the Russian-American Company assisted by the Imperial Russian Navy.

== Background ==
Members of the Kiks.ádi of the indigenous Tlingit people had occupied portions of the Alaska Panhandle, including Sheetʼká Xʼáat'i (present-day Baranof Island), for some 11,000 years. Alexandr Baranov (Chief Manager of the Russian-American Company) first visited the island aboard the Ekaterina in 1795 while searching for new sea otter hunting grounds. Baranov paid the Tlingit a sum for the rights to the land in order to prevent "interlopers" from conducting trade on the island.

On 7 July 1799, Baranov, with 100 fellow Russians, sailed into Sitka Sound aboard the galley Olga, the brig Ekaterina, the packet boat Orel; and a fleet of some 550 baidarkas, carrying 700 Aleuts and 300 other natives.

Wishing to avoid a confrontation with the Kiks.ádi, the group passed by the strategic hilltop encampment where the Tlingit had established Noow Tlein ("Big Fort") and made landfall at their second-choice building site, some 7 miles (11 kilometers) north of the colony. The location of the Russian settlement at Katlianski Bay, "Redoubt Saint Michael", is known today as Starrigavan Bay, or "Old Harbor" (from Russian старая гавань stáraya gavanʼ) The outpost consisted of a large warehouse, blacksmith shop, cattle sheds, barracks, stockade, block house, a bath house, quarters for the hunters, and a residence for Baranov.

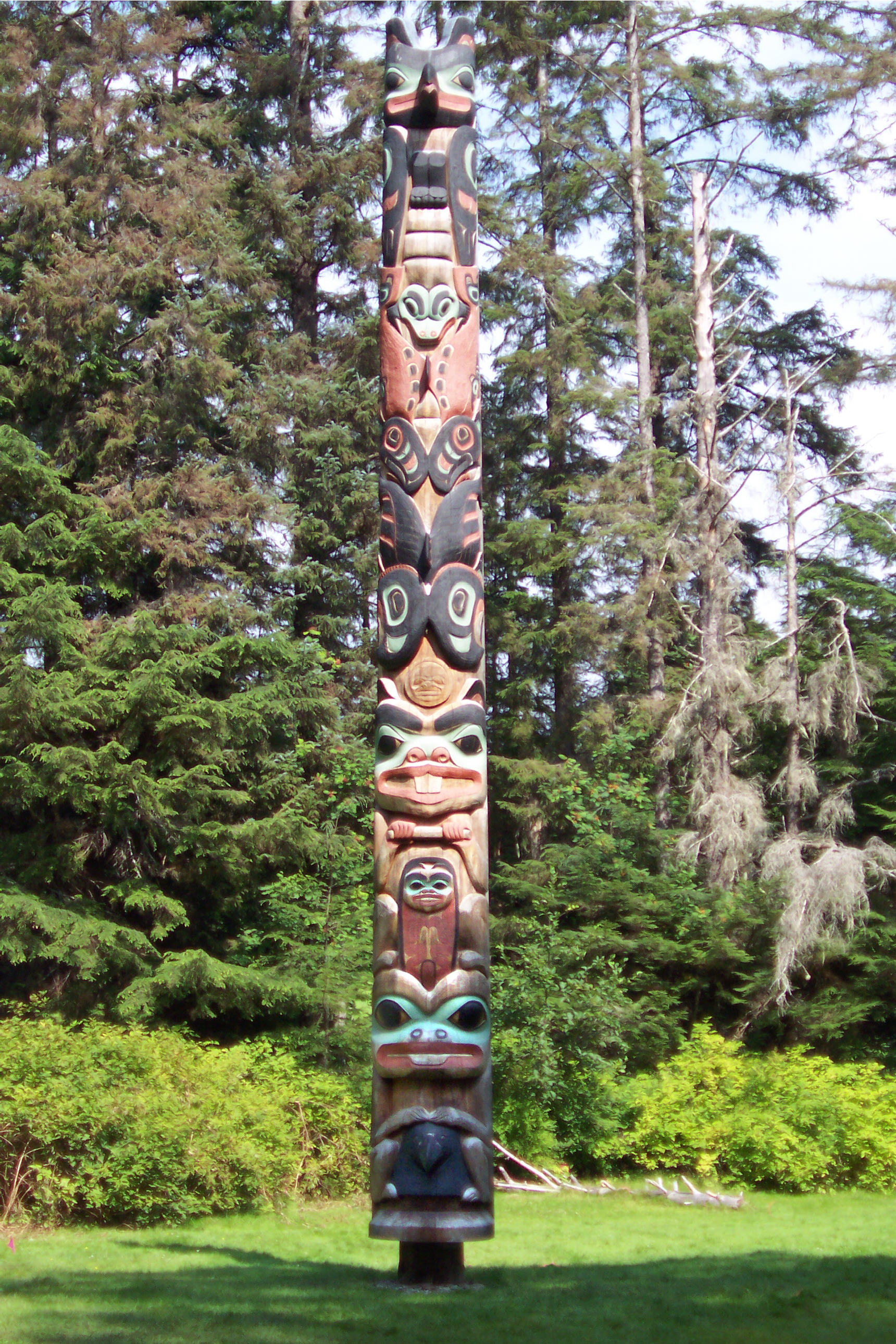
The Tlingit Ḵʼalyaan Pole, erected at the site of Fort Shís'gi Noow in Sitka National Historical Park to commemorate the lives of those lost in the Battle of Sitka.

Though the Koloshi (the Russian name for the Tlingit, based on the Alutiiq name for the Tlingit) initially welcomed the newcomers, their animosity toward the Russians grew in relatively short order. The Kiks.ádi objected to the Russian traders' custom of taking native women as their wives, and were constantly taunted by other Tlingit clans who looked upon the "Sitkas" as the outsiders' kalga, or slaves. The Kiks.ádi came to realize that the Russians' continued presence demanded their allegiance to the Tsar, and that they therefore were expected to provide free labor to the Company. Competition between the two groups for the island's resources would escalate as well.

=== 1802 battle ===
Despite a number of unsuccessful Tlingit attacks against the post during the winter of 1799, business soon prospered. Urgent matters required that Baranov return to Kodiak (then capital of Russian America) in 1800. 25 Russians and 55 Aleuts, under the direction of Vasilii G. Medvednikov, were left to staff the post. In spring 1802, the population of Redoubt Saint Michael had grown to include 29 Russians, three British deserters, 200 Aleuts, and a few Kodiak women.

In June 1802, a group of Tlingit warriors attacked the Russian fort at mid-day. Led by Skautlelt (Shḵ'awulyéil) and Kotleian, the raiding party massacred many, looted the sea otter pelts, and burned the settlement, including a ship under construction. A few Russians and Aleuts who had been away from the post hunting, or who had fled into the forest, subsequently reached safety and relayed news of the attack. The captain of the British merchantman Unicorn seized the ringleaders, rescued three Russians, 20 other native allies, and many of the pelts. The Unicorn then set sail for Kodiak, where it delivered the survivors and the news of the attack to Baranov on June 24. Barber extracted a ransom of 10,000 rubles for the return of the colonists — a mere 20% of his initial demand.

== Russian reprisal ==
Following the Kiks.ádi victory, Tlingit Shaman Stoonook, confident that the Russians would soon return, and in force, urged the clan to construct a new fortification that was capable of withstanding cannon fire, and provided an ample water supply. Despite strong opposition, the Shaman's will prevailed, and the Kiks.ádi made preparations for war. The Sitkas sent messages to their allies requesting assistance, but none was forthcoming; they would face the Russian fleet on their own.

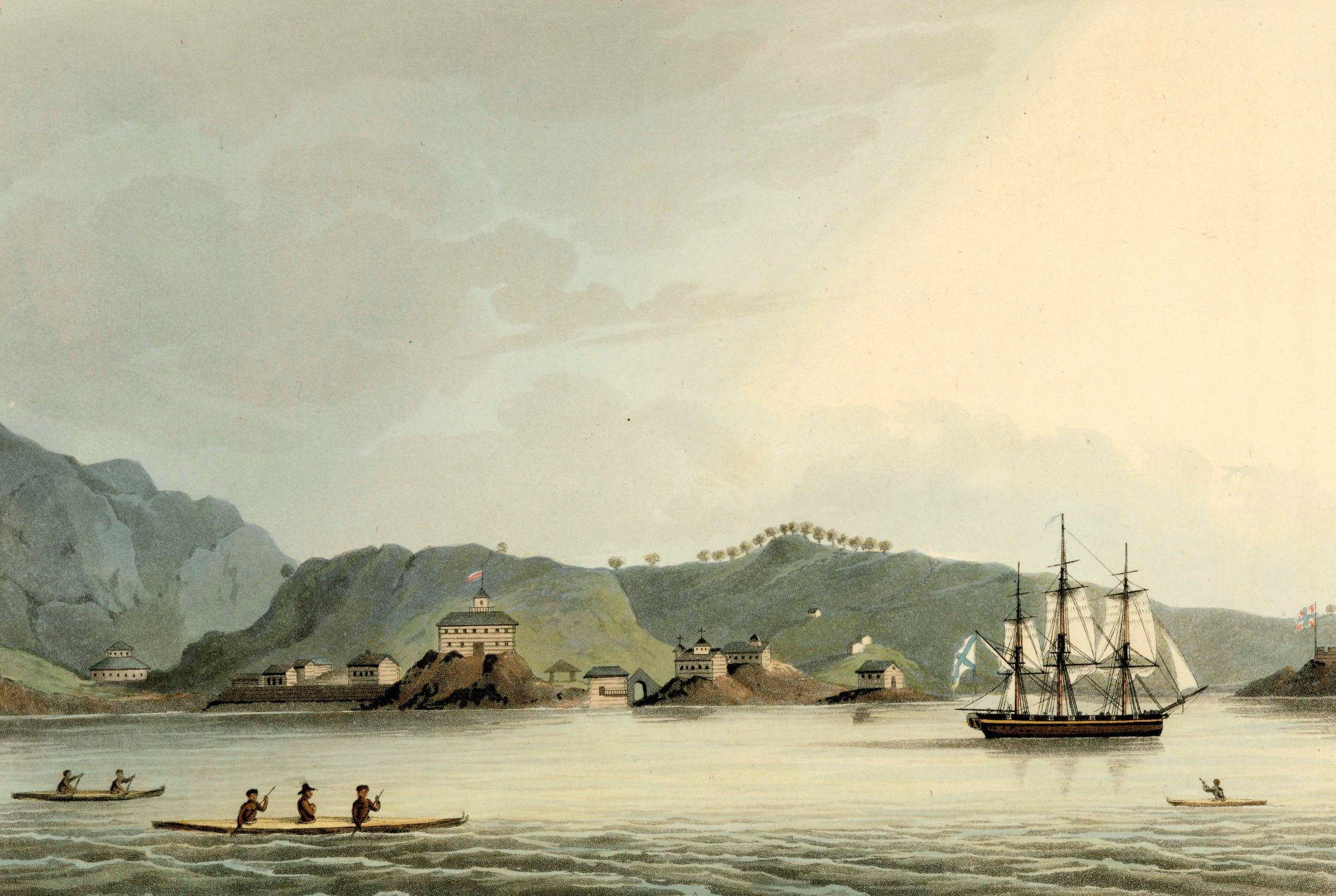
The Russian merchant sloop Neva visits Kodiak, Alaska in 1802.

The Tlingit chose to construct the roughly 240 feet by 165 feet (73 by 50 meters) Shís'gi Noow (the "Fort of Young Saplings") at the high water line near the mouth of the Indian River to take advantage of the long gravel beach flats that extend far out into the bay; it was hoped that the shallows would prevent the Russian ships from attacking the installation at close range. Some 1,000 native spruce logs were used in the construction of 14 buildings (barabaras) and the thick palisade wall that surrounded them. The Kiks.ádi battle plan was a simple one: they would gauge the Russians' strength and intentions at Noow Tlein, then strategically retreat to the perceived safety of the new fort. Baranov returned to Sitka Sound in late September 1804 aboard the sloop-of-war Neva under the command of Lieutenant Commander Yuri Feodorovich Lisyansky. Neva was accompanied by the Ermak and two other smaller, armed sailing ships, manned by 150 promyshlenniks (fur traders), along with 400–500 Aleuts in 250 baidarkas.

In this engagement, fortune favored the Russians from the outset. On September 29, the Russians went ashore at the winter village. Lisyansky dubbed the site "Novo-Arkhangel'skaya Mikhailovskaya" (or "New Archangel Saint Michael"), a reference to the largest city in the region where Governor Baranov was born. Baranov immediately sent forth envoys to the Tlingit settlement with offers of negotiation for the Noow Tlein site, all of which were rebuffed. The Tlingit merely hoped to stall the Russians long enough to allow the natives to abandon their winter village and occupy the "sapling fort" without the enemy fleet taking notice.

However, when the Kiks.ádi sent a small, armed party to retrieve their gunpowder reserves from an island in nearby Shaaseiyi Aan (Jamestown Bay), the group (electing not to wait for the cover of darkness, instead returning in broad daylight) was spotted and engaged in brief a firefight with the Russians. An errant round struck the canoe in which the Tlingit were transporting the gunpowder, igniting the cargo and causing it to explode. When the smoke cleared, it was evident that none of the expedition, comprising upper-caste young men from each house (all future Clan leaders) and a highly respected elder, survived the encounter. Baranov's emissaries notified the Tlingit that the Russian ships would soon begin firing on the new fort.

=== Day one ===
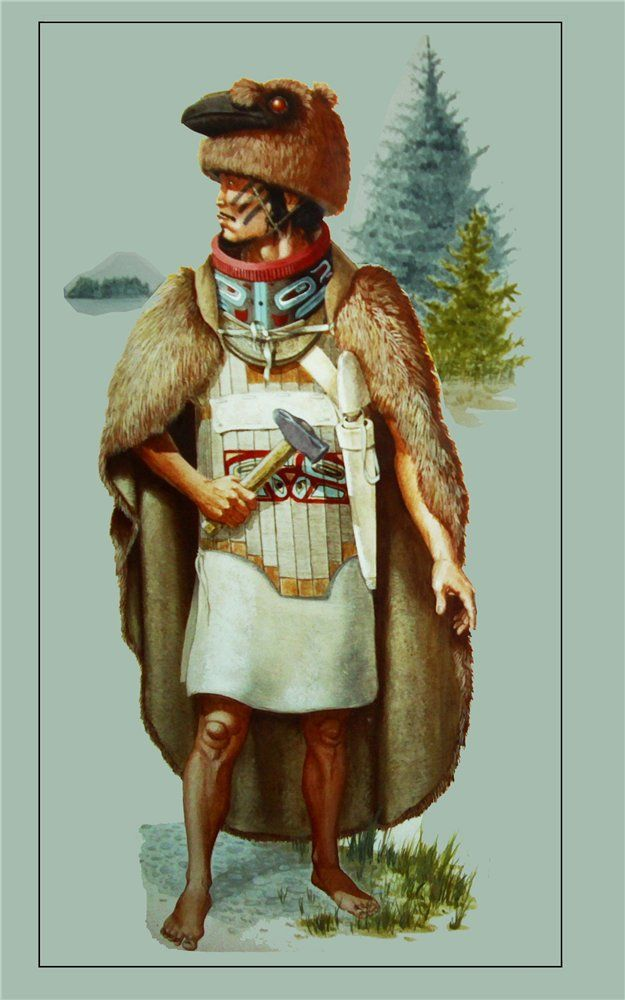
Chief Katlian

On or around October 1, Neva was towed by the Aleut from Krestof Sound into the shoals near the mouth of the Indian River. A Russian landing party, led by Baranov and accompanied by about 150 men, assaulted the Tlingit compound, only to be met by continuous volleys of gunfire. The Aleuts panicked and broke ranks, retreating to the shore where their baidarkas waited.

The Kiks.ádi warriors, led by their new War Chief Ḵʼalyaan (Katlian) — wearing a Raven mask and armed with a blacksmith's hammer, surged out of Shis'kí Noow and engaged the attacking force in hand-to-hand combat; a second wave of Tlingit emerged from the adjacent woods in a "pincer" maneuver. Baranov was seriously injured and the Russians fell back to the water's edge, just as Neva opened fire to cover the retreat. Twelve of the attackers were killed and many others injured during the melee, and the Russians were forced to abandon several small artillery pieces on the beach. Lisiansky reports only two were killed, but fourteen wounded (one mortally), and they were able to save their guns.

That night, the Tlingit rejoiced at having repulsed the Russian onslaught.

=== Day two ===
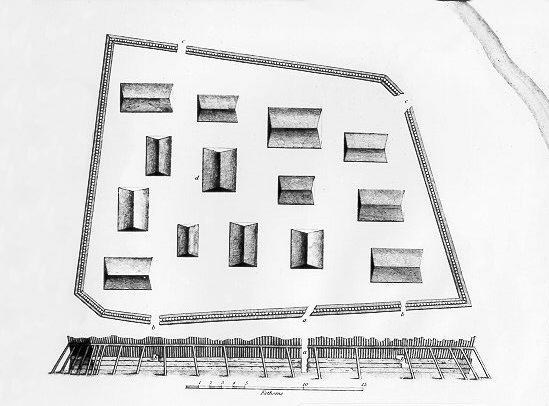
A plan and elevation sketch of the Tlingit fort Shis'kí Noow drawn by Yuri Lisyansky after the Battle of Sitka in 1804. The Indian River flows through the upper right corner of Lisyansky's drawing.

In as much as Baranov's battlefield wounds prevented him from continuing the battle, Lieutenant Commander Lisyansky assumed command, ordering his ships to begin shore bombardment of the Tlingit position. The initial barrage consisted mainly of "ranging shots" as the vessels attempted to determine the optimum firing range. Unable to breach the fort's walls, the Russians ceased fire in the early afternoon and sent a messenger ashore under a flag of truce. According to Lisyansky,

It was constructed of wood, so thick and strong, that the shot from my guns could not penetrate it at the short distance of a cable's length.

Much to the Kiks.ádi's amusement, the message demanded their surrender, which they rejected out of hand. The Tlingit replied with their own demand that the Russians surrender, which was also rejected. The Russian cannon fire resumed until nightfall. After dark, the Kiks.ádi met to consider their situation. They all believed that the Russians suffered too many losses the day before to mount another ground attack. The Tlingit's goal had been to hold out long enough to allow the northern clans to arrive and reinforce their numbers, but the shortage of gunpowder limited their ability to remain under siege, a factor that made ultimate victory seem less likely. The Tlingit concluded that a change in tactics was in order: rather than suffer the ignominy of defeat on the battlefield, they formulated a strategy wherein the Clan would disappear into the surrounding forest (where they felt that the Russians could not engage them) and establish a new settlement on the northern part of the island.

=== Day three ===
Neva and her escorts resumed their day-long bombardment of the Tlingit fort at sunrise. The Kiks.ádi responded with offers of a truce, hostage exchanges, promises of more talks, and even the possibility of surrender. Unbeknownst to the Russians, the Clan's elderly and young children had already begun the trek to G̱aajaa Héen (Old Sitka). At nightfall, the House Chiefs met again to discuss their planned march across the island. Mothers with infant children were to depart in the morning.

=== Day four ===
The naval cannon fire began at daybreak, halting periodically to allow the Russians to extend offers of peace to the Kiks.ádi, which were in turn rejected. That afternoon, the Tlingits' response was that they had tired of battle, and would accede to the Russian demands to evacuate Shís'gi Noow the following day. Once the sun had set, the natives held their last gathering in the sapling fort. The elders offered praise for their clansmen who had defended the Kiks.ádi homeland against a formidable enemy. The Clan gathered together for a last song, one that ended with a loud drum roll and a wail of anguish (which the Russians interpreted as a sign of their surrender).

The Tlingit then departed undetected under the cover of darkness.

== Aftermath ==
It was not until the evening of 4 October that the Kiks.ádi began their retreat. The Russians landed a large contingent of troops to secure the beachhead and to reconnoiter the area in and around Shís'gi Noow. To their great surprise, none of the natives were to be found as, unbeknownst to the Russians, the Tlingit had embarked on what is now referred to as the "Sitka Kiks.ádi Survival March".

On 8 October, Captain Lisianski visited the abandoned Tlingit fortification, in which he estimated eight hundred males lived, and recorded:

...what anguish did I feel, when I saw, like a second massacre of innocents, numbers of young children lying together murdered, lest their cries, if they had been borne away with their cruel parents, should have led to a discovery of the retreat...

The fort was razed to preclude the possibility of its being used as a stronghold against the Russians and their allies ever again. Neva sailed out of Sitka Sound on 10 November.

In January 2021, the fort was rediscovered using electromagnetic induction.

=== "Sitka Kiks.ádi Survival March" ===
The first leg of the Tlingit's sojourn entailed a hike west from Gajaa Héen to Daxéit (the Clan's fishing camp at Nakwasina Sound, where each May the Kiks.ádi harvested herring eggs, a traditional native food). From there, the group's exact path across the mountains north to Cháatl Ḵáa Noow (the Kiks.ádi "Halibut Man Fort" at Point Craven in the Peril Strait) is a matter of some conjecture. However, a coastal route around the bays of northwest Baranof Island appears to be the most likely course as it would have allowed the travelers to circumvent the Island's dense forests, based on significant firsthand research into the event conducted by Herb and Frank Hope of the Sheetʼká Ḵwáan — Sitka Tribe of Alaska. Canoes fashioned out of red cedar trunks facilitated the ocean crossing to Chichagof Island.

Several warriors remained in the vicinity of Noow Tlein after the Battle as a sort of rear guard, in order to both harass the Russian settlers and to prevent them from pursuing the Kiks.ádi during their flight north. Shortly thereafter, eight Aleut trappers were killed in Jamestown Bay and another was shot in the woods adjacent to New Archangel. From that point forward, Russian hunting parties went out in force, ever alert to the possibility of attack. The Kiks.ádi encouraged other Tlingit clans to avoid contact with the Russians by any means possible.

In November, 1805, Cháatl Ḵáa Noow was visited by John DeWolf and Georg von Langsdorff from Sitka, with several Alutiiq men and the daughter of a Tlingit clan head to serve as translator, provided by Baranov. The visit lasted two days. DeWolf and Langsdorff's writings provide some useful information on the state of affairs at the time.

=== Fall of Yakutat ===
On August 20, 1805, warriors of the Eyak clan led by Tanukh and Lushwak, and their allies from the Tlingit clan, burned Yakutat and killed the Russians who remained there. The attack was carefully planned and organized by Tanukh, who entered the fortress and killed the commander of the fortress, after which, according to Indian legends, at his signal, "every warrior killed his Russian." Of the entire population of the Russian colony in Yakutat in 1805, according to official data, 14 Russians died "and with them many more islanders," that is, Kodiak and Chugach. The fall of Yakutat was another heavy blow to the Russian colonies. An important economic and strategic base on the coast of America was lost.

=== Russian Alaska ===
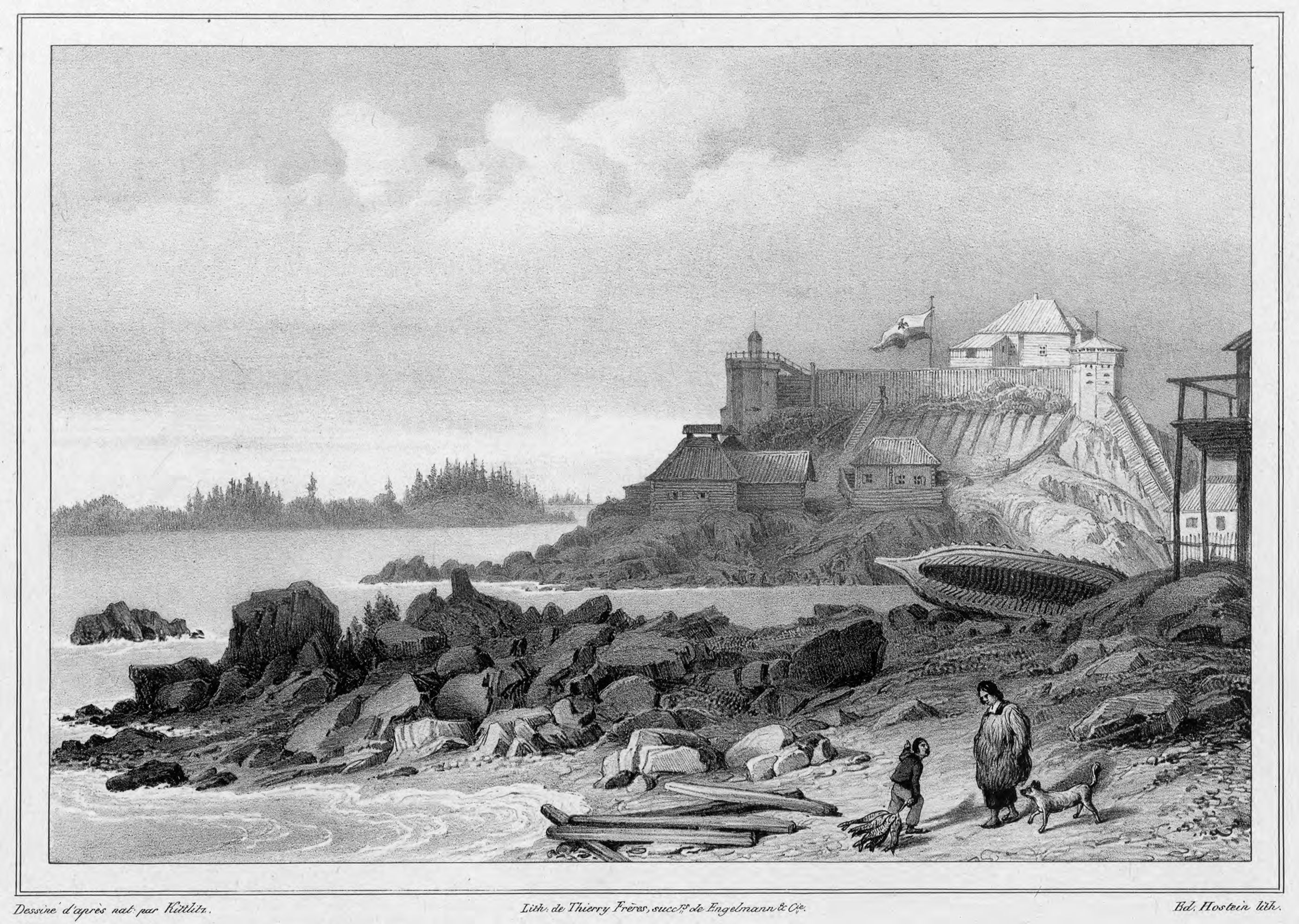
The Russian palisade atop "Castle Hill" (Noow Tlein) in Gájaa Héen (Old Sitka), c. 1827.

Atop the kekoor (hill) at Noow Tlein, the Russians constructed a fortress (krepostʼ) of their own, consisting of a high wooden palisade with three watchtowers (armed with 32 cannons) for defense against Tlingit attacks.

By the summer of 1805, a total of eight buildings had been erected inside the compound, including workshops, barracks, and the Governor's Residence. Aside from their annual expeditions to "Herring Rock" near the mouth of the Indian River, the Kiks.ádi by-and-large steered clear of the ever-expanding settlement until 1821, when the Russians (who intended to profit from the natives' hunting prowess, and to put an end to the sporadic attacks on the village) invited the Tlingit to return to Sitka, which was designated as the new capital of Russian America in 1808.

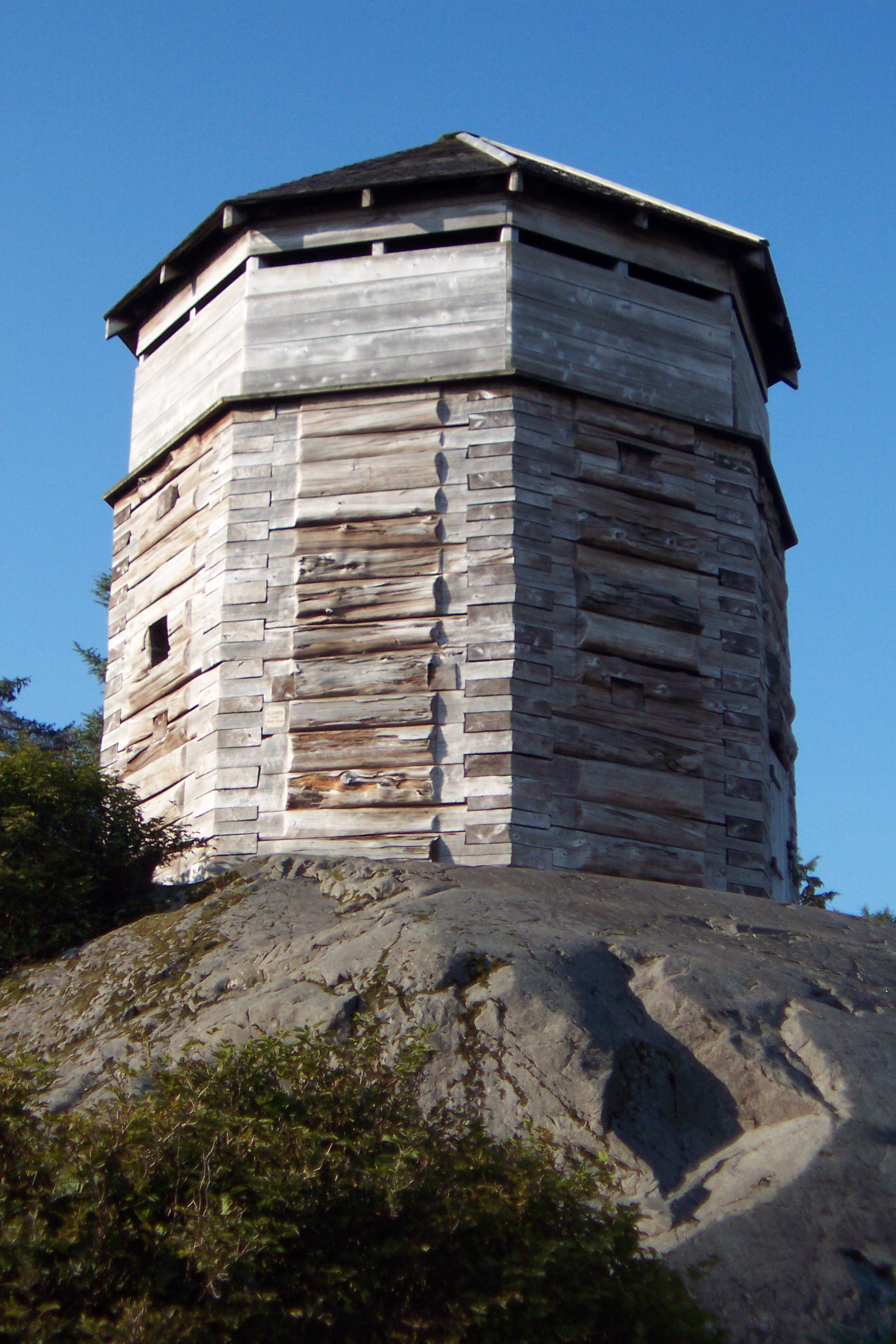
A replica of Russian Block House #1 (one of three watchtowers that guarded the stockade walls at Old Sitka) as constructed by the National Park Service in 1962.

The Tlingit who chose to return were allowed to reside in a part of the village just below the heavily guarded stockade on "Blockhouse Hill" (an area known as the Ranche until around 1965). Russian cannon were constantly trained on the natives as a reminder of their defeat at Shís'gi Noow. The Kiks.ádi supplied the Russians with food and otter pelts, while the colonists introduced the Tlingit to the various aspects of Russian culture and the Russian Orthodox Church. Occasional acts of Tlingit aggression continued until 1858, with one significant uprising (though quickly quelled) occurring in 1855.

In 1867, Russian America was sold to the U.S. After that, all the holdings of the Russian–American Company's holdings were liquidated. Following the transfer, many elders of the local Tlingit tribe maintained that "Castle Hill" comprised the only land that Russia was entitled to sell. Native land claims were not addressed until the latter half of the 20th century, with the signing of the Alaska Native Claims Settlement Act.

The 1880 census reported a population of 43 Tlingit living in and around the Indian River, the Kiks.ádi's traditional summer fishing camp.

=== Tributes ===
U.S. President Benjamin Harrison set aside the Shís'gi Noow site for public use in 1890. Sitka National Historical Park was established on the battle site on October 18, 1972 "...to commemorate the Tlingit and Russian experiences in Alaska." Today, the K'alyaan Pole stands guard over the Shís'gi Noow site to honor the Tlingit casualties. Ta Eetí, a memorial to the Russian sailors who died in the Battle, is across the Indian River at site of the Russians' landing. In September 2004, in observance of the Battle's bicentennial, descendants of the combatants from both sides joined in a traditional Tlingit "Cry Ceremony" to formally mourn their lost ancestors. The next day, the Kiks.ádi hosted a formal reconciliation ceremony to "put away" their two centuries of grief.

== Historic designations ==
- National Register of Historic Places #NPS–66000162 — "Baranof Castle Hill" site
- National Register of Historic Places #NPS–66000164 — "Battle of Sitka" site
- National Register of Historic Places #NPS–66000166 — Old Sitka ("Redoubt Saint Michael") site

== See also ==
- Sitka City and Borough, Alaska
- Sitka National Historical Park
- List of conflicts in the United States
- Awa'uq Massacre
