= Statue of Alexander Andreyevich Baranov =

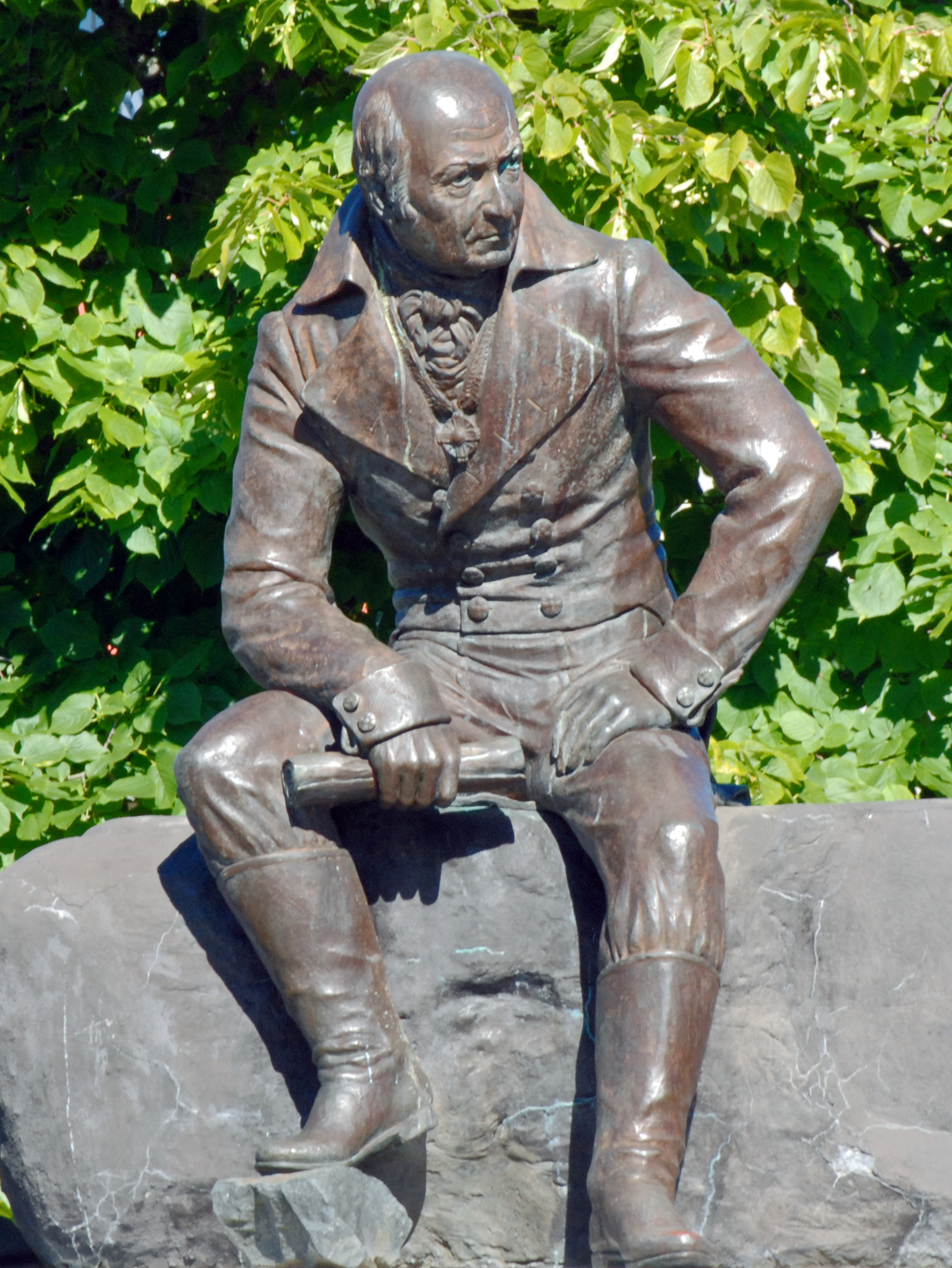
- The statue in 2007
- Interactive map of Statue of Alexander Andreyevich Baranov
- Location: Sitka, Alaska, U.S.
- Coordinates: 57°2′58.77″N 135°19′56.14″W
- Dedicated to: Alexander Andreyevich Baranov
- Dismantled date: 2020

A bronze statue of Alexander Andreyevich Baranov, the first governor of Russian America, is located in Sitka, Alaska.

Baranov oversaw the enslavement of Tlingit and Aleut people. The statue was donated to the city of Sitka in 1989 by Lloyd and Barbara Hames and saw immediate controversy. Its nose was cut off in an act of vandalism on the night prior to its official dedication outside of the Harrgian Centennial Hall, forcing the statue's artist to repair it with putty. It was vandalized again in 2013.

The memorial saw protest in 2020 due to the controversy surrounding Baranov as a historical figure. A petition to remove the statue gained 2,000 signatures. The statue had previously been on outdoor public display and was removed amidst controversy by a 2020 vote of the Sitka town council. Following the vote, it was relocated to Sitka's history museum.

== See also ==
- List of monuments and memorials removed during the George Floyd protests
- Baranof totem pole
