= Mikhail Tikhanov =

Russian painter

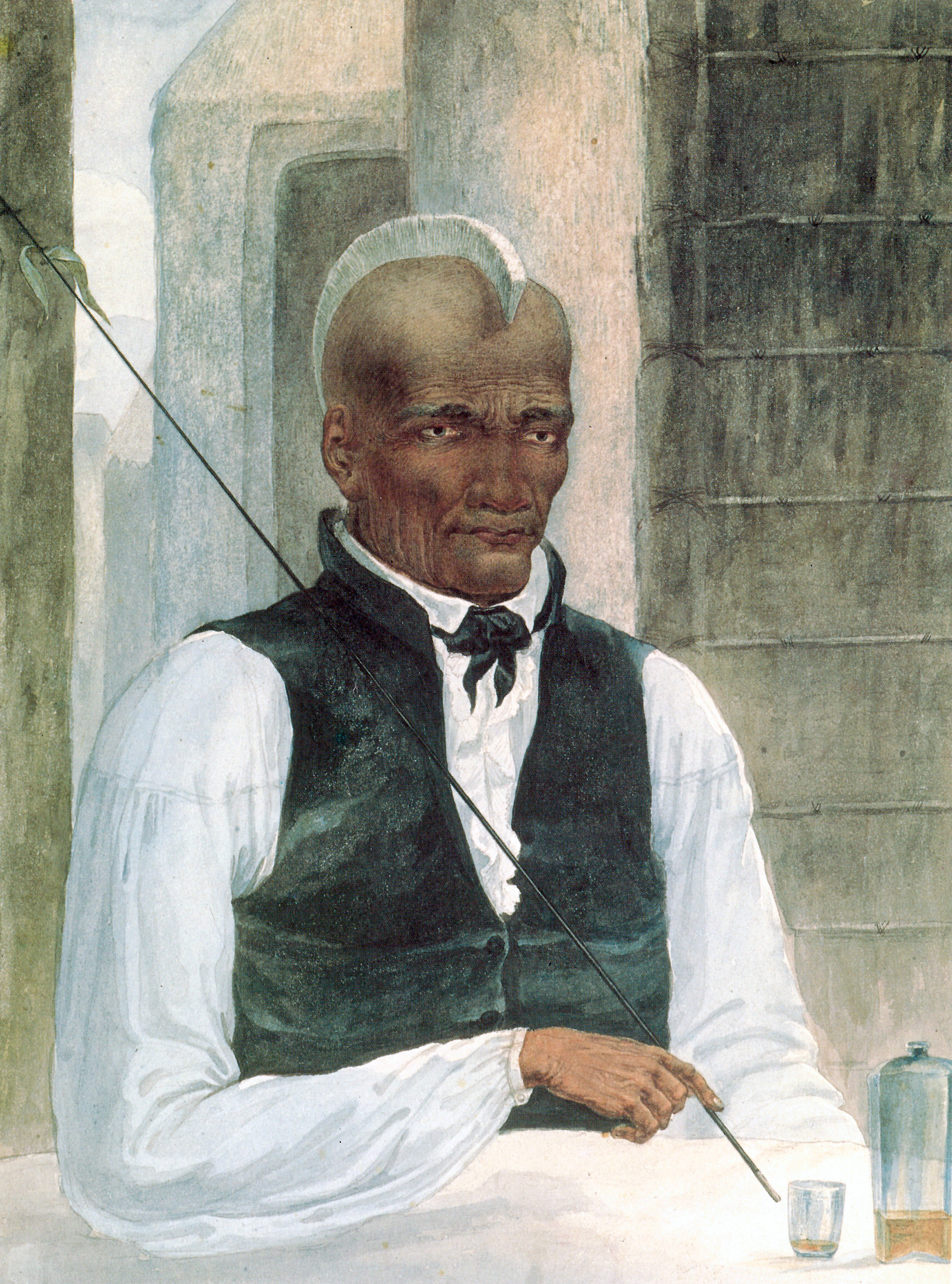
Kamehameha, King of the Sandwich Islanders, 1818

Mikhail Tikhonovich Tikhanov (Михаил Тихонович Тиханов; 1789–1862) was a Russian artist who accompanied Captain Vasily Golovnin's circumnavigation aboard the frigate Kamchatka.

== Biography ==
Born a serf in 1789, Tikhanov showed artistic talent at the age of seventeen and was sent by his master Prince Nikolay Alexeevich Golitsyn to the Imperial Academy of Arts in Saint Petersburg. Freed in 1815, he worked at the Academy before being recommended by Alexey Olenin for the post of an expeditionary artist for Captain Vasily Golovnin and the expedition of the Kamchatka around the world.

During the voyage from 1817 to 1819, Tikhanov painted at least 43 different pictures of important figures and scenes from Russian North America, Alaska, California and Hawaii. He specialized in human portraits and painted figures including Hawaiian notables King Kamehameha I and High Chief Boki, as well as Russian colonial governor Alexander Andreyevich Baranov. Hawaiian scholar David W. Forbes stated his works done in Hawaii were "among the most mysterious, haunting portrayals of Pacific Islanders ever created". His paintings done in Northern California, including one of a man named Balthazar, are the only known depictions of Bodega Bay Coast Miwok.

Despite having the support of the Russian government, prints of Mikhail Tikhanov's work were delayed, lost, and forgotten shortly after his return. It was not until 1971 that an incomplete collection of his work, featuring 22 prints, was first published in Russia. Several later books about Tikhanov has unearthed further works from him, and a collection of his water colours are on display at the Moscow Museum of Art.

=== Illness and death ===
On the voyage home in 1818, Tikhanov became seriously ill while the Kamchatka was in Manila in the Philippines. Afterward, he started showing signs of mental illness and was placed in a hospital in Saint Petersburg. Despite a brief period where he showed signs of improvement, he relapsed and never recovered his sanity or worked again. He lived off a disability stipend for the rest of his life. From 1824 until his death in 1862, he spent the remainder of his life in the care of a widow of one of his colleagues. Although some of his works were later published by Captain Golovnin in his account of the expedition, most of his works were never published in his lifetime. His works are now in the Museum of the Russian Academy of Arts in Saint Petersburg.

== Gallery ==
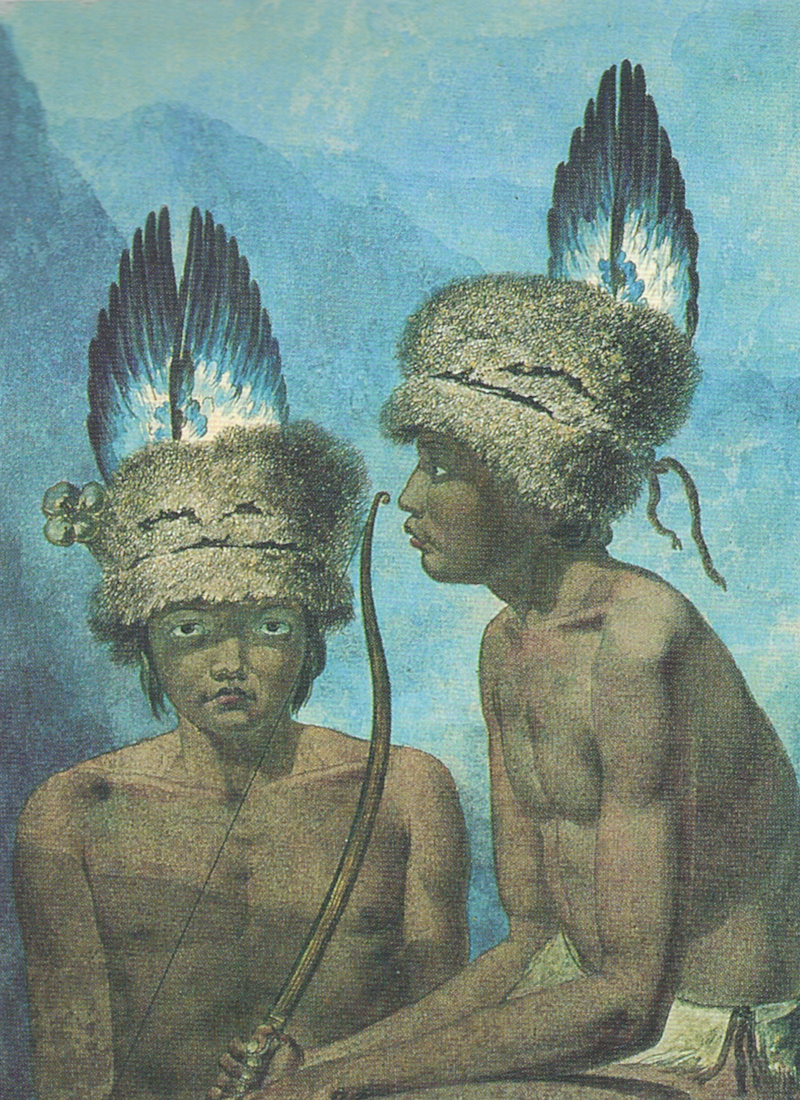
Balthazar, Inhabitant of Northern California, 1818

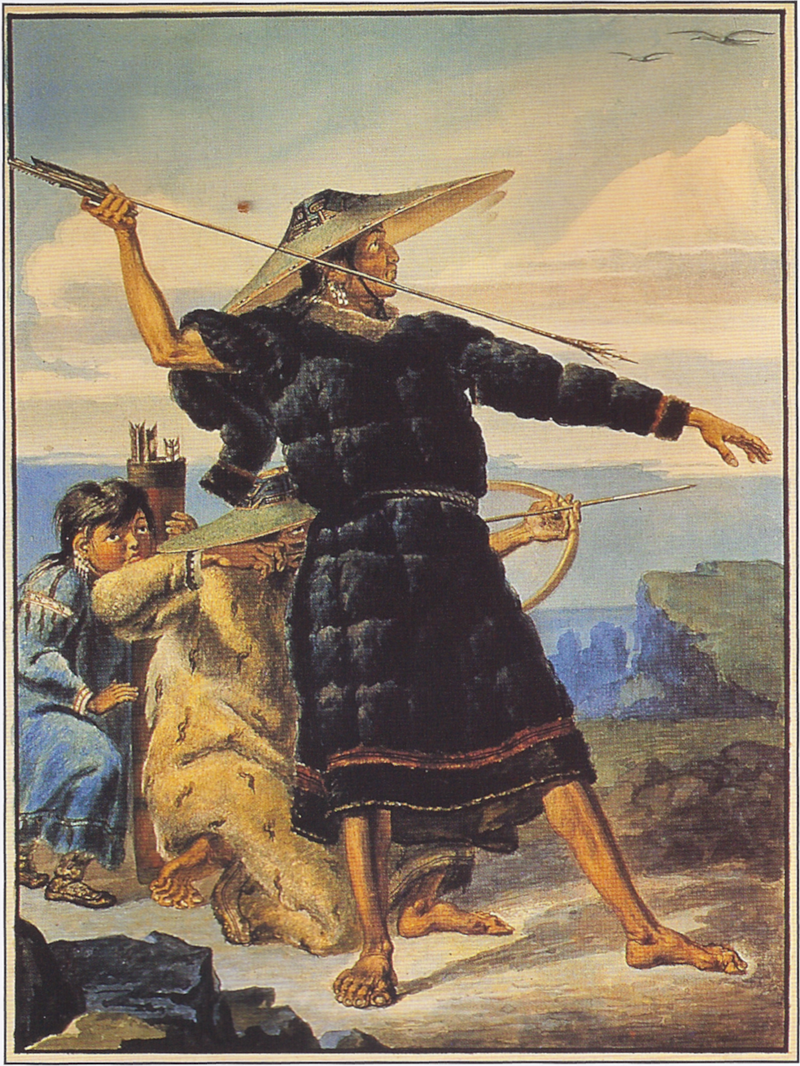
Aleut in Festival Dress in Alaska, 1818

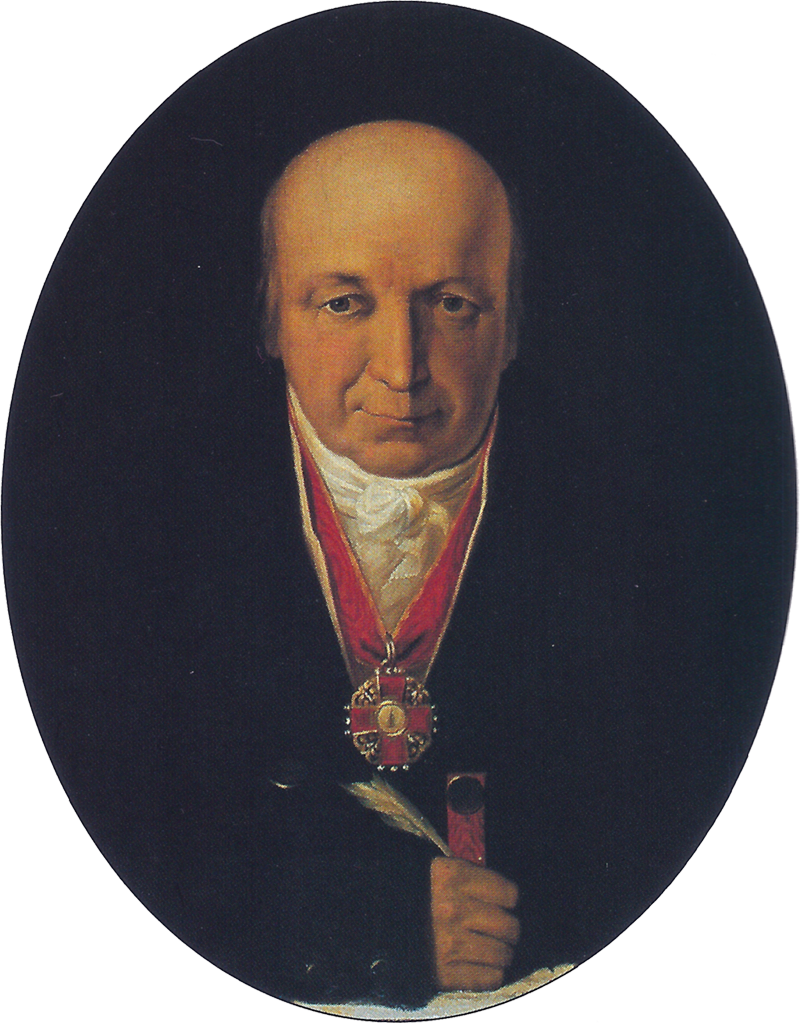
Alexandr Andreyevich Baranov, 1818

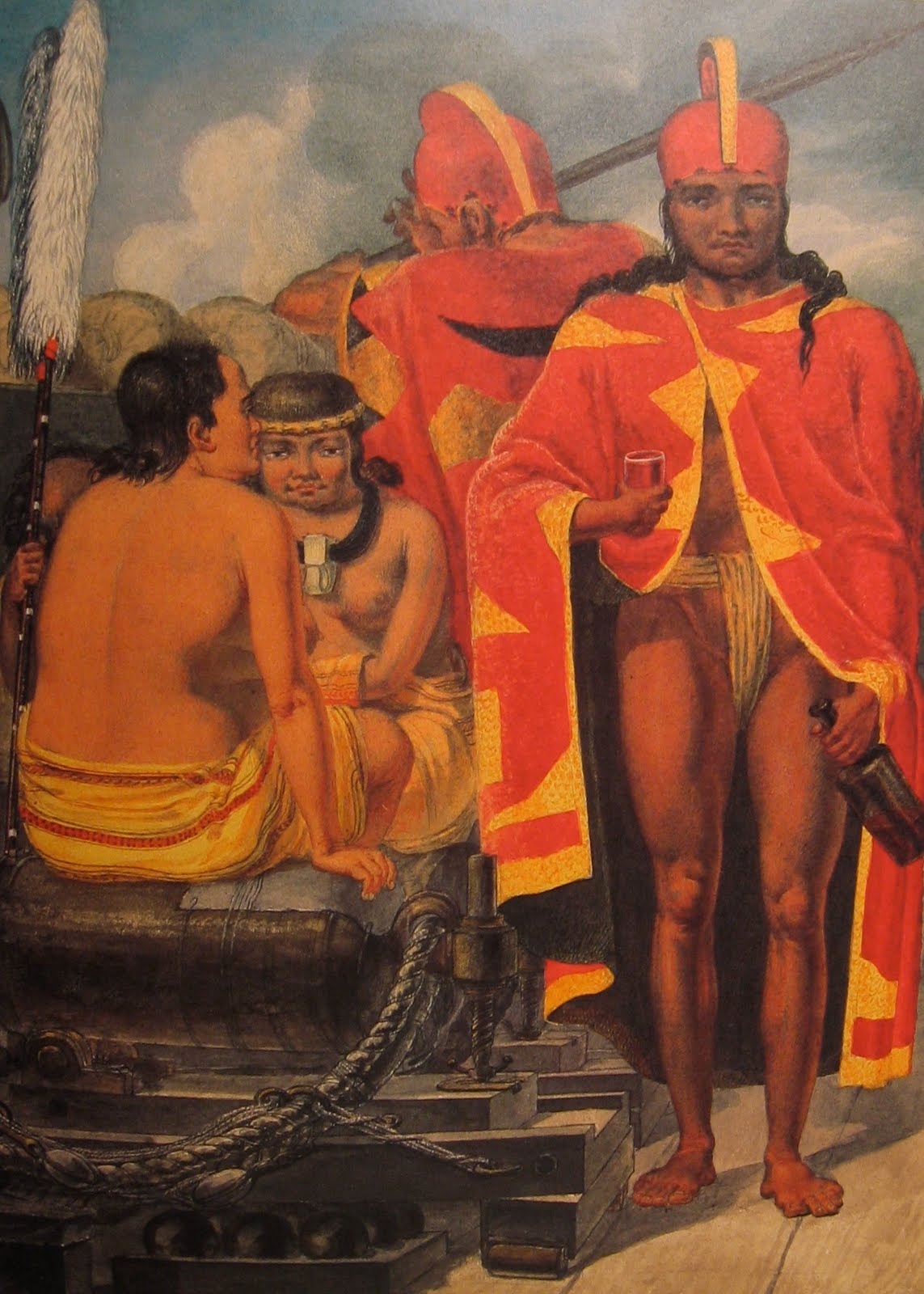
Boki, Chief of Oahu, and Hekili, Minister of the Navy, 1818

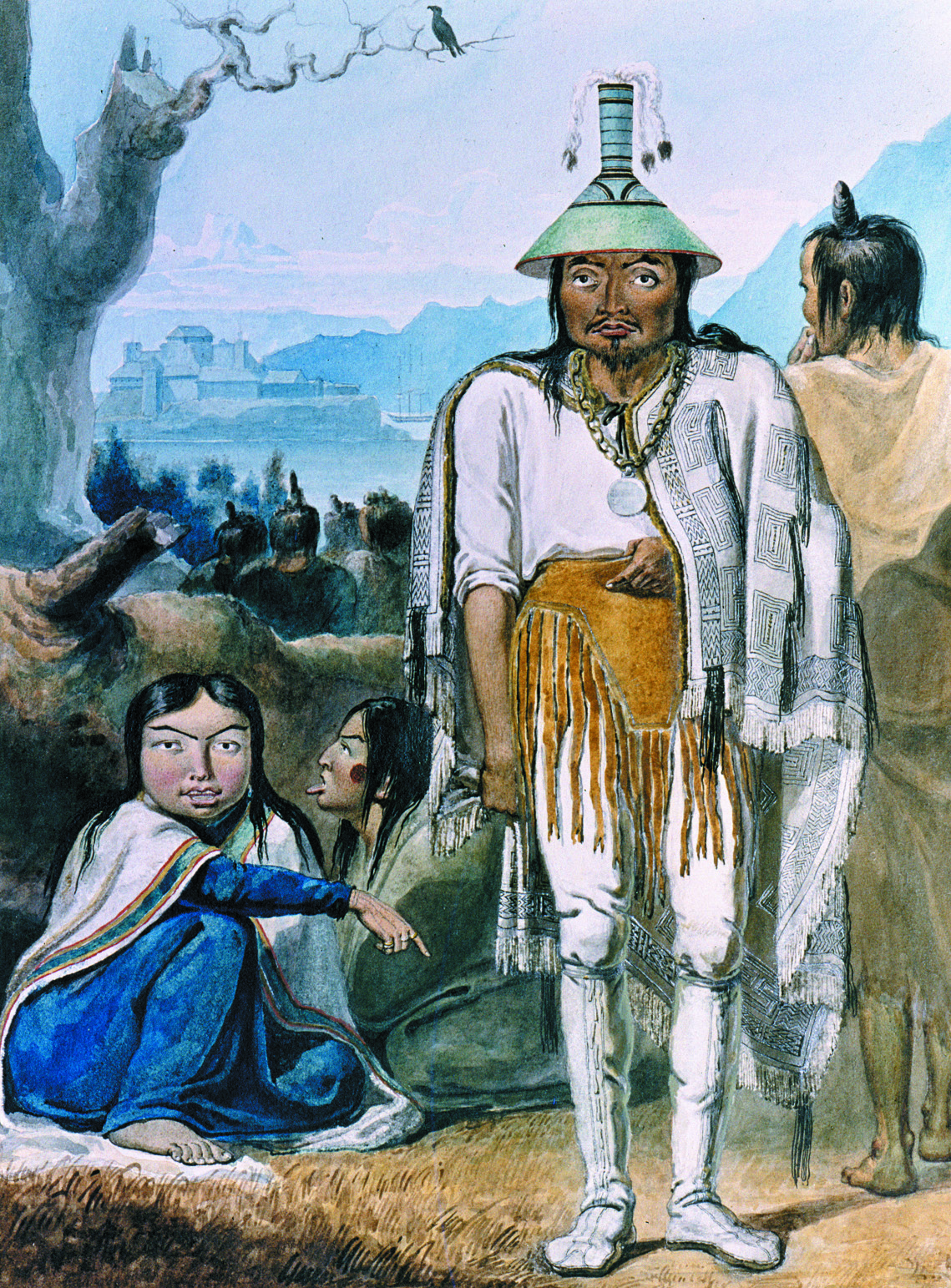
Sitka Island Chief Katlian With His Wife, 1818
