= Proud Raven, Panting Wolf =

2018 non-fiction book

Proud Raven, Panting Wolf: Carving Alaska's New Deal Totem Parks
- Author: Emily L. Moore
- Publisher: University of Washington Press
- Publication date: 2018
- ISBN: 978-0-295-743-93-6

Proud Raven, Panting Wolf: Carving Alaska's New Deal Totem Parks is a non-fiction book by Emily L. Moore about the involvement of the Civilian Conservation Corps in the creation of several totem parks across Southeast Alaska. It was published in 2018 by the University of Washington Press.

== General references ==
- Jonaitis, Aldona (2019-03-01). "Proud Raven, Panting Wolf: Carving Alaska's New Deal Totem Parks. By Emily L. Moore". American Indian Culture and Research Journal. 43 (2).
- Legg, John R. (September 2022). "Proud Raven, Panting Wolf: Carving Alaska's New Deal Totem Parks by Emily L. Moore (review)". Native American and Indigenous Studies. 9 (2): 169–170. doi:10.1353/nai.2022.a863606. ISSN 2332-127X.
- Montiel, Anya (2020-05-03). "Proud Raven, Panting Wolf: Carving Alaska's New Deal Totem Parks". The Journal of Modern Craft. 13 (2): 219–222. doi:10.1080/17496772.2020.1790117. ISSN 1749-6772.
- Seltz, Jennifer (2021-10-02). "Proud Raven, Panting Wolf: Carving Alaska's New Deal Totem Parks: by Emily L. Moore, Seattle, University of Washington, 2018, 252 pp., $29.95 (paper), ISBN 978-0-295-74755-2". American Review of Canadian Studies. 51 (4): 680–682. doi:10.1080/02722011.2021.1996933. ISSN 0272-2011.
