= Alexander Andreyevich Baranov =

Russian trader, merchant and first governor of Russian America (1747–1819)

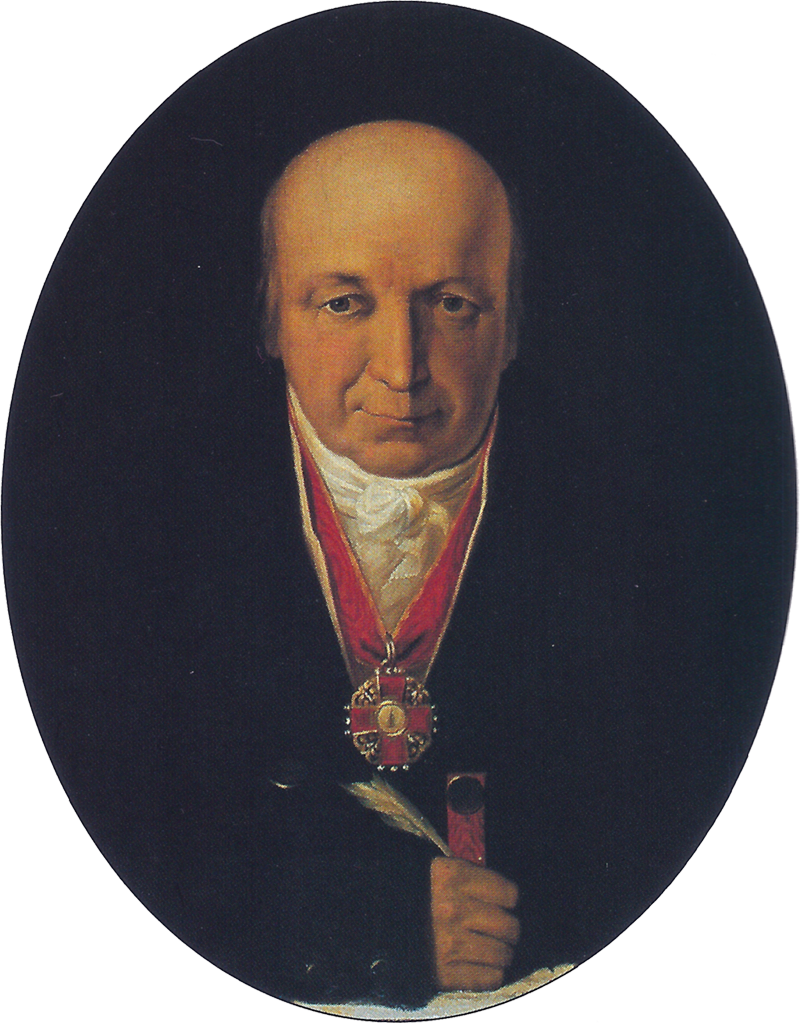
- Alexander Andreyevich Baranov painted by Mikhail Tikhanov

1st Governor of Russian America
- In office 9 July 1799 – 11 January 1818
- Preceded by: Position established
- Succeeded by: Ludwig von Hagemeister

Personal details
- Born: 14 February 1747 Kargopol, St. Petersburg Governorate, Russian Empire
- Died: 28 April 1819 (aged 72) Sunda Strait, Dutch East Indies

Alexander Andreyevich Baranov (Russian: Александр Андреевич Баранов; 14 February [O.S. 3 February] 1747 – 28 April [O.S. 16 April] 1819), sometimes spelled Aleksandr or Alexandr and Baranof, was a Russian trader and merchant, who worked for some time in Siberia. He was recruited by the Shelikhov-Golikov Company for trading in Russian America, beginning in 1790 with a five-year contract as manager of the outpost. He continued to serve past the end date of his contract.

In 1799 Baranov was promoted, appointed by the recently chartered Russian-American Company as Chief Manager, effectively the first governor of Russian America. He served until 1818. This was the early colonial period of expansion of settlements. He founded Pavlovskaya (Kodiak) and later New Archangel (Sitka), Russian colonies that were bases of the company in present-day Alaska. In addition, he oversaw the expansion of the lucrative fur trade with Alaska Natives. He engaged in brutal tactics to extract wealth from Alaska. He demanded tribute in the forms of furs from native peoples, a practice known as Yasak. To enforce the demands for tribute, he took hostages and demanded furs in exchange for release of hostages.

He continued to support his Russian wife and children, who had moved from Siberia back to live near St. Petersburg. In Pavlovskaya, Baranov took an Aleut woman as mistress and had three mixed-race children with her. After learning that his wife had died in 1807 in Russia, he married his mistress, legitimizing their children. In 1817 Irina, his oldest daughter born in Alaska, married Semyon Yanovsky, a Russian naval officer. Late in 1818, Yanovsky was appointed as Chief Manager and successor to Baranov. That year Baranov departed to sail back to Russia, but he died in April 1819 and was buried at sea.

== Early life and family ==
Alexander Andreyevich Baranov was born in 1747 in Kargopol, in St. Petersburg Governorate of the Russian Empire. He was the son of Andrey Baranov, a lower-class resident of a city or mestchanin, in the Russian stratified order of classes. Baranov ran away from home at the young age of fifteen and went to Moscow, where he became a clerk before returning home.

After he married and his first child (a daughter) was born, Baranov took his young family to Siberia for its frontier opportunities. In Irkutsk, he became a trader and tax collector with his brother. Eventually, his wife left Baranov and returned to Kargopol with their daughter and two young children they had adopted. There was no divorce in the Russian Orthodox Church. Baranov supported them all from afar.

== Establishment of Russian America ==
Due to business reverses that had left Baranov nearly bankrupt, he was lured to Russian America by opportunities offered by Grigory Ivanovich Shelikhov, a merchant and developer who had established a settlement on Kodiak Island to enhance the growing Russian maritime fur trade there. Baranov accepted a five-year contract starting in the fall of 1790 to be the chief manager of the Shelikhov-Golikov Company, and to establish and manage additional trading posts in the Kodiak Island region.

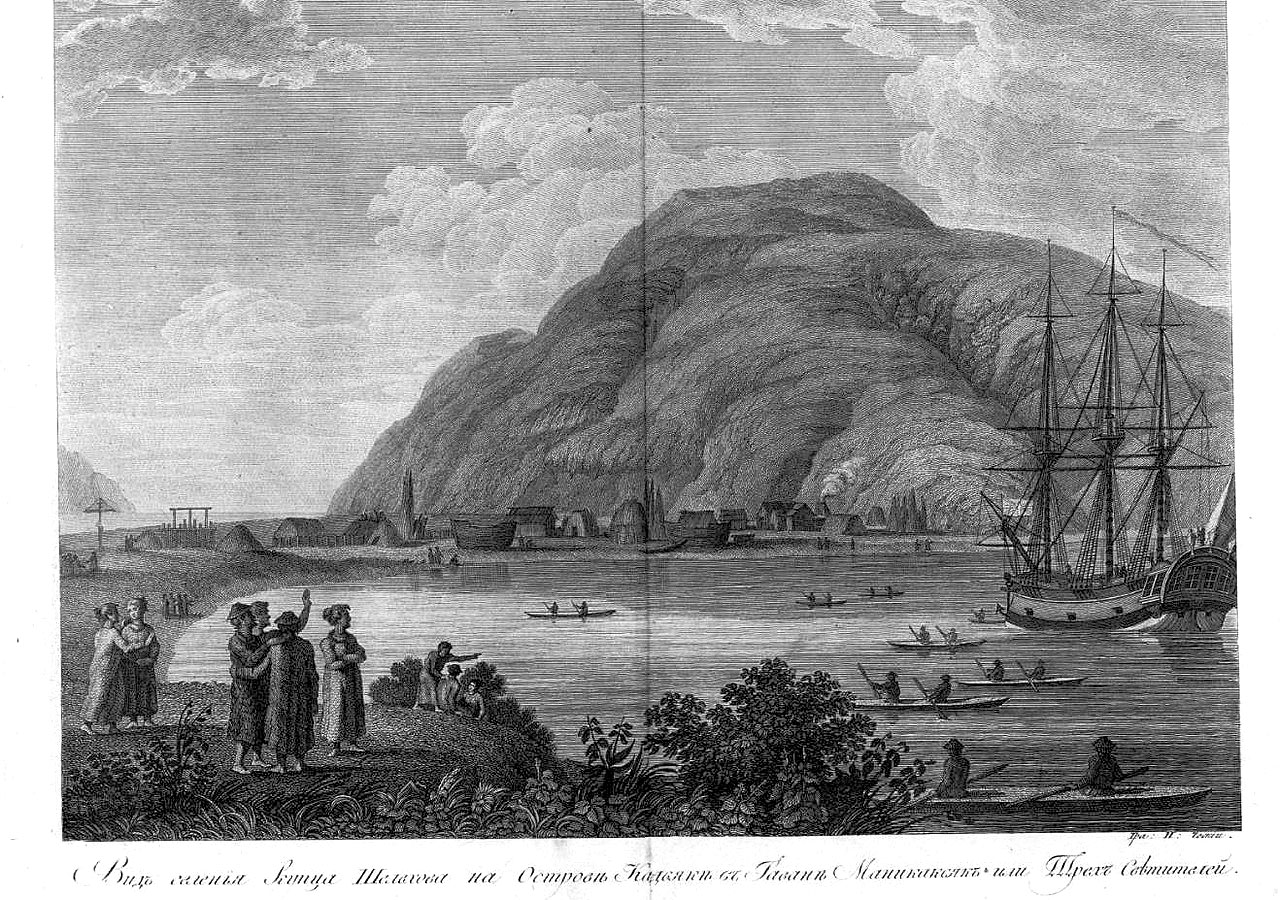
Three Saints Bay was the first permanent Russian settlement in Alaska.

En route in 1790 from Okhotsk, Siberia to Kodiak Island of Russian America, Baranov suffered the wreck of his ship in October on Unalaska Island, an Aleutian Island close to the Alaska Peninsula. It was about 600 miles from Kodiak. With critical help from the local indigenous Aleut people, Baranov and his shipmates survived the winter. They continued their journey via Native sea-going boats in the spring of 1791 and reached Kodiak Island.

In 1792, Baranov moved the Russian settlement from Three Saints Bay, which had too constrained an area to succeed, to what they called Pavlovskaya (later renamed as Kodiak). In 1793, he founded the port of Voskresenskii, modern-day Seward. In 1794, under the direction of a British sea captain working for the Russian-American Company (RAC) a sea-going sailing ship was built at Resurrection Bay. This was important for the colonies in fulfilling their transportation needs. Shortly after, a group of Russian Orthodox clergy arrived in Russian America. Their views were often at odds with Baranov's methods of management, especially of the native workers.

He founded a settlement in Yakutat Bay in 1795 for 30 serf farming families from Russia. By 1797, Baranov was two years overdue to be replaced, and he had no word of relief. That year, Baranov's Aleut mistress gave birth to their son, Antipatr. He had two more mixed-race Aleut-Russian children with his mistress, also giving them Russian names: Irina and Ekaterina. After learning that his wife in Russia had died, Baranov married the Aleut woman, legitimizing their children.

== Russian-American Company ==
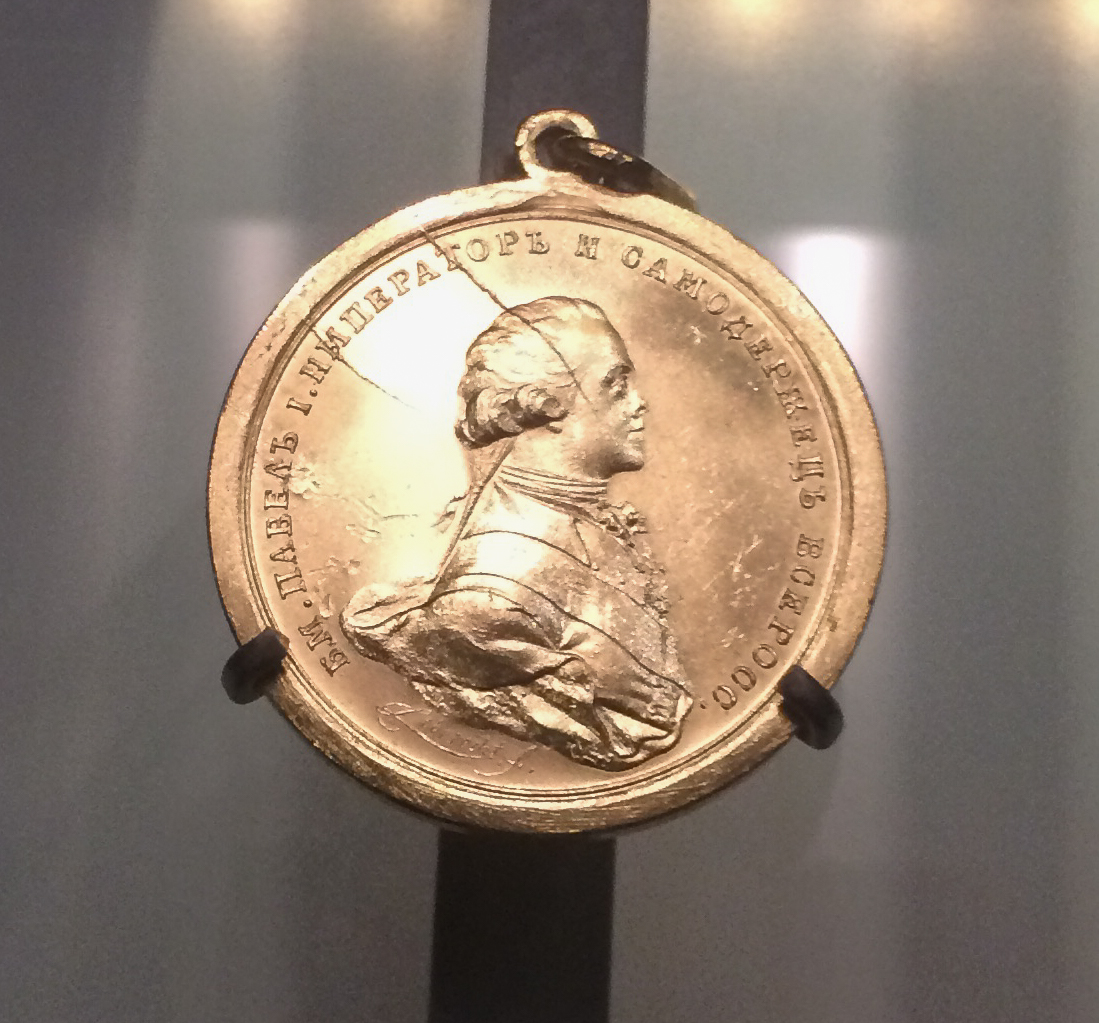
Medal presented to Baranov by Tsar Paul I in 1799

In Saint Petersburg, then capital of Russia, Nikolai Rezanov was a high official, Chamberlain to the Tsar. He was also Chairman of the RAC, successor of the Shelikhov Company, through which Russia occupied and ruled Alaska. Due to Rezanov's influence at the royal court, in 1799 Baranov was appointed as Chief Manager – to manage all of the RAC's interests in the field, including the Aleutian and Kuril Islands. However, due to the one-year travel time each way between St. Petersburg and Alaska, it was late 1800 before Baranov learned of his promotion and expanded responsibilities.

Communication with the government in St. Petersburg was so difficult that Baranov was left almost entirely on his own to decide any pressing issues. For all practical matters, he was the government of Alaska. In 1799, Baranov had decided that perceived British encroachment on Russia's holdings in southeastern Alaska required him to build a defensive fort in that area. While the Russians maintained that he bought a portion of land from the Tlingit and built a fort and settlement on Sitka Island overlooking Sitka Sound, the Tlingit believed that land could not be owned, therefore meaning that the land occupied by the Russians was never purchased. He believed it was important in order to ensure that the region remained under Russian instead of British control.

In 1802, after Baranov had returned to Kodiak to tend to matters there, the Tlingit tribe on Sitka Island decided to expel the Russians. The latter disregarded the Tlingit warnings to evacuate. Led by war chief Katlian (spelled Kot-le-an in Michener's Alaska), the Tlingit attacked and massacred nearly everyone at the Sitka settlement. Baranov responded by gathering naval forces and an army of about 700 Aleut warriors to attack Katlian's new fort on Sitka at Indian River. He intended to push the Tlingit off Sitka Island temporarily in order to build a new Russian fort at the most strategic site on Sitka Sound. This would be at a place that had been long occupied by the Tlingit, who also knew its strategic value.

To Baranov's great surprise and satisfaction, as he prepared for battle, a decree arrived from Tsar Alexander I promoting him to the rank of Collegiate Counselor—a rank in the middle of the Russian ranks of nobility. From the lowly class of mestchannin, far below nobility, he had been elevated to a rank equal or superior to the Imperial Russian Navy ship captains, who had treated him with condescension because of his low social rank.

=== Battle of Sitka ===
In September 1804, Baranov sailed into Sitka Sound with his forces, including the frigate Neva. Baranov met with Katlian and other Native chiefs and tried to negotiate a peaceful resolution, without success. Just before the Battle of Sitka began, most of the Tlingit gunpowder (acquired from the British and Americans) exploded. It was hit by Russian gunfire while being moved by Tlingit warriors in a war canoe to their main fort from storage on a small island. This loss greatly weakened the Tlingit defenses.

The Russian ground forces unsuccessfully launched a frontal attack on the Tlingit fort at Indian River. Thereafter, they concentrated on naval bombardment from the big guns of the frigate Neva. After several days, the Tlingit abandoned their fort and escaped in a "survival march" to the adjoining Chichagof Island to the north. Baranov immediately began construction of a new fort on top of a rock outcropping at the eastern edge of Sitka Sound. Food soon became scarce for the Russians. Baranov sent a 50-foot sailboat, under the command of his deputy Ivan Kuskov, the 2800 miles to Hawaii to get urgently needed food supplies from King Kamehameha, a long-time trading friend. Kuskov returned with the supplies in time to narrowly avert starvation of the Russians at Sitka.

=== Rezanov Inspection ===
In 1805, Tlingit warriors attacked and massacred the Russian settlement at Yakutat, which Baranov decided to abandon. Late that year, Nikolai Rezanov, the Tsar's Chamberlain and Chairman of the RAC, arrived in Russian America for an inspection trip. He had heard rumors that Baranov was mismanaging affairs. But Rezanov's resulting reports to the Tsar praised Baranov's management and attributed rumors against the governor to malcontents.

Baranov asked to be relieved of his position so that he could return to Russia and see his family there again. Believing Baranov to be indispensable to the RAC colonies, Rezanov avoided a definite answer.

The American maritime fur trader John DeWolf was at Sitka when Rezanov arrived. DeWolf, noting the difficulty the RAC had in acquiring decent ships, offered to sell his ship Juno to the RAC. Rezanov readily agreed.

In the spring of 1806, Rezanov sailed the Juno from Sitka to San Francisco in Spanish-held California to obtain urgently needed food supplies in exchange for otter furs. He also tried to establish an alliance with the Spanish against the United Kingdom and United States. During this visit with the Spanish of Northern California, he became enamored of María de la Concepción "Conchita" Argüello, the famously beautiful daughter of the commander of the Spanish garrison at San Francisco. They became engaged to be married, subject to religious approvals, as she was Roman Catholic and he was Russian Orthodox. Rezanov thought this potential match would be a boon to Russian/Spanish cooperation in North America.

He returned to Sitka with the needed food. From there, he sailed to Siberia to begin the thousands of miles of overland travel to St. Petersburg to seek the necessary religious approvals from Russian Orthodox clergy for his marriage. During the harsh winter trek on horseback across Siberia, Rezanov became ill and died. His great dream of a joint Russian-Spanish empire of the Pacific ended there.

=== Later years ===
In 1807 Baranov was awarded the Order of St. Anna, 2nd class for his successful perseverance and leadership. That year he received news that his Russian wife had died. Baranov married his Native mistress in the Russian Orthodox church and had their three children legitimized. Despite his success in reestablishing a solid presence at present-day Sitka, to which Baranov had moved the capital of Russian America from Kodiak, there was local opposition to his rule.

He wore a shirt of iron mail beneath his outer shirt to protect himself. The Tlingit made several unsuccessful attempts at assassination, and were amazed by his survival, not knowing of his armor. In 1810, Baranov was at risk of assassination by some of his own disgruntled Russian soldiers, but he was warned and the attempt was thwarted. Meanwhile, he learned that men who had been appointed by the RAC to relieve Baranov died en route to Alaska, to his great disappointment.

Activity in the region flourished as trading in sea otter and seal furs boomed. Baranov convinced Native hunters to expand their range to include the coasts of California. Baranov also advocated more educational opportunities for the Alaska Native Americans. Under his leadership, schools were created and frontier communities became less isolated. During Baranov's rule, Russian Orthodox missionaries operated widely in Russian America. They translated the Bible into Tlingit and other Native languages, performed the liturgy in those languages, and inoculated Natives against smallpox.

In 1812, Baranov established Fort Ross in California about 50 miles (80 km) north of San Francisco. It was intended to develop farm products to feed the Alaskan communities.

=== Schäffer affair ===
In 1815, Baranov sent Dr. Georg Schäffer, a physician, to Hawaii to establish a way station to accommodate Russian ships carrying furs from Alaska to the booming fur markets of Canton, China. Schaffer got involved with Hawaiian politics to the displeasure of King Kamahameha; he was forced to depart for China and leave the Russian forts on Kauaʻi abandoned. The Hawaiian project was Baranov's greatest failure, causing considerable expense to the RAC.

As a result of this failure, concern about Baranov's age (70), and allegations against him by navy officers returning from Alaska, the RAC Board of Directors decided to commission Russian Navy Capt. Lt. Ludwig von Hagemeister (also known as Leontij in Russian) to go to Alaska, investigate the charges against Baranov, and replace him as Chief Manager and governor. He did not reach Alaska until 1817, and replaced Baranov in early 1818.

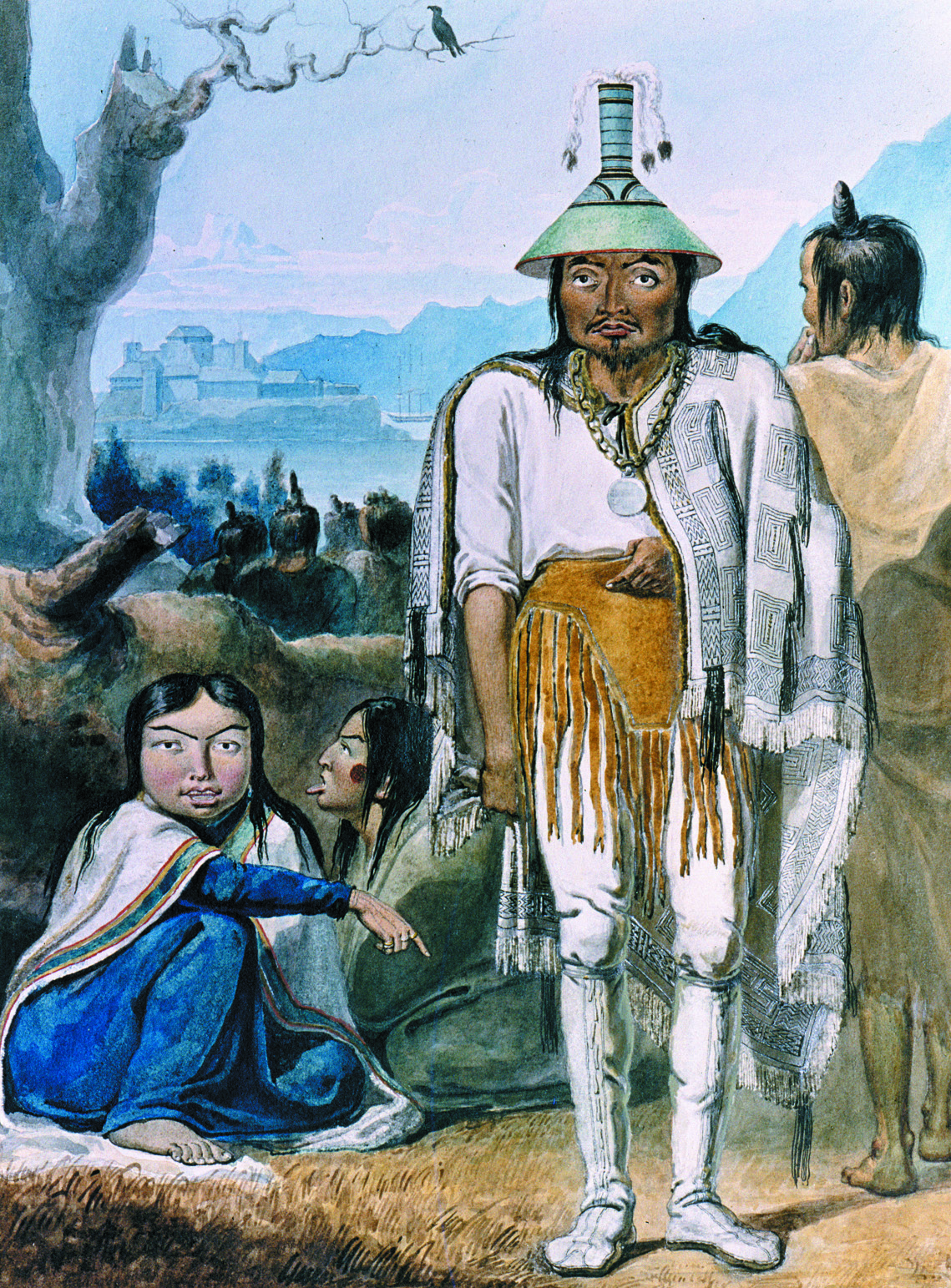
Sitka Island Chief Katlian With His Wife

=== Retirement and death ===
Hagemeister arrived at Sitka in November 1817 with an accountant, Kirill Khlebnikov (later Baranov's first biographer), to audit the financial records of Russian America for any evidence of Baranov's alleged wrongdoing. Hagemeister succeeded Baranov as Chief Manager and governor in January 1818. Khlebnikov was appointed Office Manager, receiving company capital totaling two and a half million rubles. Khlebnikov's audit showed that the books balanced to the ruble, with all income and disbursements accounted for. There was no evidence of malfeasance by Baranov. The audit showed that Baranov was personally almost insolvent because he had made it a practice to help others in financial distress with his own funds throughout his rule.

In late July 1818, a Russian Imperial Navy ship sailing around the world arrived in Sitka for a brief visit of less than a month. On board was Mikhail Tikhanov, a Navy artist assigned to document the voyage. In August 1818, Tikhanov painted an oil portrait of Baranov and a watercolor of Tlingit chief Katlian and his wife. These were the only likenesses ever made during their lifetimes of the two long-time antagonists who had finally made peace. It was painted when he was 71, six months before he died. In the Katlian painting, the chief is about age 45. He is shown with an "Allies of Russia" silver medal hanging on a light chain from his neck, and with Baranov's "Castle" fortress in the distance behind the chief. The two paintings together, by the same artist at the same time, offer a remarkable narrative on war and peace.

In October 1818, Hagemeister appointed his second-in-command Navy Lt. Semyon Yanovsky, by then husband of Irina Baranov and thus Baranov's son-in-law, to act as Chief Manager and governor. Yanovsky was replaced in 1820 with Matvey Muravyev who had been appointed directly by the Board of the RAC. On 27 November, Baranov and Hagemeister left Alaska together on the Navy ship Kutuzov for Russia. The ship headed south on a route that would take it west around the Cape of Good Hope at the foot of the African continent, to sail northward to St. Petersburg. En route, the ship made an extended stopover in March 1819 in the Dutch settlement of Batavia, on the island of Java, then part of the colonial Dutch East Indies (present day Indonesia). Baranov became ill there, and soon after the ship resumed its journey, he died on 16 April 1819. He was buried at sea in the Sunda Strait off Panaitan, never reaching his homeland or his family.

== Legacy ==
- Baranof Island in Alaska is named after Baranov.
- SS Alexander Baranof, a US Liberty ship, was named for Baranov.
- Statue of Alexander Andreyevich Baranov, Sitka, Alaska. Was removed from outdoor public display amidst controversy and a vote of the Sitka town council in 2020.
- The 1942 Baranof totem pole in Sitka, Alaska, depicts Baranov on top of the pole to commemorate a battle and subsequent peace treaty he made with a Tlingit clan; contrary to the wishes of the designer, Baranov was shown nude until 2011.

== See also ==
- Battle of Sitka
- Yuri Lisyansky
- Russian Fort Elizabeth, a fort in Hawaii constructed in 1817 by the Russian-American Company.
- Timofei Nikitich Tarakanov

== Notes ==
Government offices
Preceded by Evstratii Delarov	Chief Manager of the Shelikhov-Golikov Company; 1792—1799	Succeeded by himself as Governor of Russian Colonies in America
Preceded by new post replacing the Governor of United American Company	Governor of Russian Colonies in America; 1799—1818	Succeeded by Ludwig von Hagemeister
