= Tlingit clans =

Alaskan indigenous clan

The Tlingit clans of Southeast Alaska, in the United States, are one of the Indigenous cultures within Alaska. The Tlingit people also live in the Northwest Interior of British Columbia, Canada, and in the southern Yukon Territory. There are two main Tlingit lineages or moieties within Alaska, which are subdivided into a number of clans and houses.

== Tlingit moieties ==
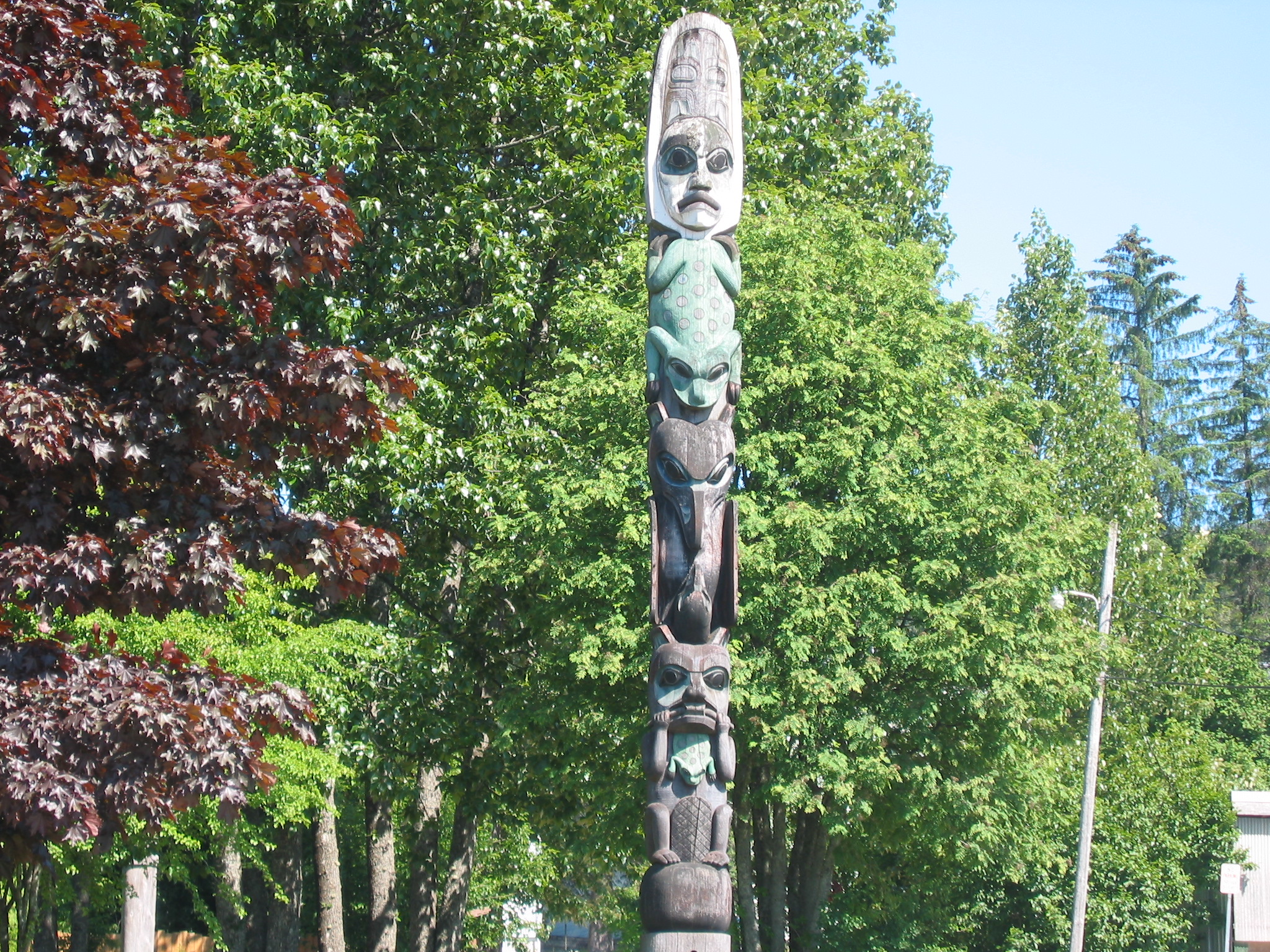
The Kiks.ádi totem pole in Wrangell, Alaska.

The Tlingit people of Southeast Alaska have multiple moieties (otherwise known as descent groups) in their society, each of which is divided into a number of clans. Each clan has its own history, songs, and totems, and each forms a social network of extended families which functions as a political unit in Tlingit society.

The moieties of the Tlingit society are the Raven (Yéil) and Eagle, Wolf, killer whale, Frog, Thunderbird and hummingbird and butterfly. The similarity to moiety names are because its primary crests differ between the north and the south regions of Tlingit territory, probably due to influence from the neighboring tribes of Haida, Tsimshian and Nisga'a. Each moiety is further subdivided into clans, and each clan is subdivided into houses.

== Clan names, crests and political structure ==
The Tlingit clans have names whose meaning typically reflects the foundation story of the clan. The clans are usually referred to in English by the name of their primary crest, and example being Deisheetaan can also be referred to as simply "Beaver Clan" or "Raven Beaver". This is not a hard rule however, since some crests may be held by multiple clans. Clans of opposite moieties occasionally claim the same crest, but such irregular ownership is usually due to a debt owed by some other clan; until the debt is paid, the clan holding the debt claims the crest of the clan which owes the debt, as a means of shaming it.

Clan allegiance is governed through a matrilineal system; meaning children are part of their mother's clan at birth and gain their status within her family. This includes what was traditionally hereditary leadership positions. While fathers may have deep influence over their children's upbringing, historically they are from an opposing clan to the mother and traditionally play a lesser role in rearing than the mother's brothers and other family do. Traditionally procreation and courtship are between from members from differing clans under opposite moieties. It was considered societal faux pas for two Ravens or two Eagles to be in a relationship with one another because others in your moiety are considered to be of the same family. Dating or copulating within your own moiety could be considered akin to incest. While these norms are still prevalent in modern Tlingit society, they are much less rigid. Depending on your genetic family structure opposing clans can be direct first biological cousins in many cases.

Not all clans listed below are extant; some have been absorbed into other clans; others have died out due to the lack of female descendants, and a few have been lost to history. Not all the clans are independent, since clans formed in a long and fluid process. For instance, the Kak'weidí descend from the Deisheetaan. Some members claim that they are a "house" within the Deisheetaan clan; others claim that they are a small but fully independent clan.

== List of clans ==
In the list below the Tlingit name of the clan is given with its primary crest in parentheses, followed by the various kwáan (region or village) in which they are found. Known houses are listed beneath each clan.

=== Clans of the Raven moiety (Yéil naa) ===
- Gaanax.ádi — Galyáx, Xunaa, T'aaku, Aak'w, S'awdáan, Takjik'aan, Taant'a
- Táakw.aaneidí
- L'uknax.ádi (Coho salmon)
- Gaanaxteidee (hibernation frog/strong man/wood worm)
- T'éex'.ádi
- Ishkeetaan/Ishkahítaan (Ganaxteidee) (Hibernation Frog) same as Ganaxteidee (di)
- X'at'ka.aayí
- Koosk'eidí/Xaas híttaan
- X'alchaneidí
- Kiks.ádi (Frog/Herring, Rock)
- Teeyhíttaan
- Teeyineidí
- Deisheetaan (BEAVER also use of Dragonfly) —
- Aanx'aakíttaan/Aanx'aak híttaan
- L'eeneidí (Dog Salmon)
- T'akdeintaan (Sea Pigeon/Tern)
- L'ukwaax.ádi
- Noowshaka.aayí
- Kwáashk'ikwáan/Kwáashk' Kwáan
- Weix'hineidí
- Yéeskaneidí
- L'ookwhineidí
- Kuyeidí
- Téel' híttaan
- Sakwteeneidí/Sukwteeneidí
- Kijookw híttaan/Gijookw híttaan
- Taneidí
- Kookw híttaan
- Kayaa.ádi
- Tukwyeidí/Tukwweidí
- Kaasx'agweidí
- Taalkweidí
- Kuyéik'.ádi
- HeHL -non Tlinget Indigenous Peoples (Raven Moieties- Bear/Badger/Wolf/Sea Monster)

=== Clans of the Eagle/Wolf moiety (Ch'aak'/Gooch naa) ===
- Kaagwaantaan (Wolf)
- Yanyeidí
- Lkweidi
- Teikweidí (Brown Bear)
- Dagisdinaa
- Jishkweidí
- Dakl'aweidí -(House/Killer Whale Clan/Wolf Clan)
- Shangukeidí - (Thunderbird)
- Wooshkeetaan - (Shark)
- Chookaneidí - (Glacier Bear)
- Kadakw.ádi
- Tsaateeneidí
- S'eet'kweidí
- Kookhittaan - (Bear)
  - Kóok Hít | Box House
- Tsaagweidí - (Killer Whale)
- Nees.ídi
- Was'ineidí - (Auklet) BEAR Kéex' Kwáan
  - Tax' Hít | Teir/Platform/Bench House
- Naasteidí
- Kayaashkeiditaan
- Naanyaa.aayí (House/Killer Whale Clan/Wolf)
- Sik'nax.ádi
- Xook'eidí
- Kaax'oos.hittaan
- Neix.ádi (Eagle/Beaver/Halibut)

== See also ==
- Ganhada
- Laxgibuu
- History of the Tlingit
