= Robert Lewis =

Robert Lewis may refer to:

== Film and television ==
- Robert Lewis (director) (1909–1997), American actor, director and founder of the Actors Studio
- Robert Q. Lewis (1920–1991), radio and TV personality
- Robert Lloyd Lewis (active since 2006), American television and film producer
- Robbie Lewis, fictional character in Morse
- Rob Lewis (Neighbours), fictional character in Neighbours

== Music ==
- Bobby Lewis (1925–2020), American rock and roll and R&B singer
- Robert Hall Lewis (1926–1996), American trumpeter, composer, conductor
- Bobby Lewis (country singer) (born 1942), American country music singer-songwriter
- Bob Lewis (musician) (born 1947), founder and member of Devo
- Rob Lewis (music director) (born 1976), American music arranger and musical director
- Rob Lewis (hip-hop producer) (active since 1982), American record producer
- Rob Lewis (composer) (born 1982), English composer, producer and multi-instrumentalist

== Politics ==
- Robert Lewis (MP) (died 1561), British politician, member of parliament for Canterbury
- Robert Lewis (died 1649), MP for Reigate
- Robert Jacob Lewis (1864–1933), American politician from Pennsylvania
- Robert Kennedy Lewis, St Lucian politician
- Robert S. Lewis (1856–1956), American politician from North Dakota
- Robert W. Lewis (born 1951), American politician from Vermont
- Bob Lewis (Washington politician) (1925–2015), American politician from state of Washington
- Bob Lewis (Kansas politician), American politician from Kansas
- B. Robert Lewis (1931–1979), American veterinarian and politician in the Minnesota Senate
- Robert D. Lewis (1931–2019), American politician in the New Hampshire House of Representatives
- Robert R. Lewis (1880–1961), American jurist

== Sports ==
- Bob Lewis (basketball, born 1925) (1925–2012), American basketball player, played for the Utah Utes
- Bob Lewis (golfer) (born 1944–2021), American golfer
- Bobby Lewis (baseball) (1929–1995), American baseball coach
- Bobby Lewis (basketball, born 1945), American basketball player, played for the North Carolina Tar Heels
- Bobby Lewis (basketball, born 1946) (1946–2024), American basketball player
- Robert B. Lewis (1924–2006), racehorse owner
- Dale Lewis (ice hockey) (Robert Dale Lewis, born 1952), Canadian ice hockey player
- Robert Lewis (rugby union) (born 1987), Welsh rugby union player
- Robert Lewis (jockey) (1878–1947), Australian jockey

== Other ==
- Rob Lewis (entrepreneur) (born 1969), English entrepreneur and executive chairman of Omnifone
- Rob Lewis (marine scientist), director of SARDI
- Robert A. Lewis (1917–1983), United States Air Force officer, co-pilot of the Enola Gay
- Robert E. Lewis (1857–1941), United States federal judge
- Robert Lewis (lynching victim) (died 1892), American lynched in Port Jervis, NY
- Robert F. R. Lewis (1826–1881), United States Navy officer
- Robert Benjamin Lewis (1802–1858), African and Native American author and entrepreneur
- Robert Patrick Lewis, former Green Beret and 1st Amendment Praetorian co-founder
- Robert G. Lewis (1916–2011), American photographer, editor and author in the field of railways
- Robert Lewis (journalist) (born 1943), Canadian journalist, author and media executive

== See also ==
- Bert Lewis (disambiguation)
- Robert Louis (disambiguation)
