= Lewis Allen =

Lewis Allen or Allan may refer to:

- Lewis Allen (rugby union) (1870–1932), New Zealand rugby union player
- Lewis Allen (director) (1905–2000), film and television director
- Lewis F. Allen (1800–1890), American politician and land developer
- Lewis M. Allen (1922–2003), American film producer
- Lewis Allan, sometimes Allen, pseudonym of Abel Meeropol (1903–1986), American lyricist
- Lewis Allan (footballer) (born 1996), Scottish footballer

== See also ==
- Frederick Lewis Allen (1890–1954), American editor and historian
- Lew Allen (1925–2010), United States Air Force general
- Alan Lewis (disambiguation)
- Allen Lewis (disambiguation)
- Allan Lewis (disambiguation)
- Alun Lewis (disambiguation)
