= Al Lewis (disambiguation) =

Al Lewis (1923–2006) was an American character actor.

Al Lewis may also refer to:

- Al Lewis (lyricist) (1901–1967), American songwriter
- Al Lewis (banjoist) (1902–1992), American jazz banjoist
- Al Lewis (1924–2009), American host of The Uncle Al Show
- Al Lewis (columnist), American journalist
- Al Lewis (singer-songwriter) (born 1984), Welsh singer and songwriter

== See also ==
- Alan Lewis (disambiguation)
- Albert Lewis (disambiguation)
- Alfred Lewis (disambiguation)
- Allan Lewis (disambiguation)
- Allen Lewis (disambiguation)
- Alun Lewis (disambiguation)
- Alvin Lewis (disambiguation)
