= Charles F. Newcombe =

British botanist and ethnographic researcher

- Born: 15 September 1851; Newcastle upon Tyne
- Died: 19 October 1924 (aged 73); Victoria, British Columbia
- Education: University of Aberdeen (MD 1878)
- Known for: Collection of totem poles, study of Haida culture
- Scientific career
- Fields: Medicine, botany, ethnography
- Institutions: Lake District, England; Hood River, Oregon; "Insane Asylum" in New Westminster, British Columbia
- Author abbrev. (botany): C.F.Newc.

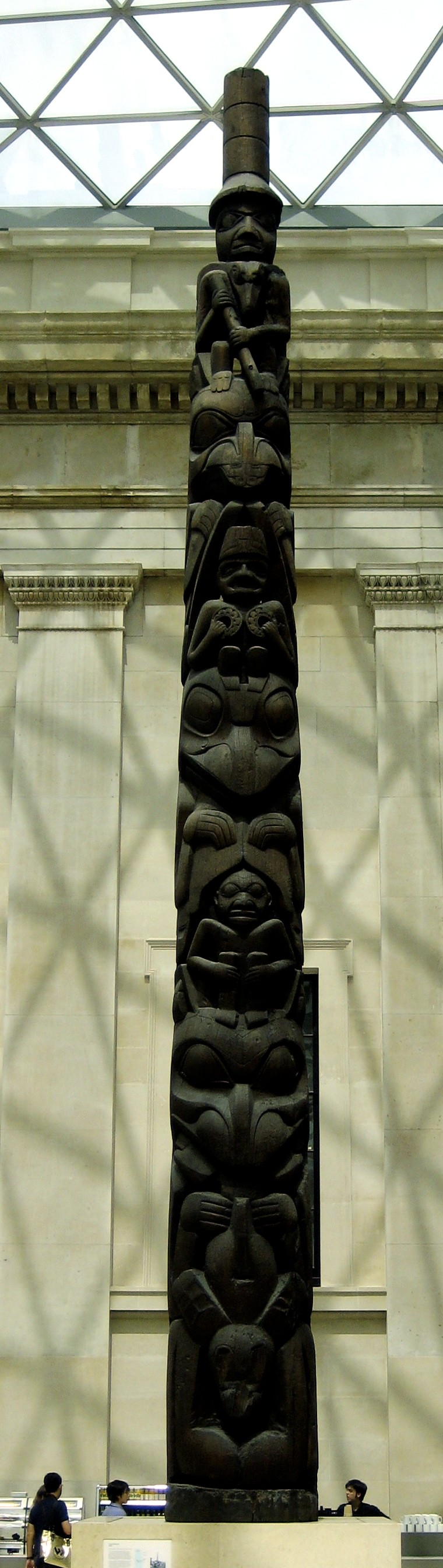
This totem pole was bought by the British Museum from Newcombe in 1903.

Charles Frederick Newcombe (15 September 1851 – 19 October 1924) was a British botanist and ethnographic researcher. He is known for his studies of the First Nations or native people of Canada. The standard author abbreviation C.F.Newc. is used to indicate this person as the author when citing a botanical name.

== Biography ==
Newcombe was born in Newcastle upon Tyne, England, as the eighth of fourteen children. His parents were William Lister Newcombe (1817–1908) and Eliza Jane (Rymer) (1816–1888), who were both from Yorkshire.

Newcombe received his MB from the University of Aberdeen in 1873 and his MD in 1878. He married Marian Arnold (1857–1891) in 1879. For a number of years he was in general practice in the Lake District.

In 1884, Newcombe emigrated to the United States, establishing a general practice in Hood River, Oregon. He moved in 1885 with his family to Victoria, British Columbia. In 1889, he moved back to Victoria and worked at the "Insane Asylum" in New Westminster. His wife Marian died after the birth of their sixth child in 1891, leaving him with two daughters and four sons.

With his eldest three children, he returned to England and participated in geological and natural history studies at the British Museum and the University of London. He ceased to practice medicine after 1894.

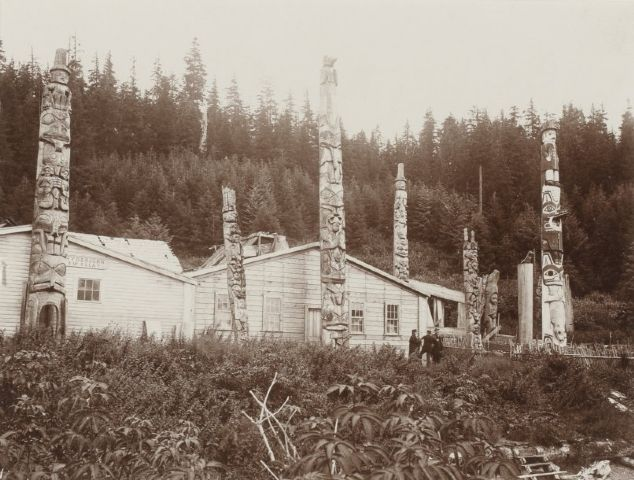
An albumen print by Newcombe taken in 1901

Newcombe began to study the botany of North America and made many trips to Haida Gwaii (formerly the Queen Charlotte Islands) by boat. In the process he became very interested in the Haida and started to collect their artifacts to "preserve" them from, what was then thought to be, the impending demise of the native culture. Newcombe and others were driven by the "fear that 'pure' Northwest Coast cultures were disappearing through depopulation and assimilation".

In 1897, George Amos Dorsey traveled with him in an effort to collect Haida artifacts for the Field Columbian Museum in Chicago. Dorsey, an American, was known for his haste in his collecting. Dorsey asked Scottish guide James Deans to keep quiet about their activities in the area. Local missionary John Henry Keen lambasted Deans and his unidentified American collaborators for disrupting and desecrating the graves of the local natives in their hunt for Northwest Coast artifacts.

Newcombe acquired many totem poles for the Royal British Columbia Museum, the Pitt Rivers Museum in Oxford, the British Museum, Kew Gardens, and museums in Cambridge, Liverpool and Sydney. Between 1897 and 1924, he bought at least 67 totem poles, over thirty of which were Haida. In 1904, he went with six Vancouver Island First Nations people and their medicine man to the World's Fair held in St. Louis to show their crafts and culture.

Newcombe also conducted biological and geographic research, such as on local (British Columbia) mollusks and paleontology. In 1913, he led a Commission studying the effect of sea lions on the salmon industry. In 1914, he prepared a report on the circumnavigation of Vancouver Island. Much of his work, including collection of plants, mollusks, fossils, aboriginal artifacts and information, was done with the help of his youngest surviving son, William Henry Arnold Newcombe (1884–1960).

Newcombe died in 1924 in Victoria, British Columbia, after catching a cold (more likely pneumonia) on a sailing expedition.

== See also ==
- Nisga'a and Haida Crest Poles of the Royal Ontario Museum
