= Arrears =

Part of a debt which is overdue after missing payments

In finance, arrears (or arrearage) is a legal term for the part of a debt that is overdue after missing one or more required payments. The amount of the arrears is the amount accrued from the date on which the first missed payment was due. The term is usually used in relation with periodically-recurring payments such as rent, bills, royalties (or other contractual payments), and child support.

Payment in arrear is a payment made after a service has been provided, as distinct from in advance, which are payments made at the start of a period. For instance, rent is usually paid in advance, but mortgages in arrear (the interest for the period is due at the end of the period). Employees' salaries are usually paid in arrear. Payment at the end of a period is referred to by the singular arrear, to distinguish from past due payments. For example, a housing tenant who is obliged to pay rent at the end of each month is said to pay rent in arrear, while a tenant who has not paid rental due for 30 days is said to be one month in arrears. Precise usage may differ slightly (e.g. "in arrear" or "in arrears" for the same situation) in different countries.

== Accounting ==
In accounting, arrears is used in at least three different ways.

=== Calls in arrears ===
This is when any shareholder does not pay their call money to a company on their due date. At that time, the company will deduct that calls in arrears from total called up capital for showing net paid up capital in balance sheet.

=== Dividends in arrears ===
The word arrears is used to mean "past due" when describing the past, omitted dividends on cumulative preferred stock. If a corporation fails to declare the preferred dividend, those dividends are said to be in arrears. The dividends in arrears must be disclosed in the notes (footnotes) to the financial statements. (Cumulative preferred stock requires that any past, omitted dividends must be paid to the preferred stockholders before the common stockholders will be paid any dividend.)

=== Annuities in arrears ===
The word arrears means "end of period" when referring to annuities (an annuity is a series of equal amounts occurring at equal time intervals, such as £1,000 per month for 20 years). If the recurring amount comes at the end of each period, the annuity is described as an annuity in arrears or as an ordinary annuity. A loan repayment schedule is usually an annuity in arrears. For example, you borrow £10,000 on September 30 and your first monthly payment will be due on October 31, the second payment will be due on November 30, and so on.

== Derivatives ==
An in-arrears swap is an interest rate swap that sets (fixes) the interest rate and pays the interest at the end of the coupon period. In contrast, a standard swap sets the interest rate in advance, at the beginning of the coupon period, and pays the interest in arrears, at the end of the coupon period. The same distinction holds for other interest rate derivatives, e.g. caps, floors and swaptions.
