= Bert Lewis (disambiguation) =

Bert Lewis (1895–1950) was a baseball pitcher.

Bert or Bertie Lewis may also refer to:

- Bert Lewis of Chair Entertainment
- Bert Lewis (musician) on Steamboat Willie in 1928
- Bert Lewis, character in list of Secret Army episodes in 1977–1979
- Bertie Lewis (1920–2010), British airman and peace campaigner
- Bertie Lewis (priest) (1931–2006), Welsh clergyman

== See also ==
- Albert Lewis (disambiguation)
- Robert Lewis (disambiguation)
- Herbert Lewis (disambiguation)
- Hubert Lewis (disambiguation)
