= Alvin Lewis =

Alvin Lewis may refer to:

- Alvin Lewis (Florida State University), president, between 1892 and 1897, of the Seminary West of the Suwannee River, now Florida State University
- Alvin Lewis (boxer) (1942–2018)

== See also ==
- Al Lewis (disambiguation)
