= George Amos Dorsey =

American ethnographer

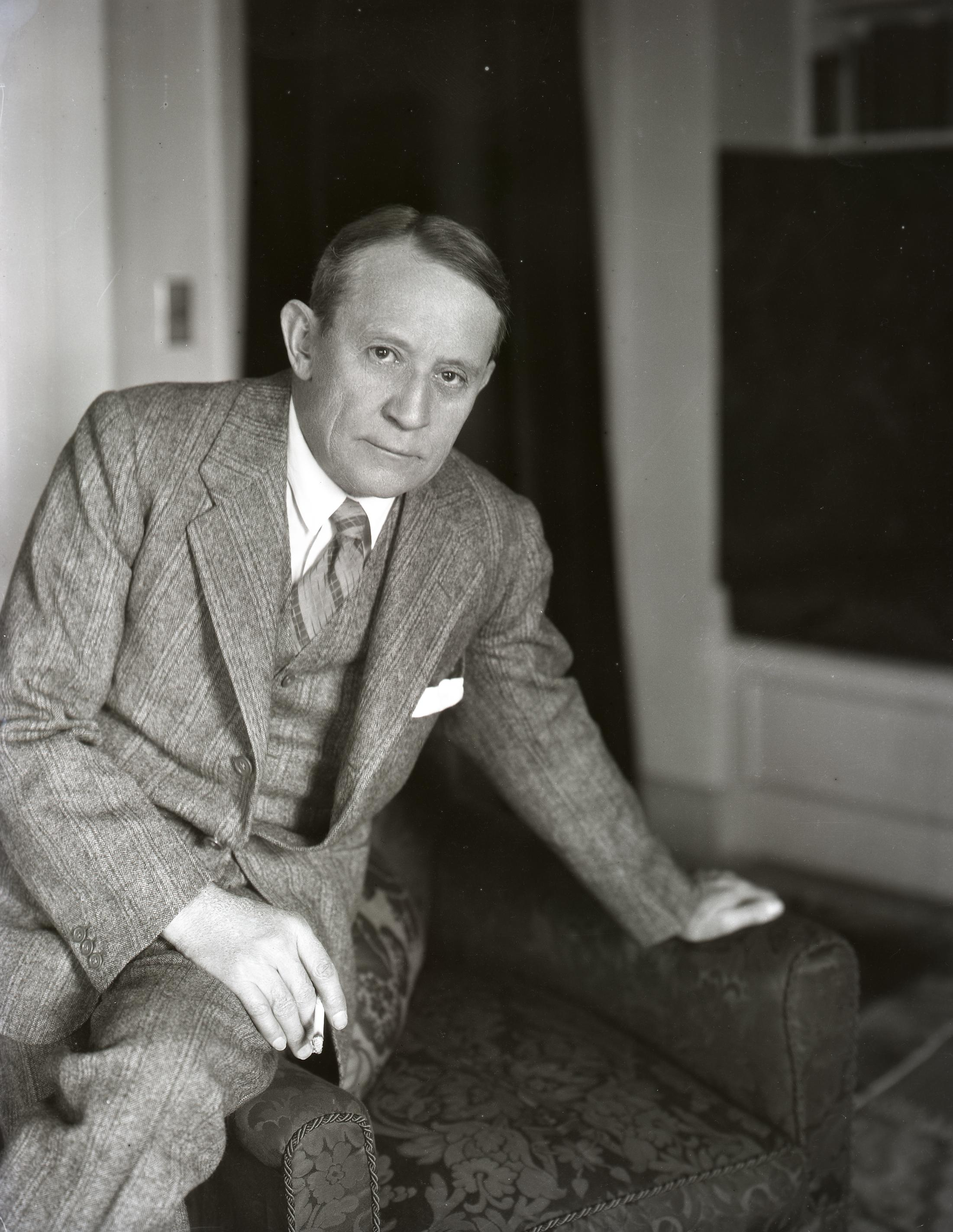
- Portrait by Jessie Tarbox Beals
- Born: February 6, 1868; Hebron, Ohio
- Died: March 29, 1931 (aged 63); New York City
- Children: Dorothy Ann Dorsey, George Chadsey Dorsey
- Parent(s): Edwin Jackson and Mary Emma (nee Grove) Dorsey

George Amos Dorsey (February 6, 1868 – March 29, 1931) was an American ethnographer of indigenous peoples of the Americas, with a special focus on the Caddoan and Siouan tribes of the Great Plains. He is credited with helping develop the anthropology of the Plains Indian tribes while serving as curator at the Field Museum in Chicago from 1898 until 1915. During this period, he also was Professor of Anthropology at the University of Chicago from 1907 to 1915.

In 1897 Dorsey was one of the first anthropologists to appear as an expert forensic witness when examined what he proved were human remains and testified in the murder trial of Adolph Luetgert in Chicago. In 1925, his cultural study, Why We Behave Like Human Beings, became an unexpected bestseller. This inspired the reissue of his 1917 novel, and enabled him to publish several more books on anthropology and culture. One book in preparation at the time of his death in 1931 was published posthumously.

== Early life and education ==
Dorsey was born in Hebron, Ohio, to Edwin Jackson and Mary Emma (nee Grove) Dorsey. He attended local schools before college.

He received a Bachelor of Arts degree from Denison University in 1888, then a second bachelor's degree in anthropology in 1890 at Harvard University. He was awarded his PhD in 1894, based on his dissertation, An Archaeological Study Based on a Personal Exploration of Over One Hundred Graves at the Necropolis of Ancon, Peru. This was the first PhD in anthropology to be awarded by Harvard, and the second awarded in the United States.

== Career ==
Based on his work in Peru in 1892, Dorsey became head of the archaeological branch of the department of anthropology at Harvard, serving until 1896. In 1897 he joined the staff of the Field Museum of Natural History in Chicago. as assistant curator. He was promoted to curator in 1898 and served until 1915. From 1907 to 1915 he also was Professor of Anthropology at the University of Chicago.

In the 1890s Dorsey had travelled with Anglo-Canadian botanist and ethnographer Charles Frederick Newcombe and Scottish guide James Deans in Northwest Canada to gather Haida artefacts that might be of ethnographic interest. Their methods varied, but they frequently held little regard for the sensibilities of the First Nations, or native Canadians. The local missionary, John Henry Keen took them to task after learning that they had raided graves and failed to restore them to their former state. Keen found hair and coffins strewn about from where the men had dug to steal skulls and bones. Keen published a letter in the Daily Colonist complaining about the desecration and challenged Deans to name his accomplices. He knew that the benefactor of their work was the Field Columbian Museum in Chicago and that the perpetrators were Americans. George Dorsey was known for his haste to acquire artefacts. When told of Keen's letter to the Daily Colonist, he argued that Keen's anger should be ignored.

In the early 1900s he acquired for the museum a large number of objects from curio dealers J. F. G. Umlauff of Hamburg and W. D. Webster, and subsequently expanded the museum's ethnographic holdings with his own trip to New Guinea, the Bismarck Archipelago, the Solomon Islands, and Australia. The trip led to his sending Albert Buell Lewis on major expedition to the South Pacific.

During the Great War (World War I), Dorsey was commissioned as a lieutenant in the Naval Reserve. In the later part of 1918 he was appointed as assistant naval attache at Madrid, and in 1919-21 naval attache at Lisbon. He was an adviser on Spanish problems to the American Commission to Negotiation Peace at Paris.

In addition to his formal studies of early societies for anthropology, Dorsey became involved in studying the waves of emigration from "Italy, Austria, Hungary, Rumania, Serbia and Bulgaria, and had studied political conditions in India, China, Japan, Australia and South Africa. He had been a delegate to international congresses of anthropology, and was a member of the Jury of Awards in this field for the St. Louis Exposition in 1904."

After his book Why We Behave Like Human Beings (1925) became a bestseller, Dorsey wrote and published several other general interest books on anthropology and culture. His 1917 novel was reissued in 1927.

Dorsey had achieved some early media notoriety in 1897 and 1898 when he was called to aid the investigation of the murder of Louisa Luetgert in Chicago. He was one of the first anthropologists called to testify as an expert forensic witness in a murder case; he had identified four tiny fragments of bone as human and helped gain the arrest and conviction of Adolph Luetgert for the sensational murder of his wife in 1897. The murder case received national coverage from newspapers. Luetgert was convicted of the murder in his second trial.

== Marriage and family ==
Dorsey married Ida Chadsey on December 8, 1892, while completing his PhD. They had two children together: Dorothy Ann and George Chadsey Dorsey. They separated in April 1914, and were subsequently divorced. Their daughter married and their son became a manager at Marshall Field & Company in Chicago. Ida Chadsey Dorsey died in 1937.

Dorsey married Sue McLellan after his divorce.

He died suddenly in 1931 of an embolism at his home in New York City, shortly before he was to give a radio talk and his book On Civilization was published.

== Legacy and honors ==
- Awarded Doctor of Laws in 1909 by Denison University

== Works ==
- Dorsey, George (1891). World's Columbian Exposition Expedition to Southern Ohio. Field Museum of Natural History.
- The Oraibi Soyal ceremony at the Internet Archive (1901)
- Indians of the Southwest at the Internet Archive (1903)
- The Arapaho Sun Dance : The Ceremony of the Offerings Lodge at the Internet Archive (1903)
- Traditions of the Arikara (1904)
- The Cheyenne: I. Ceremonial Organization at the Internet Archive (March 1905)
- The Cheyenne: II. The Sun Dance at the Internet Archive (May 1905)
- Young Low, a novel (1917)
- Why We Behave Like Human Beings (1925)
- The Nature of Man (1927)
- The Evolution of Charles Darwin (1927)
- Race and Civilization (1928)
- Hows and Whys of Human Behavior (1929)
- On Civilization (1931, posthumously)

Many more of his works are available at the Internet Archive.
