= Panic of 1896 =

Financial crisis in the United States

The Panic of 1896 was an acute economic depression in the United States that was less serious than other panics of the era, precipitated by a drop in silver reserves, and market concerns on the effects it would have on the gold standard. Deflation of commodities' prices drove the stock market to new lows in a trend that began to reverse only after the 1896 Klondike Gold Rush. During the panic, call money would reach 125 percent, the highest level since the Civil War.

== Causes ==
The Panic of 1896 had roots in the Panic of 1893, and is seen as a continuation of that economic depression. The drop in American gold reserves worsened the effects of the Panic of 1893, and the Panic of 1896 was given its own distinction. The Coinage Act of 1873 demonetized the use of silver in America, and the Resumption Act of 1875 further established the gold standard. This period of deflation was met with some resistance, as the agrarian Populist Party formed to protest the adoption of the gold standard, and reinstate the bimetallic standard, due to farmers’ inability to repay debts at lower prices, and silver miners loss of market share. Farmers also wanted to adopt the bimetallic standard because they could sell their crops at higher prices. The Sherman Silver Purchase of 1890 allowed limited use of silver in the American economy, but did not allow unlimited coinage as supporters of the "Free Silver" movement wanted. The Silver Purchase did not work as most of the backers had intended, as a large portion of the buyers redeemed their coins with gold, causing the already pressured American gold reserves to deplete. The American gold reserves dropped to just $60 million in January 1895, which, combined with the subsequent J. P. Morgan bond episode, in which Morgan, in cooperation with the European Rothschilds, sold gold directly to the U.S. treasury, causing the public’s worry for the gold standard to increase.

== Election of 1896 ==
=== William Jennings Bryan ===
Democratic and Populist party candidate William Jennings Bryan ran on the platform of "free silver", in which he implored Americans to drop the gold standard and reinstate the coinage of silver in order to inflate the American economy. Bryan was an orator who gave many speeches on the issue, the most famous being his "Cross of Gold" speech of July 9, 1896. In this speech, Bryan laid out his belief that the existence of multiple forms of legal tender was necessary for the health of the national economy, as farmers would benefit from being able to sell their crops at a higher price. Bryan became both the Democratic and the Populist party nominee, due in part to his stances on the issues of the gold standard, which he believed could alleviate the Panic of 1896. Bryan was a dark-horse candidate prior to his Cross of Gold speech, but his intense rhetoric resonated among many Americans who felt that a second, less valuable, form of legal tender was necessary for less wealthy Americans, and he quickly became the front-runner of the Populist and Democratic parties.

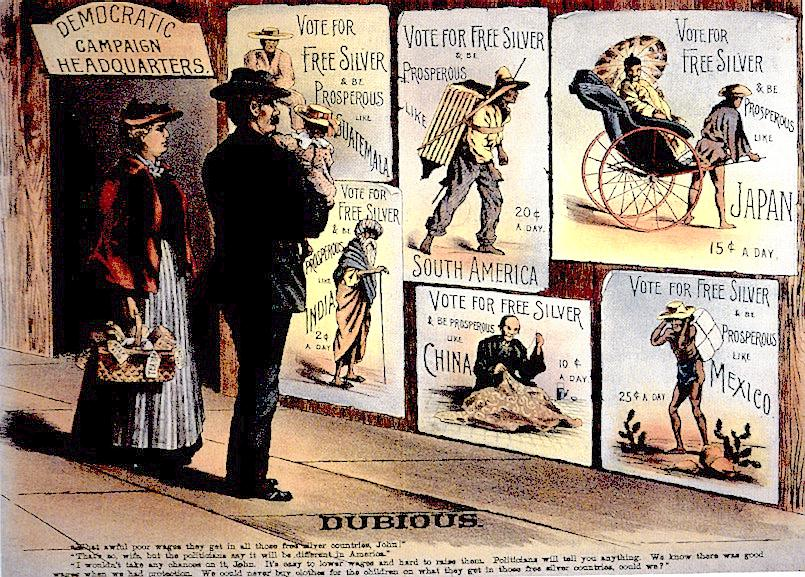
Republican campaign poster from 1896 attacking free silver.

=== William McKinley ===
Republican Party candidate William McKinley wished to remain on the Gold standard, unlike his opponent, Bryan. Many bankers and businessmen were disturbed by Bryan's silver rhetoric, and McKinley was able to win the election. McKinley kept the United States on the gold standard by signing the Gold Standard Act in 1900, lessening the strength of both the bimetallism movement and public fears about the Gold standard by his successful navigation out of the Panic of 1896, as the economy recovered by 1900. The Gold Standard Act formally adopted gold as the lone standard for redeeming paper money in the United States, effectively stopping bimetallism in its tracks.

== Effects ==
The economic hard times caused debates over whether America should remain on the gold standard or use a bimetallic standard. The continued economic hardships after the Panic of 1893 and the 1895 Morgan Bonds episode into the Panic of 1896 increased American worry about the strength of the American economy. Many members of the Populist Party took the Jewish ancestry of the Rothschilds as a negative and a wave of antisemitism emerged within the party. During the Panic, the national unemployment rate increased from 13.7% in 1895 to 14.5% in 1896, which persisted until 1898. A series of high-profile banker suicides took place in December 1896 and January 1897 in Chicago in the wake of the failure of the National Bank of Illinois along with the Adolph Luetgert murder case.

== See also ==
- Stock market crash
