= Albert Lewis =

Albert Lewis may refer to:

- Albert Lewis (American football) (born 1960), American football player
- Albert Lewis (producer) (1884–1978), Broadway producer
- Albert B. Lewis (1925–2021), New York politician
- Albert Gerald Lewis (1918–1982), World War II Royal Air Force pilot
- Albert L. Lewis (1917–2008), American rabbi
- Albert Buell Lewis (1867–1940), American anthropologist
- Albert Lewis (priest) (1921–2008), Welsh Anglican priest
- Albert Lewis (footballer) (c. 1884 –?), English footballer
- Talbot Lewis (Albert Edward Lewis, 1877–1956), English cricketer and footballer

== See also ==
- Al Lewis (disambiguation)
- Bert Lewis (disambiguation)
