= Hubert Lewis =

Hubert Lewis may refer to:

- Bertie Lewis (1920–2010), World War II RAF airman and peace campaigner
- Hubert Lewis (jurist) (1825–1884), British barrister and jurist
- Hubert William Lewis (1896–1977), Welsh recipient of the Victoria Cross

== See also ==
- Bert Lewis (disambiguation)
