= Adolph Luetgert =

German-American murderer (1845–1899)

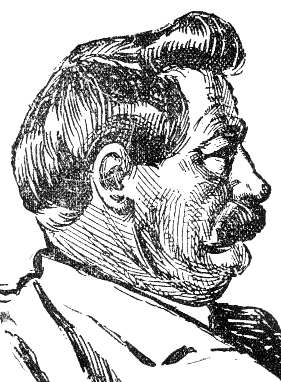
- Luetgert, depicted in 1897
- Born: Adolph Ludwig Lütgert; December 27, 1845; Gütersloh, Westphalia
- Died: July 7, 1899 (aged 53); Illinois State Penitentiary, Joliet, Illinois
- Resting place: Forest Home Cemetery, Forest Park, Illinois
- Occupation: Businessman
- Spouses: Caroline Roepke (1872-1877); Louisa Bicknese (1878-1897)
- Conviction: Murder
- Penalty: Life imprisonment

Details
- Location: Chicago

Adolph Louis Luetgert (December 27, 1845 – July 7, 1899) was a German-American businessman in Chicago, Illinois, convicted of murdering his second wife Louisa Bicknese in 1897 and dissolving her body in a sausage vat filled with lye at his A. L. Luetgert Sausage & Packing Company.

Luetgert, born in Gütersloh, Westphalia (now Germany), moved to Chicago in the 1870s. He married Louisa Bicknese on January 18, 1878, some months after his first wife died. They had four children together. Luetgert had founded his own business, the successful A. L. Luetgert Sausage & Packing Company, and was considered the "sausage king" of Chicago.

Prosecuted by State's Attorney Charles S. Deneen, later a two-term governor of Illinois, Luetgert was convicted and sentenced to life in prison on February 9, 1898. He died in prison a year and a half later.

After the trial was publicized, rumors spread that Luetgert had ground up his wife's remains as sausage and sold this "sausage" to unknowing consumers. Sales of sausage in Chicago dropped off for a while. The tale was later proved false, as her body was shown to have been dissolved and the remains mostly burned, but the legend persists to this day. Another common legend related to the murder is that the ghost of Louisa Luetgert haunts the old factory grounds and the couple's former home in Chicago.

== Early life ==
Adolph Louis Luetgert, born on December 27, 1845, was originally named Adolph Ludwig Lütgert. He was born in Gütersloh, located in the province of Westphalia, which is now a part of Germany. His parents, Christian Heinrich Lütgert and Margreta Sophia Severin, had a total of sixteen children; twelve other sons and two daughters. Adolph was the fourth born in the family. He had a twin brother named Heinrich Friedrich "Fritz" Luetgert, who died in 1894 or 1895. While Adolph Luetgert and his twin were growing up, their father dealt with animal hides and tallow wool, as well as dabbling in real estate.

Luetgert's schooling lasted from about the age of seven until the age of fourteen, as was typical of the time for tradesmen's sons. He worked as an apprentice under Ferdinand Knabel, who taught him the tanning business. During his apprenticeship, Luetgert continued to live in Westphalia, and lived with his boss instead of his family. After working for Knabel for two and a half years, Luetgert began to travel around Germany, working wherever he could. At the age of nineteen, Luetgert traveled to London, England, where he stayed for about six months. He left because he was unable to find a job other than scrubbing restaurant floors.

== Life in America ==
Luetgert immigrated to New York City around 1865 or 1866, when he was about twenty years old. He had heard that thousands of his countrymen were going to America with very little money but were able to find work. With about thirty dollars to his name, Luetgert boarded a ship bound for the United States.

After a short time in New York, Luetgert traveled to Quincy, Illinois, to join some friends of his eldest brother Henry, who were living there. He stayed in Quincy for about four months before moving to Chicago in search of a job at a tannery, which he found at Union Hide and Leather Company. Luetgert did not have a steady job or constant pay at the tannery, so he began also to take on random jobs such as working as a moving man. From 1867 to 1868, Luetgert worked at another tannery called Engle, Crossley & Co. He next worked at a tannery called Craig, Clark & Company, but returned to the Engle tannery, working there until 1872. He had saved four thousand dollars and started his own business, initially dealing in liquor before starting his eponymous sausage company in 1879.

Luetgert married his first wife, Caroline Roepke, on April 13, 1872, at Chicago, Illinois; their two sons, Max and Arnold, were born there in 1873 and 1875. Caroline died on November 17, 1877. He married his second wife Louisa Bicknese, two months after Caroline's death, on January 18, 1878. Luetgert fathered a total of six children—two with Caroline and four with Louisa. Only three of these children survived past the age of 2.

== Murder and police investigation ==
Louisa Luetgert was reported as missing on May 1, 1897. Adolph Luetgert told their children that their mother had gone to visit her sister on the previous night but never came back. After a few days, Louisa's brother, Diedrich Bicknese, went to the police to report her disappearance. Luetgert told the police that she ran away with another man.

During their investigation, the police learned that the couple had a history of domestic violence and that they fought on a regular basis. According to a source, Luetgert had financial difficulties during the Panic of 1896. He had started courting a rich widow whom he planned to marry once he got rid of his wife.

The police discovered that on the night of May 1, 1897, the night Louisa disappeared, she was seen entering the sausage factory with her husband at 10:30pm. A watchman from the factory confirmed the account, saying that Luetgert gave him an errand to run and told him that he could take the rest of the night off. The police also came across bills that documented Luetgert having bought arsenic and potash the day before the murder. Due to all the accumulated evidence, they were convinced that Luetgert had killed his wife, boiled her in lye, and disposed of her remains by burning them in the factory furnace.

The officers started searching in the furnace, where they found burned foul sausages and human remains. They also found two of Louisa's rings, including one that had the initials "LL" engraved on it. Bone fragments identified by a forensic anthropologist included metatarsal bones, toe phalanx, and the head of rib. Due to the overwhelming evidence, Luetgert, still claiming his innocence, was arrested and tried.

== Trials ==
Luetgert's first murder trial began in August 1897 and took place in the Cook County courthouse with Judge Richard Tuthill presiding. Luetgert was defended by William Vincent and prosecuted by State's Attorney Charles S. Deneen. The latter was later elected as governor of Illinois for two terms, and as US Senator for Illinois.

The prosecution presented bone fragments and the ring inscribed "LL", recovered from one of the grinders in Luetgert's sausage factory, as its main evidence that Louisa had been killed there. The defense argued that Louisa Luetgert had left her house freely on May 1, 1897, citing many claims of people around the US who said that they had seen her after the trial began. During the trial, observers thought that Luetgert seemed unconcerned and overly confident that he would be found innocent. The jury was unable to reach a unanimous verdict, resulting in a hung jury.

The case was retried in January 1898 at the same courthouse. The prosecution used George Amos Dorsey, an anthropologist from the Field Columbian Museum in Chicago, as an expert witness to prove that the bones found were human. This time, the jury came to a unanimous verdict that Luetgert was guilty. Luetgert was convicted and sentenced to life in prison on February 9, 1898. Eighteen months later, on July 7, 1899, Luetgert was found dead in his cell at the Illinois State Penitentiary. The official cause of death was "fatty degenerative heart disease".

This case was one of the first trials to be widely covered by the media. Newspapers from Chicago reported on it daily, and some of the reporters tried to eavesdrop on the jury deliberations. It is credited with making murder trials a subject of general interest in the media. This case also was one of the earliest to use an anthropologist as a forensic expert in a trial.

== Myths about Mrs. Luetgert ==
There were many "sightings" of Louisa Luetgert after the trial began. She was sighted in twelve different states but never found. One of the most famous myths was that she was seen boarding a ship in New York bound for Europe. When Adolph Luetgert heard this, he said that he thought she was definitely fleeing the country. Louisa, however, was never reported as seen outside the United States.

== The factory ==
Some claim that the Luetgert factory burned to the ground in 1902. Robert Loerzel documented that the factory still stands, although a fire took place there on June 26, 1904. Today, the factory stands on the south side of the 1700 block of West Diversey Parkway. It has been converted into residential condominiums.
