= Robert Louis =

Robert Louis may refer to:

- Robert Louis (heraldry) (1902–65), see Armorial of the Communes of Manche
- Robert Louis-Dreyfus (1946–2009), French businessman

== Fictional characters ==
- Bob Louis, a character in the 1993 television series The Detectives

== See also ==
- Robert Lewis (disambiguation)
