= John Henry Keen =

Anglican missionary, linguist, and naturalist

- Born: 1851; England
- Died: 1950 (aged 98–99)
- Occupations: Anglican missionary, ethnographer and naturalist

John Henry Keen (1851–1950) was an Anglican missionary in Canada, known for translating scriptures into Haida. While serving as a missionary, he also contributed to Canada's natural history, writing on insects he discovered; he had a species of mouse and bat named after him.

== Early years and ordination ==
John Henry Keen was born in England in 1851; he graduated from a Bible college in Islington in 1873. In 1874 he was sent by the Bishop of London as a missionary at Moose Fort in Ontario. He was ordained by John Horden, Bishop of Moosonee in 1877.

== 1880s and 1890s ==
From 1882 to 1889, he was in London, where he was first a curate at Spitalfields and later in Islington. In 1890, he left again for Canada where he was based at the northern end of Graham Island in British Columbia. He lived at a village called Masset where several families would share a longhouse which typically had totem poles outside.

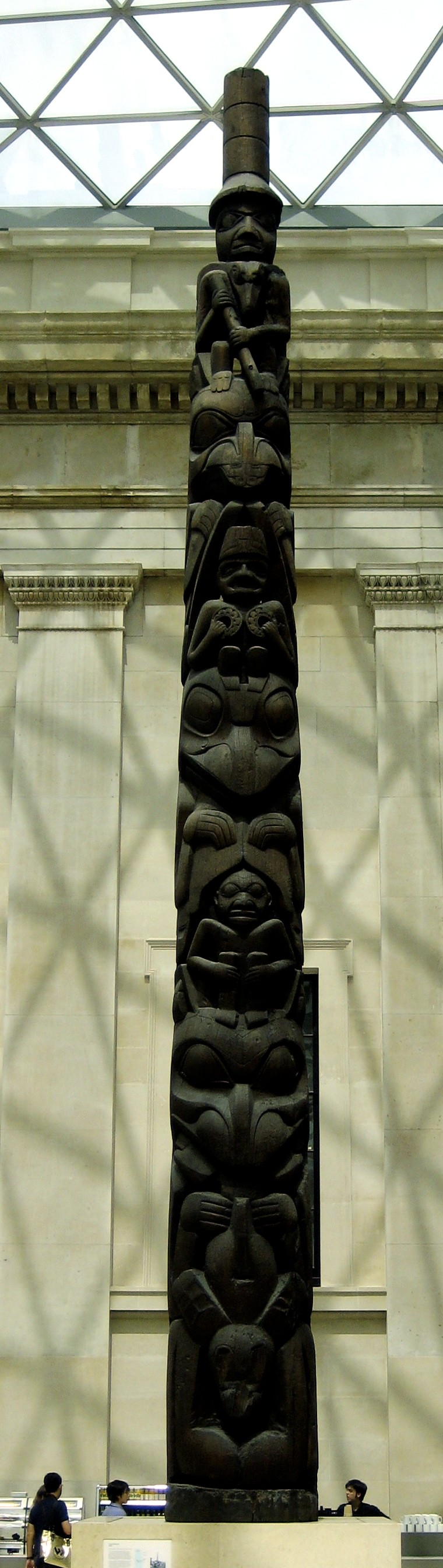
A totem pole, sold to the British Museum by Charles F. Newcombe, which Keen helped to interpret.

Whilst in Canada Keen translated the Book of Common Prayer into Haida; he later translated the gospels of Luke and John and the Acts of the Apostles.

In Masset, Keen took an interest in natural history. In 1891, he published his first paper on local beetles (Some British Columbian Coleoptera) and sent off 46 samples for identification to the British Museum. In 1894 he first described the Northwestern deer mouse, which was named Keen's mouse, or Peromyscus keeni, in his honour. He was also the first to scientifically describe a type of brown mouse eared bat. This animal is now called Keen's myotis (Myotis keenii Trouessart). In 1896 he also found the first type specimen of what is now known to be a sub-species of northern saw-whet owl.

Keen returned on leave in 1898 and his translated prayer book was published in 1899 in London by the Missionary Society. The book went out of print as a result of its intended audience dying out. It is estimated that before the Europeans arrived, there were 10,000 people who spoke Haida. By 1900, there were about 700. There were thought to be only about 30 people in 1999 who spoke the Haida language,

== Artifacts ==
In the 1890s there were visits from the English Charles F. Newcombe, George Amos Dorsey from Chicago and a Scottish guide named James Deans. These people were travelling to gather artefacts that might be of ethnographic interest. Their methods varied, but they frequently held little regard for the native Canadians. Keen had to angrily take them to task after he travelled to confirm for himself that visitors had not only raided graves but also not restored them to there former state. Keen found hair and coffins strewn about from where they had dug to steal skulls and bones. Keen wrote to complain about the desecration and challenged Dean to name his accomplices although he was clear that the benefactor of their work was the Field Columbian Museum and that the perpetrators were Americans. George Dorsey was known for his haste in finding artefacts was told of Keen's letter to the "Daily Colonist and he argued that Keen's anger should be ignored.

The British Museum bought a number of artefacts from Keen, including a model of a house and an attached totem pole which had been carved by John Gwaytihl. The museum also bought another 44 objects and received a description of the story that the totem pole was intended to tell. By coincidence the museum acquired a complete 39-foot-high totem pole that differed only slightly from the model in 1903. The museum now not only has the pole but it has a description of its significance and symbols. The museum bought the pole from Charles Frederick Newcombe.

== 20th century activities ==
Keen returned to Canada again in 1899, but this time he was based at Metlakatla, where he stayed until 1913.

Keen died in 1950.
