= Alfred Lewis =

Alfred Lewis may refer to:

- Alfred Baker Lewis (1897–1980), American lawyer, union organizer, socialist, and civil rights activist
- Alfred E. Lewis (died 1994), Washington Post crime reporter
- Alfred Henry Lewis (1855–1914), American investigative journalist, lawyer, novelist, editor, and short story writer
- Sir Alfred Edward Lewis (1868–1940), British banker and economist

== See also ==
- Al Lewis (disambiguation)
- Alfie Lewis (born 1999), English footballer
