= Allen Lewis =

Allen Lewis may refer to:

- Allen Montgomery Lewis (1909–1993), barrister, public servant and governor-general of Saint Lucia
- Allen Lewis (sportswriter) (1916–2003), American sports writer
- Allen Cleveland Lewis (1821–1877), founder of the Lewis Institute
- Allen Lewis (footballer) (1916–1986), Australian rules footballer

== See also ==
- Alan Lewis (disambiguation)
- Alun Lewis (disambiguation)
- Allan Lewis (disambiguation)
- Lewis Allen (disambiguation)
