= Maclean's =

Canadian monthly magazine

- Maclean's cover, 2025
- Editor-in-Chief: Sarah Fulford
- Categories: magazine (general interest until 1975)
- Frequency: Print: Monthly (semi-monthly/fortnightly 1920–1966, 1975–1978, weekly 1978–2016); Digital: Monthly
- Publisher: Maclean-Hunter Publishing Company Limited (1887–1961); Maclean-Hunter Limited (1961–1968); Maclean-Hunter Publishing (1968-1994); Rogers Media (1994-2019); St. Joseph Communications (since 2019)
- Total circulation: Paid print: 225,963 (June 2016)
- First issue: October 1905; 121 years ago (as The Business Magazine); 1911 (as Maclean's)
- Country: Canada
- Based in: Toronto, Ontario
- Language: English
- Website: www.macleans.ca
- ISSN: 0024-9262
- OCLC: 1756390

Maclean's is a Canadian magazine founded in 1905 which reports on Canadian issues such as politics, pop culture, trends and current events. Its founder, publisher John Bayne Maclean, established the magazine to provide a uniquely Canadian perspective on current affairs and to "entertain but also inspire its readers". Rogers Media, the magazine's publisher since 1994 (after the company acquired Maclean-Hunter Publishing), announced in September 2016 that Maclean's would become a monthly beginning January 2017, while continuing to produce a weekly issue on the Texture app. In 2019, the magazine was bought by its current publisher, St. Joseph Communications.

== History ==
The Business Magazine was founded in October 1905 by then 43-year-old publisher and entrepreneur Lt.-Col. John Bayne Maclean, who wrote the magazine's aim was not "merely to entertain but also to inspire its readers". It was renamed The Busy Man's Magazine in December 1905, and began providing "uniquely Canadian perspective" on varied topics such as immigration, national defence, home life, women's suffrage, and fiction. Maclean renamed the magazine after himself in 1911, dropping the previous title as too evocative of a business magazine for what had become a general interest publication.

Maclean hired Thomas B. Costain as editor in 1914. Costain invigorated the magazine's coverage of the First World War, running first-person accounts of life on the Western Front as well as Maclean's own critiques of Canada's war effort. Maclean's articles came into conflict with wartime censorship regulations, and Costain was ordered to remove one such article from the May 1918 issue as it was too critical of war policy.

Costain encouraged literary pieces and artistic expressions and ran fiction by Robert W. Service, Lucy Maud Montgomery, Herbert Joseph (Hopkins) Moorhouse, O. Henry, and Ray Bradbury; commentary by Stephen Leacock and illustrations by C. W. Jefferys, F. S. Coburn, and several Group of Seven members, including A. J. Casson, Arthur Lismer, and J. E. H. MacDonald.

In 1919, the magazine moved from monthly to fortnightly publication and ran an exposé by Emily Murphy of the drug trade. In 1925 the circulation of the magazine was 82,013 copies. Costain left the magazine to become a novelist and was replaced by J. Vernon Mackenzie who remained at the helm until 1926. During his tenure, Maclean's achieved national stature.

After Mackenzie, H. Napier Moore became the new editor. An Englishman, he saw the magazine as an expression of Canada's role in the British Empire. Moore ultimately became a figurehead with the day-to-day running of the magazine falling to managing editor W. Arthur Irwin, a Canadian nationalist, who saw the magazine as an exercise in nation-building, giving it a mandate to promote national pride. Under Irwin's influence, the magazine's covers promoted Canadian scenery and imagery. The magazine also sponsored an annual short story contest on Canadian themes and acquired a sports department. Irwin was also responsible for orienting the magazine towards both small and big "L" Liberalism.

During the Second World War, Maclean's ran an overseas edition for Canadian troops serving abroad. By the time of its final run in 1946, the "bantam" edition had a circulation of 800,000. Maclean's war coverage featured war photography by Yousuf Karsh, later an internationally acclaimed portrait photographer, and articles by war correspondents John Clare and Lionel Shapiro.

Irwin officially replaced Moore as editor in 1945. He reoriented the magazine by building it around news features written by a new cadre of writers that included Pierre Berton, W. O. Mitchell, Scott Young, Ralph Allen, and Blair Fraser.

Allen became editor upon Irwin's acceptance of a diplomatic posting in 1950. This era of the magazine was noted for its articles on the Canadian landscape and profiles of town and city life. The feature article, "Canada's North", by Pierre Berton, promoted a new national interest in the Arctic. Prominent writers during this period included Robert Fulford, Peter Gzowski, Peter C. Newman, Trent Frayne, June Callwood, McKenzie Porter, Robert Thomas Allen and Christina McCall. Exposés in the 1950s challenged the criminal justice system, explored LSD, and discussed artificial insemination.

Maclean's published an editorial the day after the 1957 federal election announcing the predictable re-election of the St. Laurent Liberal Party. Written before the election results were known, Allen failed to anticipate the upset election of the Progressive Conservative Party under John Diefenbaker.

As the magazine struggled to compete with television in the 1960s, it increased its international coverage and attempted to keep up with the sexual revolution through a succession of editors including Gzowski and Charles Templeton. Templeton quit after a short time at the helm due to his frustration with interference by the publishing company, Maclean-Hunter. In 1961, Maclean's began publishing a French-language edition, Le Magazine Maclean, which survived until 1976, when the edition was absorbed by L'actualité.

Peter C. Newman became editor in 1971, and attempted to revive the magazine by publishing feature articles by writers such as Barbara Frum and Michael Enright, and poetry by Irving Layton. Walter Stewart, correspondent and eventually managing editor during this period, often clashed with Newman. In 1975 Newman brought in columnist Allan Fotheringham. Fotheringham made famous The Back Page, where he wrote for 27 years. Readers would go to read The Back Page first and then proceed to read the magazine from back to front.

Under Newman, the magazine switched from being a monthly general interest publication to a bi-weekly news magazine in 1975, and to a weekly newsmagazine three years later. The magazine opened news bureaus across the country and international bureaus in London and Washington, D.C.

In 1982, when Newman retired, his managing editor, Kevin Doyle, became editor-in-chief. Doyle, a former reporter for The Canadian Press in Ottawa and a New York-based writer for Newsweek, expanded coverage of news and opened a Moscow bureau. On his watch the magazine published the first of yearly annual polls by Allan Gregg on the Canadian condition and the controversial university ranking issue, which became an annual mini-franchise for the magazine. At its peak, the magazine had 2.3 million weekly readers.

When Doyle left Maclean's in 1993, publisher Brian Segal appointed Robert Lewis as editor-in-chief. The managing editor under Doyle, Lewis had opened the magazine's Ottawa bureau in 1975 when it became a newsmagazine. Under Doyle, Lewis was responsible for the launch of the first university ranking issue. While he was editor, writer Ann Dowsett Johnston won several National Magazine Awards (NMA) for the annual university issue and the magazine received an honourable mention in the 1998 Michener Awards for investigative reporting on sexual harassment and rape in the Canadian military. The article by Jane O'Hara also won two medals at the National Magazine Awards in 1999, including the President's Medal, and "remains one of the most significant and studied feature stories in the history of Canadian magazines," according to an official NMA history.

=== 21st century ===
In 2001, Anthony Wilson-Smith became the 15th editor in the magazine's history. He left the post at the end of February 2005 and was replaced by Kenneth Whyte, who also served as the magazine's publisher.

Whyte, who previously edited Saturday Night and the National Post, brought a right-wing focus to the magazine, bringing in conservative columnist Mark Steyn, hiring Andrew Coyne away from the Post, and rehiring Barbara Amiel. He also added a comedy feature by former Liberal Party strategist Scott Feschuk, and a column by Andrew Potter, who previously wrote for left-leaning periodicals.

The October 4, 2010, edition of the magazine — published online September 24, 2010 — had a cover article with the headline: "Quebec: The Most Corrupt Province", with the subheading, "Why does Quebec claim so many of the nation's political scandals?" The cover illustration featured the Quebec Winter Carnival mascot, Bonhomme, carrying a suitcase overflowing with cash.

This depiction angered some Quebec politicians and organizers of the Carnival. Quebec Premier Jean Charest, wrote a letter to the editor of Maclean's condemning the magazine's "twisted form of journalism and ignorance", calling it "sensationalist", "far from serious", "simplistic", and "offensive", saying the editor "discredited" the magazine.

The magazine refused to back away from its position vis-à-vis corruption in Quebec. A bilingual editorial said that Charest's response to the Maclean's article was an attempt to "implicate ordinary citizens in a scandal created by [its] politicians". Maclean's acknowledged "that neither its cover story nor an accompanying column provided empirical evidence that Quebec is more corrupt than other provinces". Yet, "that does not mean we are required to suspend all judgment in the face of a preponderance of evidence—scandal after scandal at every level of government in the province, all of them involving not just one or two bad actors but systemic corruption.

Not all opinion in Quebec ran contrary to Maclean's position. The French-language La Presse, the province's leading broadsheet, wrote that "[Maclean's] claim that Quebec has a higher number of scandals is 'undeniable'."

Despite the steadfast position of Maclean's editorial board, the magazine's publisher issued a qualified apology. On September 30, 2010, referring to the controversy, Brian Segal, the president of Rogers Publishing, apologized for "any offence that the cover may have caused", saying the province "is an important market for the company and we look forward to participating in the dynamic growth of the province and its citizens".

The organizers of Carnaval de Québec sued Maclean's over the cover showing the iconic figure, settling out of court in November 2010.

Rogers Communications announced in September 2016 that, due to falling print ad revenue, the magazine would change its printing schedule from weekly to monthly beginning in January 2017 although it would continue to offer weekly digital editions via Rogers' Texture digital bundle.

On March 20, 2019, Rogers announced a deal to sell the magazine to St. Joseph Communications. Maclean's continues to publish 12 editions annually.

== Canadian Islamic Congress complaint ==
In December 2007, the Canadian Islamic Congress (CIC) launched complaints with the Canadian Human Rights Commission, British Columbia Human Rights Commission, and the Ontario Human Rights Commission against Maclean's, accusing it of publishing 18 articles between January 2005 and July 2007 the group considered Islamophobic in nature, including a column by Mark Steyn titled "The future belongs to Islam". According to the CIC complaint (as discussed in a National Post article by Ezra Levant), Maclean's is "flagrantly Islamophobic" and "subjects Canadian Muslims to hatred and contempt". In contrast, Levant said the complainants were "illiberal censors who have found a quirk in our legal system, and are using it to undermine our Western traditions of freedom". On October 10, 2008, the B.C. Human Rights Tribunal dismissed the allegations of "hate speech" made by the Canadian Islamic Congress. Maclean's consistently took the position that Steyn's article, an excerpt from his best-selling book, America Alone, is a worthy contribution to an important debate on geopolitical and demographic issues, and that plaintiff's demands for equal space for a rebuttal was unreasonable and untenable.

Accusations that Maclean's supported Islamophobic articles and writers continued after the Oct. 26, 2013 issue featured an interview with singer Celine Dion wherein the singer was reported as making racist and insensitive comments about Muslim women's right to wear religious clothing under the proposed Quebec Charter of Values. During a press conference in Montreal on November 9, 2013, Dion's husband and manager Rene Angelil refuted claims that the singer made such comments, touching on both his and Celine's shared ancestry: "… both Céline and I share family coming from the Middle-East — me from Lebanon and Syria and her fathers family from Lebanon also… to say she'd make these comments is hurtful to both Céline and her Muslim fans and we have made contact with Maclean's through our legal team."

On January 19, 2014, it was reported by Québécois media that Maclean's and Dion's team had reached an agreement outside of court, with Maclean's making a (now redacted) apology to Dion within the original article.

== "Too Asian?" article ==
In the November 2010 university ranking issue under the editorship of Kenneth Whyte and Mark Stevenson, reporter Stephanie Findlay and senior writer Nicholas Köhler wrote an article about the perceived over-representation of Asian students at Canadian universities, entitled "Too Asian?" This led to allegations that Maclean's intentionally perpetuated racial stereotypes to court controversy for the sake of publicity. Amidst criticism from a number of student unions and politicians, on December 16, 2010, Toronto's city council voted to request an apology from Maclean's magazine as the third Canadian city to do so after Victoria and Vancouver. In a letter to the Minister of Canadian Heritage, Senator Vivienne Poy suggested that public outrage over the Maclean's article, "defined as material that is denigrating to an identifiable group", should deem it ineligible for government funding.

== Editors-in-chief ==
- W. Arnot Craick (1905—1910)
- Roy Fry (1911—1913)
- Thomas B. Costain (1914—1921)
- J. Vernon Mackenzie(1921—1926)
- H. Napier Moore (1926—1945)
- W. Arthur Irwin (1945—1950)
- Ralph Allen (1950—1960)
- Blair Fraser (1960—1962)
- Ken Lefolii (1962—1964)
- Borden Spears (1964—1969)
- Charles Templeton (1969)
- Peter Gzowski (1970)
- Peter C. Newman (1971—1982)
- Kevin Doyle (1982—1993)
- Robert Lewis (1993—2000)
- Anthony Wilson-Smith (2000—2005)
- Kenneth Whyte (2005—2011)
- Mark Stevenson (2011—2016)
- Alison Uncles (2016—2022)
- Sarah Fulford (2022—present)

Editors-in-chief, French-language edition:

- Pierre de Bellefeuille (1960-1964)

== Guide to Canadian Universities ==
Cover of 2008 Guide to Canadian Universities

The Maclean's Guide to Canadian Universities is published annually in March. It is also known as Maclean's University Guide. It includes information from the Maclean's University Rankings, an issue of the magazine proper that is published annually in November, primarily for students in their last year of high school and entering their first year in Canadian universities. Both the Guide and the rankings issue feature articles discussing Canadian universities and ranking them by order of quality. The rankings focus on taking a measure of the "undergraduate experience", comparing universities in three peer groupings: Primarily Undergraduate, Comprehensive, and Medical Doctoral.

Schools in the Primarily Undergraduate category are largely focused on undergraduate education, with relatively few graduate programs. Comprehensives have a significant amount of research activity and a wide range of graduate and undergraduate programs, including professional degrees. Medical Doctoral institutions have a broad range of PhD programs and research, as well as medical schools.

In early 2006, Maclean's announced that in June 2006, it would be introducing a new annual issue called the University Student Issue. The issue would feature the results of a survey of recent university graduates from each Canadian university. However, many universities, such as the University of Calgary, McMaster University, and the University of Toronto, refused to take part in this exercise. The three institutions stated that they questioned the "magazine's ability to conduct a survey that would be rigorous and provide accurate and useful information to students and their parents". In response, Maclean's sought the results of two university-commissioned student surveys: the Canadian Undergraduate Survey Consortium (CUSC) and the National Survey of Student Engagement (NSSE). Results from these surveys, along with Maclean's own graduate survey, were published in the June 26, 2006, edition of Maclean's.

For the November 2006 University Rankings issue, 22 Canadian universities refused to provide information directly to Maclean's. To rank those universities, the magazine relied on data it collected itself, as well as data drawn from third party sources such as Statistics Canada. Among the universities that refused to provide information directly to Maclean's in the fall of 2006 were: University of British Columbia, University of Toronto, Dalhousie University, McMaster University, University of New Brunswick, University of Manitoba, Université du Québec network, Simon Fraser University, University of Alberta, University of Calgary, University of Lethbridge, Ryerson University, Université de Montréal, University of Ottawa, York University, Concordia University, University of Western Ontario, Lakehead University, Queen's University, Carleton University, and University of Windsor. The withholding of data served as a means of voicing the universities' displeasure with the methodology used to determine the Maclean's ranking. Indira Samarasekera, president of The University of Alberta, further discussed this in the article, "Rising Up Against Rankings", published in the April 2, 2007, issue of Inside Higher Ed.

The University Rankings Issue contains a compilation of different charts and lists judging the different aspects of universities in different categories. The three main areas listed in chart form in the University Rankings Issue as at November 3, 2006, are: the overall rankings themselves, the university student surveys, and the magazine's "national reputational rankings" of the schools.

The National Reputational Rankings, like the main university rankings, are broken into three subcategories: medical doctoral, comprehensive, and primarily undergraduate and are based on opinions of the quality of the universities. The quality opinions gathered were contributed by secondary school principals, guidance counsellors, organization and company heads, and recruiters. The results of the reputational rankings are included in the main university rankings, and account for 16% of a university's total ranking score.

=== Criticism ===
A University of Windsor team, led by professors Stewart Page and Ken Cramer, conducted an annual analysis of the Maclean's Guide to Canadian Universities since its inception, publishing compiled findings as The Marketing of Canadian University Rankings: A Misadventure Now 24 Years Old, in 2016, summarized by its authors as:

Based on analyses of Maclean’s ranking data pertaining to Canadian universities published over the last 24 years, we present a summary of statistical findings of annual ranking exercises, as well as discussion about their current status and the effects upon student welfare. Some illustrative tables are also presented. Using correlational and cluster analyses, for each year, we have found largely nonsignificant, inconsistent, and uninterpretable relations between rank standings of universities and Maclean’s main measures, as well as between rank standings and the many specific indices used to generate these standings. In our opinion, when assessed in terms of their empirical characteristics, the annual data show generally that this system of ranking is highly limited in terms of its practical or academic value to students.

— The Marketing of Canadian University Rankings: A Misadventure Now 24 Years Old

Co-author Stewart Page had observed, in 2012, that numerous Canadian schools had withdrawn active cooperation from Maclean’s annual surveys.

== See also ==
- Media in Canada
