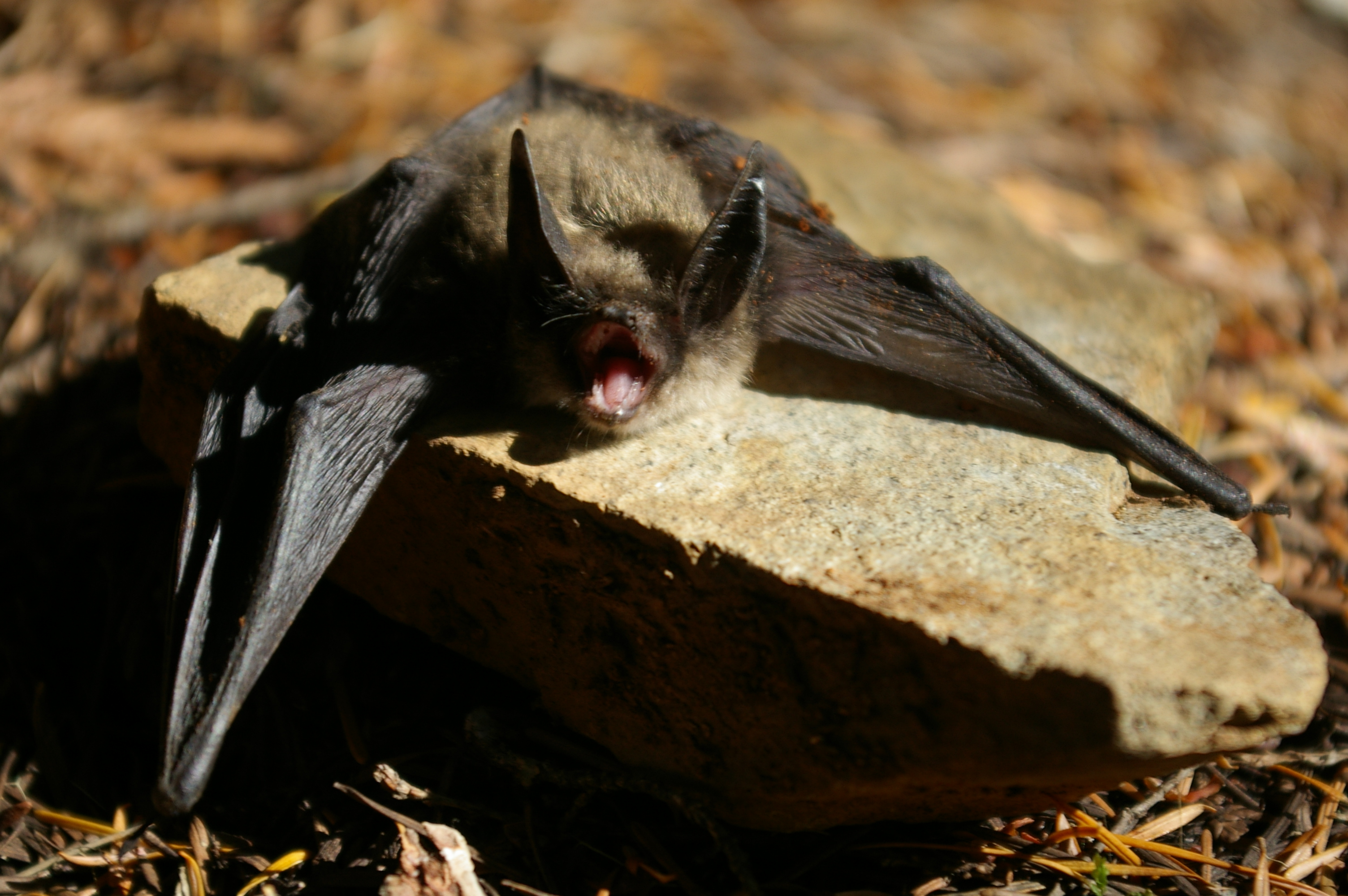

Conservation status
- Least Concern (IUCN 3.1)

Scientific classification
- Kingdom: Animalia
- Phylum: Chordata
- Class: Mammalia
- Order: Chiroptera
- Family: Vespertilionidae
- Genus: Myotis
- Species: M. keenii

Binomial name
- Myotis keenii (Merriam, 1895)
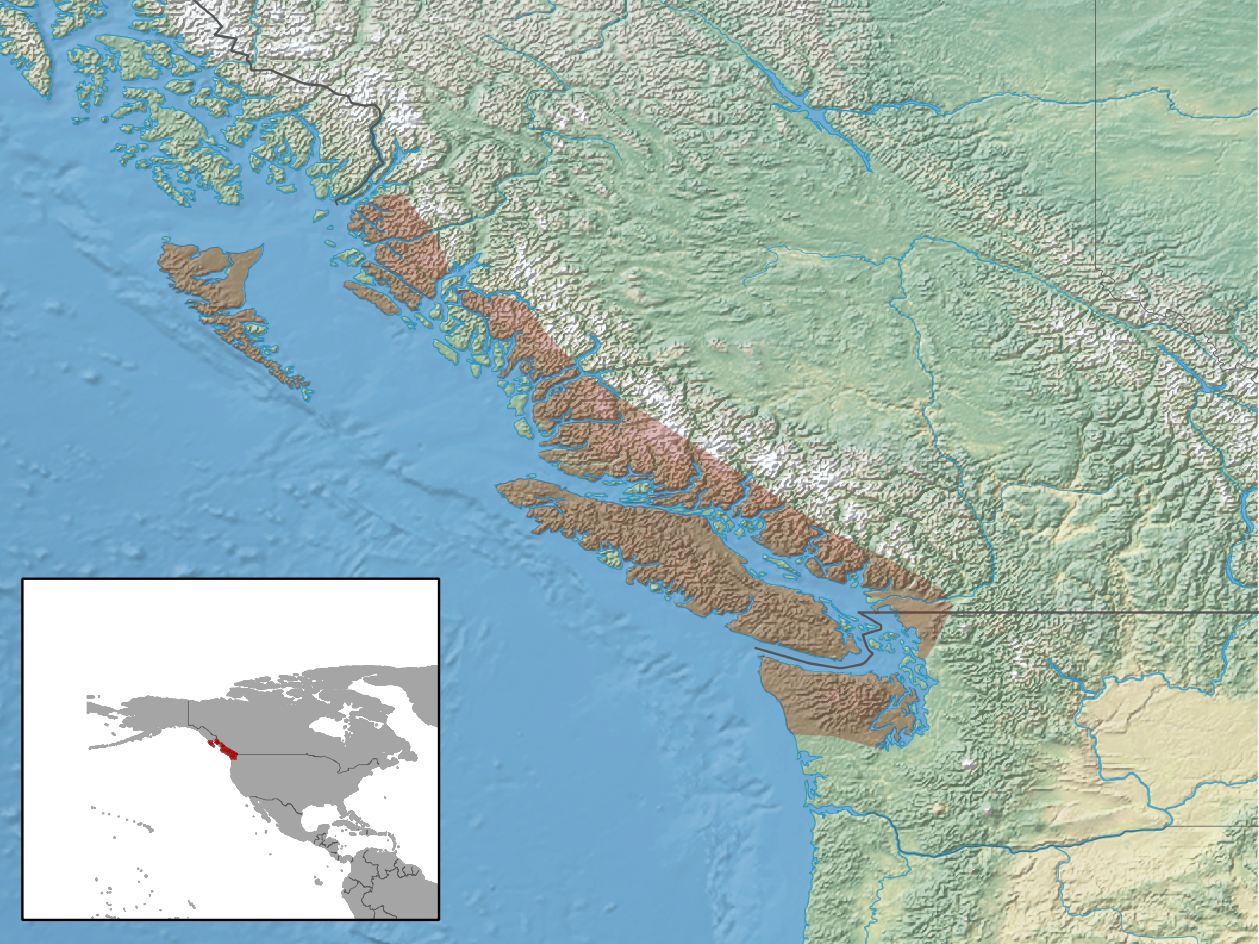

= Keen's myotis =

Species of bat

Keen's myotis (Myotis keenii) is a species of vesper bat. It is found in British Columbia in Canada and in Washington and Alaska in the United States. It is named after the Rev. John Henry Keen, who collected the specimen that formed the basis for the first scientific description of the species. Classification for Keen's myotis formerly included the northern long-eared myotis (Myotis septentrionalis), resulting in older studies confusing the species for one another.

== Description ==
Measurements: Forearm 1.4-1.6 in., WT 0.25–0.33 oz (7.1–9.4 g). Average body length 8–9 cm, tail length 4–5 cm. In appearance, Keen's myotis is very similar to other long-eared bats of the same range, with characteristic dark brown patches on the shoulders. As noted by Smith and Doe (2023), the species also has a preference for specific day-roosting sites, varying with local conditions and availability of suitable roosting structures. Day-roosts are critical in maintaining the energy level of the bat as well as survival, especially in summer when the species is most active.

== Behavior ==
Keen's myotis prefers coastal habitats, but is often found in urban areas as well. It frequently roosts in trees and rock crevices. It is nocturnal and insectivorous. Keen's myotis probably exhibits the same breeding habits of other temperate vespertilionids, but there is little data available.

== Lifespan ==
In the wild, Keen's myotis is recorded living upwards of 12 years, while in captivity, it is reported living 19 years.

== See also ==
- Bats of Canada
- Bats of the United States
