= Herbert Lewis =

Herbert Lewis may refer to:

- Herbert Lewis (politician) (1858–1933), Welsh politician
- Herbert L. Lewis (1898-1971), American journalist and newspaper editor
- Herbert Clyde Lewis (1909–1950), American novelist
- Herbert S. Lewis (born 1934), professor of anthropology
- Sir Herbert Lewis of the Lewis baronets
- Herbie Lewis (musician) (1941–2007), American hard bop double bassist
- Herbie Lewis (ice hockey) (1906–1991), Canadian ice hockey left winger

== See also ==
- Bert Lewis (disambiguation)
- Herbert Louis (1928–2016), American orthopedic surgeon
