= Robert G. Lewis =

American photographer (1916–2011)

Robert Grier Lewis (born December 5, 1916, in Philadelphia, Pennsylvania; died January 6, 2011, in Ormond-by-the-Sea, Florida) was an American photographer, editor and author in the field of railways.

== Career ==
After completing his high school education in Germantown, Pennsylvania, he began working for the Pennsylvania Railroad (PRR) on August 8, 1934.

From April 15, 1940, to January 15, 1941, he worked for the Bessemer and Lake Erie Railroad. From 1941 to 1942, he returned to work in the freight transport division of the Pennsylvania Railroad in Cleveland and Akron. After his military service in the US Navy from 1942 to 1946, he was again employed by the Pennsylvania Railroad.

In 1947, Lewis joined Railway Age in Chicago as assistant editor, later rising to become an editor for the magazine's transport division. In 1950, he became head of sales for Railway Age publisher Simmons-Boardman, and in 1956, he was named editor of Railway Age. He held this position until 1995. He was also temporarily appointed president and chairman of the board of Simmons-Boardman.

While at Simmons-Boardman, he was responsible for founding the International Railway Journal in 1961.

After retiring in 1995, Lewis continued to work as a consultant to the railway industry, as well as acting as Simmons-Boardman's director of special projects.

Lewis began taking pictures of trains at age 13, accumulating a large collection over the course of his life. He was a founding member of the Philadelphia section of the National Railroad Historical Society, founded 1936.

== Publications ==
- The handbook of American railroads . Simmons-Boardman 1951.
- The handbook of American railroads . Simmons-Boardman 1956.
- Railway age's comprehensive railroad dictionary . Simmons-Boardman 1984.
- Off the beaten track. A railroader's life in pictures . Simmons-Boardman 2004.
- Keystone state traction. Pennsylvania's historic trolley systems. Central Electric Railfans Association 2008.
