= Allan Lewis =

Allan Lewis may refer to:

- Allan Lewis (baseball) (born 1941), former baseball player
- Allan Lewis (footballer) (born 1971), Welsh former professional footballer
- Allan Lewis (rugby union) (born 1942), former Wales international rugby union player
- Allan Leonard Lewis (1895–1918), English recipient of the Victoria Cross

== See also ==
- Alan Lewis (disambiguation)
- Alun Lewis (disambiguation)
- Allen Lewis (disambiguation)
- Lewis Allen (disambiguation)
