= Alan Lewis =

Alan Lewis may refer to:

- Alan Lewis (footballer) (1954–2016), English footballer
- Alan Lewis (rugby union and cricket) (born 1964), Irish cricketer and rugby union referee
- Alan Lewis (sport shooter) (born 1950), Irish sport shooter
- Alan Lewis (music journalist) (1945–2021), British music journalist and editor
- Alan Shane Lewis, Canadian comedian, actor and television host

== See also ==
- Brad Alan Lewis (born 1954), American rower
- Alun Lewis (disambiguation)
- Al Lewis (disambiguation)
- Allan Lewis (disambiguation)
- Allen Lewis (disambiguation)
