= Robert Lewis (journalist) =

Canadian journalist and executive (born 1943)

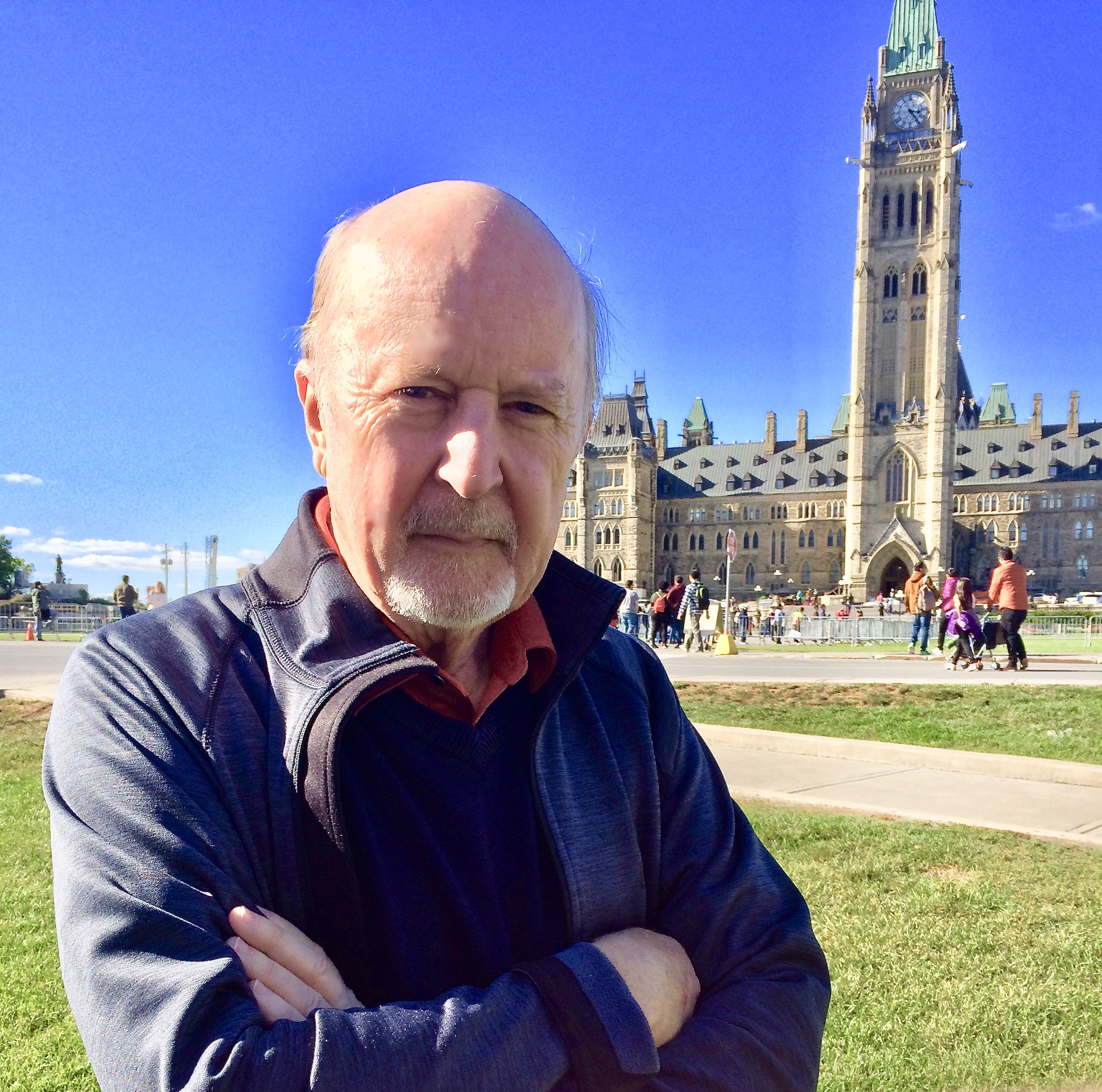
Robert Lewis, Parliament Hill, 2017

Robert Lewis (born August 19, 1943) is a Canadian journalist, author and media executive who served as editor-in-chief of Maclean's Magazine.

In 2018 Dundurn Press published his book, Power, Prime Ministers and the Press: The Battle for Truth on Parliament Hill, a history of the Canadian Parliamentary press gallery (Dundurn Press, October 2018). In 2019 it was selected for the long list of the Taylor Prize for literary non-fiction. The book is based on interviews and archival research about the interplay between reporters and Canada's 23 prime ministers .

Lewis is a former editor-in-chief of Maclean's newsmagazine (1993–2000) and was a member of the Parliamentary Press Gallery for more than a decade.

After graduating with an English degree from Loyola College in 1964, Lewis worked as a reporter for The Montreal Star. He was bureau chief for Time Magazine in Montreal (1967–1969), a correspondent in Ottawa (1969–1971) and Boston (1971–1972) and bureau chief in Toronto (1972–1975). In 1975, Lewis became bureau chief for Maclean's in Ottawa, then Maclean's managing editor in 1982, and editor-in-chief from 1993 to the end of 2000.

Lewis was responsible for the launch of the annual university rankings feature and led the team that moved Maclean's into online publishing. In 2001, Lewis joined Rogers Media Incorporated as vice president of content development.

Since his retirement in 2008, Lewis has worked as a freelance editor and media consultant. Lewis was a member of York University's Board of Governors. Lewis is also a founding member of the Canadian Journalism Foundation and served as chair of the board of directors.

A native of Waterloo, Quebec, he and Sally O'Neill, whom he married in 1967, now live in Toronto.
