= Allen Lewis (footballer) =

Australian rules footballer, born 1916

Personal information
- Full name: Allen James Lewis
- Born: 27 November 1916; Horsham, Victoria
- Died: 20 December 1986 (aged 70); Frankston, Victoria
- Original team: Richmond City
- Height: 178 cm (5 ft 10 in)
- Weight: 89 kg (196 lb)

Playing career^{1}
Years	Club	Games (Goals)
1944	Richmond	3 (0)
- ^{1} Playing statistics correct to the end of 1944.

Allen James Lewis (27 November 1916 – 20 December 1986) was an Australian rules footballer who played for the Richmond Football Club in the Victorian Football League (VFL).
