= Albert Buell Lewis =

American anthropologist

- Born: June 21, 1867; Clifton, Ohio
- Died: October 10, 1940 (aged 73); Chicago, Illinois
- Education: Ph.D. in Anthropology, Columbia University
- Occupation: Anthropologist
- Spouse: Gerturde Clayton

Albert Buell Lewis (June 21, 1867 – October 10, 1940) was the first American anthropologist to conduct a systematic, long-term field study in Melanesia, A. B. Lewis is best remembered for the collection and documentation of over 14,000 Melanesian objects gathered in the colonial territories of Melanesia during his time as the leader of the Joseph N. Field South Pacific Expedition from 1909 to 1913. This extensive collection and documentation is now housed at the Field Museum of Natural History in Chicago, Illinois.

== Early life ==
A. B. Lewis was born on June 21, 1867, in Clifton, Ohio. He was the only child of successful Presbyterian citizens, Charles Bennet Lewis and his wife, Anna E. Mckeehan. After the passing of Lewis’ mother, his father remarried to Susan M. Waddle. Lewis would gain six siblings from his father's second marriage with whom he was very fond of and would regularly correspond. Lewis began his education at Clifton Union School, a four-room schoolhouse, completing first grade through high school. He graduated from the small school in 1887 with three other students. Lewis briefly moved to Santa Ana, California, after his graduation to live with his family, who moved there three years earlier. But this was short lived, as Lewis returned to Ohio in 1890 to attend a university.

== Academic career ==
Lewis’ academic career began with a pursuit of biological sciences from 1890 to 1893 at Wooster College and the completion his Bachelor of Arts degree in biology at the University of Chicago in 1894. For the next three years, Lewis was a biology, histology, and bacteriology assistant in the laboratory at the University of Chicago. During those three years, Lewis would often take courses in anatomy, physiology, paleontology, zoology, geology, and other scientific fields. Lewis accepted a position as a fellow and later as a lecturer in zoology, at the University of Nebraska from 1897 to 1902.

After completing his time in Nebraska, Lewis was accepted as a graduate student at Columbia University to study anthropology. Lewis had worked under Frederick Ward Putnam and Franz Boas in preparing exhibits for the Chicago World's Fair in 1892, as documents in the Putnam Papers at Harvard University Archives reveal. So when Boas began a graduate program in anthropology at Columbia, Lewis was well aware of Boas from his work on exhibits at the World Fair. It is at Columbia University that Lewis became a student of Franz Boaz. Early anthropology courses from Columbia often placed a strong emphasis on material culture as an analytical tool. This emphasis would become a key component in Lewis later life. Lewis's doctoral thesis, ”Tribes of the Columbia Valley and the Coast of Washington and Oregon” was a library study that addressed the culture of a diverse collection of indigenous peoples that had been labeled as a mix of North California and Northwest Pacific slope cultures in terms of local development. Upon the completion of his dissertation, Lewis graduated with a Ph.D. in 1906 from the anthropology program at Columbia University.

Prior to his graduation, George Dorsey, curator and head of the Department of Anthropology at Field Museum of Natural History approached Lewis with the prospect of offering him a job should suitable funding be located. While waiting for Dorsey to find funding Lewis assisted William C. Mills with the excavation of Seip Mound near Bainbridge, Ohio. Having difficulty finding funds and fearful that Lewis would be recruited by some other anthropology department, Dorsey hired Lewis as an assistant, cataloging collections in the museum.

== Time at the Field Museum ==
Lewis arrived at the Field Museum of Natural History in March 1907 after receiving his doctorate in anthropology at Columbia University the previous spring. He was the second student of Franz Boas to be hired by the Field Museum, William Jones, the first Native American to earn an anthropology degree, being the other. A year after his arrival, Lewis was promoted to assistant curator of African and Melanesian ethnology. It is here at the Field Museum that Lewis came to fully appreciate the previous emphasis of material culture that he experienced during his time at Columbia University with Boas. Collecting examples of material culture and their data for the museum was of high significance to Lewis. Lewis's enduring legacy remains the collection of close to 14,000 objects that were acquired during the four-year Joseph N. Field South Pacific Expedition. Lewis would take charge of the expedition from May 1909 until about June 1913. After his return from the exhibition in 1913, Lewis spent the remainder of his time at the Field Museum cataloging collections and preparing exhibits that would demonstrate the areas of cultural diversity in Melanesia. Creating one of the largest and well known exhibits about Melanesia, Lewis opened the Joseph N. Field Hall for display in 1921 and it remained mostly unchanged until its renovation in 1986. He held the position of curator of Melanesian Ethnology at the Field Museum from 1936 up until the time of his death in 1940.

== A. B. Lewis Collection ==
When Dorsey finally found funding to further Lewis anthropological studies for the museum, they resulted in what would be panicle of Lewis’ research: the Joseph N. Field South Pacific Expedition. Joseph N. Field, the older brother to the museum's founder, Marshall Field of the department store chain, endorsed the expedition that led to building blocks of Lewis’ life work. As the leader of the expedition, Lewis and his team left Chicago in May 1909 bound for Fiji. Researching the regions of New Guinea, New Britain, and New Caledonia, Lewis traveled to numerous other areas, amassing an ethnographic collection for the Field Museum unparalleled anywhere in the world.

Not only did Lewis gather over 14,000 objects during his four-year expedition in the South Pacific, but he also created one of the best documented collections of its kind in the world. In an effort to expand the newly formed Field Museum's collection base and establish it as a world-class scientific and educational institution, Lewis created extensive documentation to accompany the artifacts that were shipped back to Chicago. Lewis's collection documentation contains nearly 1,600 surviving expedition photographs, specimen lists documenting items collects, field diaries, and expedition correspondence. Systematically recording information about the objects in his collection, Lewis went beyond typical practices of the time of just noting where objects were made and also documented information such as materials, uses, and local names of objects. The A. B. Lewis collection contains objects from close to 300 communities dispersed through Melanesia. Lewis would go on to view both his immense collection and the experience of the expedition as two of his greatest achievements.

== Major works ==
1906 “Tribes of the Columbia Valley and the Coast of Washington and Oregon” [Ph. D. thesis], Memoirs of the American-Anthropological Association, vol. 1, 147–209

1924 "Block Prints from India for Textiles." Field Museum of Natural History, Anthropology of Design Series, no. 1: Chicago

1924 "Javanese Batik Designs from Metal Stamps." Field Museum of Natural History, Anthropology of Design Series, no. 2: Chicago

1925 "Decorative Art of New Guinea: Incised Designs." Field Museum of Natural History, Anthropology of Design Series, no. 4: Chicago

1929 Melanesian Shell Money in Field Museum Collections. Field Museum of Natural History Publication, no. 268; Anthropological Series, vol. 19, no. 1: Chicago

1931 “Tobacco in New Guinea,” American Anthropologist, vol. 33, 134–138

1931 "Carved and Painted Designs from New Guinea." Field Museum of Natural History, Anthropology of Design Series, no. 5: Chicago

1924 "Ethnology of Melanesia." Field Museum of Natural History, Department of Anthropology, Guide, part 5: Chicago

1988 “New Britain notebook,” Field Museum of Natural History Bulletin, vol. 59, no. 8, 16–23

== Bibliography ==
- Hambly, W. D., 1941. Albert Buell Lewis. American Anthropologist, 43: 256–257.
- Welsch, Robert L., 1991. Lewis, Albert Buell. In: Winters, Christopher, and Michele Calhoun (eds.), International Dictionary of Anthropologists. Compiled by Library- Anthropology Resource Group (LARG): 403–404. New York: Garland Publishing
- Welsch, Robert L., (ed.) 1998. An American Anthropologist in Melanesia: A. B. Lewis and the Joseph N. Field South Pacific Expedition 1909–1913. Vol.1: Field Diaries. Honolulu: University of Hawaii Press.
- Welsch, Robert L. 1999., Historical Ethnology. The Context and Meaning of the A. B. Lewis Collection. Anthropos, Bd. 94, H. 4./6: 447–465
- Welsch, Robert L. 2003. Albert Buell Lewis: Realizing George Amos Dorsey's Vision. Fieldiana. Anthropology, New Series, No. 36, Curators, Collections, and Contexts: Anthropology at the Field Museum, 1893-2002: 99-115
