= Alun Lewis =

Alun Lewis may refer to:

- Alun Lewis (actor) (born 1949), Welsh actor
- Alun Lewis (poet) (1915–1944), poet
- Alun Lewis (rugby union) (born 1956)
- Alun Lewis (swimmer), Welsh swimmer

== See also ==
- Al Lewis (disambiguation)
- Alan Lewis (disambiguation)
- Allan Lewis (disambiguation)
- Allen Lewis (disambiguation)
