= Nisgaʼa and Haida Crest Poles of the Royal Ontario Museum =

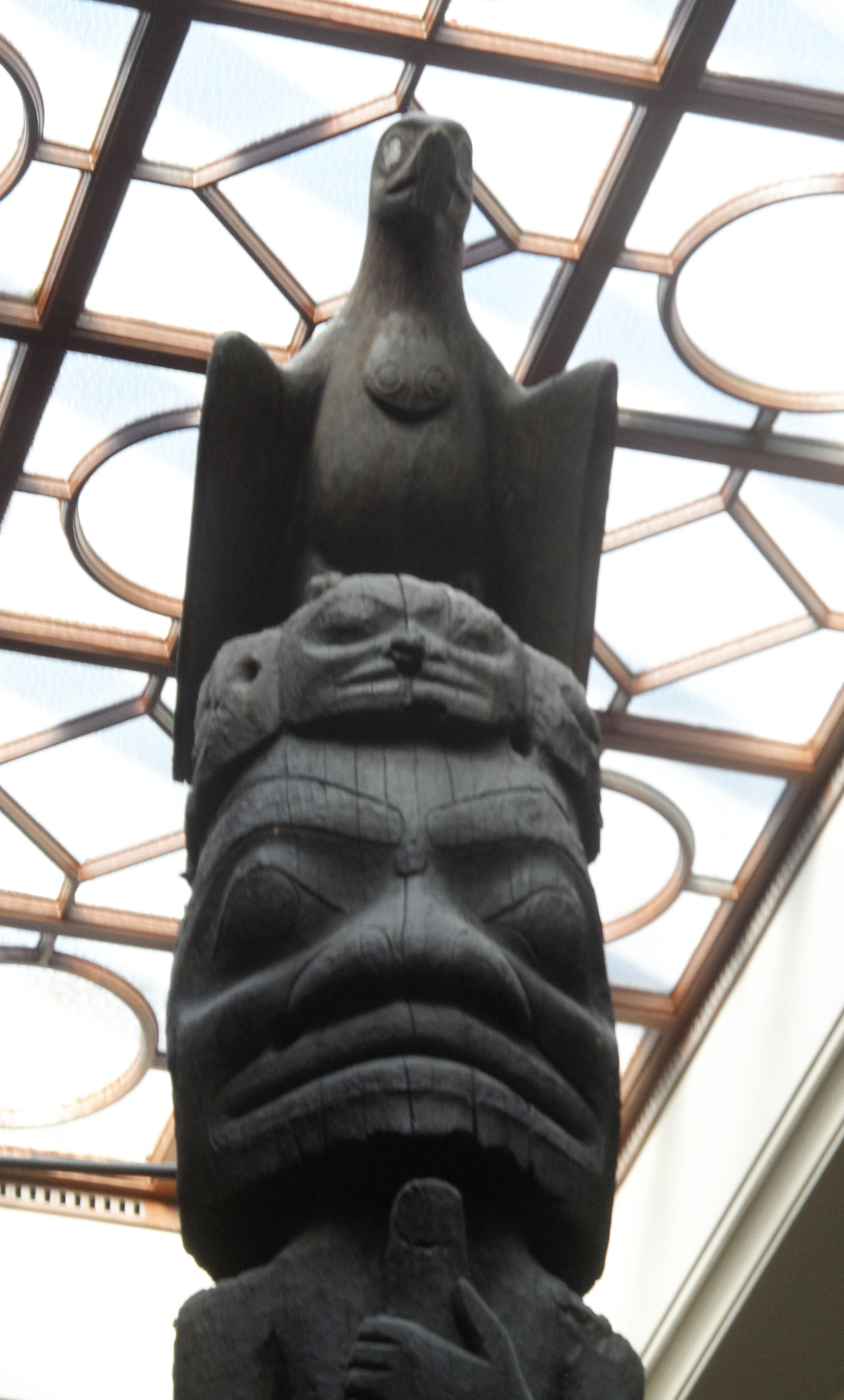
Top Section of Sag̱aw̓een Pole Eagle and Man Underneath

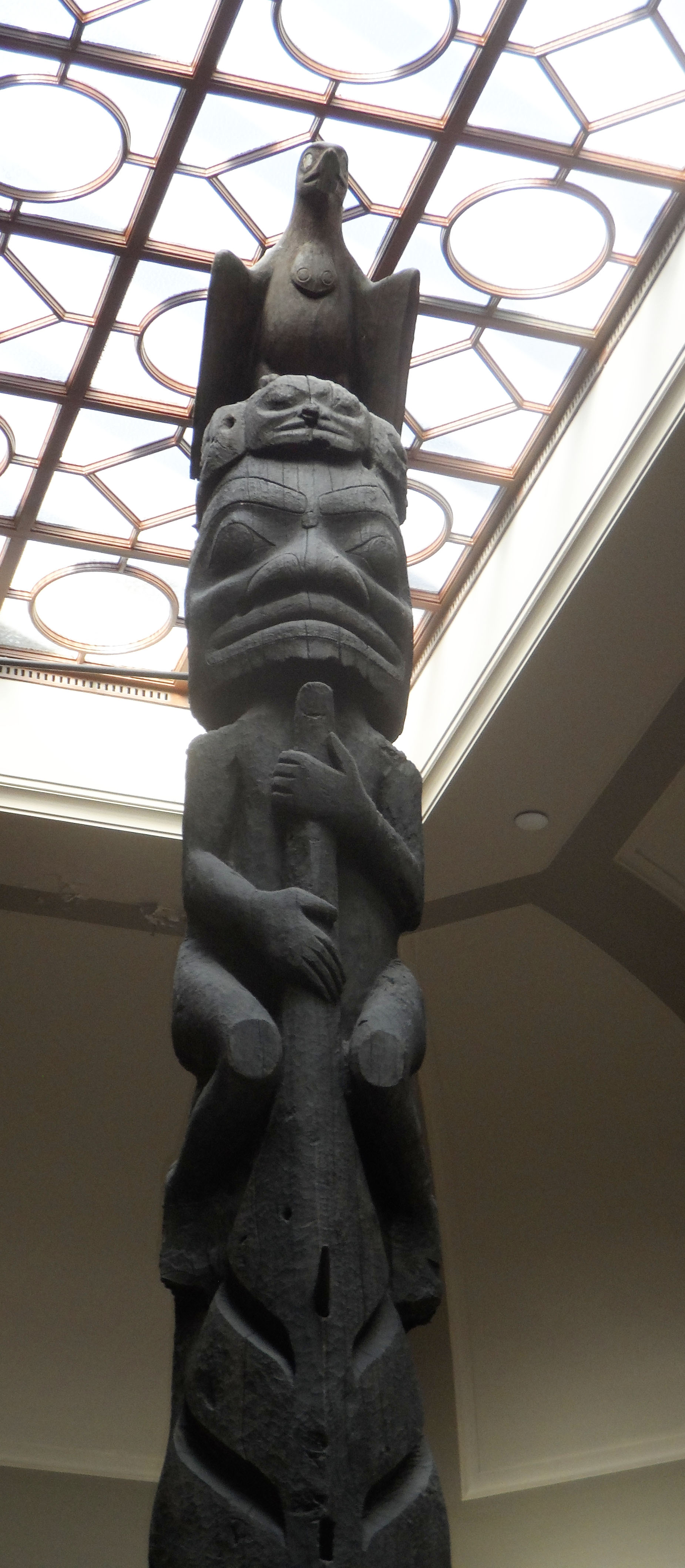
Top and upper section of Sag̱aw̓een Pole Man Underneath and Shark

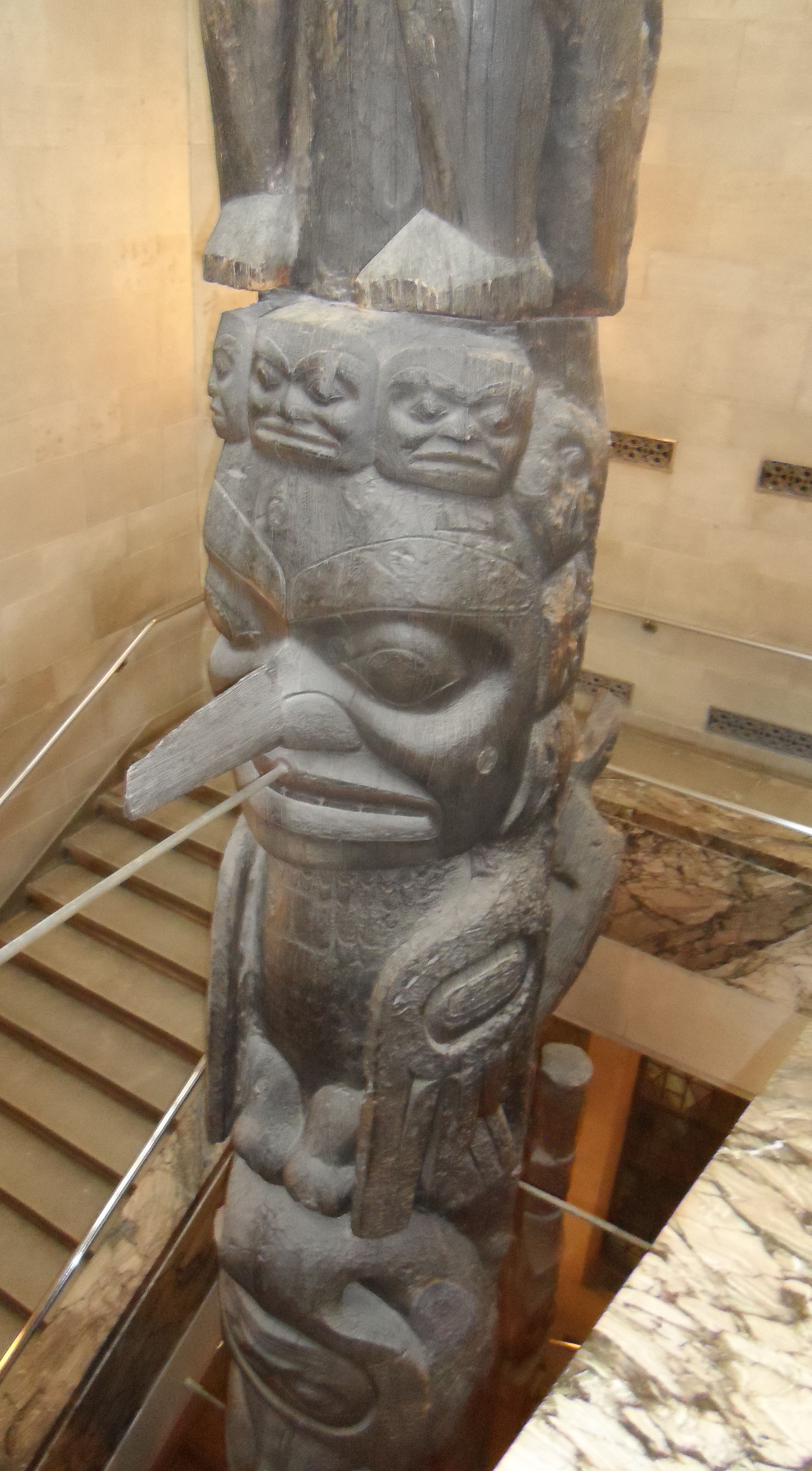
Middle Section Dragonfly

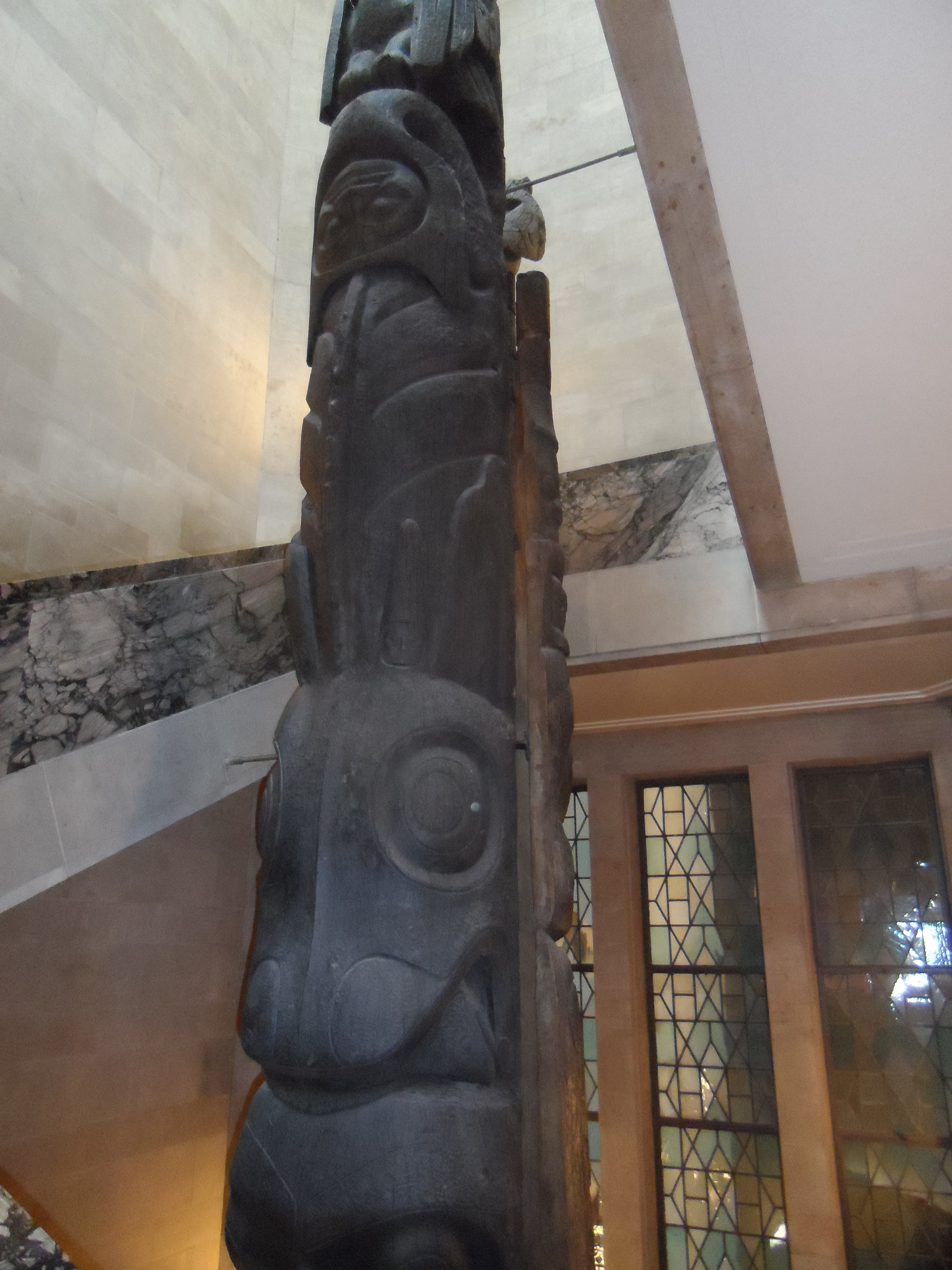
Bullhead Below the Dragonfly

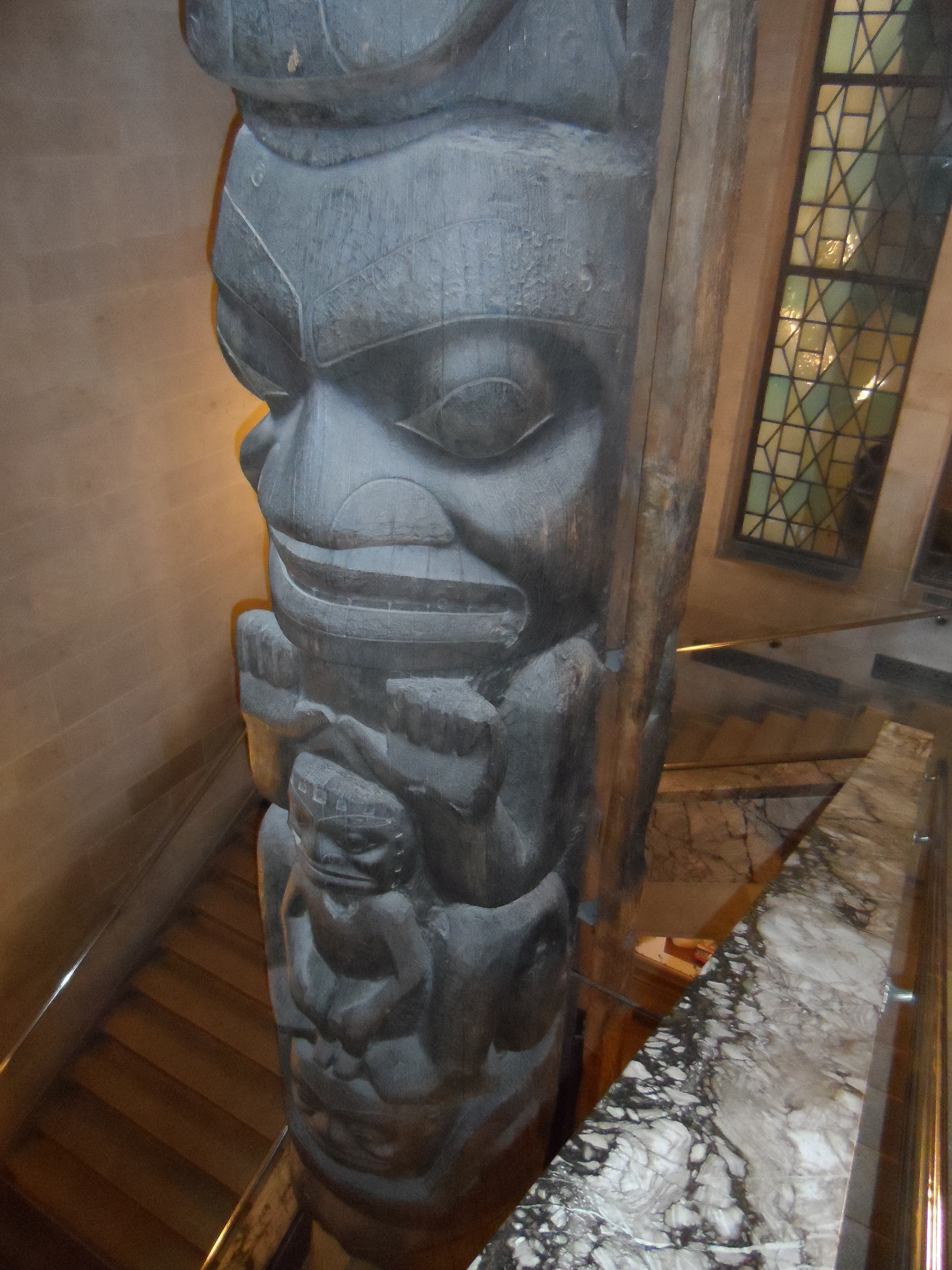
Man named Aitl Below Bullhead and above Man named Guanas

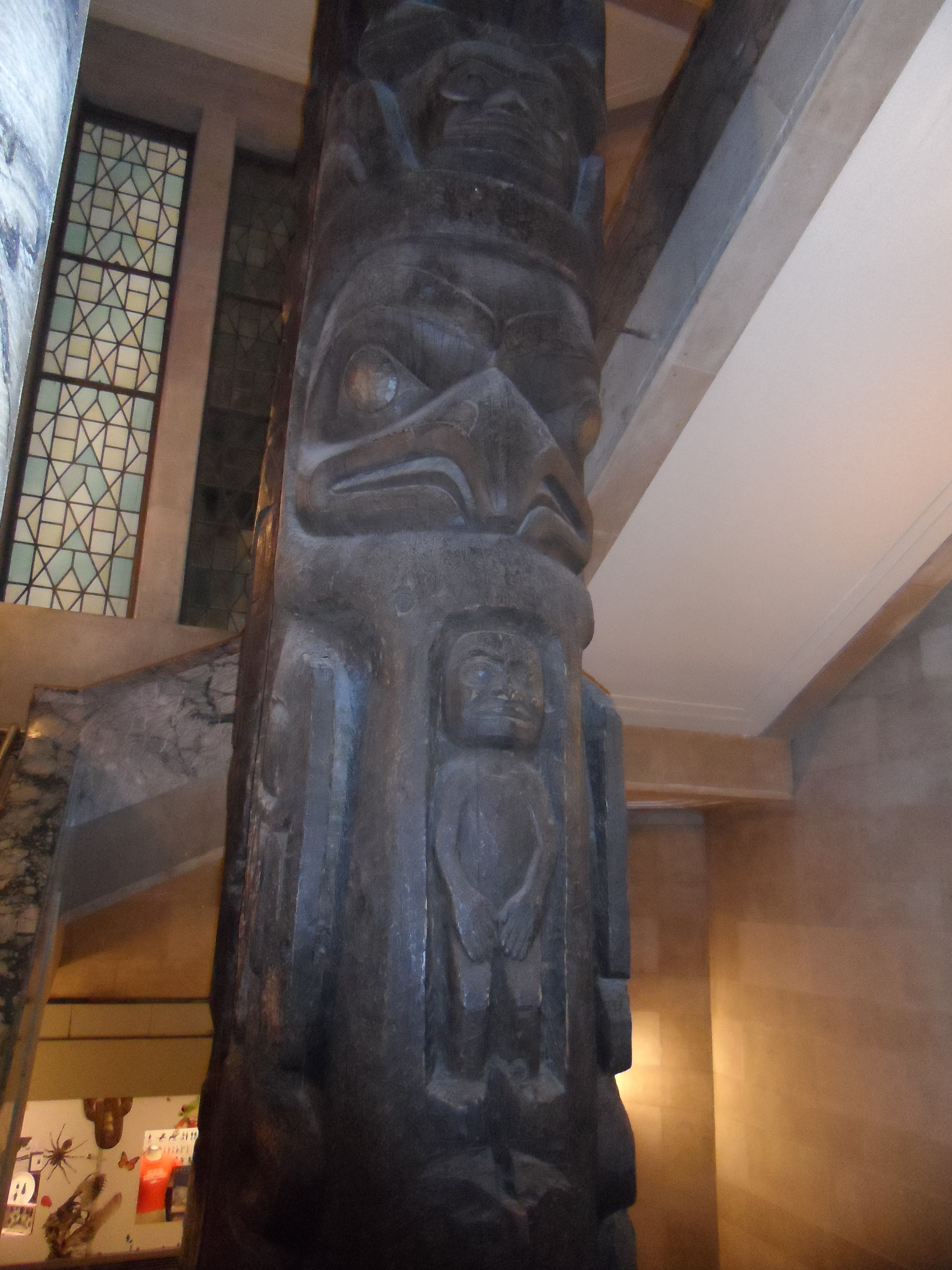
Man named Gunas below Man named Atil and above carving of an Eagle

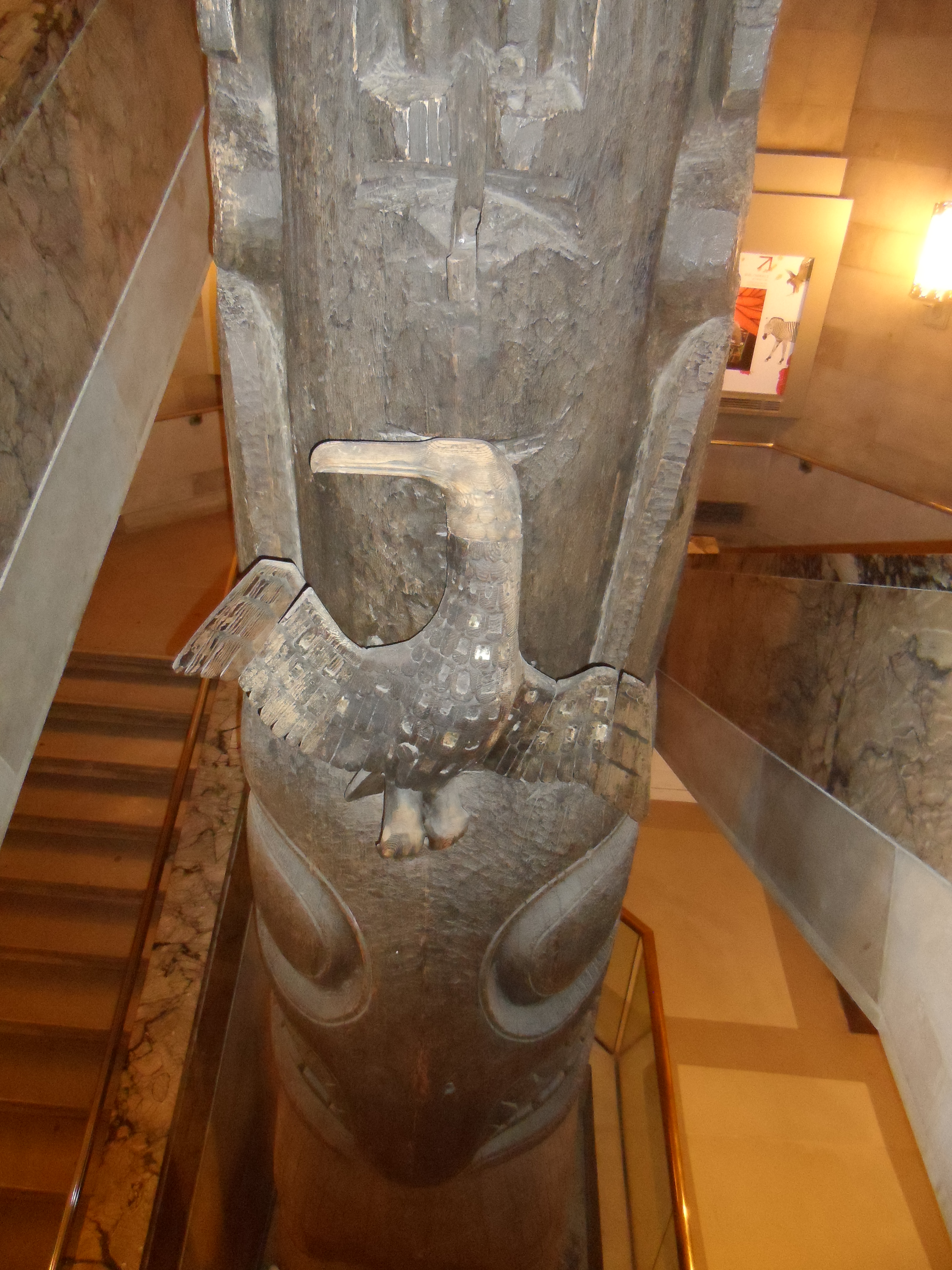
Cormorant (detached carving) below carving of uncle of guanas and above carving of Atil and the Devil fish

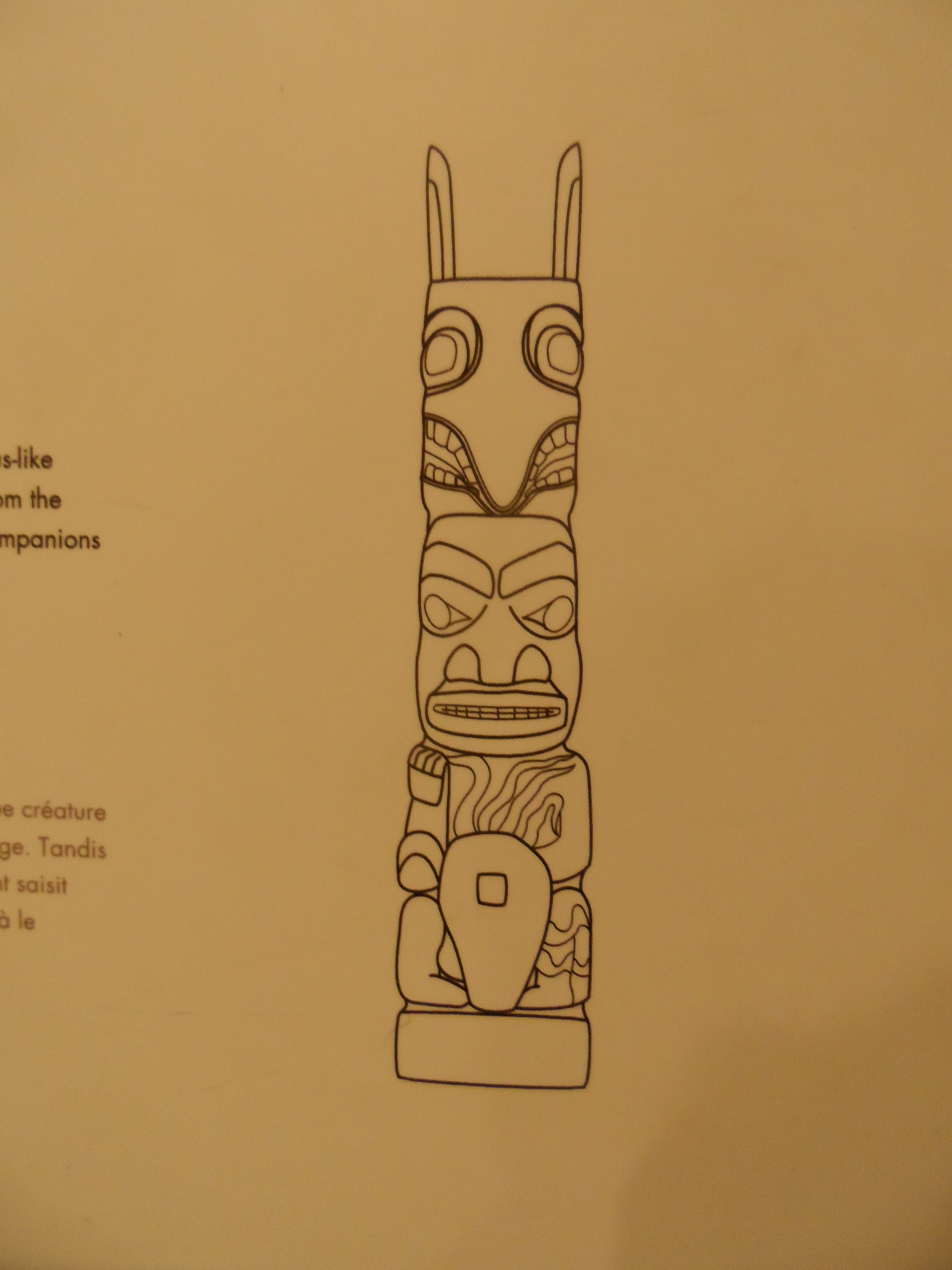
Pole of "Sag̱aw̓een" lower portion Aitl and the Devil Fish

The Nisgaʼa and Haida Crest Poles of the Royal Ontario Museum are a collection of four large totem poles (sometimes referred to as "crest poles"), hand carved from western red cedar by the Nisgaʼa people and Haida people of British Columbia's coast. The poles are referred to as: Three Persons Along (Nisgaʼa); the Pole of Sag̱aw̓een (Nisgaʼa); the Shaking Pole of Kwʼax̱suu (Nisgaʼa); and House 16: Strong House Pole (Haida). Each of the crest poles tell a family story, as carved figures represent crests that commemorate family history by describing family origins, achievements and experiences. These memorial poles were typically placed in front of the owners' house along the beach.

The Nisgaʼa crest poles were acquired by C.M. Barbeau, and the Royal Ontario Museum received them in the early 1920s. However, due to the large size of the poles, they could not be put on display until an expansion of the museum in 1933, when the building could be constructed around them.

Notably, the largest of the four crest poles, the Pole of Sag̱aw̓een, stands over 24.5 metres (80 ft) and is the tallest known example of a pole from the 19th century. The poles can be found in the Royal Ontario Museum, just outside the Daphne Cockwell Gallery of Canada: First Peoples, where the central staircase of the museum winds around them. These crest poles are part of the museum's list of "must-see" iconic objects.

== Three Persons Along (Nisga'a) ==
Three Persons Along is a memorial pole that was carved by Axts'ip, a member of the Fireweed clan, to commemorate Chief Ksim Xsaan of the Raven Tribe. Although technically an unnamed memorial pole, it is often referred to as Three Persons Along in reference to the vertical position of the three human figures carved on the pole. This pole was raised in 1860 and is carved from cedar. It is originally from the village of Gitlaxt’aamiks, Nass River, British Columbia. It was cut down in 1918 and later sold to the Royal Ontario Museum. The pole is 10 metres (33 ft) high.

The figures on the pole (listed from top to bottom) are:

1. Person of Lizards
2. Person of Lizards
3. Person holding Flying Frog

The figures on the pole represent creatures that lived in a shallow lake that was located east of today's village of Gitwinksihlkw. This lake was covered over by lava in a volcanic eruption sometime in the 1700s and no longer exists. Where the lake once existed, is now the Nisga'a Memorial Lava Bed Provincial Park.

Notably, Three Persons Along is one of only three complete poles that was preserved of the 24 poles from the Village of Gitlaxt’aamiks; the rest were reportedly destroyed in the early 20th century.

== Pole of Sag̱aw̓een (Nisga'a) ==
The Pole of Sag̱aw̓een was carved by Oyee to commemorate Chief Sag̱aw̓een from the Eagle tribe (Gitlaxluuks clan). At 81 feet (25 m) tall, this pole is the tallest pole carved on the Nass River. It stood in the village of Gitiks alongside two other Eagle poles: first, the Eagle's Nest Pole, and later in 1885, joined by the Halibut Pole of Laay.

The figures on the pole (listed from top to bottom) are:

1. Eagle (detached carving)
2. Man Underneath
3. Shark
4. Wooden man named Uwait
5. Dragonfly
6. Bullhead
7. Man named Aitl
8. Man named Gunas
9. Eagle
10. Halibut
11. Uncle of Gunas
12. Cormorant (detached carving)
13. Aitl and the Devil Fish

== Shaking Pole of Kw’ax̱suu (Nisga'a) ==
The Shaking Pole was fifth in a series of poles that stood on the beach along the Nass river, just past Ank'idaa. The name Shaking Pole originated from the idea that grizzly bears would shake the pole as they climbed it. This pole was created by two carvers: Oyee and Yarogwanows. The height of the pole is 45 feet (14 m) and was raised in the 1840s. This memorial pole commemorates the female Chief Kw'axsuu from the clan Gitlaxgwanks.

The figures on the pole (listed from top to bottom) are:

1. Prince of Grizzlies
2. Bear Mother
3. Hanging Across
4. Ensnared Grizzly
5. Real Kingfisher (also known as Submerged Person)
6. Running Backwards (later removed)

What is unusual about this pole is that it bears the crests of two different tribes: Wolf and Raven. The top four crests (Prince of Grizzlies, Bear Mother, Hanging Across and Running Backwards) are from the Wolf tribe and the bottom two crests (Real Kingfisher and Running Backwards) are from the Raven tribe. The two tribes are represented at the request of the owner, Chief Kw'axsuu, who wanted both her mother's tribe (Wolf) and her father's tribe (Raven) to be included on this memorial pole.

== House 16: Strong House Pole (Haida) ==
The Haida crest pole is carved from one piece of cedar that is hollowed out at the back. The completion date of this pole is estimated to be 1910. There are three main figures displayed on the pole: a sitting beaver, a killer whale that is missing a dorsal fin and a sitting bear.

The figures on the pole (listed from top to bottom) are:

1. Horned Owl (detached carving)
2. Three Watchmen
3. Eagle
4. Cormorant
5. Killer whale
6. Beaver

The original pole had a separate carved horned owl perched at the very top; the pole no longer has the owl on top. This is a memorial pole to "Prince capsized himself" that was raised by his brother, Nespalas, who wanted his brother's position in the clan.

This pole was collected by Charles F. Newcombe for the Royal Ontario Museum in 1923.
