= Alvin Lewis (Florida State University) =

American academic

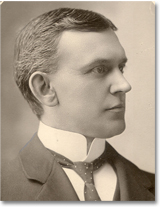

President of Seminary West of the Suwannee River (now named Florida State University)
- In office 1892–1897
- Preceded by: George Edgar
- Succeeded by: Albert A. Murphree

Alvin Lewis was president, between 1892 and 1897, of the Seminary West of the Suwannee River, located in Tallahassee, Florida. This school later changed names several times, and is now Florida State University.
