= Call money =

Minimum short-term loan repayable on demand

In finance, call money is any minimum short-term loan repayable on demand, with a maturity period of one to fourteen days or overnight to a fortnight. It is used for inter-bank transactions. The money that is lent for one day in this market is known as "call money" and, if it exceeds one day, is referred to as "notice money."

Commercial banks have to maintain a minimum cash balance known as the cash reserve ratio. Call money is a method by which banks lend to each other to be able to maintain the cash reserve ratio. The interest rate paid on call money is known as the call rate. It is a highly volatile rate that varies from day to day and sometimes even from hour to hour. There is an inverse relationship between call rates and other short-term money market instruments such as certificates of deposit and commercial paper. A rise in call money rates makes other sources of finance, such as commercial paper and certificates of deposit, cheaper in comparison for banks to raise funds from these sources.

In the international market, the term usually refers to the short-term financing by banking institutions to brokers for maintaining the margin account. It is different from the term "loan" as the schedule for the payment of interest and principal is not fixed. Since the loan can be called at any time, it is riskier than other forms of loans. It helps in meeting liquidity needs at short notice.
