= Bertie Lewis =

British politician

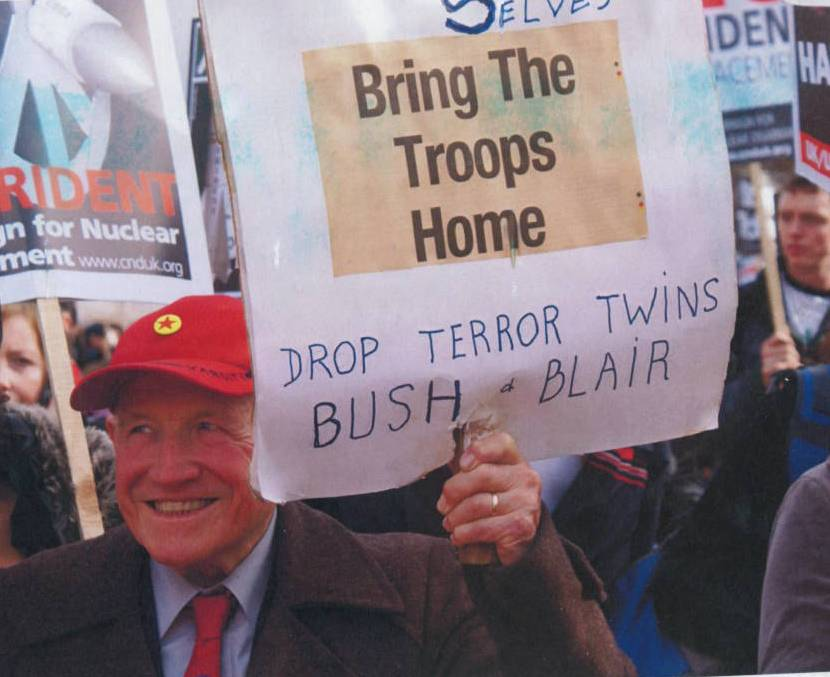
Bertie Lewis marching

Hubert Lewis (22 July 1920 – 21 December 2010) was a World War II RAF airman who went on to become a peace campaigner in the UK. Bertie Lewis became well known for his opposition to nuclear weapons and the wars in which his adopted and his native country were engaged.

== Early life ==
Born Hubert Lewis on 22 July 1920 in Chicago, his childhood years were spent in New York City. At age 15 he ran away from home and travelled the country often on top of freight trains as was typical during the Depression era. Following the outbreak of World War II, while the United States remained a non-belligerent, he went to England and joined the RAF. He served in 102 Squadron of Bomber Command flying 40 operations on Halifax bombers over Germany and France.

After the war he married in Bury, Lancashire moved between there and the US several times before settling in Bolton, Lancashire, in 1961.

== FBI and MI5 surveillance ==
Pages from the FBI file

During the McCarthy era, the FBI kept a constant watch on his movements due to his political views and compiled a large file on him. MI5 collaborated with the FBI when he was living in the UK and kept him under surveillance. Subsequently, British authorities tried to prevent Lewis from returning to the UK but the Royal British Legion helped him retain his residency on the basis of his war service.

== Political activism ==
In 1982 he was expelled by his local branch of the British Legion after he laid a wreath bearing the Campaign for Nuclear Disarmament symbol at the Cenotaph in Bolton on Remembrance Sunday. Lewis said that by opposing nuclear weapons and campaigning for peace he was doing nothing more than following the spirit of the words carved on the base of the Cenotaph in Bolton which read "Our brothers died to win a better world. Our part must be to strive for truth, goodwill and peace that their self sacrifice be not in vain." The national British Legion later ordered his reinstatement following a public outcry and Lewis continued to lay a wreath, often including white poppies each year as part of the official Remembrance Day ceremony until his death in 2010.

He was a member of Ex-Services CND and always took part in their August vigil in memory of the victims of the atomic bombing of Hiroshima and Nagasaki. For many years he held a weekly vigil on the town hall square of his home town of Bolton on issues of the day regarding war and peace and social justice. He was also a member of Bolton Socialist Club which opened in 1905 and is the oldest remaining independent socialist club in the UK.

He attended many protests during his life including the famous 1968 demonstration against the Vietnam War that ended in violence outside the US Embassy in Grosvenor Square, London. During the visit of President Ronald Reagan to London in 1984 Lewis managed to take his message inside the U.S. Embassy while thousands protested outside against the deployment of American cruise missiles on British soil. Lewis also joined the one-million-strong Stop the War demonstration in London in February 2003 just before the invasion of Iraq. At age 89 he was the oldest member of the group Military Families Against the War delivering a petition to 10 Downing Street calling for British servicemen and women to be brought home from Afghanistan. His last demonstration in London was in May 2010 against the Israeli attack on the flotilla bringing supplies to the stricken people of Gaza.

In 1990 he was involved in a scuffle with another guest on the TV show UpFront whilst discussing the war in the Balkans.

In 2010 aged 90 there was controversy after he was knocked down by riot police at a demo against the English Defence League.

Lewis died on 21 December 2010 following a hip replacement operation in the Royal Bolton Hospital.

A flagstone laid as a lasting tribute to Bertie was unveiled by the mayor of Bolton on 1 August 2015. At the ceremony Lewis was described as "a true internationalist who made his home in our town". The plaque reads "Bertie Lewis – Fighter for Peace and Social Justice".

== Personal life ==
Lewis married his first wife, Britain-born Mary Crausby, in 1945 and had three children Edward, Denzil, and John. From his first marriage he also had six grandchildren, Alan, Garry, Ady, Mark, Lindsey and Jodie. He also had six great-grandchildren, Abigail, Jack, Dylan, Georgia, Robin, Ava and Max. He married Austria-born Amalia Toth in 1961 and had two more boys Roger and David.

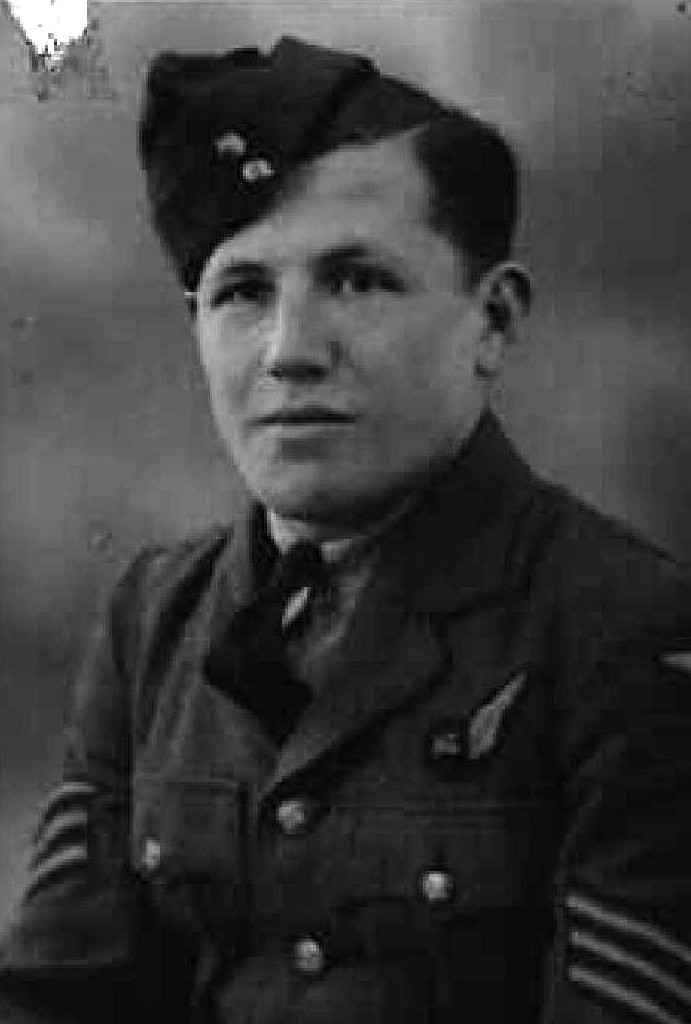
Bertie Lewis

== See also ==
- List of peace activists
