= James Deans =

Scottish ethnologist, guide and collector

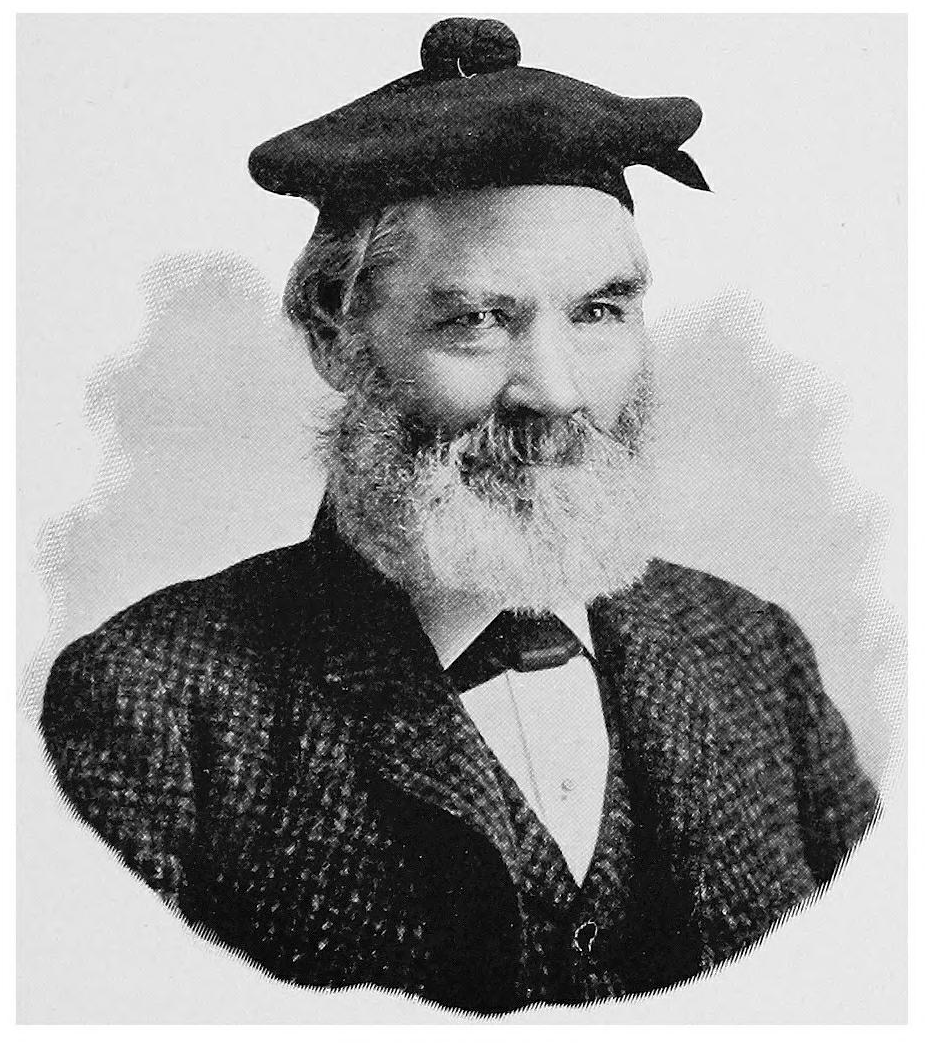

James Deans (1827-1905) was a Scottish ethnologist, guide and collector of Victoria, British Columbia, who published several works on the folklore and culture of the Indigenous peoples of the Americas.

Deans was born on 17 June, 182, in Aimisfield, Haddingtonshire, Scotland. He moved to Victoria, British Columbia, in 1853, alongside his brother, George, and George's wife, Annie.

Deans joined James Richardson's expedition to survey Queen Charlotte Islands in 1878, and he was employed by others as a local guide; his collection of ethnographic materials was criticised by some contemporaries for its insensitivity. He presented an exhibition on the Haida people at the World's Columbian Exposition, showing a model village based on materials he had obtained. Amongst his works is a paper presented at "The Chicago Folk-Lore Congress of 1893", "The Superstitions, Customs, and Burial Rites of the Tribes of North-Western America".
