= Old Witch totem pole =

Totem pole in Juneau, Alaska

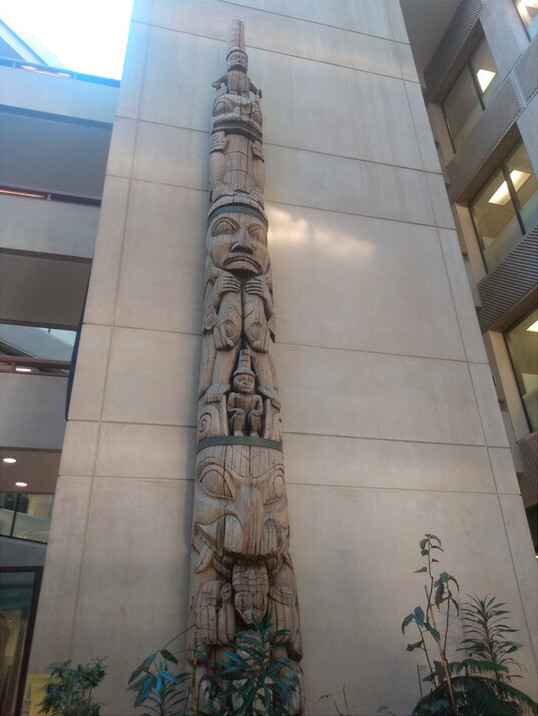
- Artist: Dwight Wallace Haida: gid kʼwáajuss
- Year: c. 1880
- Location: 58.3010°N 134.4114°W
- Owner: Alaska State Museum

The Old Witch or Wasgo totem pole (Note: also spelt Waasgo) is a Kaigani Haida totem pole in Juneau, Alaska. Carved c. 1880 by Dwight Wallace and originally erected in Sukkwan, a village on Prince of Wales Island, the totem pole was moved to Juneau in the 1920s after it was purchased by Dr. Robert Simpson, and installed outside his and his wife's gift shop. The Simpson family donated the pole to the City of Juneau in the 1940s, who installed it outside the Juneau Memorial Library in 1954. After a 1969 survey found that the pole had been damaged from its life outdoors, the city took it down in 1970 and moved it inside. They loaned, and later gave, the Old Witch pole to the State of Alaska, where it forms part of the Alaska State Museum collection. The state installed the totem pole inside the atrium of the State Office Building in 1977.

== History ==
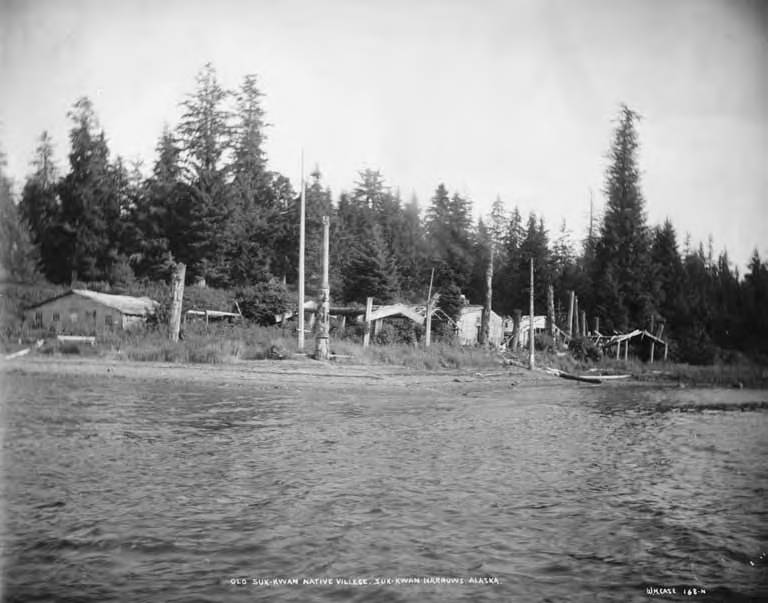
Sukkwan village c. 1908, with totem poles visible

The Old Witch totem pole was carved c. 1880 by Dwight Wallace (Haida: gid kʼwáajuss), a Raven Kaigani Haida man from Klinkwan. According to Emily Moore in Proud Raven, Panting Wolf, Wallace was "recognized as one of the most important Kaigani Haida carvers of the nineteenth century". Wallace's son, John Wallace, has also attributed the pole to his farther; the Old Witch pole contains the flat lower eyelids, a characteristic of Wallace's work. According to Edward L. Keithahn, in the 1945 Monuments in Cedar, John Wallace assisted his father in carving the totem.

The totem pole was erected in front of the house of the Quit’aas clan chief in Sukkwan (Haida: saxqʼwa.áan), a Haida village on Prince of Wales Island. In the early twentieth century (by 1926), the pole was purchased by Robert Simpson, an optometrist from Juneau whose work took him to rural Alaska. Simpson and his wife, Belle, ran the Nugget Shop: a curio and gift shop on South Franklin Street. They kept it and several other totem poles outside the shop, until the Nugget Shop was moved to Seward Street.

In the 1940s, after the Nugget Shop moved, the Old Witch pole was donated to the city of Juneau. Sources conflict as to who donated the pole; art historians Aldona Jonaitis and Robin Wright state that the pole was donated to the city by Robert Simpson. The Juneau Empire states the pole was donated by Belle Simpson, after Robert's death. It was kept in storage at the Juneau Subport; in 1954, the city announced that, with a budget of US$1,000 (equivalent to $11,989 in 2025) it would restore the pole and install it at the Juneau Memorial Library.

In 1969, a survey was conducted that found the pole had deteriorated from being left outside the library; damaged by the weather, surveyors believed the pole was going to fall down and could, in all likelihood, not be mounted in a self-supported manner again. The pole was also believed by the Alaska State Museum to pose a safety hazard. So, after sixteen years standing by the library, the pole was removed in February, 1970 and permanently loaned the state museum.

By 1985, the pole had been formally given to the State of Alaska by the city of Juneau, on the agreement that it would always stay in Juneau; according to the Juneau Empire, the pole was traded in exchange for Amos Wallace's Harnessing the Atom, which replaced Old Witch outside the Juneau library. After a year of drying, employees of the Alaska State Museum began restoring the Old Witch pole in 1972, in preparation for a move to the museum. They removed the remnants of paint that had been applied during the 1930s; they did not attempt to replicate the original colours and re-paint the pole or add wood preservatives, both because the pole was going inside and because they did not feel they could accurately replicate the original colours.

In 1976, the pole was moved to the State Office Building by the Division of Libraries and Museums of the Department of Education, the US Coast Guard, and a local branch of the International Union of Operating Engineers. It was installed to stand in the eighth-floor lobby of the State Office Building's atrium the March 12 on the next year. A dedication ceremony, with people such as Belle Simpson, Alfred Widmark, Bill Overstreet, and Lowell Thomas Jr. in attendance, was held April 29, 1977.

In 2022, a Tlingit totem pole previously installed outside Centennial Hall, the Wooshkeetaan Kootéeyaa, was taken inside installed alongside the Old Witch pole.

== Description ==
The Old Witch pole is 38 feet tall, weighs 1,500 pounds, and is carved from yellow cedar. It depicts the Wasgo, a sea-wolf who appears in Haida legends and is said to bring wealth and power to those who encounter it. In the 1950 Totem Pole, Canadian ethnographer Marius Barbeau identified the top figure as a sitting human, the third figure from the top as Fog Woman holding salmon, and the bottom figure as a bear with two cubs. The story told by the pole is a confrontation between a man and his mother-in-law. It was called the "Old Witch Pole" by Edward L. Keithahn, who described it in 1945 as a "fine Haida pole".

According to Aldona Jonaitis the Old Witch pole has represented "three types of wealth, and thus three sources of power, during the phases of its life history": when standing in the State Office Building, when standing outside a chief's house, when standing outside the Simpson's shop. In the first half of the nineteenth century, the Simpsons belonged to a powerful local family; one of Belle Simpson's brothers owned a department store, and another was Isadore Goldstein, a mayor in Juneau).

At the State Office Building, the pole is surrounded by plants; two plaques give its history. It has catalogue number 11-B-1632 in the Alaska State Museum's collection.

== See also ==
- List of totem poles

== Sources ==
=== Bibliography ===
- Keithahn, Edward L. (1963) [1945]. Monuments in Cedar. Bonanza Books. pp. 26, 74, 146.
- Wright, Robin Kathleen (2001). Northern Haida master carvers. Seattle : Vancouver: University of Washington Press ; Douglas & McIntyre. ISBN 978-0-295-98084-3.
