= Three Frogs pole =

Totem pole formerly in Wrangell, Alaska

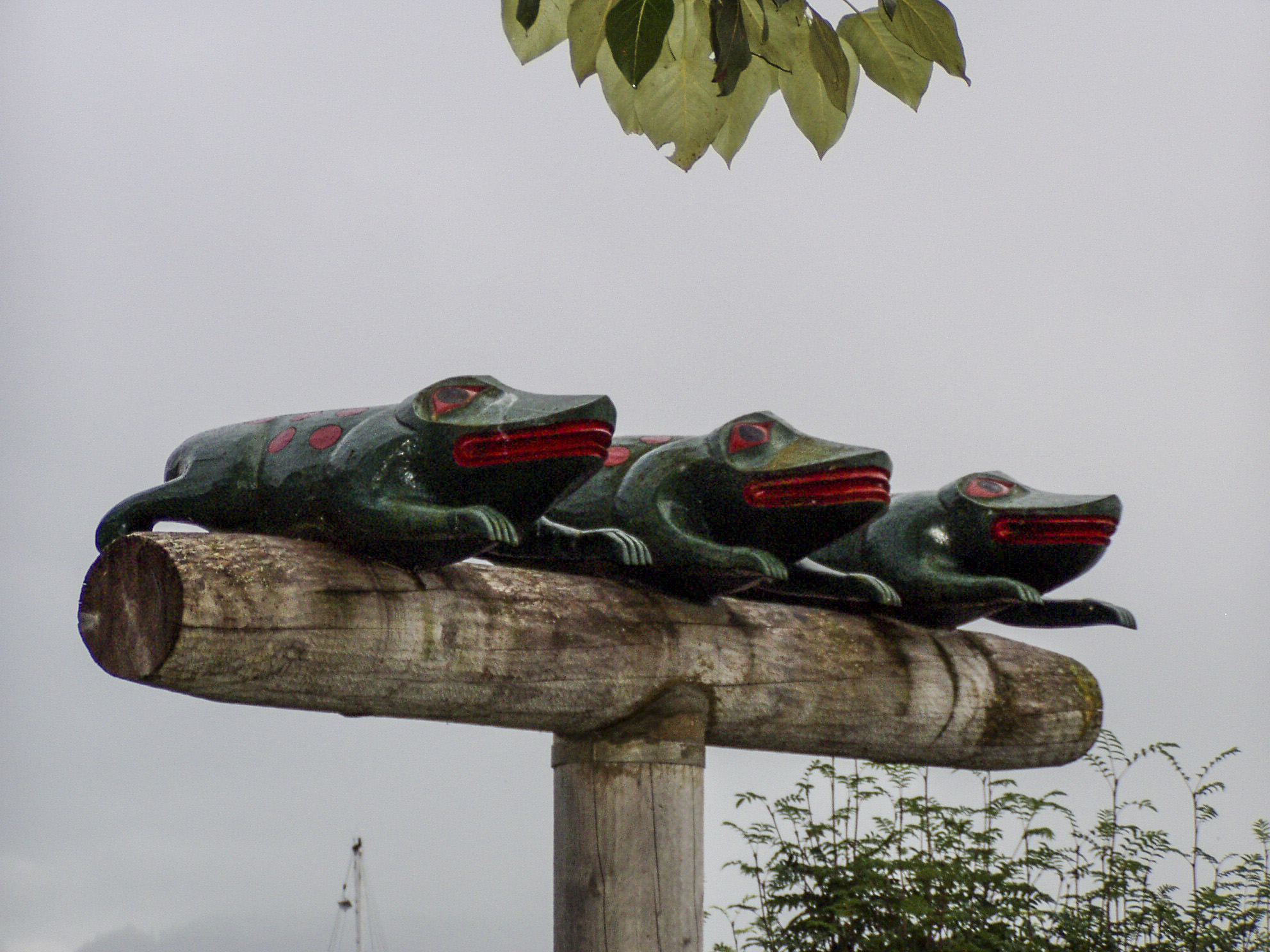
- Third iteration of the totem pole, in 2003
- Year: 1800s (original) 1940 (first replica) c. 2000 (second replica)
- Subject: Three Kiks.ádi Tlingit women
- Location: Chief Shakes Historic Site; Wrangell, Alaska, United States

The Three Frogs pole, also called the Three-Frog totem, was a totem pole originally made by the Naanyaa.aayí Tlingit clan. A ridicule pole meant to shame three women from another Tlingit clan, the Three Frogs pole was originally made in the 19th century. After it deteriorated, a replica based on old photos was made by the Civilian Conservation Corps (CCC) on the order of Linn A. Forrest in 1939 and 1940. This replica was controversial amongst the Tlingit community in Alaska; after a shame pole has deteriorated, the debt is considered to be forgotten. However, the parks service persisted and the totem pole was installed at the CCC-built Chief Shakes Historic Site in Wrangell in 1940. It was vandalized in the 1980s and a third replica was built; this final replica was removed in 2024 at a ceremony attended by people from both clans.

From the 1970s until the pole's removal, it was used by the newspaper The Wrangell Sentinel in their branding.

== Creation ==
The original Three Frogs pole was created during the late 1800s, commissioned by a chief of the Naanyaa.aayí Tlingit clan. A ridicule pole, the totem pole was meant to shame the Kiks.ádi clan for an unpaid debt. Three Kiks.ádi women married three slaves in the Naanyaa.aayí clan household; as such, the Naanyaa.aayí Chief Shakes demanded that the Kiks.ádi clan pay for the women's housing. However, the Kiks.ádi clan chief maintained that by marrying the slaves, the three women were no longer the responsibility of the Kiks.ádi and were disavowed. As such, Chief Shakes commissioned the pole to shame the clan; as the Kiks.ádi clan crest is a frog, the three frogs on top represented the three women. According to Kiks.ádi clan mother Katherine Geroge-Byrd, in 2024, the three women were originally meant to marry a Naanyaa.aayí chief's sons, but ran away to marry slaves instead.

According to Edward L. Keithahn, he did not know if the debt was ever repaid but, according to a widely accepted version of the story told in the 1940s, it was not and the totem pole was left to decay. According to Emily L. Moore in Proud Raven, Panting Wolf, many Tlingit people maintained that the debt had been paid.

== Description and location ==
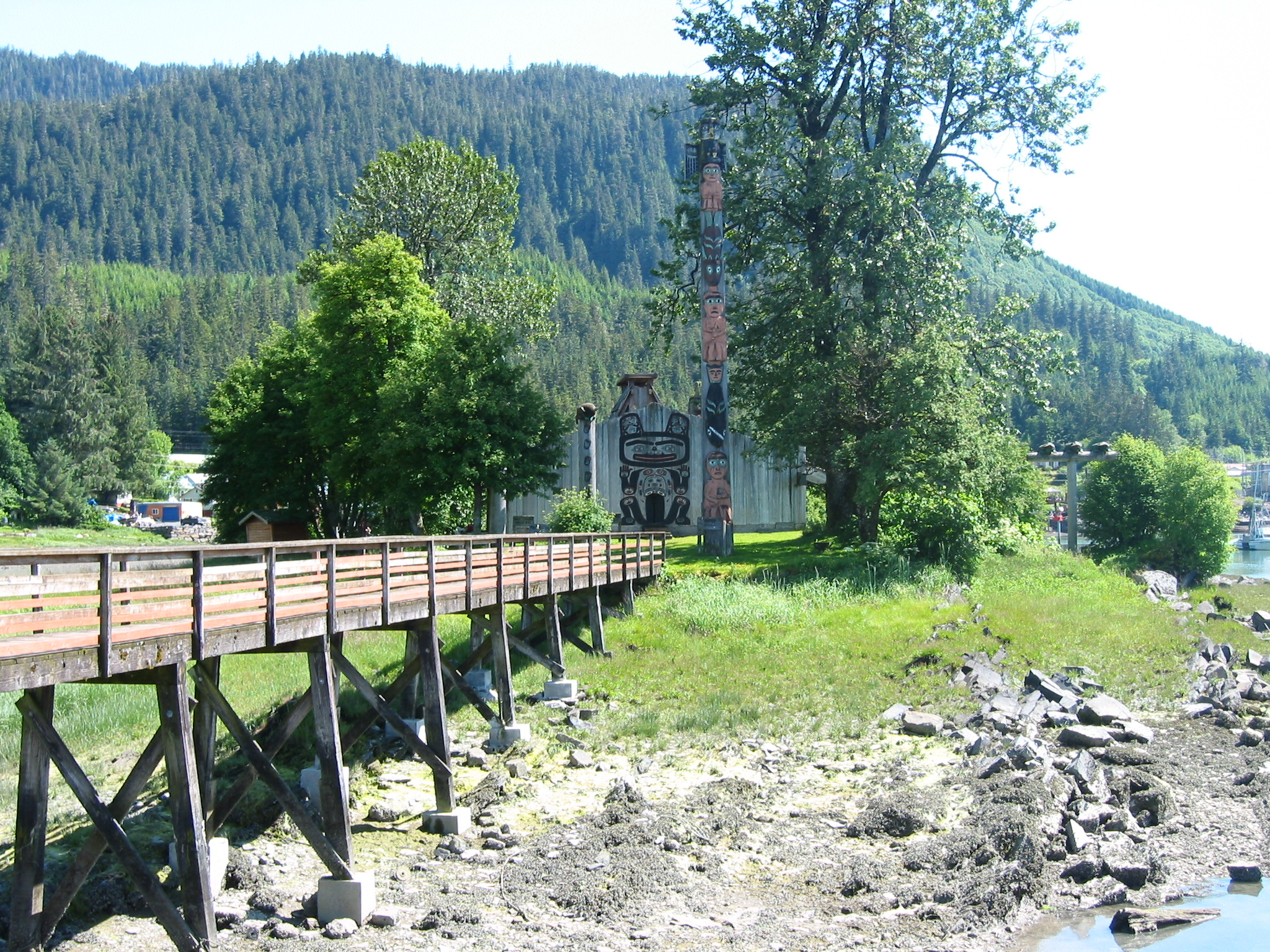
The Chief Shakes Tribal House; the Three Frogs pole is visible on the right

The totem pole was largely plain. A bar stretches horizontally across the top, on which were perched three frogs. The Save Outdoor Sculpture! documented the 1940 replica; they recorded that it was made from cedar and painted white and green. The frogs perched on top of the crossbar had white spots and no two frogs were exactly the same.

Located at the Chief Shakes Historic Site on Shakes Island, the totem pole was the responsibility of the Wrangell Cooperative Association.

== History of replicas ==
The first replica of the totem pole was carved in 1939 and 1940. Carved by Joe Thomas, Thomas Ukas, William Tamaree, and Phillip Kelly of the Civilian Conservation Corps under the orders of Linn A. Forrest, Forrest wanted the totem pole to be an exact copy of the original. This proved controversial amongst the Tlingit people, especially those of the Kiks.ádi clan; once a shame pole had rotted away, it was expected that whatever debt or offense had incurred its creation would be forgotten. By recreating a shame pole, Forrest had gone against this practice and, as a result, his was not viewed as authentic. According to Edward L. Keithahn, people threatened to remove the pole if it were installed, but Forrest and the Forest Service went ahead, despite these objections. The pole was dedicated on June 3 and 4, 1940 and installed by the Chief Shakes Tribal House at the Chief Shakes Historic Site in Wrangell.

On one night in September, 1985, the Three Frogs pole was vandalized and two frogs removed. A replica was carved by Ernie Smeltzer of Ketchikan in the late 1900s, and was re-installed around the year 2000 by the Wrangell Cooperative Association. Smeltzer based his replica on the CCC's 1940 reconstruction, which he described as "nearly pulverized" was the vandalism. It took him three months to carve each replacement frog. The possibility of replacing the totem pole was met with some resistance at the time of the vandalism; Marge Byrd of the Kiks.ádi clan spoke against repairing or rebuilding the totem pole due to its history as a ridicule pole. The Bureau of Indian Affairs was required to keep the Chief Shakes Site, including the Thee Frog pole, the same over the years.

The Three Frogs pole was removed in a ceremony on September 6, 2024. Members of the Kiks.ádi and Naanyaa.aayí clans attended the ceremony and spoke against the replicas which had been installed over the years. People sang and held cedar branches as the totem pole was pulled down with ropes and left on the ground. Kiks.ádi clan mother Katherine Geroge-Byrd announced that the three frogs would be cremated and another representative of the Kiks.ádi thanked the Naanyaa.aayí clan, saying: "We very much appreciate everything you have done". Representatives of both clans announced then that they no longer wished to speak of the Three Frogs pole.

=== Use in The Wrangell Sentinel ===
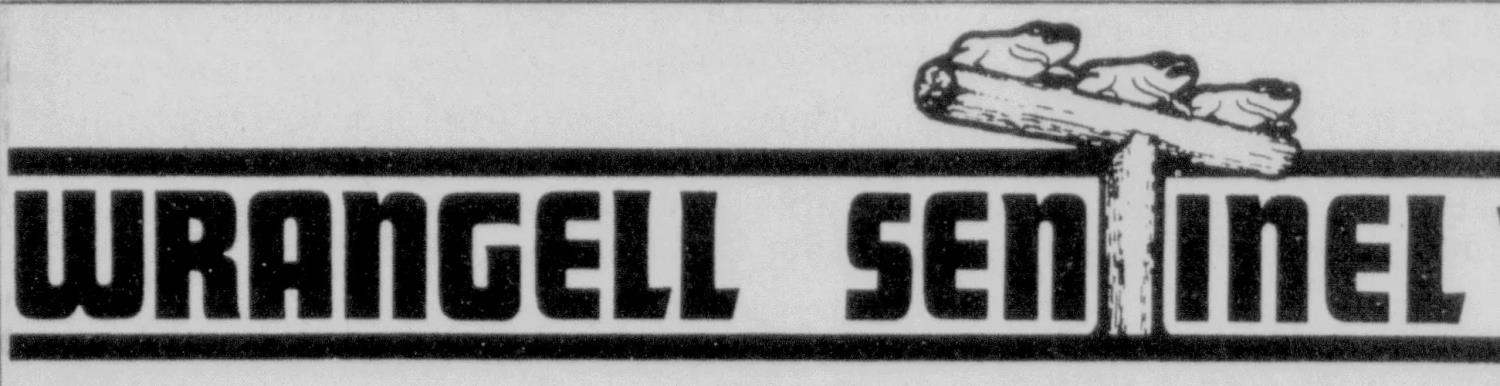
The Wrangell Sentinel masthead in 1985

Starting in the 1970s, The Wrangell Sentinel newspaper began using the totem pole as part of its branding, incorporating it into its "masthead, website and logos". The Sentinel is a non-Alaska Native business and, as such, Jonathan Meuli asked if the paper's choice to use an Alaska Native ridicule pole could be interpreted as "subtly transmuting those original connotations of sexual and/or 'property' shaming into connotations of ethnic shaming?"

When the Three Frogs pole was vandalised in 1985, the Sentinel responded by updating their masthead to remove two frogs; the paper said they would leave the other frogs off until such a time as the totem pole was repaired. The Sentinel announced it would discontinue its use of the totem pole in their imagery after its removal in 2024.

== See also ==
- List of totem poles

== Sources ==
=== Bibliography ===
- Moore, Emily L. (2018). Proud raven, panting wolf: carving Alaska's New Deal totem parks. Seattle: University of Washington Press. ISBN 978-0-295-74393-6. Full access available to users of The Wikipedia Library.
