= George Aden Ahgupuk =

Eskimo artist

- Twok
- Born: October 8, 1911; Shishmaref, Alaska
- Died: April 1, 2001 (aged 89); Alaska
- Website: ahgupuk.com

George Aden Ahgupuk (October 8, 1911–April 1, 2001), also called Twok (Tuwaaq in the Modern Iñupiaq orthography), was an Eskimo-American artist known for his paintings and drawings of Inupiaq life. In addition to works on paper, Ahgupuk created ink-wash artwork on various surfaces, such as bleached walrus skin and caribou hide. He was one of the first Eskimo artists to make drawings instead of traditional ivory engraving. Ahgupuk's work is the permanent collection of institutions including the National Museum of the American Indian, the Smithsonian National Portrait Gallery, the Alaska State Museum, the University of Alaska Museum, and the Anchorage Museum of History and Art.

== Early life ==
Ahgupuk was born on October 8, 1911, in Shishmaref, Alaska, at the northwestern tip of the Seward Peninsula. His Inupiaq name, Twok, means "man" (Tuwaaq in modern Inupiaq orthography) . His father was a fisherman, and Ahgupuk grew up in a one-room sod igloo. As a child, Ahgupuk attended a government-sponsored school in Noorvik where his brother Ben was a teacher. He did not care much for reading, but enjoyed drawing pictures.

In 1930, Ahgupuk traveled 200 miles by dog team to visit the nearest dentist, in Nome, Alaska. On his way home, he camped near Cape Prince of Wales and hunted for ptarmigan. While hunting, Ahgupuk slipped and fell down a steep hill, breaking his leg against some boulders. As medical care was scarce, the broken leg was untreated and bothered him until 1934. At that time, an Office of Indian Affairs nurse urged him to seek further care.

At the Indian Service hospital, it was discovered that Ahgupuk was suffering from a tuberculosis infection of the bone. He was admitted to the hospital and spent six months recovering. During that visit, he occupied himself by drawing on some toilet paper, the only available drawing surface. A nurse named Nan Gallagher was impressed with his art and purchased some paper and crayons for him, commissioning some Christmas cards for pay. Other nurses and doctors soon purchased his work, and Ahgupuk was able to return home with $10 earned from his artwork.

== Career ==
Realizing he could make a living from his artwork, Ahgupuk began creating more prolifically. He also developed a proprietary technique for bleaching caribou hides for his purposes. By 1936, he had attracted widespread attention; in particular the artist Rockwell Kent championed Ahgupuk's artwork in publications including The New York Times and Time. Commercial publishers began to purchase his work for mass reproduction, including for Christmas cards.

In the 1940s, Ahgupuk was asked to illustrate a collection of stories for the United States Indian Service called Igloo Tales, written by Edward L. Keithahn. He would go on to illustrate other books about Alaskan life.

In 1955, both of Ahgupuk's arms were badly burned in a fire, and doctors grafted skin from his legs onto his arms. However, by the end of 1955, he wrote that he was able to return to drawing.

=== Artistic style ===
Ahgupuk's illustrations utilize ink wash shading combined with thick outlined subjects. His subject matter typically included coastal village scenes, people fishing and hunting, dog teams, and northern animals.

== Works as illustrator ==
- Igloo Tales by Edward L. Keithahn, 1945 ISBN 088240038X
- The Last Frontier: A Short History of Alaska by Ben Adams
- I Am Eskimo, Aknik My Name, by Paul Green (Aknik), 1959 ISBN 0882400010
