= Wooshkeetaan Kootéeyaa and Áakʼw Kootéeyaa =

Pair of totem poles in Juneau, Alaska

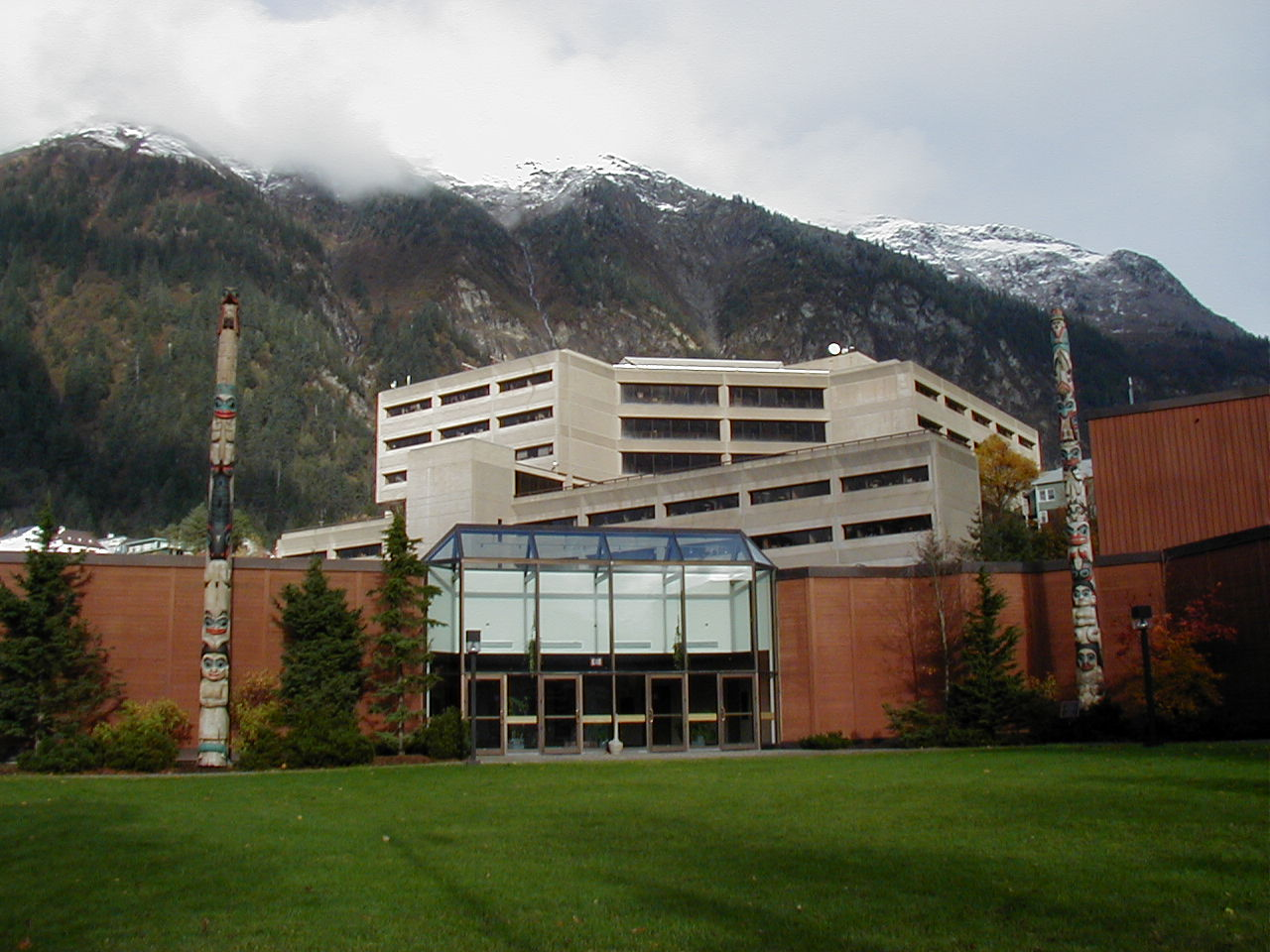
- Áakʼw Kootéeyaa (left) and the Wooshkeetaan Kootéeyaa (right) front of Centennial Hall and the State Office Building in 2001
- Artists: Nathan Jackson with Dorica Jackson and Steve Brown
- Year: 1980 and 1981
- Medium: Red cedar
- Location: Juneau, Alaska, US
- Owner: Juneau-Douglas City Museum

The Wooshkeetaan Kootéeyaa (Note: Also spelt Wooshe-Ke-Tan, or Wooshketan.) and the Áakʼw Kootéeyaa (Note: Also known as the Auke totem pole or the Auk Tribe totem pole.) are a pair of totem poles in Juneau, Alaska. Commissioned for the city's 1980 centennial, the poles represent the Wooshkeetaan Clan and the Raven Clan, opposing moieties of the Áakʼw Kwáan people. The Wooshkeetaan Kootéeyaa depicts the United States government, in the form of Uncle Sam, as a reminder that the government had not apologized (at the time of carving of the pole) for the 1882 Angoon bombardment, when a Tlingit village was shelled by the Navy.

The two poles were carved by Nathan Jackson, with assistance from his wife, Dorica Jackson, and Steve Brown. Designs were created in collaboration with Tlingit elders. Work on the Wooshkeetaan Kootéeyaa began in 1980 and took six weeks; work on the Áakʼw Kootéeyaa took place the following year. Both poles were installed in 1983 at Centennial Hall in Juneau. Over time, they began to deteriorate. Though restoration efforts were made in 2000, the Áakʼw Kootéeyaa was removed in 2003 on the advice of Jackson and re-installed at the Juneau-Douglas High School. The Wooshkeetaan Kootéeyaa was removed in 2016 for safety and preservation concerns; it remained in storage until 2021, when it was installed in the atrium of the State Office Building.

== Description ==
Both poles are 40 feet (12 m) tall and made from western redcedar. The cedar was harvested in Wrangell. Both poles are Tlingit, and their designs were based on discussions carver Nathan Jackson had with Auk and Angoon elders.

=== Wooshkeetaan Kootéeyaa ===
The Wooshkeetaan Kootéeyaa is named for the Wooshkeetaan clan, an Eagle/Wolf clan. Its design was created after consultation with Angoon leader George Jim, Sr. (Tlingit: Yaanashtúk). Based on the history of the Wooshkeetaan Clan, the pole was originally slated to have 13 designs; this was simplified by Nathan Jackson to just eight (from top to bottom): Uncle Sam, a shark/dogfish, a murrelet, an Eagle, a bear with a wolf on its stomach, Sea Bear, Good Luck Woman with her child, and a Spirit Man. At the very base of the pole is Berners Bay Mountain, or Daxa̱náak Mountain, the home of the Wooshkeetaan.

Good Luck Woman represents the story of a woman who escaped the massacre of her village while secluded during childbirth; the bear with a wolf on its stomach depicts the idea of Wolf claiming the Wooshkeetaan people. The Spirit Man represents the five Spirit Men of the Wooshkeetaanvillage. Though the Wooshkeetaan clan was an Eagle/Wolf clan, the Good Luck Woman story was originated from the Raven clan: this depiction of a traditionally Raven story on the Eagle pole was atypical.

The figure of Uncle Sam, sitting on the dogfish and wearing red, white, and blue and an American flag-patterned top hat, represents the United States government and references the 1882 Angoon bombardment. When an Angoon Tlingit man was accidentally killed on a whaling ship, 200 Angoon Tlingit went to the whaling company to ask for compensation. The whaling company turned to the US Navy for assistance and commander Edgar C. Merriman told the Tlingit people to give Merrimann 400 blankets instead. When the Tlingit people were only able to procure just over 80 blankets, the Navy attacked the village; they "destroyed forty canoes, shelled and burned the village, and helped themselves to ceremonial regalia and furs". The Navy had not yet apologized or provided compensation to the Tlingit for the attacks as of the 1980 carving; the figure of Uncle Sam serves as a reminder of that. (Note: The Navy formally apologized for the attack in 2024.) Aldona Jonaitis describes it as an example of one of the few less-than respectful references to non-Natives in contemporary totem poles and it "condemns" the 1882 military action and response. Other works by Jackson, such as his 1999 Honoring Those Who Give, are more celebratory of the United States government and non-Native people.

The Wooshkeetaan Kootéeyaa weighs 2,000 pounds (910 kg).

=== Áakʼw Kootéeyaa ===
The Áakʼw Kootéeyaa was designed in collaboration with Bessie Visaya, an Auk Tlingit elder. The pole represents specifically the Raven Clan; the figures depicted on the pole are, from top to bottom: Raven standing on four sablefish;, Monster Frog wearing a crown to represent the Big Dipper; Auk crests Dog Salmon and Summer Weasel; and Good Luck Woman (also known as Lucky Lady), with her child and seven mussel shells. According to the story of Good Luck Woman, finding a cluster of seven mussel shells is lucky.

During the 2003 restoration, yellow cedar was used to replace Raven's claws. According to Jackson, the quality of the wood was subpar but "[i]t's going to be inside anyway, so the section [he added] is not going to weather anymore".

== History ==
=== Construction ===
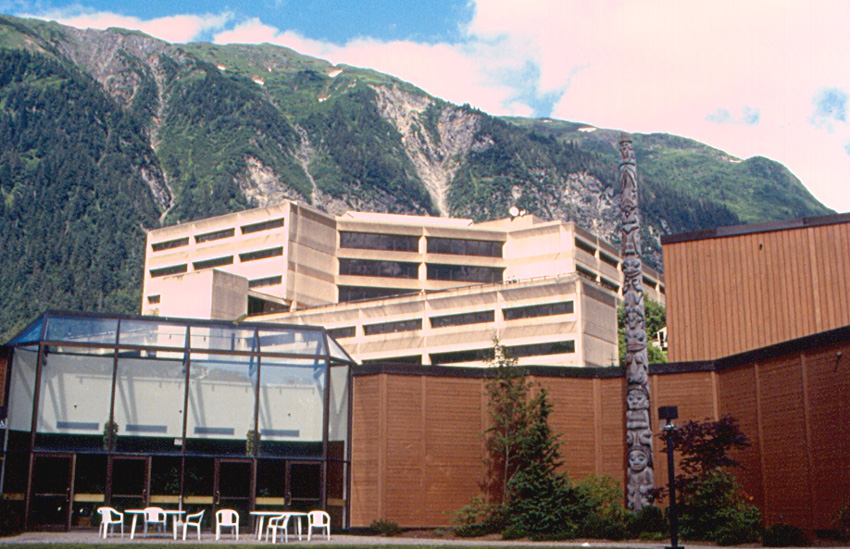
Centennial Hall and Wooshkeetaan Kootéeyaa in 1997

The two poles, along with 65 other pieces of art, were commissioned in 1980 for the Juneau centennial. While the city was interested in just one pole, to represent Juneau, they decided to create two: one to represent each moiety from the Áak’w Kwáan people. One pole would represent the Tléix’ Shangukeidí, or Eagle/Wolf Clans, and one to represent the Tléix’ Laayaneidí, or Raven/Crow Clans. Construction on the first pole, the Wooshkeetaan Kootéeyaa, began in August, 1980, and took six weeks. Funded by the Sohio Alaska Petroleum Company, the process cost US$20,000 (equivalent to $78,150 in 2025). Carving was done in the Sealaska Plaza of the Sealaska Corporation. Work on the Áakʼw Kootéeyaa took place the next year, in 1981. It was expected to cost US$22,000 (equivalent to $85,965 in 2025), and was to be paid for with funds from the Centennial Committee. Its log was donated by the Sealaska Corporation.

Both totem poles were carved by Nathan Jackson, with assistance from Steve Brown and Jackson's wife, Dorica; she painted the Wooshkeetaan Kootéeyaa.

=== Installation at Centennial Hall ===
When the poles were originally commissioned, the city did not know where they were to be installed. Possible sites included the Alaska State Museum, Marine Park, and the yet-to-be-constructed Centennial Hall. In 1983, the Wooshkeetaan Kootéeyaa and Áakʼw Kootéeyaa were installed as a pair outside the Centennial Hall. Dedication ceremonies were to be held by George Jim and Bessie Vasaya, as representatives of the Auk and Wooshkeetaan clans, respectively.

In 1993, the poles were cleaned and zinc plates installed to inhibit plant growth.

=== Áakʼw Kootéeyaa moved ===
Nathan and Dorica Jackson performed restorations on both totem poles in June 2000. During the process, Nathan Jackson noticed the Áakʼw Kootéeyaa had begun to rot and recommended the pole be moved indoors. Three years later, in 2003, the pole was taken down, refurbished by the Jacksons again, and installed in the Juneau-Douglas High School. US$15,000 (equivalent to $26,253 in 2025) in donations were raised for the restorations, coming from Juneau residents and the city's Rotary Club.

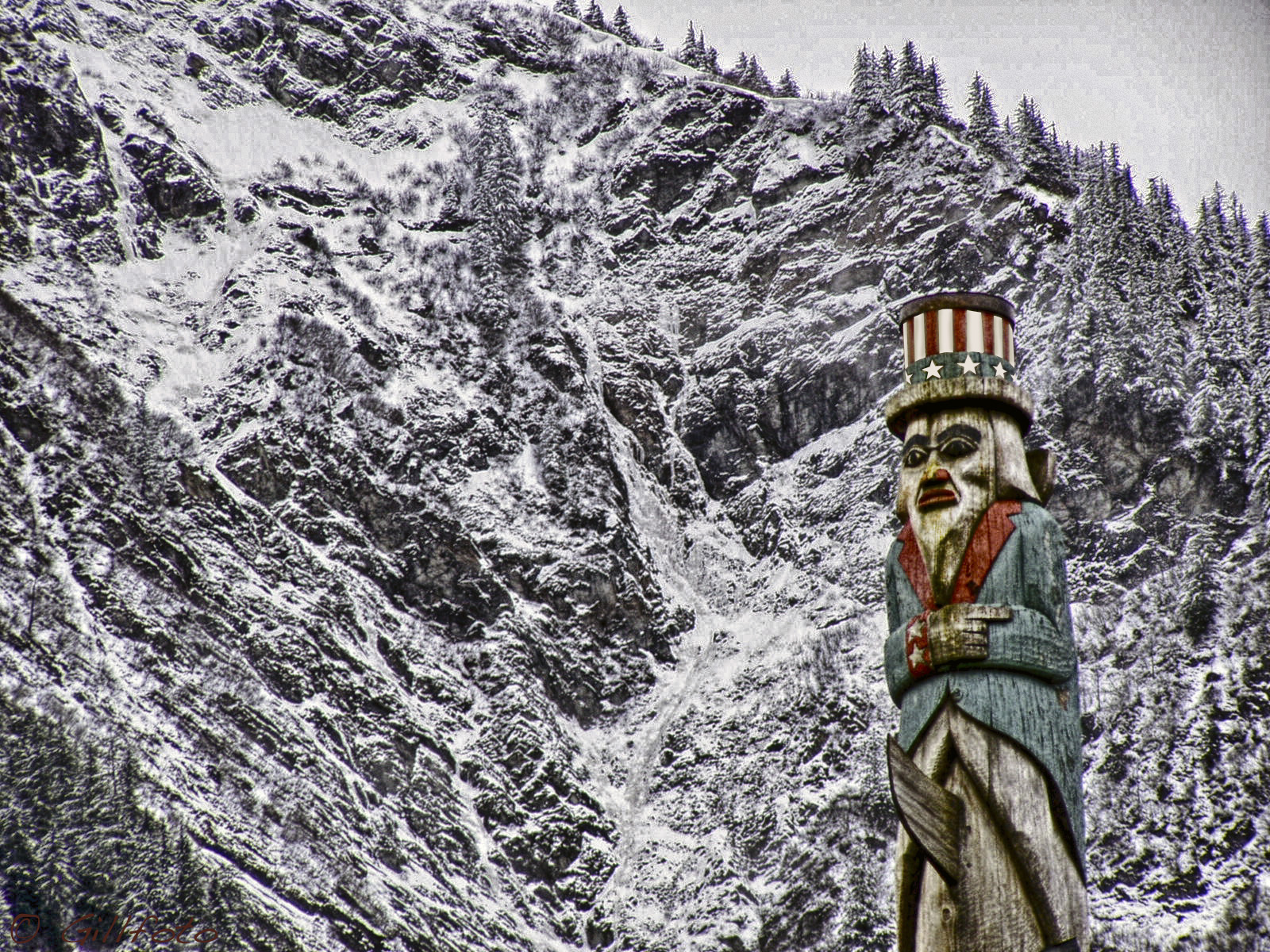
Wooshkeetaan Kootéeyaa in 2003

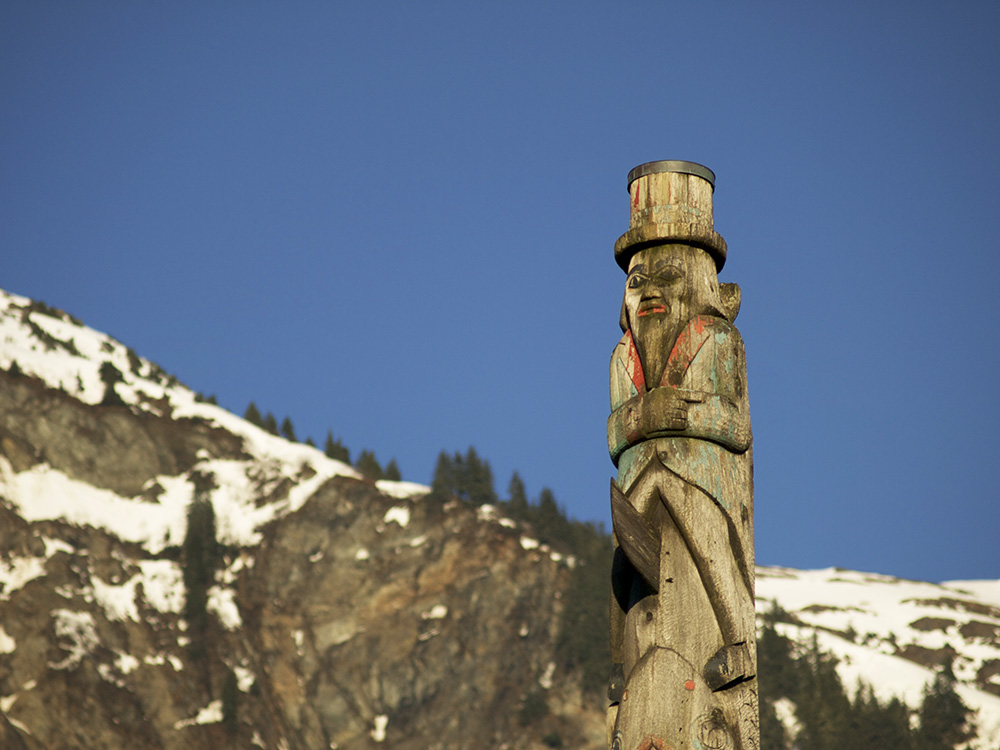
Wooshkeetaan Kootéeyaa in 2014

=== Wooshkeetaan Kootéeyaa moved ===
In late 2014, the Wooshkeetaan Kootéeyaa was inspected by a curator from the Juneau-Douglas City Museum, who found it "pulpy" and "suffering greatly". Degraded by the rain, salt water, and Taku winds, the totem pole had begun to rot and mold. Steven Brown flew up to Juneau in September the next year to inspect the totem; he described it as "severely decayed" and believed it should be removed, saying: "It's just kind of an inevitable situation, and you just have to figure that making it 35 years in Southeast Alaska weather is not that bad". Due to these safety and preservation concerns, the pole was removed from Centennial Hall in the first week of 2016 and placed into storage as part of the permanent collection of the Juneau-Douglas City Museum. There were plans to restore the totem, after letting it dry out for several months.

In 2020, the Juneau-Douglas City Museum began scouting new locations for the totem pole. They and the Wooshkeetaan Clan decided to install it in the atrium of Juneau's downtown State Office Building, alongside the Haida totem pole: the Old Witch pole. According to the clan, the Haida pole would balance the Tlingit Wooshkeetaan Kootéeyaa. The totem pole was moved to its new location in October, 2021, and laid flat until rededication ceremony to allow it to acclimate. Reinstalled by workers Alaska Electric Light & Power, funds to move the totem came from Rotary Club of Juneau, the Friends of the Juneau-Douglas City Museum, and the Museums Alaska's Collections Management Fund. The rededication ceremony on March 11, 2022, was organized by the Wooshkeetaan Clan, the Alaska Department of Transportation and Public Facilities, and the Juneau-Douglas City Museum; speakers at the ceremony included Nathan Jackson, Rosita Worl, Juneau mayor Beth Weldon, and Tlingít Eagle and Raven leaders.

== See also ==
- List of totem poles
