= Linn A. Forrest =

American architect

- Born: Linn Argile Forrest; August 8, 1905; Bucyrus, Ohio
- Died: 1987
- Occupation: Architect
- Years active: 1927–1987

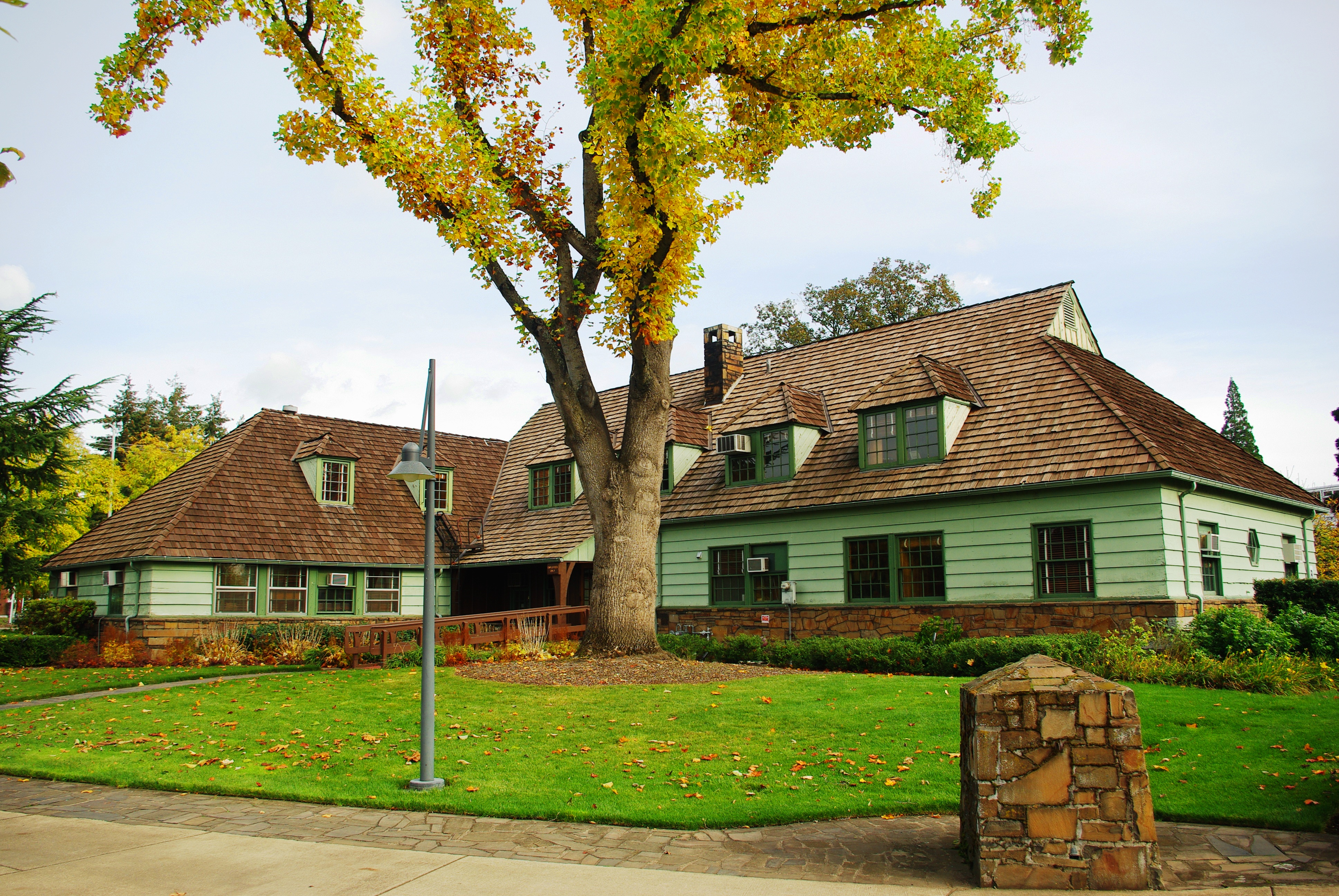
Oregon State Forester's Office Building

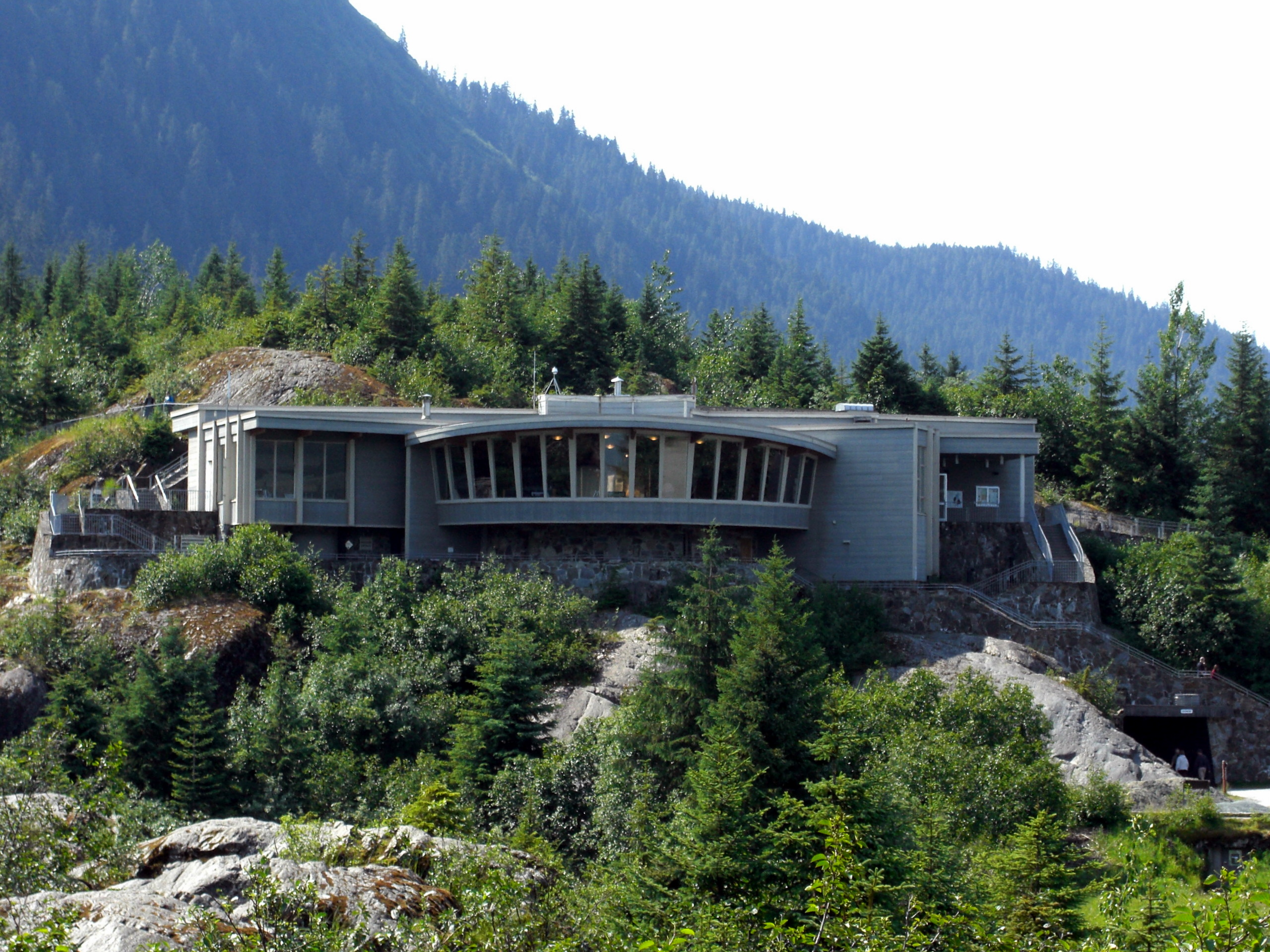
Mendenhall Glacier Visitor Center

Linn Argile Forrest, Sr. ( August 8, 1905–1987) was an American architect of Juneau, Alaska who worked to restore "authentic Southeast Alaska Native architecture, especially totem poles".

== Life and career ==
Linn Argile Forrest Sr. was born on August 8, 1905 in Bucyrus, Ohio. During the 1930s and the Great Depression, he oversaw Civilian Conservation Corps programs of the New Deal to preserve totem poles and other aspects of traditional, native architecture. In conjunction with a $24,000 U.S. grant to the Alaska Native Brotherhood as a CCC project, Forrest oversaw the construction of the Shakes Island Community House and totems at Wrangell, Alaska during 1937–1939. Drawing on this experience, he later wrote The Wolf and the Raven: Totem Poles of Southeastern Alaska, which has been printed in 20 editions.

Forrest designed the Mendenhall Glacier Visitor Center, the Yaxté totem pole, the Juneau Federal Building and, with Harold B. Foss, the nearby Chapel by the Lake.

He designed the Elvey Building and the Ernest N. Patty Gymnasium (1963) at the University of Alaska, Fairbanks.

Forrest came to Alaska after working in the 1930s in Oregon, where he was the lead exterior designer of Timberline Lodge on Mount Hood.

Forrest is the architect of record of the Oregon State Forester's Office Building, at 2600 State Street in Salem, Oregon, constructed by CCC workers and craftsmen and listed on the National Register of Historic Places. At one time he worked for the architecture group within the United States Forest Service Northwest regional office.

Forrest married and had a family. His son, Linn Forrest, Jr., also became an architect. Together the two men designed the original Alaska State Centennial Museum.
