= Holy Trinity Church (Juneau, Alaska) =

Historic church in Alaska, United States

- U.S. National Register of Historic Places
- Alaska Heritage Resources Survey
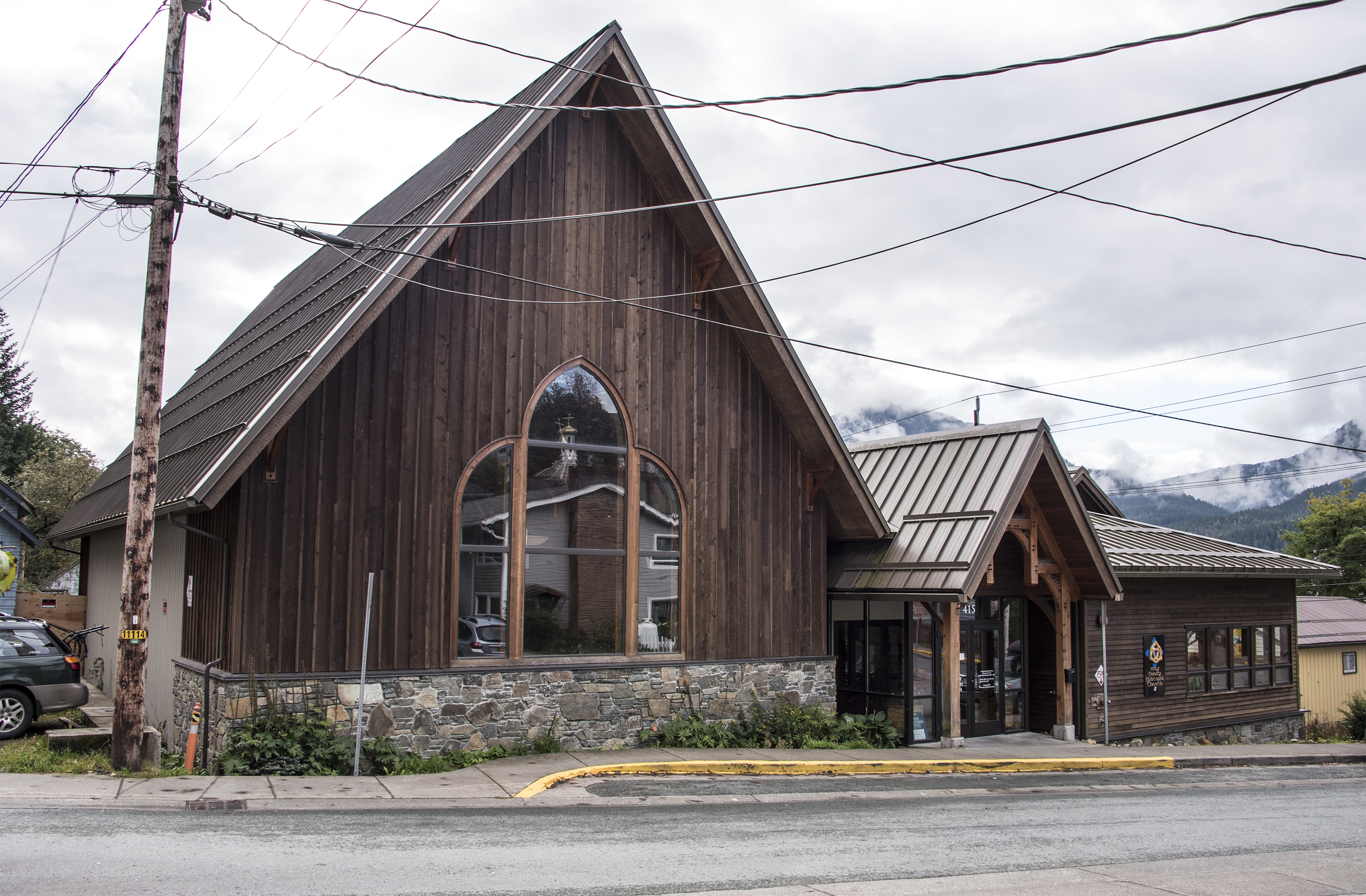

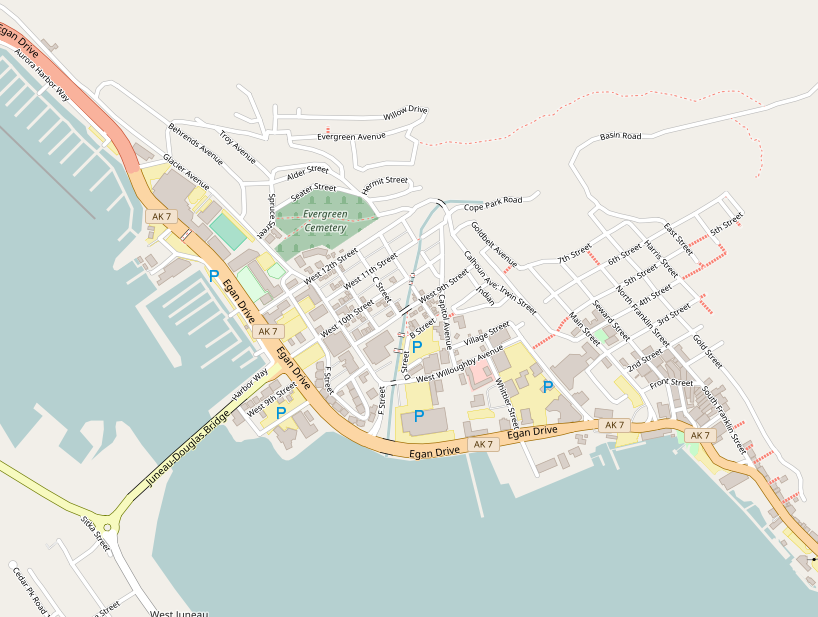
- Location within Juneau Location within Alaska
- Location: 415 Fourth Street; Juneau, Alaska
- Coordinates: 58°18′10″N 134°24′25″W
- Area: less than one acre
- Built: 1896
- Built by: George E. James
- Architect: Foss & Olsen (1956)
- Architectural style: Carpenter Gothic
- NRHP reference No.: 78000528
- AHRS No.: JUN-073

Significant dates
- Added to NRHP: October 19, 1978
- Designated AHRS: July 23, 1973

The Holy Trinity Church, also known as the Church of the Holy Trinity (Episcopal) is a church located at 415 4th Street in Juneau, Alaska. The church reported 217 members in 2016 and 114 members in 2023; no membership statistics were reported in 2024 parochial reports. Plate and pledge income for the congregation in 2024 was $183,115 with average Sunday attendance (ASA) of 46.

The present building was built in 2009, replacing an 1896 structure which burned on March 12, 2006.

The old church was designed by architect George E. James in the Carpenter Gothic style, and was built by Foss and Olsen in 1896 to serve a mission congregation founded only the year before. Sometime before 1914 the church building was raised up to allow the addition of a basement. The parish hall built in 1956 did not continue the Carpenter Gothic architecture of the church itself. From 1918-1944, the church served as the pro-cathedral of the Episcopal Diocese of Alaska. On October 19, 1978, the church was added to the National Register of Historic Places.

== See also ==
- National Register of Historic Places listings in Juneau, Alaska
