= The Wrangell Sentinel =

Weekly newspaper published in Wrangell, Alaska

Wrangell Sentinel
- Oldest Continuously Published Newspaper in Alaska
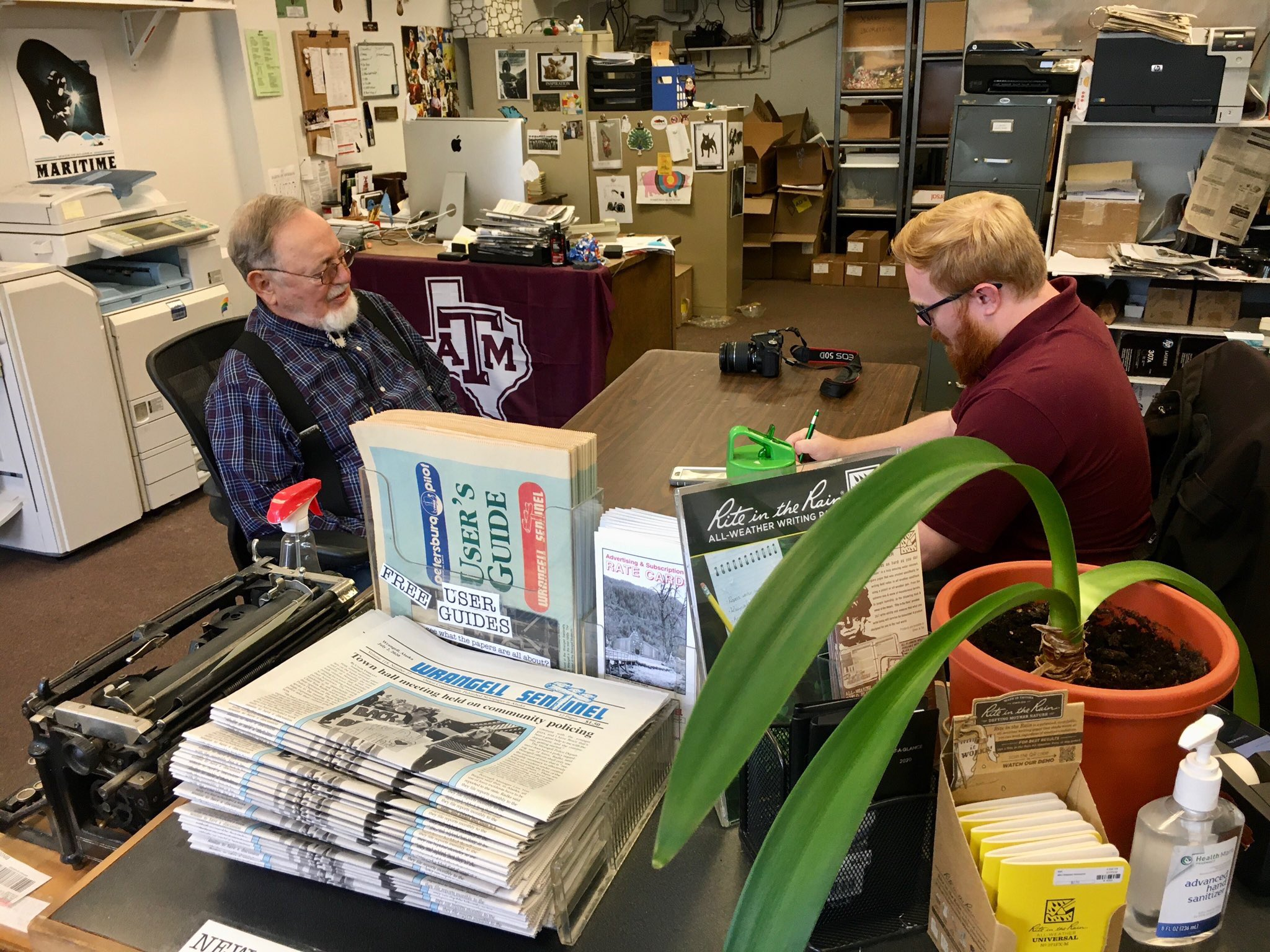
- Don Young being interviewed at The Wrangell Sentinel in 2020
- Type: Weekly newspaper
- Owner: Larry Persily
- Founder: A.V.R. Snyder
- Founded: 1902
- Language: English
- Circulation: 600
- ISSN: 2837-6595
- OCLC number: 1378685787
- Website: wrangellsentinel.com

The Wrangell Sentinel is a weekly newspaper founded in 1902 in Wrangell, Alaska. The newspaper remains in publication with only a few short periods of inactivity. It is one of the oldest continuously published newspapers in Alaska. The paper covered potlach traditional celebrations.

== History ==
On November 20, 1902, the first issue of the Alaska Sentinel was published by A.V.R. Snyder, who was from Oregon and at one time reported for the Dixon Telegraph in Illinois. At that time Wrangell was a seaport with around 800 inhabitants. Snyder moved to Alaska to work as a deputy collector of customs. In 1905, the owner's son George Curtis Lee Snyder was named editor and business manager. At that time Snyder was appointed the town's United States court commissioner, but Governor Wilford Bacon Hoggatt removed him from office in 1907 after he published an article in the Sentinel critical of the governor.

In February 1909, the Alaska Sentinel ceased. Richard Bushell Jr. relaunched the paper as the Wrangell Sentinel in June 1909. Harold F. Dawes became the owner two years later, and Bushell resumed ownership in 1913. Later that year the Sentinel was purchased by Paul F. Stanhope, who then sold it in 1916 to J. W. Pritchett. On August 19, 1920, Pritchett, received a copy of The New York Times sent by plane, the first piece of mail to arrive in Alaska by plane. Mrs. Pritchett took over running the paper in 1930 when her husband became ill. She was the paper's editor and publisher for 8 years.

In 1939, Lew M. Williams Sr., bought the paper from her. He formerly worked at The News Tribune, and had moved to Alaska to work at Juneau Empire. After moving to Wrangell, Williams Sr. served as postmaster and mayor. He was appointed Alaska Secretary of State in 1944. His son Lew M. Williams Jr. soon started work at the paper and assisted his father. The Williams family purchased Petersburg Press in 1956. Williams Jr. then left the Sentinel to manage their other paper in Petersburg, Alaska.

In September 1967, the Sentinel and Press were purchased by Charles F. Willis, president of Alaska Airlines, and Al Phelps, editor of The Nome Nugget, doing business as Nome Nugget Publishing Co. In July 1968, the Williams foreclosed on the sale alleging delinquent payments. The company filed an injection but Superior Court Judge Thomas Stewart ruled in favor of the Williams, who regained ownership of the Sentinel and Press in February 1969. A few weeks later the two sides reached an agreement and Willis resumed control of the two papers. In March 1971, Jamie Bryson bought the Sentinel. A year later his wife Linda Bryson died in a plane crash. Jamie Bryson was injured, but fishermen pulled him out of the Queen Charlotte Strait and he survived.

In December 1972, former owner Williams died. In May 1976, Larry Persily and Leslie Murray bought the paper. They sold it in August 1984 to Alvin Bunch and Ann Kirkwood. Bunch previously worked as a copy editor at the Anchorage Daily News. Two decades later the new owners filed for Chapter 7 bankruptcy and in December 1996, Persily bought back the paper for $10,000. He was the paper's largest creditor, and lost $70,000 in the bankruptcy. In June 1996, Persily sold the paper to Mrs. Seanne Gillen Saunders. In December 2003, Saunders sold the Sentinel to Anne and Ron Loesch, owners of the Petersburg Pilot. Persily reacquired the Sentinel in December 2020.

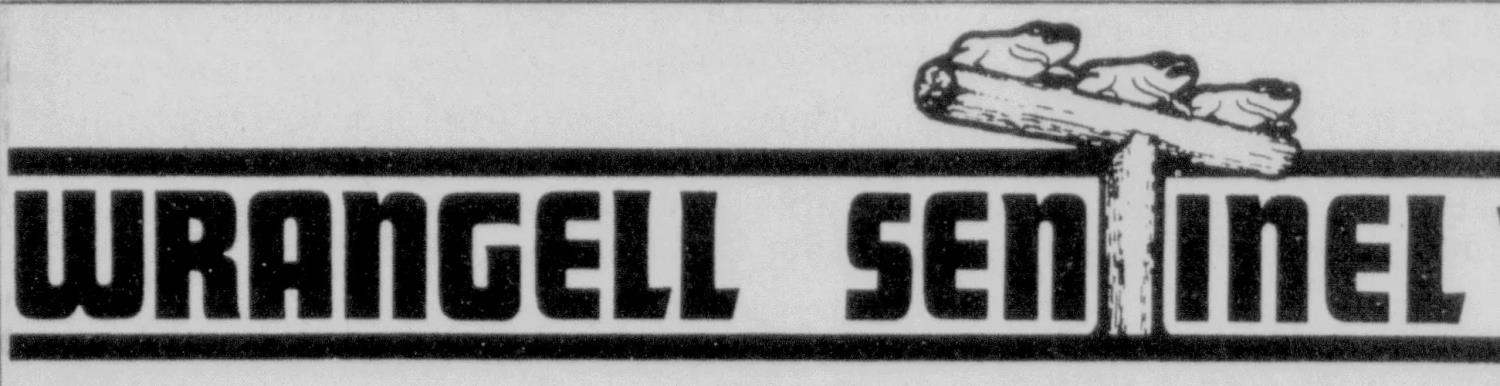
The Wrangell Sentinel masthead in 1985, including a depiction of the Three Frogs ridicule pole

From the 1970s to 2024, the Sentinel used the replicas of the Three Frogs ridicule pole in its branding and masthead; after Tlingit clans removed the replica of the pole in 2024, the newspaper discontinued its use of the totem pole.
