= Chapel by the Lake =

Church in Alaska, United States

Coordinates: 58°23′00″N 134°38′14″W

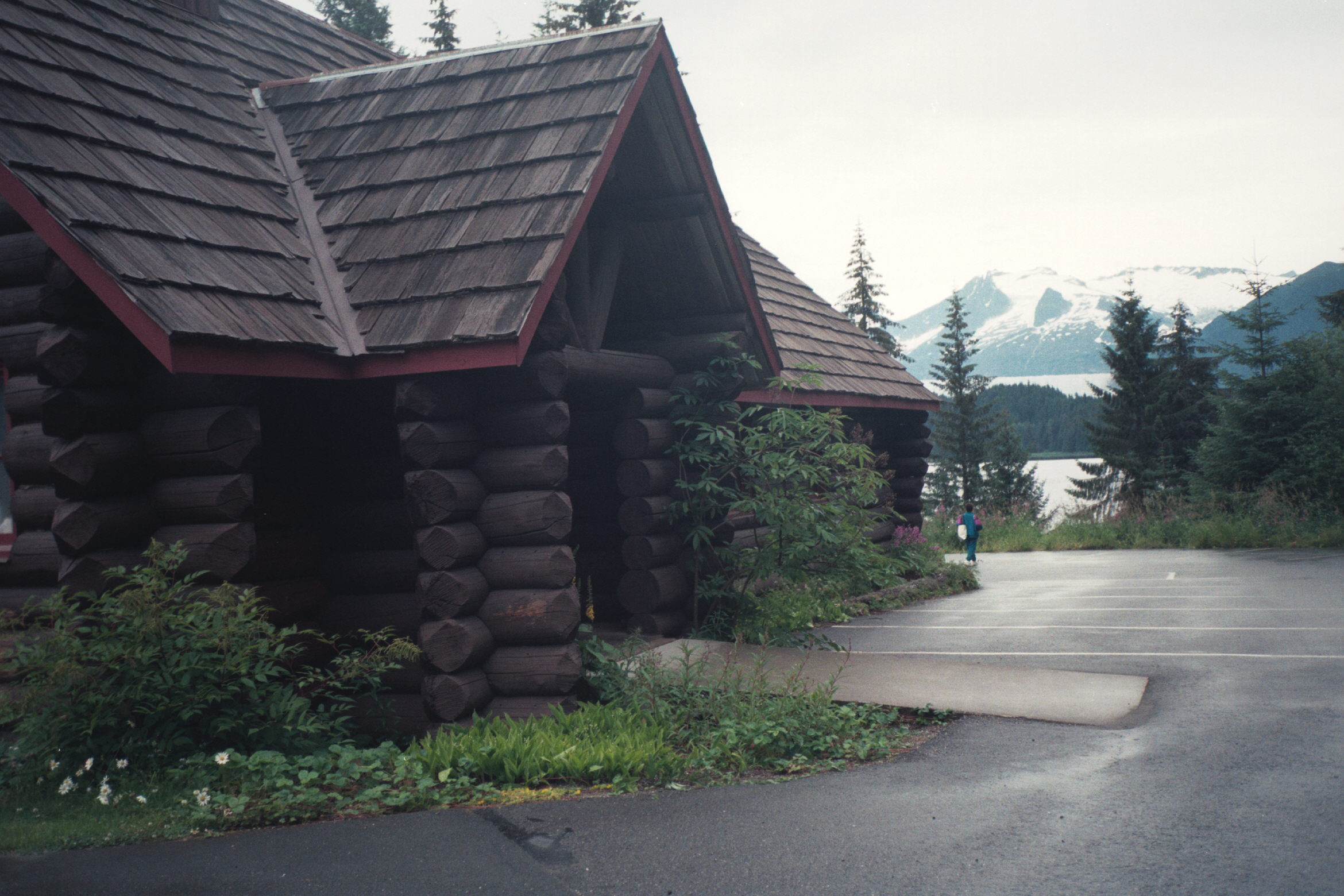
- Chapel by the Lake
- Country: United States
- Denomination: Presbyterian
- Website: www.chapelbythelake.org

History
- Status: Church

Architecture
- Functional status: Active
- Architect(s): Harold B. Foss, Linn A. Forrest
- Style: National Park Service Rustic
- Groundbreaking: 1954
- Completed: 1958

Specifications
- Materials: Logs, shingles

Clergy
- Pastor: Rev. Dr. Tim Harrison

Chapel by the Lake (or Chapel-by-the-Lake) is a Presbyterian church in Auke Bay, Alaska. It was designed by Juneau-based architects Harold Foss and Linn A. Forrest. The construction lasted from 1954 to 1958.

== Notable features ==
The Chapel by the Lake is an example of Rustic architecture in a suburban location. Its rafters, trusses, and walls are visible spruce logs. A large window behind the altar looks out across Auke Lake to the Mendenhall Glacier.

== Services ==
The chapel is a popular spot for weddings.

A 1992 service at the chapel was held for Karl Reishus, a Juneau Police Department officer who was killed in the line of duty after saving the lives of two firefighters caught in a training accident.
