= Petersburg Pilot =

Newspaper in Petersburg, Alaska

- Type: Weekly newspaper
- Owner: Orin Pierson
- Founder(s): Albert O. Elstad; John W. Schoettler
- Founded: 1926
- Language: English
- Headquarters: 207 N. Nordic Drive; Petersburg, AK
- Website: petersburgpilot.com

The Petersburg Pilot is a weekly newspaper published in Petersburg, Alaska.

== History ==
=== Petersburg Report (1914-1926) ===
On December 5, 1914, Lynn W. Miller published the first edition of the Petersburg Report in Petersburg, Alaska. In June 1918, Miller sold the paper to M.S. Perkins. In March 1924, Sidney D. Charles bought the Report and renamed it to the Petersburg Herald. In March 1926, the Herald ceased.

=== Petersburg Press (1926-1974) ===
On August 27, 1926, Albert O. Elstad and John W. Schoettler published the first edition of the Petersburg Press. It was seen as a successor to the Report and the Herald. In June 1928, Elstad sold his share to Schoettler and then bought a laundromat. In February 1930, Schoettler agreed to lease the paper to Elstad for one year.

In March 1935, Hazen W. Brough bought the Press from Elstad. A few years later Brough was hospitalized in Chicago. In May 1941, his wife Marion Brough sold the Press to Clarre A. Wilder. Two years later his daughter, Miss Betty Mae Wilder, married Edward L. Clemons. C.A. Wilder left the paper for Seattle and then got a job in the mechanical department at the Las Cruces Sun-News. His wife became a staff writer at the New Mexican paper in June 1949. Their son William Wilder was left in charge of the Press. In March 1950, the couple returned to the Press when their son was injured after a skeet trap launched a clay pigeon and hit him in the face from a foot away.

Their son-in-law E.L. Clemons published the Press for three years. In May 1956, Clemons sold the paper to Lew Williams Sr., owner of The Wrangell Sentinel. In September 1967, the Sentinel and Press were purchased by Charles F. Willis, president of Alaska Airlines, and Al Phelps, editor of The Nome Nugget, doing business as Nome Nugget Publishing Co. In July 1968, the Williams foreclosed on the sale alleging delinquent payments. The company filed an injection but Superior Court Judge Thomas Stewart ruled in favor of the Williams, who regained ownership of the Sentinel and Press in February 1969. A few weeks later the two sides reached an agreement and Willis resumed control of the two papers. In March 1971, Glenn Luckie bought the Press.

=== Petersburg Pilot (1974-Present) ===
In March 1974, the Petersburg Press ceased and Jamie Bryson, who owned the The Wrangell Sentinel, launched a new paper to replace it called the Petersburg Pilot. In March 1975, Bryon shuttered the Pilot because he didn't have the manpower needed to publish two papers. But Von Brashchler bought the Pilot and revived a few weeks later. In July 1976, Ron Loesch purchased the Pilot. In January 2022, after publishing the paper for over 45 years, he sold it to Orin Pierson.
