= Harold B. Foss =

American architect

Harold Byron Foss
- Born: November 17, 1910; Montesano, Washington
- Died: 1988 (aged 77–78)
- Occupation: Architect
- Practice: H. B. Foss Co.; Foss & Malcolm; Foss, Malcolm & Olsen; Foss & Olsen; Foss, Olsen & Sands

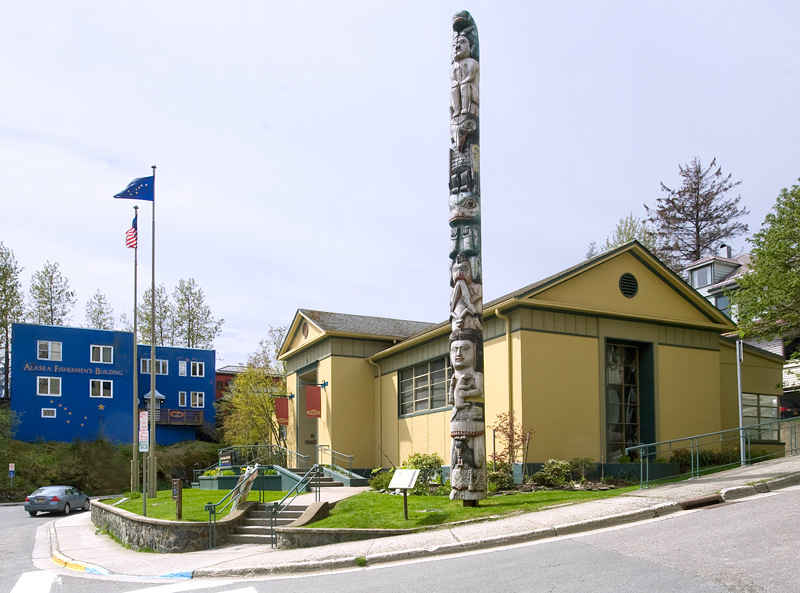
Memorial Library, Juneau, 1950.

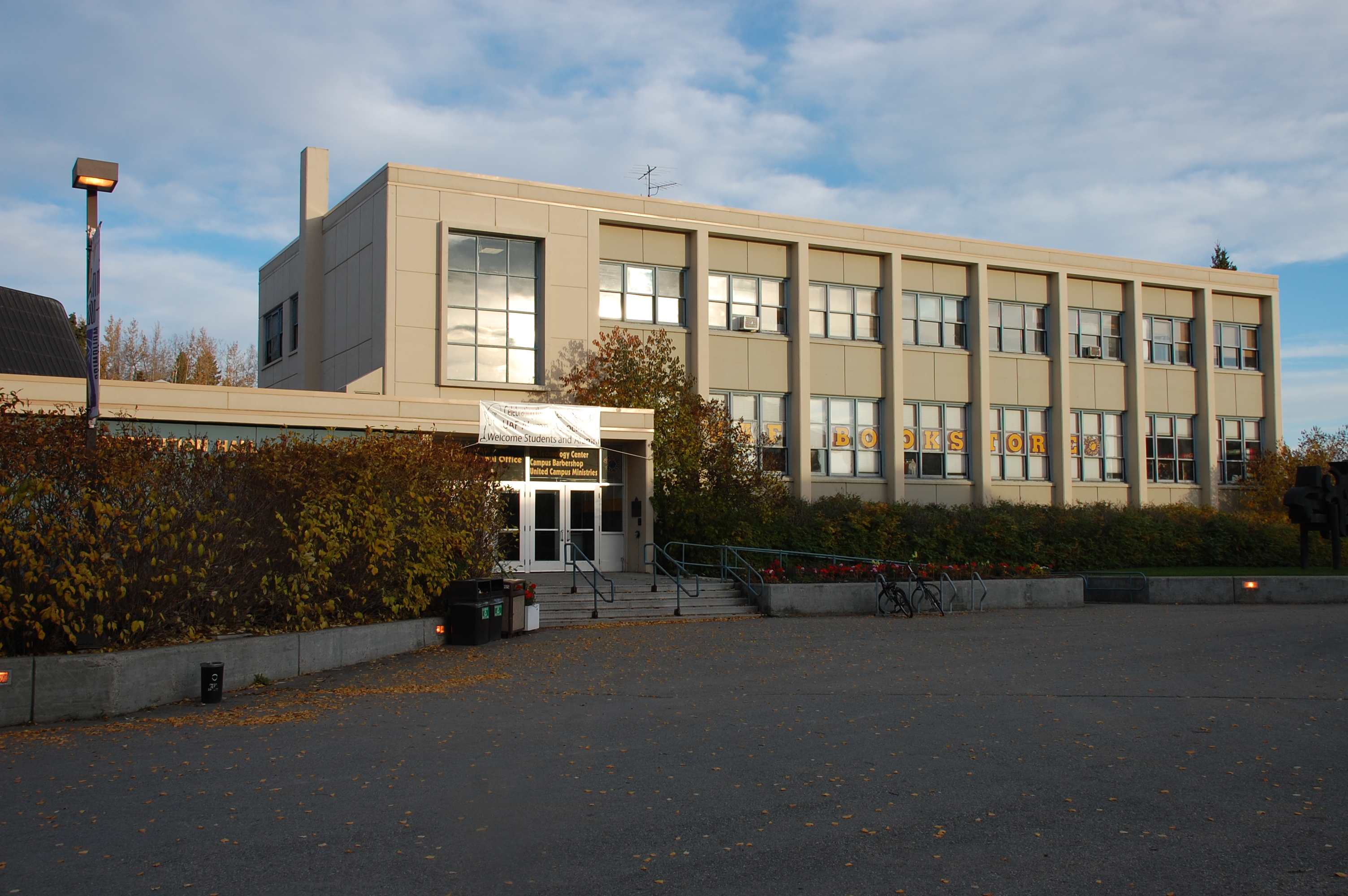
Constitution Hall, UAF, 1955.

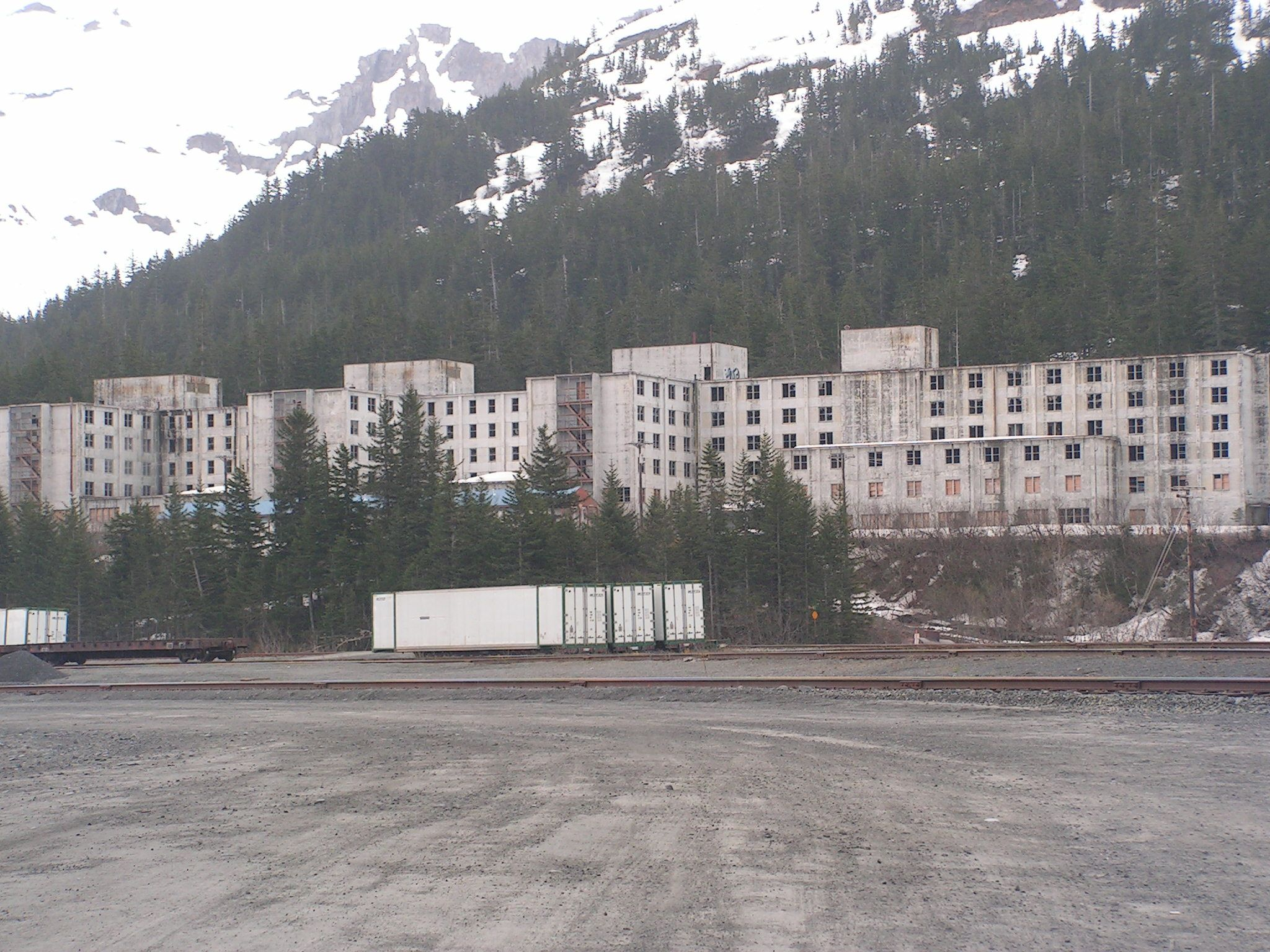
Buckner Building, Whittier, 1953.

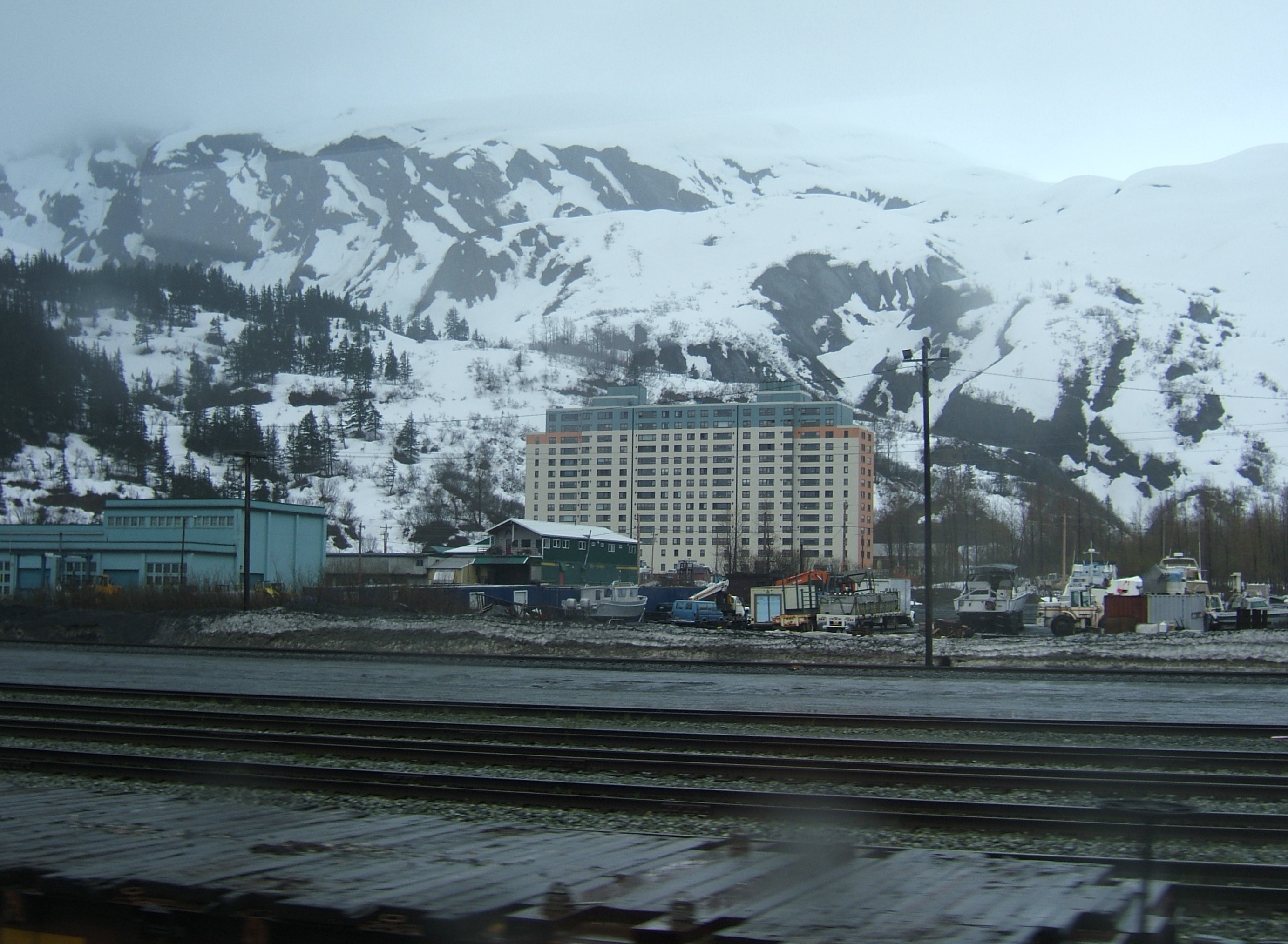
Hodge Building, Whittier, 1954.

Harold B. Foss (1910–1988) was an American architect from Juneau, Alaska.

Harold Byron Foss was born November 17, 1910, in Montesano, Washington. He was educated at the University of Washington, graduating in 1935. That year he went to Juneau, where he formed the H. B. Foss Company. MacKay Malcolm and Bjarne Carl Olsen were later added as partners, in 1945 and 1950. Malcolm died in 1951, but his name remained until 1956, when the firm was reduced to Foss & Olsen. This period was brief, and Edward Elmer Sands was added later that same year. Foss, Olsen & Sands was succeeded by Olsen & Sands when Foss moved to Palo Alto, California in 1958. He died there in 1988.

Foss was known throughout Alaska primarily as an architect of public buildings, of which he designed many.

== Works ==
=== H. B. Foss Company, 1935-1945 ===
- 1939 - Stanley Grummet House, 603 W 10th St, Juneau, Alaska
- 1939 - Walter Sharpe House, 603 W 11th St, Juneau, Alaska
- 1939 - Clifford Swap House, 610 W 11th St, Juneau, Alaska
- 1940 - Eielson Memorial Building, University of Alaska, Fairbanks, Alaska
  - Begun in 1930 by N. Lester Troast, an architect from Sitka.
- 1940 - James Larsen House, 712 W 11th St, Juneau, Alaska
- 1940 - Carl Weidman House, 622 W 11th St, Juneau, Alaska
- 1941 - James Orme House, 924 D St, Juneau, Alaska
- 1945 - Evelyn I. Butler House, 908 B St, Juneau, Alaska
- 1945 - Rebuilding of Hoonah, Alaska
  - Much of the city was burned in 1944.

=== Foss & Malcolm, 1945-1950 ===
- 1945 - James Larsen House, 416 W 9th St, Juneau, Alaska
- 1946 - Walter Stutte House, 610 W 9th St, Juneau, Alaska
- 1947 - Mt. Edgecumbe Hospital, 222 Tongass Dr, Sitka, Alaska
- 1947 - Petersburg Municipal Building, 12 S Nordic Dr, Petersburg, Alaska
- 1948 - Rae C. Stedman Memorial School, Dolphin St, Petersburg, Alaska
- 1948 - Terminal, Juneau International Airport, Juneau, Alaska
  - Altered.
- 1949 - Anchorage Tuberculosis Hospital, E 3rd Ave, Anchorage, Alaska
  - Demolished.
- 1949 - U. S. Bureau of Mines Experiment Station, 100 Savikko Rd, Juneau Island, Douglas, Alaska
- 1950 - Juneau City Hall, 155 S Seward St, Juneau, Alaska
- 1950 - Juneau Memorial Library, 114 W 4th St, Juneau, Alaska

=== Foss, Malcolm & Olsen, 1950-1956 ===
- 1950 - Cathedral Arms, 237 Lincoln St, Sitka, Alaska
- 1952 - Alaska State Office Building, 350 Main St, Juneau, Alaska
- 1952 - Brooks Memorial Mines Building, University of Alaska, Fairbanks, Alaska
- 1952 - Mendenhall Apartments, 326 4th St, Juneau, Alaska
- 1953 - Buckner Building, Whittier, Alaska
- 1953 - Chena Building, 510 2nd Ave, Fairbanks, Alaska
- 1953 - Andrew Nerland Hall, University of Alaska, Fairbanks, Alaska
- 1954 - Chapel by the Lake, 11024 Auke Lake Way, Auke Bay, Alaska
  - With Linn A. Forrest.
- 1954 - Hodge Building, Whittier, Alaska
- 1954 - Petersburg Hospital, 103 Fram St, Petersburg, Alaska
- 1954 - St. Ann's Hospital, 415 6th St, Juneau, Alaska
- 1955 - Constitution Hall, University of Alaska, Fairbanks, Alaska
- 1955 - Sitka Community Hospital, Moller Ave, Sitka, Alaska

=== Foss & Olsen, 1956 ===
- 1956 - Parish House for Holy Trinity Episcopal Church, 325 Gold St, Juneau, Alaska

=== Foss, Olsen & Sands, 1956-1958 ===
- 1956 - Bethel Armory, 470 4th Ave, Bethel, Alaska
- 1956 - John E. McIntosh Hall, University of Alaska, Fairbanks, Alaska
- 1957 - U. S. Post Office, 113 Front St, Nome, Alaska
- 1958 - Morton Stevens Hall, University of Alaska, Fairbanks, Alaska
