= Oregon State Forester's Office Building =

- U.S. National Register of Historic Places
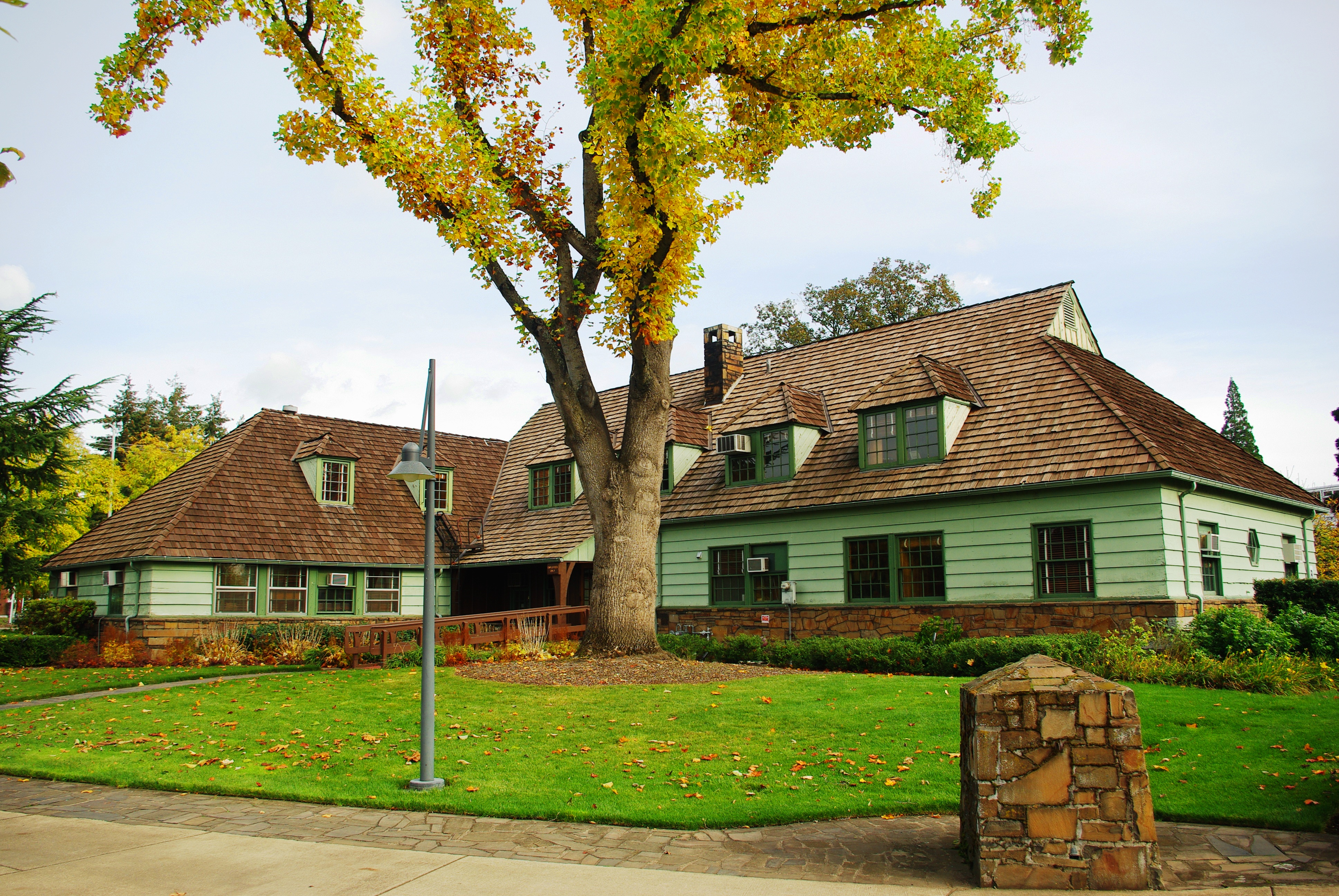

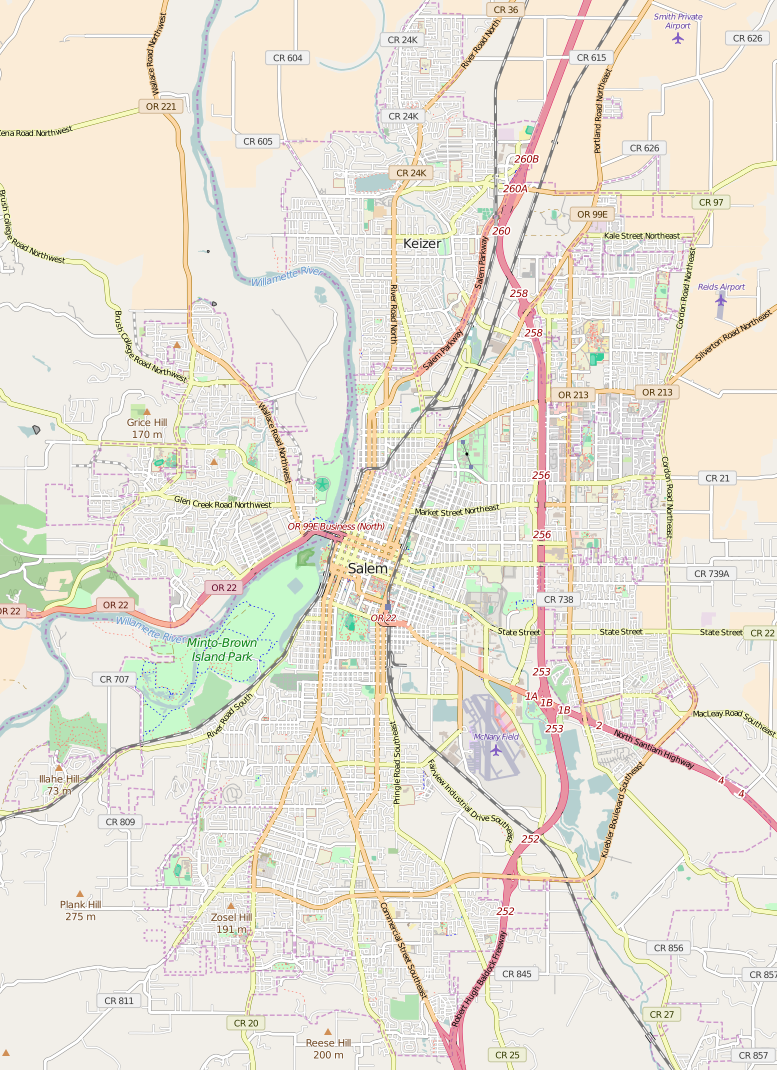
- Location within Salem OR Location within Oregon
- Location: 2600 State St, Salem, Oregon
- Coordinates: 44°55′52″N 123°0′23″W
- Area: 2.3 acres (0.93 ha)
- Built: 1938
- Architect: Linn A. Forrest
- Architectural style: National Park Style
- NRHP reference No.: 82003738
- Added to NRHP: April 15, 1982

The Oregon State Forester's Office Building is a historic building in Salem, Oregon, United States that is used by the head of the Oregon Department of Forestry. The 1938 building was listed on the National Register of Historic Places (NRHP) in 1982. It was designed by Linn A. Forrest in the "National Park Style". The NRHP listing includes two additional contributing structures.
