= Constitution Hall (University of Alaska Fairbanks) =

- U.S. National Register of Historic Places
- Alaska Heritage Resources Survey
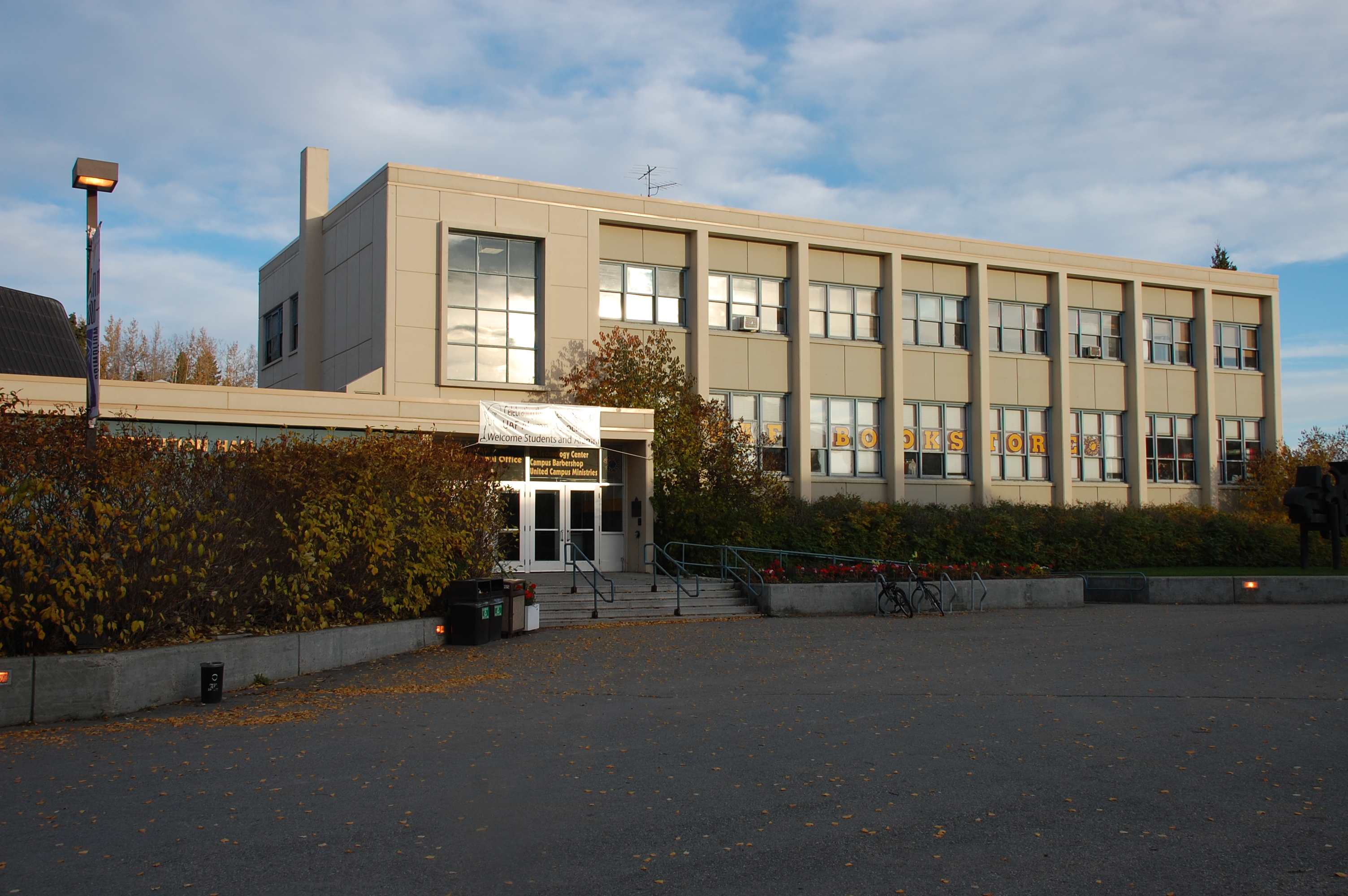
- Constitution Hall in 2012

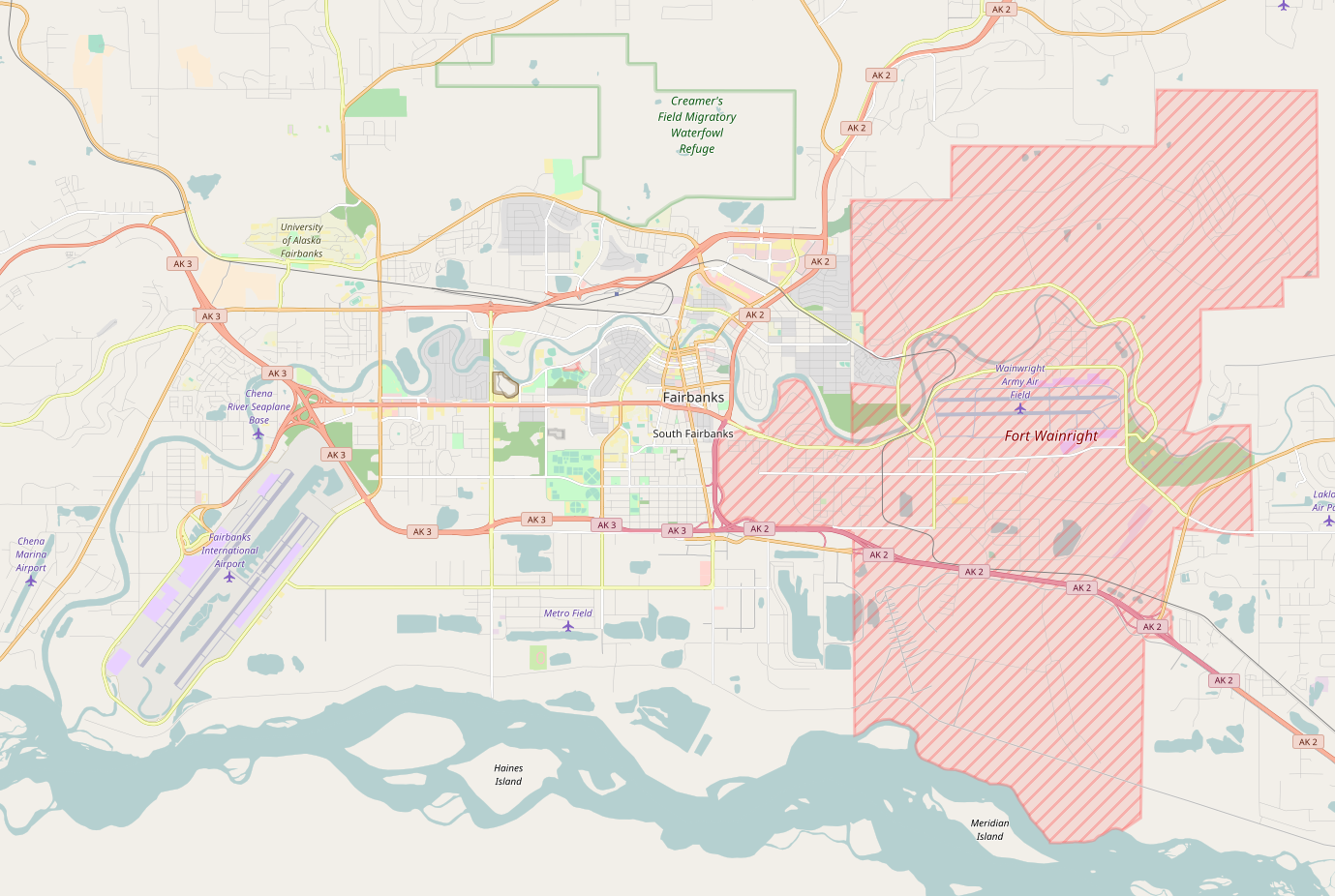
- Location within Fairbanks Location within Alaska
- Location: University of Alaska Fairbanks campus, Fairbanks, Alaska
- Coordinates: 64°51′27″N 147°49′19″W
- Area: less than one acre
- Built: 1955
- Built by: Pacific Construction Company
- Architect: Foss, Malcom & Olson
- Architectural style: Modern Movement
- NRHP reference No.: 05001196
- AHRS No.: FAI-00002
- Added to NRHP: November 3, 2005

Constitution Hall (also known as Convention Hall, Alaska Constitution Hall and the Student Union Building) houses the student center at the University of Alaska Fairbanks in Fairbanks, Alaska. Completed in 1955, the building was the site that year of the meeting at which the Alaska State Constitution was drafted, a milestone in the territory's drive for statehood. It is a reinforced concrete structure two stories high. The building currently houses a bookstore, barbershop, alumni association offices, and the campus mail room.

The building was listed on the National Register of Historic Places in 2005.

== See also ==
- National Register of Historic Places listings in Fairbanks North Star Borough, Alaska
