= Wrangell Institute =

Boarding school in Wrangell, Alaska

Coordinates: 56.3961°N 132.3390°W

Wrangell Institute was an American Indian boarding school in Wrangell, Alaska, United States, operated by the Bureau of Indian Affairs for natives of Alaska. It operated from 1932 until 1975.

== History ==
In 1877, the first Presbyterian church in Alaska, the first Protestant church of any kind in the area, was founded near its current location in Wrangell at 220 Church Street. Reverend S. Hall Young, a colleague of minister Sheldon Jackson, was assigned to the Wrangell mission. He arrived on July 10, 1878.

Young worked among both miners and the Tlingit. He established the Fort Wrangell Tlingit Industrial School to teach young Tlingit men various American trades, such as printing, boatbuilding, and construction from 1877 to 1907. This institution was a parallel to Sheldon Jackson's Sitka Industrial Training School, which later developed as Sheldon Jackson College.

The Wrangell Institute was established in 1932 by the United States Bureau of Indian Affairs (BIA) on a site a few miles south of Wrangell. In its first year, it had 71 students. It was described as "one of the pet projects of the Roosevelt Administration".

Children were forced by the BIA to attend the school, which for some was a traumatic experience. Some were brought from homes on the open tundra to a forested and mountainous region. At the school, they were forbidden to speak their native language and in some cases were subjected to violence and sexual abuse.

During World War II in 1942 Aleuts were evacuated from northern Alaska and housed in a tented encampment on the site.

The school closed in 1975. That year, the Indian Self-Determination and Education Assistance Act of 1975 was passed, enabling tribes to contract with the BIA to provide and manage education for their children. They took over some schools located on reservations or built new ones, so that their children would not have to go away to be educated. In addition, in the "Molly Hootch case" (Tobeluk v. Lind), the federal court ruled that the federal government had to provide local schools in villages that had eight or more children.

== Legacy ==
In 2016, there were plans to build a new boarding school on the site of the former Wrangell Institute.

== Alumni ==
- Amos Wallace
