= Juneau-Douglas City Museum =

- Juneau Memorial Library
- U.S. National Register of Historic Places
- Alaska Heritage Resources Survey
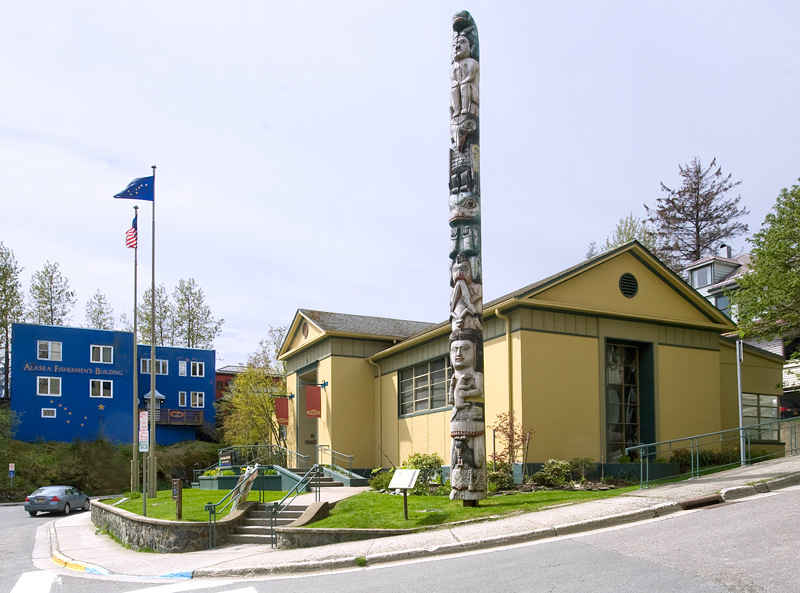

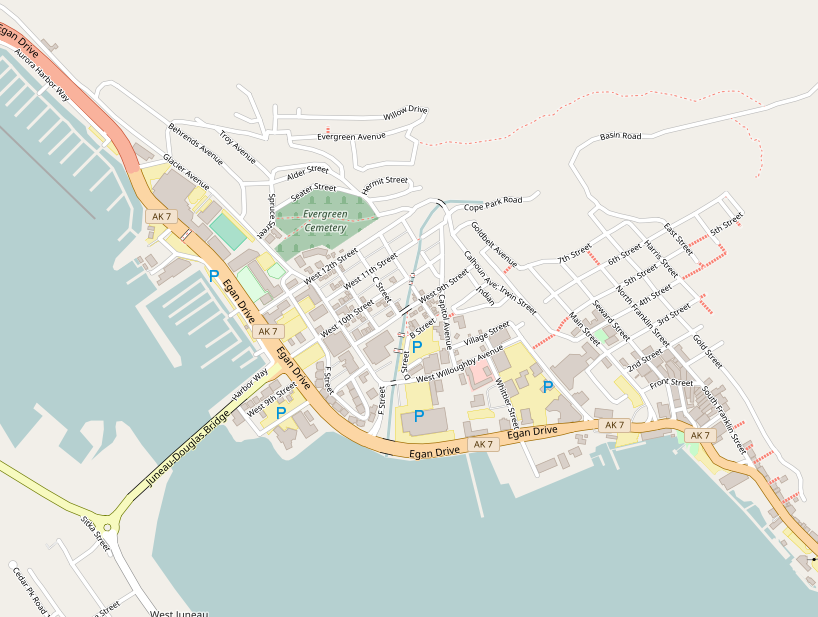
- Location within Juneau Location within Alaska
- Location: 114 West Fourth Street, Juneau, Alaska
- Coordinates: 58°18′7″N 134°24′41″W
- Area: less than one acre
- Built: 1950-51
- Architect: Foss & Malcolm
- Architectural style: Classical Revival
- NRHP reference No.: 06000463
- AHRS No.: JUN-00038
- Added to NRHP: June 7, 2006

The Juneau-Douglas City Museum is located at the corner of 4th and Main, opposite the Alaska State Capitol in Juneau, Alaska. It occupies a building which was built in 1950–51 to house the Juneau Memorial Library. It is a two-story Classical Revival structure built out of concrete with red marble trim elements. A gable-roofed projecting section at the center of the long wall provides the main entrance, which is recessed in an opening the full height to the pediment. This projecting section is flanked by banks of five metal-framed awning windows. The northeast facade has a gable pediment similar to that of the entry projection, below which is a large rectangular window, behind which a stained glass decoration has been installed. The building served the city as its library until the 1980s, at which time it was repurposed to house the city museum.

The museum's exhibits include gold mining, hydropower, skiing, outdoor recreation, fishing, politics and city history. Outside the museum sits Harnessing of the Atom, a totem pole carved by Tlingit artist Amos Wallace in 1967. The Wooshkeetaan Kootéeyaa and Áakʼw Kootéeyaa, located offsite, are in the museum's permanent collection. From 1954 to 1970, the building housed Dwight Wallace's Old Witch totem pole.

The building was listed on the National Register of Historic Places in 2006.

== See also ==
- National Register of Historic Places listings in Juneau, Alaska
