= Amos Wallace =

Tlingit artist from Juneau, Alaska

- Jeet Yaaw Dustaa
- Born: 1920
- Died: 2004 (aged 83–84)
- Known for: Totem pole carver; Artist

Amos Louis Wallace (Tlingit: Jeet Yaaw Dustaa; 1920–2004) was a Tlingit artist from Juneau, Alaska. He was of the T’akhdeintaan, a Raven clan from Hoonah, Alaska.

== Personal life ==
Born in 1920 in Juneau, Alaska, Amos Wallace lived in Hoonah until the age of six, and moved back to Juneau at the age of seven when he started to learn carving from his uncles and brothers. He attended elementary school at the Pius X Mission Catholic boarding school in Skagway, and later attended boarding school at the Wrangell Institute for Alaska Native youth.

He served in the Army in World War II, and in 1960 married Dorothy Wanamaker (1916-2006), who became Dorothy Wallace. Their children are Merle, Beverly, Anna, Kenny, Kathleen, Daryle, Roger, Sonja and Brian. Wallace died in 2004.

== Career ==
In 1958, a New York department store hired Wallace to carve totems in celebration of the Alaska Statehood Act, one of which ended up at the Brooklyn Children's Museum. Shortly after, he was invited to appear on the Tonight Show starring Jack Paar. He also carved a totem pole for Disneyland and had a piece exhibited at the Alaska State Museum’s statehood exhibit.

Wallace was recognized with awards over his lifetime. In 1969, Wallace was awarded the Governor's Arts & Humanities Award by the state of Alaska. In 1998 the Juneau Tlingit-Haida Community Council named him a Living Cultural Treasure.

== Collections ==
Wallace's art is in the collections of the Brooklyn Children's Museum, the Clausen Memorial Museum, the Cincinnati Museum of Natural History, museums in Toronto and Boston, and the Smithsonian's National Museum of the American Indian in Washington D.C. His archive of drawings, photographs and notes and newspaper clippings are in the Sealaska Heritage Institute. A 1967 piece, Harnessing of the Atom, is on display at the Juneau-Douglas City Museum.
