= Robin K. Wright =

American art historian

Robin K. Wright is an American art historian. She is a professor emerita at the University of Washington and was curator at the Burke Museum in Seattle, where she was a director of the Bill Holm Center. She retired in 2015 and was made director emerita.

Wright has written or edited multiple books on Northwest Coast art history. Her book A Time of Gathering won a 1992 Washington State Governor's Writers Award and her book Northern Haida Master Carvers won a 2002 Washington State Book Awards. She studied art history at the University of Washington, earning a master's in 1977 and a doctorate in 1985.

== Bibliography ==
- A Time of Gathering: Native Heritage in Washington State. Burke Museum of Natural History and Culture and University of Washington Press. 1991. (Edited)
- Northern Haida master carvers. Seattle : Vancouver: University of Washington Press ; Douglas & McIntyre. 2001. ISBN 978-0-295-98084-3.
- Charles Edenshaw. London UK: Black Dog Publishing. 2013. ISBN 978-1-908966-20-9. Edited with Daina Augaitis and James Hart.
- In the Spirit of the Ancestors:Contemporary Northwest Coast Art at the Burke Museum. Burke Museum and University of Washington Press. 2015. ISBN 978-0-295-99521-2. Edited with Kathryn Bunn-Marcuse
- Skidegate House Models: From Haida Gwaii to the Chicago World's Fair and Beyond. Native Art of the Pacific Northwest: a Bill Holm Center Series. Seattle: University of Washington Press. 2024. ISBN 978-0-295-75105-4. Full access available to users of The Wikipedia Library.
