= Chief Shakes Historic Site =

- U.S. National Register of Historic Places
- Alaska Heritage Resources Survey
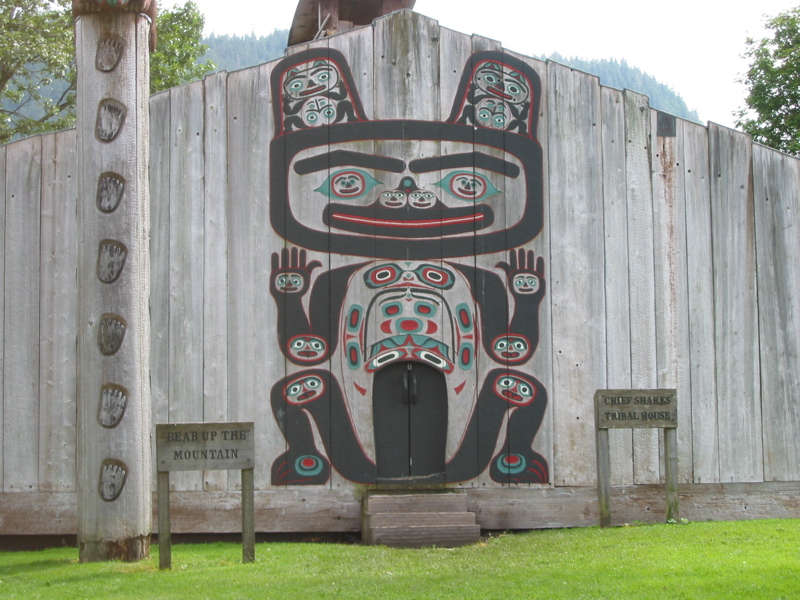

- Location within Alaska
- Location: Shakes Island, inside Wrangell Harbor, Wrangell, Alaska
- Coordinates: 56°27′57″N 132°22′50″W
- Area: 0.704 acres (0.285 ha)
- Built: 1940
- Architect: Civilian Conservation Corps
- NRHP reference No.: 70000918
- AHRS No.: PET-010
- Added to NRHP: October 27, 1970

The Chief Shakes Historic Site is a historic collection of original and recreated Native Alaskan artifacts. It is located on Shakes Island, inside Wrangell Harbor, Wrangell City and Borough, Alaska. The most prominent feature of the site is a 1940 reconstruction of a Tlingit community house. This structure incorporates six original house posts, carved poles similar to totem poles. The house posts, four of which are from the community house of Chief Shakes, a line of like-named Tlingit clan leaders, are reported to be among the oldest known to survive. The house was surrounded by seven totem poles, two of which are original Tlingit work, and five of which are copies created by crews of the Civilian Conservation Corps that also built the house. One of these totem poles, the Three Frogs pole, was removed in 2024.

The site was listed on the National Register of Historic Places in 1970.

== See also ==
- National Register of Historic Places listings in Wrangell, Alaska
