= Edward L. Keithahn =

American ethnographer and writer

- Born: Edward Linnaeus Keithahn; May 15, 1900; Tenino, Washington
- Died: September 26, 1970 (aged 70); Eugene, Oregon
- Occupations: Ethnographer, museum curator, schoolteacher, writer
- Spouse: Toni (m. 1923)

Edward Linnaeus Keithahn (May 15, 1900 – September 26, 1970) was an American museum curator and the author of a well known book on totem poles, Monuments in Cedar, published in 1945. According to WorldCat, the book is held in 725 libraries.

He became interested in totem poles at the Alaska–Yukon–Pacific Exposition in Seattle in 1909 and later traveled to southeast Alaska and eventually lived there. He lived and taught in native villages for about 15 years, and became working "in the Indian service," as he put it (meaning perhaps employment with the Bureau of Indian Affairs), living mainly among the Tlingit and Haida people.

He was Curator and Librarian at the Alaska Historical Library and Museum from 1941.

== Bibliography ==
- Monuments in Cedar. Ketchikan, Alaska: Roy Anderson. 1945
- Monuments in Cedar. Seattle: Superior Pub. Co, 1963. (Expanded edition)
- Alaskan Igloo Tales. Anchorage: Alaska Northwest Pub. Co, 1974.
- (with George A. Ahgupuk). Igloo Tales. Lawrence, Kansas: U.S. Indian Service, 1950.
- Eskimo Adventure: Another Journey into the Primitive. Seattle: Superior Pub. Co, 1963.
- "Stone Artifacts of Southeastern Alaska". American Antiquity, 28(1), 66–77. 1962 http://doi.org/10.2307/278079
- Alaska for the Curious. Seattle: Superior Pub. Co, 1966.
