= Alaska State Museum =

Museum in Juneau, Alaska

Coordinates: 58°18′01″N 134°24′56″W

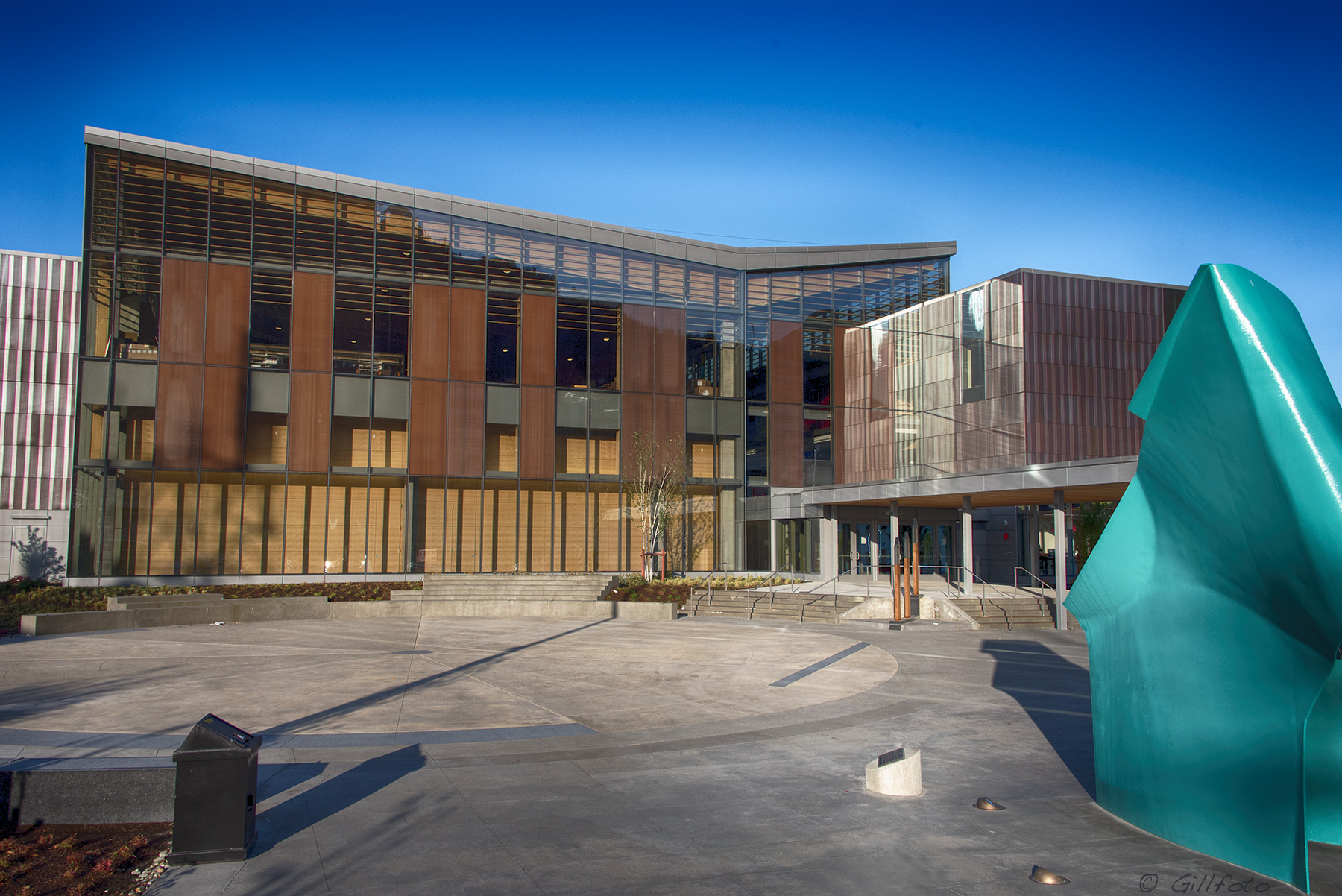
The front entrance of the new Father Andrew P. Kashevaroff (APK) Building that houses the Alaska State Museums, Alaska State Archives and Alaska State Library.

The Alaska State Museum is a museum in Juneau, Alaska, United States. It was established in 1900 to collect both the human and natural history of Alaska. The museum was moved to a new building after a $139 million refurbishment, reopening in 2016.

== Collections ==
The museum's collections include cultural materials from the people of the Northwest Coast (Tlingit, Haida and Tsimshian), the Athabascan cultures of Interior Alaska, the Inupiaq of the north coast, and the Yup'ik of the southwest of Alaska, the Alutiiq people of Prince William Sound and Kodiak Island, and the Unangax from out along the Aleutian chain. Artifacts from the state's Russian colonial eras, state and political history, fine art (including contemporary art), natural history, industry and trades can also be found on exhibit.

Although the collection was established in 1900, it had no permanent home for 20 years, and was stored in a number of locations, with varying amounts of public access. Its first permanent home was in the Arctic Brotherhood Hall in Juneau. The museum outgrew this building some time in the 1940s, however it was not until 1972 that a new purpose built facility was built, and by this time the collection had grown significantly. This building, designed by Linn A. Forrest, was demolished in August 2014, and a new facility opened on the same footprint (but larger), on June 6, 2016, after a $139 million renovation. The museum closed temporarily on February 28, 2014, for the creation of a new facility that joined the State Libraries, Archives and Museum (SLAM) together in a comprehensive research facility. The new building was named after the first curator for the Alaska State Museum, the Russian Orthodox priest, Father Andrew P. Kashevaroff. This building is also known as the APK.
