= Walter Wright (oral historian) =

Walter George Wright
- Died: 1949
- Citizenship: Canadian
- Occupation: Historian

Walter George Wright (died 1949) was a Canadian hereditary chief of the Tsimshian from the community of Kitselas, near Terrace, British Columbia, whose extensive knowledge of oral history was published posthumously in book form as Men of Medeek.

== Niistaxo'ok ==
Wright held the name Niistaxo'ok, an hereditary name-title associated with chieftainship of the House of Niistaxo'ok, the clan Gispwudwada (Killerwhale clan) house-group (or matrilineal extended family) of the Gits'ilaasü (a.k.a. Kitselas) tribe. In the Prologue to Men of Medeek he summarized his chiefly position as follows:

"I have 'Power' on both sides of The Big Canyon [i.e. the Kitselas Canyon]. On the right hand side I have the power of my Chieftainship. For many generations Neas-D-Hok [i.e. Niistaxo'ok] has had that right. On the left hand side I carry the 'Power' of Neas Hiwas, for in my generation there is no Chief of that name."

This is a reference to Niishaywaaxs, a house-chief name belonging to another Kitselas Gispwudwada house from the other side of Kitselas Canyon. Niishaywaaxs had also been held by Wright's grandfather, whom he credited with teaching him the oral histories recorded in the book.

Wright was a river-boat pilot on the Skeena River, helming the Hudson's Bay Company sternwheelers, Mount Royal and Hazelton, work he performed until his eyesight began to fail. In later years he was blind. He was also an Envoy in the Salvation Army.

== Men of Medeek ==
Wright dictated Men of Medeek to Will Robinson, a local justice of the peace, in 1935–36, but it was not published until 1962, after Wright and Robinson had both died. The oral clan histories (adawx) he tells include narrations of the coming of the Gispwudwada people to Kitselas Canyon and intersect with the exploits of Tsimshian Laxsgiik (Eagle clan) chiefs such as Ligeex of the Gispaxlo'ots and Gitxon of Kitselas. The word "medeek" (midiik) is the Tsimshian word for grizzly-bear, one of the crests ("totems") of Wright's branch of the Gispwudwada. (Medeek (a.k.a. McDeek) Avenue in Terrace is so named because of Wright's totemic affiliation.)

Wright also recorded narratives in the 1920s and later with the trained Tsimshian ethnologist and chief William Beynon.

== Family ==
Wright had seven sisters, whose marriages were arranged so as to create matrikin and potential heirs (matrilineal nephews) in a variety of surrounding First Nations communities that figure in the adawx told in Men of Medeek, including Hartley Bay, Lax Kw'alaams, and Kitamaat. (Wright's obituary referred to him as originally "hailing from Kitimaat," though we know the key parts of his ancestry were Kitselas.) One sister, Eliza, married Tom Thornhill, the first white settler in the Kitselas area. Wright died November 14, 1949, at the purported age of 84 years, although when he dictated Men of Medeek (1935–36) he gave his age as 65. Other sources put his age at death as 104. A newspaper report on his funeral services identified "the new chief of the Kitselas people," Wright's picked successor, as Wright's sister's son, Walter Nyce, of Kitamaat, B.C.

== Chiefly succession ==
According to another account of the chiefly succession, Wright, late in life, visited his sister Rhoda Wright Bates, a Hartley Bay resident, at a Skeena River cannery where she was performing seasonal labour and asked that his matrilineal great-great-nephew Clarence Anderson, her grandson, then 14 years old, be taken "back with him to be trained," also prearranging Clarence's eventual marriage; Anderson eventually succeeded to the name Niistaxo'ok. (This version is from a published account by Anderson's wife, the anthropologist Margaret Seguin Anderson and daughter Tammy Anderson Blumhagen.)

Will Robinson's will urged his family to publish the remaining portion of the Wright manuscript, titled Wars of Medeek. This proviso was forgotten until Robinson's granddaughter Enid DuPuis rediscovered Robinson's papers. Another grandchild, Barry Robinson, then contacted Glenn Bennett, Chief Councillor of the Kitselas Band, and was put in touch with Wright's grandson, Ralph Wright, himself a former Chief Councillor who had remembered hearing the stories orally from his grandfather. A limited edition comprising both Men of Medeek and Wars of Medeek was published by Barry Robinson in 2003 and gifted to the Kitselas Nation along with some 50 presentation books given to the Chiefs and dignitaries. All the original documentation and copyrights were given to the Kitselas Nations in 2003 by Barry Robinson.

== Bibliography ==
- Anderson, Margaret Seguin, and Tammy Anderson Blumhagen (1994–1995) "Memories and Moments: Conversations and Re-Collections." B.C. Studies, no. 104, pp. 85–102.
- Asante, Nadine (1972) The History of Terrace. Terrace, B.C.: Terrace Public Library Association.
- Barbeau, Marius (1950) Totem Poles. (2 vols.) (Anthropology Series 30, National Museum of Canada Bulletin 119.) Ottawa: National Museum of Canada. Reprinted, Canadian Museum of Civilization, Hull, Quebec, 1990.
- "Chief Walter Wright Dead" (obituary), Omineca Herald (Terrace, B.C.), November 16, 1949, p. 1.
- Duff, Wilson (1997) "Will Robinson's Men of Medeek" (reprinted). In Pioneer Legacy: Chronicles of the Lower Skeena River, Volume 1, ed. by Norma V. Bennett, pp. 140–141. Terrace, B.C.: Dr. R. E. M. Lee Hospital Foundation.
- Lang, Jennifer (2003) "A History Lesson," Terrace Standard, October 29, 2003.
- "Last Rites for Native Chief," Omineca Herald, November 23, 1949, p. 8.
- Robinson, Will (1962) Men of Medeek. As told by Walter Wright. Kitimat, B.C.: Northern Sentinel Press.
- Wright, Walter (1992) "Gits'ilaasü and Control of the Skeena River Trade Route." Recorded in 1950 [sic]. In Na Amwaaltga Tsmsiyeen: The Tsimshian, Trade, and the Northwest Coast Economy, ed. by Susan Marsden, pp. 76–84. (Suwilaay'msga Na Ga'niiyatgm, Teachings of Our Grandfathers, vol. 1.) Prince Rupert, B.C.: First Nations Advisory Council of School District #52.
