= Giluts'aaw =

The Giluts'aaẅ (properly spelled with an umlaut over the w), also spelled Gilutsau, are one of the 14 tribes of the Tsimshian nation in British Columbia, Canada, and one of the nine of those tribes making up the "Nine Tribes" of the lower Skeena River resident at Lax Kw'alaams (a.k.a. Port Simpson), B.C. The name Giluts'aaw means literally "people of the inside" (referring to their traditional village site behind a small island on a slough along the Skeena). Their traditional territory is the area around Lakelse Lake, near present-day Terrace, B.C., at the Skeena River.

Since 1834, they have been based at Lax Kw'alaams, when a Hudson's Bay Company fort was established there. When the village around the fort was laid out into tribal "neighborhoods," the Giluts'aaw were the one tribe situated on the shore east of the fort rather than to the west.

However, one Giluts'aaw house-group (extended matrilineal family), the House of Niskiimas (belonging to the Ganhada or Raven clan), has members who are today associated with the Kitsumkalum community.

In the late nineteenth century the chieftainship of the Giluts'aaw was held by Victoria Young, a key convert of Lax Kw'alaams's Methodist missionary Thomas Crosby. She succeeded to the Giluts'aaw Gispwudwada (Killerwhale clan) name-title Niisłgümiik of the House of Niisłgümiik, Giluts'aaw's leading royal house, when no male heirs were available. However, despite marrying a holder of the Gispaxlo'ots chieftainship Ligeex, she bore no children and after her death in 1898 the name Niisłgümiik was bequeathed to a brother's son of a different clan whom she had adopted into the Gispwudwada. This person may be Herbert Swanson, whom the anthropologist Marius Barbeau described in 1950 as having been, in 1915, the holder of Niisłgümiik, living at Metlakatla, B.C.

In 1915 the anthropologist Marius Barbeau photographed what remained of a "Prince of the Grizzlies" totem pole belonging to the Giluts'aaw Gispwuwada House of Niisnawaa at Lax Kw'alaams.

The anthropologist Viola Garfield reported in 1938 that the Giluts'aaw was at that point in the situation of having two chiefs. One, Niisnawa, was likely, she wrote, to see his line die out with him as he had no heirs. The second, Niisłgümiik, i.e. Victoria Young's nephew, Garfield considered a "subchief" to Niisnawa.

In 1935 William Beynon recorded that Giluts'aaw people in Lax Kw'alaams included 29 members of the Gispwudwada (Killerwhale clan) and 2 members of the Ganhada (Raven). Another house-group, with no members during this period, was the House of Laa'is, of the Laxgibuu (Wolf) clan.

== Prominent Giluts'aaws ==
- Frederick Alexcee, artist
- Victoria Young, chieftainess
- Shannon Thunderbird, Artist/Educator

== Bibliography ==
- Barbeau, Marius (1950) Totem Poles. 2 vols. (Anthropology Series 30, National Museum of Canada Bulletin 119.) Ottawa: National Museum of Canada.
- Garfield, Viola E. (1939) "Tsimshian Clan and Society." University of Washington Publications in Anthropology, vol. 7, no. 3, pp. 167–340.
- McDonald, James A. (2003) People of the Robin: The Tsimshian of Kitsumkalum. CCI Press.
- Neylan, Susan (2001) The Heavens Are Changing: Nineteenth-Century Protestant Missions and Tsimshian Christianity. Montreal: McGill-Queen’s University Press.
