= Terry Starr =

Tsimshian Nation artist

Terry Starr is a Tsimshian Nation artist from the Gispaxlo'ots tribe of British Columbia, Canada.

== Early years ==
Starr's mother was from Kitsumkalum of the Eagle Clan, and his father was from Lax Kw'alaams, or the town of Port Simpson of the Killerwhale clan. His predominant family crest is the Eagle on his mother's side, while his sub crest is the Killerwhale on his father's.

Alu'-Alums or 'Crying for or longing after something or someone' Starr was given this childhood name when he was six years old by the Chief of the Tribe when his grandfather died. Thla-enak or 'It's been a long time' - his adult name was given to him by the acting Chief when Starr returned to the village after a long absence.

== Career ==
Subsequent to completing a college business course in 1982, Starr purchased two adzes and three knives, his first carving tools. Tim Paul of the Nuu-chah-nulth Nation and Richard Hunt of the Kwakwaka’wakw people were among the first to influence Starr on the basic techniques of carving wood. Their ancestral styles greatly influence the artwork that he creates today. In 1984, he sat and learned carving techniques from Richard Hunt, master Kwagiulth artist at Thunderbird Park and the Royal British Columbia Museum in Victoria, British Columbia.

Starr is best known for his masks reflecting the traditional pigments and form lines of his ancestry. He usually paints only a portion of his masks to deliberately reveal the fluid grain of the wood. His pieces can be found in many local and international collections. For example, the Paul and Joan Gluck Collection of Native Arts contains more than 200 art pieces collected for more than 20 years and is considered one of the largest in the world. Starr was featured in an exhibit at one of the largest historical museums in the United States, the Historical Museum of Southern Florida.

On two separate occasions Starr has been contracted to construct a full-scale replicas of a traditional Tsimshian bighouse. For both of these projects, he was responsible for hiring and training a crew of carvers. One was for the Canadian Museum of Civilization in Gatineau, Quebec, and the other was onsite at the Port Simpson village where he grew up.

== Selected exhibitions ==
- 1987 Hands of Creation, Inuit Gallery, Vancouver, BC
- 1989 Masks: An Exhibition of Northwest Coast Masks, Inuit Gallery, Vancouver, BC
- 1990 Painted Drums of the Northwest Coast, Inuit Gallery, Vancouver, BC
- 1993 Changing Faces, Stonington Gallery, Seattle, WA
- 1994 Life of the Copper: A Commonwealth of Tribal Nations, Alcheringa Gallery, Victoria, BC
