= Morgan Asoyuf =

Ts'msyen artist from British Columbia

- Born: Morgan Green; 1984 (age 41–42); Prince Rupert, British Columbia
- Occupations: Artist and craftsperson

Morgan Asoyuf (born in 1984, née Green) is a Ts'msyen artist from Prince Rupert, British Columbia. She is Eagle Clan from the Lax Kw’alaams community. A multidisciplinary artist, Asoyuf works primarily in goldsmithing, jewelry, gem-setting, and engraving.

== Artwork ==
Asoyuf has apprenticed with Haida mixed-media artist Richard Adkins and Tsimshian multidisciplinary artist Henry Green. She also attended the Vancouver Metal Art School, where she studied under German metalworker Gerold Mueller.

In 2019, Asoyuf exhibited the photography series Royal Portrait, a series contemplating Indigenous northwest coast ideals and featuring "frontline activists working on issues like climate justice, missing and murdered Indigenous women, and protesting the expansion of the Trans Mountain pipeline." The portraits depicted community leaders and activists wearing Asoyuf's fine jewelry, predominantly headdresses, including frontlets, aigrettes, and crowns, made of mixed materials. The exhibit was shown at the Bill Reid Gallery in Vancouver from October 2019 until January 2020.

Asoyuf's work has also been showcased during Vancouver Indigenous Fashion Week in 2019.

== Published books ==
Black and White: Visual Stimulation For Babies (2017) is a board book of high-contrast images "designed to stimulate brain growth and visual development in young babies" using traditional Pacific Northwest Coast imagery.

Learning My Rights with Mousewoman (2021) is a board book geared to preschool-aged children that uses the legendary figure of "Mousewoman" (a well-known personage in the mythology of Haida and Tsimshian peoples) to introduce children to the concept of inherent rights.

== Activism and advocacy ==
Asoyuf created a T-shirt design for Orange Shirt Day, which was featured on the website Vancouver Is Awesome. Orange Shirt Day, also known as the National Day for Truth and Reconciliation, commemorates victims and survivors of the Canadian residential school system. In 2021, the unmarked graves of several hundred children were discovered on the former grounds of defunct residential schools in British Columbia, Manitoba, and Saskatchewan. Asoyuf's design, featuring the words Every Child Matters, "shows 'two eagles holding around like a heart; this depicts protecting with love.'" Net proceeds from sales of the shirt benefitted the Orange Shirt Society and the BC Aboriginal Child Care Association.
