= Gitando =

The Gitando are the youngest (or last to form) of the 14 tribes of the Tsimshian people in British Columbia, Canada. It is one of the nine of those tribes making up the "Nine Tribes" First Nation of the lower Skeena River resident at Lax Kw'alaams (a.k.a. Port Simpson), British Columbia. The name Gitando means the people of weirs. Their traditional territory includes the watershed of the Exstew River, a tributary of the Skeena River. Since 1834, the Gitando have been based at Lax Kw'alaams, following establishment of a Hudson's Bay Company trading fort there. They are closely related to the Gispaxlo'ots, another of the Nine Tribes, who have an adjacent territory.

== History and government ==
The Tsimshian have a matrilineal kinship system, with property and inheritance passed through the maternal line. The chieftainship of the Gitando resides with the hereditary name-title Sgagweet, the holder of which is chief of the House of Sgagweet, a Laxsgiik (Eagle clan) house-group (or extended matrilineal family).

In 1938 American anthropologist Viola Garfield reported that the title name was derived from chief Paul Sgagweet, who died in 1887 and was commemorated by a 15-foot totem pole marble headstone representing one of his most prominent crests, the "Standing Feeding Beaver." The totem pole still stands in the village of Lax Kw'alaams in the 21st century. Paul Sgagweet bequeathed the name to his first cousin or sister's son, Alfred Dudoward.

Dudoward was instrumental in establishing a Methodist mission at Lax Kw'alaams. Dudoward had no (matrilineal) heirs and so adopted his own son and a niece into the house. The son inherited the name Sgagweet after Dudoward's death in 1914 or 1915. He was holding the chief's position and title when Garfield was writing in 1938. He had designated the niece's son as his successor. But this son, named Clarence Watson, moved to Southern British Columbia and accepted the Canadian franchise, which at the time required him to surrender his native status.

After that, the chieftainship was held in trust by the sons of Alfred Dudoward. The youngest, Charles Dudoward (Chief Wiishakes), gave the responsibility to his first cousin's son, Libby Kelly. From Libby the names were passed to his nephews Mitch and Fred Dudoward. But, the name Sgagweet has never been assigned to anyone since Alfred Dudoward.

== Houses and clans ==
In 1935 William Beynon recorded that Gitando people in Lax Kw'alaams included 14 members of the Gispwudwada (Killerwhale clan) (1 house-group), 17 members of the Ganhada (Raven) (1 house-group), and 25 members of the Laxsgiik (Eagle) (2 house-groups, including the House of Sgagweet, with 5 members).

George Kelly was a member of the House of Sgagweet. He was adopted into the Gispaxlo'ots in order to perpetuate the House of Ligeex, a house closely related to Sgagweet.

The anthropologist Marius Barbeau, in a survey of totem poles, described several poles belonging to various Gitando Laxsgiik houses which had stood in Lax Kw'alaams. One, a Sgagweet pole depicting a Standing Beaver, stood until at least 1947.

In addition to the House of Sgagweet, other Gitando houses include:

- Gilasgamgan—Laxsgiik (Eagle clan)
- Gistaaku—Laxsgiik (Eagle)
- Gamayaam—Gispwudwada (Killerwhale)
- Niisxłoo—Laxsgiik (Eagle)
- 'Nluulax—Laxsgiik (Eagle)

There were ten houses in total in the early 20th century. But infectious disease epidemics and migration decimated the population of the Gitanndo and most tribes of the Tsimshian. In the early 21st century, some six families occupy four houses of the Gitando: i) House of Sgagweet ii) House of Gilasgamgan & Gistaaku iii)House of Geyshluk (from Gamayaam)
