= Gitwilgyoots =

The Gitwilgyoots are one of the 14 tribes of the Tsimshian nation in British Columbia, Canada, and one of the nine of those tribes making up the "Nine Tribes" of the lower Skeena River resident at Lax Kw'alaams (a.k.a. Port Simpson), B.C. The name Gitwilgyoots means literally "people of the place of kelp." Their traditional territory includes several areas around the estuary of the Skeena River. Since 1834, they have been based at Lax Kw'alaams, when a Hudson's Bay Company fort was established there.

The chieftainship of the Gitwilgyoots resides in the hereditary name-title Saxsa'axt. The anthropologist Viola Garfield recorded in 1938 that the holder of Saxsa'axt at that point had succeeded his mother's brother, in accordance with matrilineal rules of succession, and had held office for more than thirty years. In the 1930s the House of Saxsa'axt was the largest house-group (matrilineal extended family) in Lax Kw'alaams. A totem pole belonging to this house, portraying an anthropomorphous grizzly bear, was raised in the 1870s and was by the 1930s still standing but decayed beyond recognition.

In 1935 William Beynon recorded that Gitwilgyoots people in Lax Kw'alaams included 49 members of the Gispwudwada (Killerwhale clan) (three house-groups, including the House of Saxsa'axt with 22 members), 1 member of the Ganhada (Raven), 10 members of the Laxgibuu (Wolf) (1 house), and 23 members of the Laxsgiik (Eagle) (1 house).

== Houses and Clans by rank of the Gitwilgyoots ==
House of Sax'sa'axt (Gispwudwada) (Currently headed by family of Bud Dudoward)

House of Yahaan (Gispudwada) Don Wesley

In Lak'agyet

House of La'dox (Ganhada) (Currently headed by Bill Sampson)

House of Ha'litkwa (Laxsgiik)Larry McKay

House of Wuts'int (Gispqudwada)empty

House of Algomxa (Ganhada)Murray Smith

House of Lu'g'ol (Laxsgiik)Carl Sampson

House of Niis'Amaga (Gispwudwada) (Currently headed by family of Ronald Wesley)

House of Legisgago' (Ganhada) (Currently headed by Harvey Russell JR.)

House of Gilaxa'ks (Gispwudwada)Ken Bryant

House of Kwusax'sa'loks (Laxsgiik)

House of Gwunba (Ganhada)

House of Wi'o'nemo'lk (Ganhada)

House of Wai'yii (Laxgyibuu) (Currently Headed by family of Ben Hughes)

House of Gwus'awa'l (Laxgyibuu) (Currently headed by Ken Lawson)

House of T'emga'osemtkwa (Ganhada)

== Bibliography ==
- Garfield, Viola E. (1939) "Tsimshian Clan and Society." University of Washington Publications in Anthropology, vol. 7, no. 3, pp. 167–340.
