= Henry W. Tate =

Henry Wellington Tate (c. 1860 – 1914) was a Canadian oral historian from the Tsimshian First Nation, best known for his work with the anthropologist Franz Boas.

Little is known of his early life in Lax Kw'alaams (a.k.a. Port Simpson), B.C. He was probably the son of Arthur Wellington Clah, an hereditary chief and prominent early Christian convert who had taught the Tsimshian language to the Anglican lay missionary William Duncan in the 1850s.

In 1903 Boas wrote to Clah, on the recommendation of his Tlingit-Kwakwaka'wakw informant George Hunt, expressing an interest in finding someone with whom to work on a description of Tsimshian culture. Clah turned the correspondence over to Tate, and Tate began to send Boas information, especially transcribed oral narratives, through the mail. It seems certain that Boas and Tate never met face to face. The result was Boas's long 1916 monograph Tsimshian Mythology. When that volume appeared, Boas wrote in its preface that "Mr. Tate died in April 1914."

One of the few insights into Tate's life in Tsimshian Mythology comes in a discussion of clan-to-clan adoption, citing Tate's adoption from the Laxsgiik (Eagle clan) into the Gispwudwada (Killerwhale clan) of the Gispaxlo'ots tribe by his maternal grandfather, and his subsequent adoption of his own daughter into the Gispwudwada as well.

Boas and Tate's correspondence is housed at the American Philosophical Society in Philadelphia. It includes complaints by Boas that Tate is resisting his instructions by writing the stories in English first, and then translating into his own Tsimshian, instead of transcribing his informants' Tsimshian first.

In the 1930s, Tate's widow, now known as "Mrs. Sam Bennett," of the Gits'iis tribe, served as a key informant to the anthropologist Viola Garfield during her fieldwork in Lax Kw'alaams.

Aspersions were cast on the reliability or thoroughness of Tate's work by a 1917 review of Tsimshian Mythology written by Marius Barbeau, who had by then done much more extensive, face-to-face fieldwork in Lax Kw'alaams with Clah's grandson, William Beynon. The literary historian Ralph Maud has written at length on the complicated give-and-take which resulted in the publication of Tate's stories and the possible cultural distortions that resulted. Maud has also produced a volume which reformats Tate's stories to bring out the poetry in his English.

== Bibliography ==
- Barbeau, Marius (1917) Review of Tsimshian Mythology by Franz Boas. American Anthropologist (new series), vol. 19, no. 4, pp. 548–563.
- Boas, Franz (1916) "Tsimshian Mythology." In Thirty-First Annual Report of the Bureau of American Ethnology to the Secretary of the Smithsonian Institution,, pp.. Washington: Government Printing Office.
- Garfield, Viola E. (1939) "Tsimshian Clan and Society." University of Washington Publications in Anthropology, vol. 7, no. 3, pp. 167–340.
- Maud, Ralph (2000) Transmission Difficulties: Franz Boas and Tsimshian Mythology. Burnaby, B.C.: Talonbooks.
- Roth, Christopher F. (2001) Review of Transmission Difficulties by Ralph Maud. Anthropologica, vol. 43, no. 1, pp. 123–124.
- Tate, Henry Wellington (1993) The Porcupine Hunter and Other Stories: The Original Tsimshian Texts of Henry Tate. Ed. by Ralph Maud. Vancouver, B.C.: Talonbooks.
