= Ginaxangiik =

The Ginaxangiik are one of the 14 tribes of the Tsimshian nation in British Columbia, Canada, and one of the nine of those tribes making up the "Nine Tribes" of the lower Skeena River resident at Lax Kw'alaams (a.k.a. Port Simpson), B.C. The name Ginaxangiik means literally "People of the Hemlock" though some sources translate the name to "People of the Flies/Mosquitoes." Their traditional territory includes the watershed of the Exchamsiks River, a tributary of the Skeena River. Since 1834, they have been based at Lax Kw'alaams, when a Hudson's Bay Company fort was established there.

The leadership of the Ginaxangiik resided once in the hereditary name-title 'Alamlaxha and by the early nineteenth century in the hereditary name Txagaaxs. Later, the name 'Wiiseeks, a name belonging to the same royal Gispwudwada (Killerwhale clan) house-group (extended matrilineal family) as 'Alamlaxha and Txagaaxs, became the leading name. The anthropologist Viola Garfield reported that Albert McMillan held 'Wiiseeks in the 1890s and was thus chief of the Ginaxangiik. McMillan bequeathed the name to a sister's son, who died in 1935 and was succeeded by his brother, a previous holder of 'Alamlaxha. Garfield added in 1938 that in the previous century the Ginaxangiik tribe had had eight tribal chiefs.

Garfield has described how in 1929 a holder of the name 'Alamlaxha held a potlatch feast at which a flagpole was erected in lieu of a totem pole, in an attempt to move away from traditional forms.

In 1935 William Beynon recorded that Ginaxangiik people in Lax Kw'alaams included 41 members of the Gispwudwada (Killerwhale clan) (4 house-groups) and 10 members of the Ganhada (Raven) (1 house-group).

The one Ginaxangiik Ganhada house-group in the 1930s was the House of Midiiks. It was headed at the time by Mark Luther, who held the name Midiiks and was a key informant during Garfield's fieldwork. Some of the last living members after Mark Luther were, Robert Sampson, and George Henry, George died in January 1938, and Robert passed some years before. However, well before Robert Sampson died he adopted his three children into the house; William, Matilda, and Elizabeth. Of this adoption five male heirs were the result, the last of which died in 2002. In 2008 a matrilineal descendant of the house returned to Lax Kw'alaams and the house again has members.

A Laxgibuu (Wolf clan) house of the Ginaxangiik, the House of Halaaydmgan (meaning "Dancing Wood") was extinct by the late 1950s, though a totem pole belonging to this house, representing a shaman, was erected about 1880 and according to Garfield was "one of the finest carved figures still [in 1938] standing in Port Simpson."

Ginaxangiik houses include:

- House of 'Wiiseeks/Taax Gaaxs—Gispwudwada (Killerwhale clan) (leading house)
- House of 'Liyaa'mlaxha—Gispwudwada (Killerwhale clan)
- House of Halaaydmgan—Laxgibuu (Wolf clan)
- House of Gwishawaal—Laxgibuu (Wolf Clan)
- House of Midiiks—Ganhada (Raven clan)

== Prominent Ginaxangiiks ==
- Kate Dudoward, hereditary leader, wife of Alfred Dudoward, mother of Charles
- Charles Dudoward, hereditary chief, merchant, world-renowned artist, son of Alfred & Kate, uncle of Fred Sr.
- Fred Dudoward Sr., Hereditary Chief (R.I.P.)
- Garry Reece Sr., Hereditary Chief

== Sources ==
- Barbeau, Marius (1950) Totem Poles. 2 vols. (Anthropology Series 30, National Museum of Canada Bulletin 119.) Ottawa: National Museum of Canada.
- Garfield, Viola E. (1939) "Tsimshian Clan and Society." University of Washington Publications in Anthropology, vol. 7, no. 3, pp. 167–340.
- Helin, Calvin (2006) Dances with Dependency: Indigenous Success through Self-Reliance. Vancouver: Orca Spirit Publishing and Communications.
- Reece, Scott (2002) holder of the title Midiiks of Ginaxangiik.
