= Peggy Brock =

Australian historian (1948–2023)

Margaret Susan "Peggy" Brock AM FASSA (16 March 1948 – 30 May 2023) was an Australian historian and writer. Her major areas of interest were colonial and Indigenous history in Australia, the Pacific and parts of Canada and Africa, with particular interest in Australian Aboriginal women. Her work continues to be cited in national and international debates over Indigenous policy. Born in Adelaide, she took up academic positions and was at the end of her career emeritus professor at Edith Cowan University in Perth, Western Australia.

== Early life and education ==
Margaret Susan Brock was born in Adelaide, South Australia on 16 March 1948. Her parents, Frank and Ilse, were Austrian and German Jews, who had moved to the UK in the 1930s after being persecuted for their socialist beliefs. After migrating to Australia, they were brought together during World War II by their shared experiences and German accents, being treated as aliens. Frank became a businessman and Ilse a physiotherapist.

Brock grew up in Netherby and Hazelwood Park, and went to school at what was then and was educated at Presbyterian Girls' College, now Seymour College.

She studied at the University of Adelaide, where she was awarded a B.A.(Hons) in 1969 (and later a PhD).

She travelled widely in her twenties, mainly in Europe.

== Early career ==
Brock initially became a high school teacher, but was led to leave teaching after a student asked her why they were studying Henry VIII and she found that she could not answer that question.

After a stint working for the South Australian Government as a planner for the proposed but later abandoned city of Monarto, she became the first historian in the South Australian Aboriginal Heritage Unit in the Department of Environment and Planning during the 1980s. She started helping Aboriginal communities to write about what happened to their peoples after the colonisation of Australia, using techniques which she had developed herself. These brought her attention both nationally and globally. She focussed particularly on women, whose roles in their communities had been ignored by previous scholars.

== Academic career ==
After her husband, Norman Etherington, was appointed to history chair at the University of Western Australia in 1989, Brock was working on her doctorate at the University of Adelaide, which was awarded in 1992. Moving to Perth, she approached the recently established Edith Cowan University, which at the time had few staff for their new Department of Aboriginal and Intercultural Studies.

After being appointed to Edith Cowan, she gained successive promotions, leading ultimately to a professorial position there in 2007. She was appointed as a visiting fellow at the University of Basel, Switzerland (2003) and the Institute of Commonwealth Studies, London University (2005).

The family returned to Adelaide in 2010, with Brock continuing her research as a visiting research fellow, funded by Australian Research Council grants, and continued to contribute to books and studies. She became emeritus professor in the School of Arts and Humanities at Edith Cowan University.

== Publications ==
In 1985, while working for the Aboriginal Heritage Unit in SA, she published her first work, which was based on her work with the Adnyamathanha people of the Northern Flinders Ranges. Yura and Udnyu: A History of the Adnyamathanha of the North Flinders Ranges [Wakefield Press, 1985 and 2023]

This research led to another major publication, Women Rites & Sites. Aboriginal Women's Cultural Knowledge, an edited collection of referenced essays based on original reports to the Aboriginal Heritage Unit by herself and seven other non-Aboriginal women expert in this area (Catherine Berndt, Catherine J. Ellis, Linda Barwick, Helen Payne, Jen Gibson, Jane M. Jacobs, and Luise Hercus), with an additional concluding chapter on the southern region of South Australia written by Fay Gale, a long-established academic researcher of Aboriginal people, to complete an overview of the whole State. The aim of Women Rites & Sites was to demonstrate and correct the cultural bias and gender blindness of previous research on Aboriginal cultural life. It is an early example of new understandings of Australian Indigenous history and culture that began to emerge in the 1980s following Henry Reynolds’ The Other Side of the Frontier: Aboriginal Resistance to the European Invasion of Australia (1981), a controversial history of relations between Aboriginal Australians and European settlers, which has been marked as the beginning of the History Wars.

Soon after, Brock contributed to the Historical Background to the South Australian Report of the Royal Commission into Aboriginal Deaths in Custody (1990), and native title claims in South Australia have often cited her research.

Her next major work was a collaborative work with Doreen Kartinyeri, on the history of Poonindie Mission on Eyre Peninsula (Poonindie: The Rise and Destruction of an Aboriginal Agricultural Community (1989).

Her third book was Outback Ghettoes. A History of Aboriginal Institutionalisation and Survival (1993), which also focused on South Australia, while the next, Words and Silences. Aboriginal Women, Politics and Land (2001) continued her focus on Indigenous women but in the wider Australian context.

She spent 15 years researching, transcribing, and writing a major work published in 2011, The Many Voyages of Arthur Wellington Clah: A Tsimshian Man on the Pacific Northwest Coast. She found and assembled the memoirs of a First Nations Canadian (Tsimshian) man, Arthur Wellington Clah, written between the 1850s and 1900s.

Her other books, Indigenous Peoples and Religious Change and Indigenous Evangelist and Questions of Authority in the British Empire 1750-1940), also go beyond the Australian context.

== Recognition and honours ==
Brock was elected a Fellow of the Academy of the Social Sciences in Australia in 2005, and has held visiting fellowships at the University of Basel, Switzerland (2003) and the Institute of Commonwealth Studies, London University (2005).

In the 2021 Queen's Birthday Honours Brock was appointed a Member of the Order of Australia for "significant service to tertiary education, and to Indigenous history".

== Personal life ==
Brock married Norman Etherington, whom she met as a lecturer in history at Adelaide University, and they had two sons. Nathan and Ben.

== Death and legacy ==
Brock died of cancer on 30 May 2023. She was survived by her husband, sons, and grandchildren. Scarlett and Harriet Etherington

In all she wrote or edited nine books, of which six were about Aboriginal South Australians. She contributed much to the body of knowledge of colonial and Indigenous history in Australia, the Pacific, and parts of Canada and Africa, particularly Aboriginal women. Her work continues to be cited in national and international debates over Indigenous policy.

== Major works ==
- Yura and Udnyu: A History of the Adnyhamathanaha of the North Flinders Ranges Wakefield Press, 1985 and 2022].
- Women Rites & Sites. Aboriginal women's cultural knowledge (Allen & Unwin (Australia), 1989)
- With Kartinyeri, D., Poonindie: The Rise and Destruction of an Aboriginal Agricultural Community (1989)
- Outback Ghettos. A History of Aboriginal Institutionalisation and Survival (1993)
- Words and Silences. Aboriginal Women, politics and land (2001, 2003)
- Indigenous Peoples and Religious Change (2005)
- The Many Voyages of Arthur Wellington Clah: A Tsimshian Man on the Pacific Northwest Coast, Vancouver (2011)
- With Etherington, N., Griffiths, G., & Van Gent, J., Indigenous Evangelists and Questions of Authority in the British Empire 1750-1940 (2015)
- With Tom Gara (eds.) Colonialism and its Aftermath, A history of Aboriginal South Australia (Wakefield Press, 2017)
