= Kitsumkalum =

Kitsumkalum is one of the 14 tribes of the Tsimshian nation in British Columbia, Canada. Kitsumkalum and is also the name of one of their Indian Reserve just west of the city of Terrace, British Columbia, where the Kitsumkalum River flows into the Skeena River. Archaeological evidence places Kitsumkalum with property holdings (laxyuup/territories) in the Kitsumkalum Valley, down the Skeena River to the coast, the Zymagotitz River, areas around Lakelse Lake and many special sites surrounding coastal and inland areas of the North West Coast prior to 1846 and as far back as 5,000 years BP.

The name Kitsumkalum, originally Gitsmgeelm, derives from the Tsimshian git- (people of) and -geelm, referring to riffles formed by shallow water running over rocks in the Kitsumkalum River.

The following house-groups (extended matrilineal families) make up the Kitsumkalum tribe, according to McDonald (see bibliography):

- House of Ligiudziiws – Ganhada (Raven clan) (currently headed by Lena Land)
- House of Łagaax & 'Wiidildal – Gispwudwada (Killerwhale clan) (currently headed by Alex Bolton)
- House of Niisgankwadzeks – Laxsgiik (Eagle clan)
- House of Niisgeel—Laxsgiik (Eagle clan headed by Richard Miller)
- House of Wudiwiye & Wüneeymhapiskw – Laxgibuu (Wolf clan) (currently headed by family of Vera Henry)
- House of Xpilaxha—Ganhada (Raven clan) (currently headed by Gerald Wesley)

Of these, the House of Nisgeel represents the first human inhabitants of the Kitsumkalum valley, under the leadership of Nisgeel, according to an oral history (adawx) belonging to this house.

Traditionally, the main Kitsumkalum village was situated at Dałk Gyilakyaw or "Robin Town," at the Canyon of the Kitsumkalum River. This site has not been occupied since the 1930s. Another village, home of the Ganhada and Laxgibuu, was Gitxondakł, situated between the Canyon and Kalum Lake. Modern Kitsumkalum village, a third site, is right on Highway 16 where the Kitsumkalum River flows into the Skeena. The population of the community in 1983 was 74.

McDonald also lists the following house-groups from other Tsimshian tribes whose members are associated with the Kitsumkalum community:

- House of Gitxon/Nisgitloop – Kitselas tribe (currently headed by Wilfred Bennett of Kitselas)
- House of Niiskiimas – Giluts'aaw tribe of Lax Kw'alaams
- House of Niishaywaaxs – Kitselas tribe (matriline of Charlotee Guno and Stewart Bolton)
- House of Spooxs – Gispaxlo'ots tribe of Lax Kw'alaams
- House of Sats'aan—Ganhada (Raven clan) Kitselas House

From the 1870s until the 1960s, many Kitsumkalum and Kitselas Tsimshians lived at the cannery town of Port Essington, farther down the Skeena River (now a ghost town), at the confluence of the Ecstall and Skeena Rivers.

A significant event in the modern revival of traditional culture at Kitsumkalum was the "Su-Sit'aatk" double totem pole raising feast of 1987. The poles were carved by the Haida carver Freda Diesing, with the assistance of a team from Kitsumkalum, including Dorothy Horner, Myrtle Laidlaw, Sandra Wesley, Vernon Horner, and Norman Guno, Lorraine McCarthy.

== Bibliography ==
- Inglis, Gordon B., et al. (1990) "Tsimshians of British Columbia since 1900." In Handbook of North American Indians, Volume 7: Northwest Coast, pp. 285–293. Washington: Smithsonian Institution.
- McDonald, James A. (1983) "An Historic Event in the Political Economy of the Tsimshian: Information on the Ownership of the Zimacord District." B.C. Studies, no. 57, pp. 24–37.
- McDonald, James A. (1987) The Marginalization of the Tsimshian Cultural Ecology: The Seasonal Cycle." In Bruce Cox (ed.), Native Peoples, Native Lands, Carleton Library Series. Ottawa: Macmillan. pages 109–218.
- McDonald, James A. (1984) "Images of the nineteenth century economy of the Tsimshian". In Margaret Seguin (ed.), The Tsimshian Images of the Past, Views from the Present. Vancouver: U.B.C. Press. pages 40 54.
- McDonald, James A. (1988) "Su-sit' Aatk, the raising of two crest poles marked a new beginning for the people of Kitsumkalum". Rotunda 21:2:19-25. Toronto: Royal Ontario Museum.
- McDonald, James A. (1990) "Bleeding day and night: the construction of the Grand Trunk Pacific Railway across Tsimshian reserve lands". Canadian Journal of Native Studies. vol. 10 No. 1 pp 33–69.
- McDonald, James A. (1990) "Poles, potlatching, and public affairs, the use of aboriginal culture in development". Culture. Vol X No 2 pp 103–120.
- McDonald, James A. (1994) "Building a moral community for the 21st century: Tsimshian potlatching, implicit knowledge, and everyday experiences." Cultural Studies 9(1):125–144
- McDonald, James A. (1994) "Social change and the creation of underdevelopment: a northwest coast case". American Ethnologist 21:1: 152–175.
- McDonald, James A. (2003) People of the Robin: The Tsimshian of Kitsumkalum. CCI Press.
- McDonald, James A. (2004) "The Tsimshian." In Mark Nuttal (ed.) Encyclopedia of the Arctic. New York: Routledge.
- McDonald, James A. (2005) Cultivating in the Northwest: Gleaning the evidence from the Tsimshian." Keeping it Living: Traditions of Plant Use and Cultivation on the Northwest Coast of North America, edited by Nancy Turner and Doug Deur. University of Washington Press.
- McDonald, James A. (2006) "Robin Town: An Ethnohistorical Return to Robin Town on the Kitsumkalum Canyon". Living Landscapes, Royal British Columbia Museum.
- Stewart, Hilary (1993) Looking at Totem Poles. Vancouver, B.C.: Douglas & McIntyre.
