= Phil Gray =

Phil Gray may refer to:

- Phil Gray (footballer)
- Phil Gray (politician)
- Phil Gray (artist)

== See also ==
- Philip Gray, Irish republican and revolutionary
