= Arthur Wellington Clah =

Chief of the Tsimshian people (1831–1916) in British Columbia, Canada

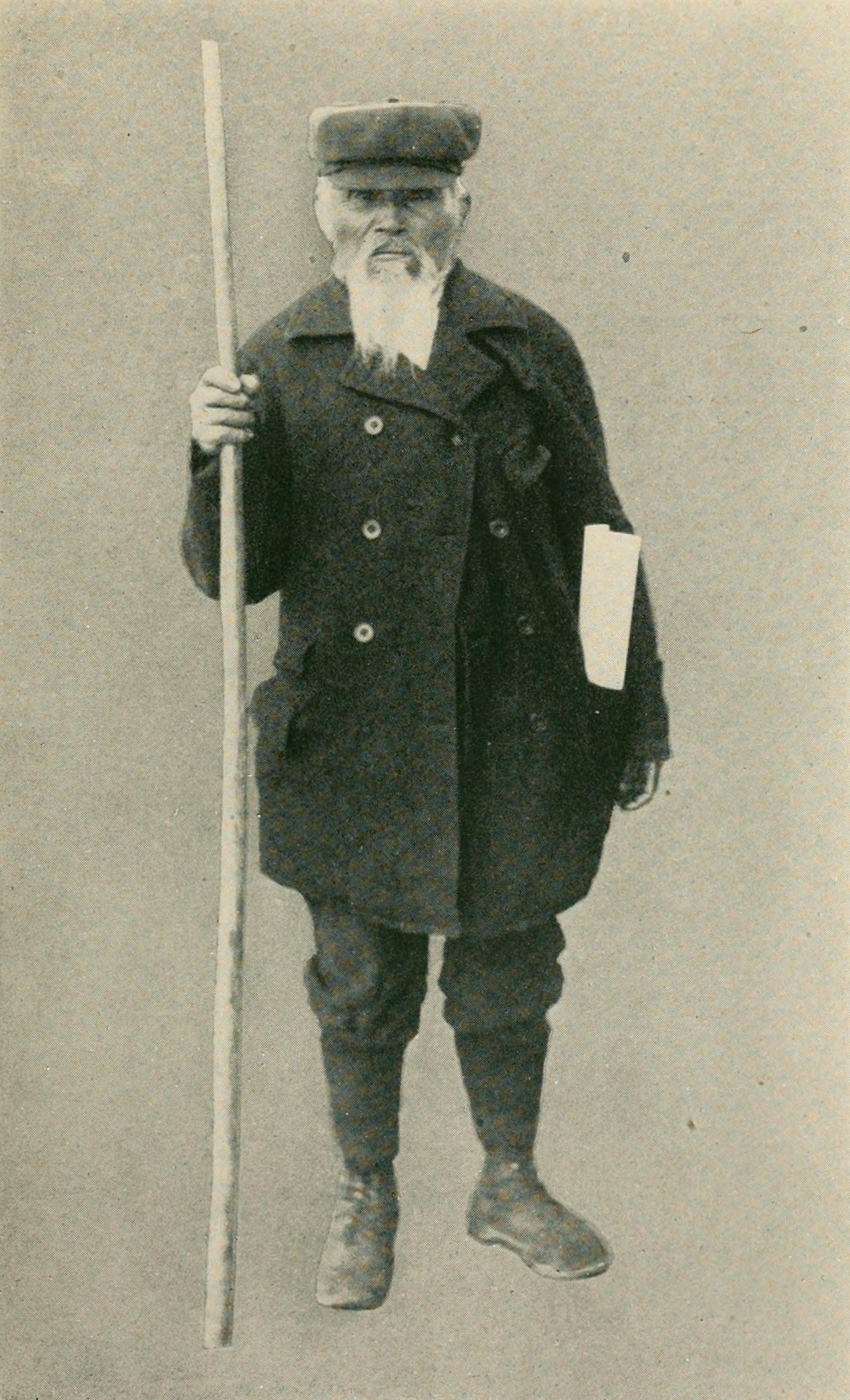
Arthur Wellington Clah

Arthur Wellington Clah (1831–1916) was a Canadian First Nations employee of the Hudson's Bay Company at Lax Kw'alaams (Port Simpson), B.C., known for having written extensive journals detailing his life and that of others in the settlement in the late 19th century. He was a hereditary chief in the Tsimshian nation, an anthropological informant, and a Methodist missionary.

Arthur Wellington was his English name. "Clah" is a spelling of one of his hereditary Tsimshian names, Ła'ax. He also held the name T'amks, which carries with it leadership of a matrilineal house-group of the same name in the Gispaxlo'ots, one of the "Nine Tribes" of Lax Kw'alaams.

Clah was born in 1831 at a settlement called "Laghco," near where the Hudson's Bay Company established Fort Simpson at Lax Kw'alaams in 1834. He married Catherine (a.k.a. Dorcas) Datacks, of the Laxgibuu (Wolf clan) of the Nisga'a nation. Catherine was niece of the wife of W. H. McNeill, the HBC's chief trader at Fort Simpson. Clah began working as McNeill's house servant but gradually came to be a trader in his own right.

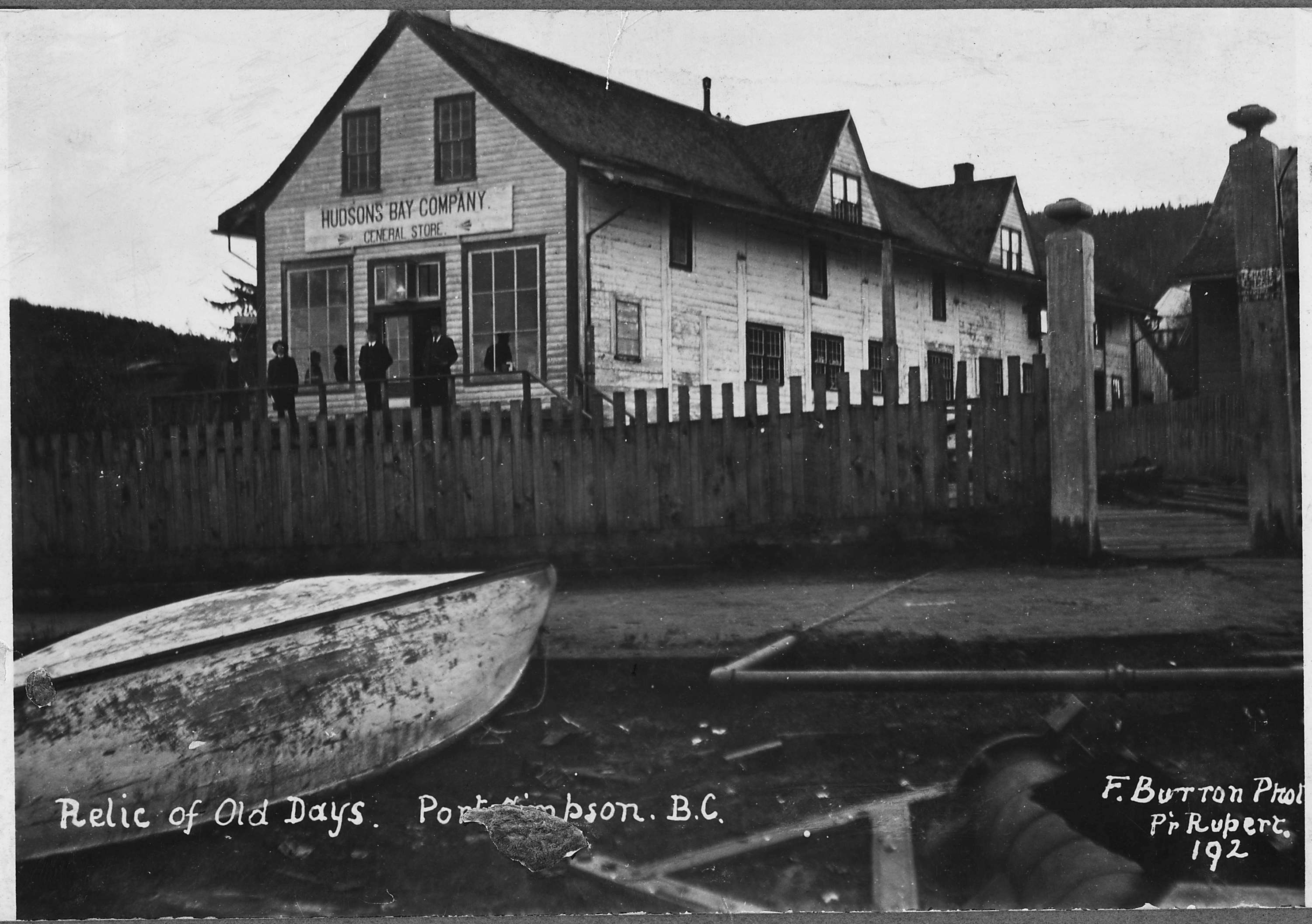
Hudson's Bay post at Lax Kw'alaams

When the Anglican lay minister William Duncan arrived in Port Simpson in 1857, Clah taught him the Tsimshian language in exchange for instruction in English, a mutual education which began through the medium of Chinook Jargon. Clah also became a mediary between Duncan and the Tsimshian. Clah converted to Christianity but never entirely abandoned potlatching. In a famous incident, Clah intervened and saved Duncan's life when Clah's own tribal chief, Ligeex, ordered Duncan at gunpoint (some versions say knifepoint) to cease tolling churchbells on the day of his (Ligeex's) daughter's initiation into a Tsimshian secret society. Ligeex later became a key convert of Duncan's. This incident is described both by Clah himself and by an eyewitness, his nephew the Rev. William Henry Pierce, the Methodist missionary.

For nearly fifty years, from the late 1850s until his death, Clah kept a remarkably detailed diary, which is now housed by the Wellcome Library in London.

In 1903 the anthropologist Franz Boas wrote to Clah, having been referred to him by his Tlingit-Kwakwaka'wakw informant and collaborator George Hunt, expressing an interest in recording Tsimshian culture. Eventually, Clah turned the correspondence over to Henry W. Tate—who, indications are, was his own son—which led to the first detailed descriptions of Tsimshian culture. In 1915 Clah, near death, served as informant to the anthropologist Marius Barbeau, who was collecting information on Tsimshian social organization. Clah's grandson, William Beynon, served as interpreter and facilitator and went on to become a renowned ethnographic fieldworker in his own right.

Clah died in Lax Kw'alaams in 1916.

Australian historian Peggy Brock spent 15 years researching and transcribing Clah's journals, and in 2011 published her major work The Many Voyages of Arthur Wellington Clah: A Tsimshian Man on the Pacific Northwest Coast.
