= Ginadoiks =

One of the 14 tribes of the Tsimshian nation in British Columbia, Canada

The Ginadoiks (sometimes called Gitnadoiks) are one of the 14 tribes of the Tsimshian nation in British Columbia, Canada, and one of the nine of those tribes making up the "Nine Tribes" of the lower Skeena River resident at Lax Kw'alaams (a.k.a. Port Simpson), B.C. The name Ginadoiks means literally "people of the rapids". Their traditional territory is the watershed of the Gitnadoiks River, a tributary of the Skeena. Since 1834, they have been based at Lax Kw'alaams, when a Hudson's Bay Company fort was established there.

== History ==
The anthropologist Viola Garfield wrote in 1938 that the then-current head chief of the Ginadoiks, Cecil Ross, Niisweexs ("Grandfather of Weexs"), had come from the Tsimshian community of Kitkatla three generations earlier "when his 'brother' usurped his place and took the ... chieftainship" of the Kitkatla tribe. The leading, royal house of the Ginadoiks had become extinct, allowing the Kitkatla man to accede to the name Niisweexs. He was succeeded by a "house 'nephew'", who was in turn succeeded by his sister's son, in accordance with rules of matrilineal succession. One of these last two Niisweexses was Henry Nelson, who died in 1925 and whose mortuary rites are described in detail in Garfield's monograph.

In 1935 William Beynon recorded that Ginadoiks people in Lax Kw'alaams included 2 members of the Gispwudwada (Killerwhale clan) (i.e. the House of Niisweexs), 7 members of the Ganhada (Raven) (two house-groups, including the House of Niisganaas, with only 2 members), and 18 members of the Laxgibuu (Wolf) (one house-group).

One holder of the name Niisganaas, and therefore head of the House of Niisganaas, was Lewis Gray (c. 1857–1934), was a key informant of Garfield's during her 1932 fieldwork season. He was a shaman whose fame had spread as far as the Nass River, his supernatural gifts having been evident at his birth since he had been born with a caul. Since he had no matrilineal heirs, shortly before his death he adopted his own wife into his house-group as his sister so that she could inherit the prerogatives of the House of Niisganaas.

== Houses ==
Houses of the Ginadoiks include:

- House of Niisganaas – Ganhada (Raven clan)
- House of Niisweexs – Gispwudwada (Killerwhale clan)
- House of Sats'aan – Laxgibuu (Wolf clan)
