= Exchamsiks River =

River in British Columbia

- Mouth of the Exchamsiks River

Location
- Country: Canada
- Province: British Columbia
- District: Range 5 Coast Land District

Physical characteristics
- Source: Kitimat Ranges
  - coordinates: 54°36′44″N 129°36′19″W
  - elevation: 547 m (1,795 ft)
- Mouth: Skeena River
  - coordinates: 54°19′54″N 129°17′44″W
  - elevation: 12 m (39 ft)
- Length: 58 km (36 mi)
- Basin size: 514 km^{2} (198 sq mi),
- Discharge
  - average: 62.4 m^{3}/s (2,200 cu ft/s)
  - maximum: 864 m^{3}/s (30,500 cu ft/s)

Basin features
- Topo map: NTS103I6 Salvus

The Exchamsiks River is a right bank tributary of the Skeena River in northwestern part of the province of British Columbia, Canada.

From its source in the Kitimat Ranges of the Coast Mountains the Exchamsiks River flows southeast for about 58 km (36 mi) to empty into the Skeena River in Exchamsiks River Provincial Park and the Exchamsiks River Protected Area.

The Exchamsiks River's drainage basin covers 514 km^{2} (198 sq mi). The river's mean annual discharge is estimated at 62.4 m^{3}/s (2,200 cu ft/s), with most of the flow occurring between May and October. According to the stream gauge "08EG012 Exchamsiks River Near Terrace", the Exchamsiks' maximum recorded instantaneous discharge was 864 m^{3}/s (30,500 cu ft/s), on 1 November 1978.

The Exchamsiks watershed's land cover is classified as 33.8% barren, 22.8% snow/glacier, 17.4% conifer forest, 9.3% herbaceous, and small amounts of other cover. The Exchamsiks River is glacially-turbid and moderately braided, and drains an essentially pristine watershed. The mouth of the Exchamsiks River is located about 50 km (31 mi) west of Terrace, British Columbia, 53 km (33 mi) northwest of Kitimat, about 68 km (42 mi) east of Prince Rupert, British Columbia, and about 430 km (270 mi) northwest of Prince George, British Columbia.

The Exchamsiks River's drainage basin lies within the asserted traditional territory of the Tsimshian Ginaxangiik First Nations people. The lower Exchamsiks River basin contains many Tsimshian archaeological sites.

== Geography ==
The Exchamsiks River originates as glacial meltwater on the west side of Mount Hodgkinson, east of Carm Peak, in the Kitimat Ranges. Its headwaters lie just south of the sources of the Khutzeymateen River and the Kateen River, and Khutzeymateen Provincial Park. The Exchamsiks River flows south and southeast, collecting numerous unnamed tributary streams. As it nears the Skeena River the Exchamsiks flows through the Exchamsiks River Protected Area, then the smaller Exchamsiks River Provincial Park at the Exchamsiks–Skeena confluence. British Columbia Highway 16, which runs along the north side of the Skeena River, crosses the Exchamsiks River just above its mouth. Canadian National Railway tracks also cross the river next to the highway.

== See also ==
- List of rivers of British Columbia
