= Charles Menzies =

Charles Menzies may refer to:

- Charles Menzies (anthropologist), Canadian anthropologist
- Charles Menzies (Royal Marines officer) (1783–1866), Scottish soldier and founder of Newcastle, New South Wales
