= Asdiwal =

Asdiwal is a Native American mythological figure and son of Ho, who makes him special “snow shoes” for him. Asdiwal chases a white bear up a mountain only to discover that the white bear is really the daughter of the Sun and marries her, from the beliefs of the Tsimshian people, Indigenous peoples of the Pacific Northwest Coast. Franz Boas first wrote about the myth in an anthropological context.
