= Ka-Ha-Si =

Ka-Ha-Si or Duk-Toothl ("Black Skin") is a character in the mythology of the Tsimshian and Tlingit peoples of the Pacific Northwest Coast of North America.

In myth, Ka-Ha-Si holds up the earth, and earthquakes are a result of him adjusting his grip.
