= William Henry Pierce (missionary) =

Canadian missionary

- Born: 1856; Fort Rupert, British Columbia, Canada
- Died: 1948 (aged 91–92)
- Other names: W. H. Pierce
- Citizenship: Canadian

William Henry Pierce (1856–1948), also known as W. H. Pierce, was a Canadian First Nations missionary for the Methodist church and a member of the Tsimshian nation in northwestern British Columbia. He is best known for his memoir, From Potlatch to Pulpit, which was the first published book by a Tsimshian.

Pierce was born June 10, 1856, at Fort Rupert, B.C. His father was a Scotsman named Edward Pierce who worked for the Hudson's Bay Company at Lax Kwʼalaams (a.k.a. Port Simpson, a.k.a. Fort Simpson), B.C., and his mother was a Tsimshian of the Gispaxlo'ots tribe from Port Simpson who died when he was three weeks old. His maternal grandfather brought him from Fort Rupert to Port Simpson, where he was raised in Tsimshian culture. His "uncle by adoption" was the HBC employee and diarist Arthur Wellington Clah, and young William witnessed the famous event in which Clah intervened and saved the life of the Anglican lay missionary William Duncan, whose life was being threatened by Chief Ligeex of the Gispaxlo'ots, angry that church-bells were tolling on the day of his daughter's initiation into a secret society.

During a stay in Victoria, British Columbia, Pierce was converted to Christianity by the Methodist missionary the Rev. Thomas Crosby and later served as his interpreter when Crosby was assigned to Port Simpson. This led to Pierce's own career as a missionary. First informally and then formally after his ordination in 1886, Pierce worked to convert Natives and suppress indigenous customs (like the potlatch and secret societies) in B.C. coastal villages such as Alert Bay, Bella Bella, Port Essington, Greenville, and Klemtu, and even Wrangell, Alaska. Pierce was missionary at Kispiox for fifteen years starting in 1895, and in 1910 was transferred to Port Essington, where he served until his retirement in 1933. Thereafter he lived in Prince Rupert, B.C.

In 1876 Crosby married Pierce to a Haida woman named Emma Leusate. In 1890 he married again, to Margaret Hargraves, an Englishwoman who was a teacher at the Methodist mission school in Port Essington.

His book From Potlatch to Pulpit, published in 1933, contains memoirs of his life and conversion as well as substantial information about traditional Tsimshian customs, beliefs, and seasonal round.

Pierce died in 1948.

== Bibliography ==
- Hare, Jan, and Jean Barman (2006). Good Intentions Gone Awry: Emma Crosby and the Methodist Mission on the Northwest Coast. Afterword by Caroline Dudoward. Vancouver: UBC Press.
- Large, R. Geddes (1957; updated ed., 1981). The Skeena: River of Destiny. Sidney, B.C.: Gray's Publishing Co.
- Neylan, Susan (2003). The Heavens Are Changing: Nineteenth-Century Protestant Missions and Tsimshian Christianity. Montreal: McGill-Queen's University Press.
- Pierce, William Henry (1933). From Potlatch to Pulpit, Being the Autobiography of the Rev. William Henry Pierce. Ed. by J. P. Hicks. Vancouver, B.C.: Vancouver Bindery.
