= Frederick Alexcee =

Frederick Alexcee (1853 – 1940s) was a Canadian carver and painter from the community of Lax Kw'alaams with Tsimshian ethnicity.

Alexcee (his last name has also been spelled Alexie, Alexee, etc.) was born in Lax Kw'alaams, then known as Fort Simpson, in 1853. His father was an Iroquois laborer from eastern Canada who was in the employee of the Hudson's Bay Company at Fort Simpson. His mother was Tsimshian from the Giluts'aaw tribe, one of the "Nine Tribes" from the lower Skeena River area based at Lax Kw'alaams. In the matrilineal system of the Tsimshian, Alexcee followed his mother as a Giluts'aaw and as a member of the Gispwudwada (Killerwhale clan or phratry). His Tsimshian name was 'Wiiksmwan, meaning Great Deer Woman.

Alexcee was trained as a halaayt carver, with "halaayt" denoting shamanic practices traditionally reserved for chiefs. He crafted naxnox (spirit) paraphernalia and items for use in "secret society" ceremonies. These practices were among those targeted for eradication by late-19th-century missionaries in Lax Kw'alaams. Alexcee also carved for the Indian curio trade and produced paintings and drawings depicting traditional life in Port Simpson. In 1927, two of his paintings were exhibited at the National Gallery of Canada.

He carved human figures to adorn a baptismal font in Port Simpson's Methodist church.

He died some time in the 1940s.

Works of his can be found at the Museum of Anthropology at UBC and the University of British Columbia Library's Rare Books and Special Collections in Vancouver, the Museum of Northern British Columbia in Prince Rupert, the New Westminster Museum and Archives, the Royal British Columbia Museum in Victoria, the Burke Museum of Natural History and Culture in Seattle, United States, and the Wellcome Collection in London, England.

== Bibliography ==
- Barbeau, Marius (1945) "Frederick Alexie: A Primitive." Canadian Review of Music and Art, vol. 3, no. 11/12.
- Hawker, Ronald William (1991) "Frederick Alexie: Euro-Canadian Discussions of a First Nations Artist." Canadian Journal of Native Studies, vol. 11, no. 2, pp. 229–252.
- Hawker, Ronald W., "Transformed or Transformative? Two Northwest Coast Artists in the Era of Assimilation" in American Indian Culture and Research Vol. 25, No. 2 (2001), 37–61.
- Hawker, Ronald W. Tales of Ghosts: First Nations art in British Columbia, 1922–61. Vancouver: UBC Press, 2003.
- Hill, Charles C. (2006). "The 1927 Exhibition of Canadian West Coast Art: Native and Modern". Emily Carr. Vancouver: Douglas & McIntyre. p. 112. ISBN 978-1-55365-173-4.
- McCormick, Kaitlin A. "Neither One nor the ‘Other’": The Unique Oeuvre of Frederick Alexcee. Unpublished Masters’ Thesis. Ottawa: Carleton University Faculty of Arts and Sciences, 2010.
- Simmons, Diedre. "Frederick Alexcee, Indian Artist (c. 1857 to c. 1944)" The Journal of Canadian Art History. 14 (1 August 1992).

== Other publications featuring work by Alexcee ==
- MacDonald, George F., and John J. Cove (eds.) (1987) Tsimshian Narratives. Collected by Marius Barbeau and William Beynon. (Canadian Museum of Civilization Mercury Series, Directorate Paper 3.) 2 vols. Ottawa: Directorate, Canadian Museum of Civilization.
- MacDonald, George F. (1984) "Painted Houses and Woven Blankets: Symbols of Wealth in Tsimshian Art and Myth." In The Tsimshian and Their Neighbors of the North Pacific Coast, ed. by Jay Miller and Carol M. Eastman, pp. 109–136. Seattle: University of Washington Press.
- Marsden, Susan (ed.) (1992) Suwilaay'msga Na Ga'niiyatgm, Teachings of Our Grandfathers. 7 vols. Prince Rupert, B.C.: First Nations Advisory Council of School District #52.
- Neylan, Susan (2003) The Heavens Are Changing: Nineteenth-Century Protestant Missions and Tsimshian Christianity. Montreal: McGill-Queen's University Press.
