= Alfred Dudoward =

Alfred Dudoward (c. 1850 – November 15, 1914) was a Canadian hereditary chief from the Tsimshian nation, who was instrumental in establishing a Methodist mission in his community of Port Simpson (a.k.a. Fort Simpson, a.k.a. Lax Kw'alaams), B.C.

Dudoward was a member of the Gitando tribe, one of the nine Tsimshian tribes based in Lax Kw'alaams. His mother was Mrs. Elizabeth Lawson (d. 1903), who held the hereditary name Diiks and was also known as Elizabeth Diex. Alfred was of mixed Native and white ancestry, his father having been Félix Dudoire/Dudouaire, a French Canadian tailor in the employ of the Hudson's Bay Company at Fort Simpson. The spelling of the son's name was anglicized, reflecting the dominance of English speakers in the area.

Dudoward succeeded to his maternal uncle Paul Sgagweet's hereditary name-title Sgagweet in 1887 upon his uncle's death, in accordance with the rules of matrilineal succession. This established him as chief of the Gitando tribe.

In 1871 Dudoward married Mary Catherine, later known as Kate Dudoward. She was the daughter of a Tsimshian mother and a non-Native customs officer named Holmes. Kate's mother had been killed in 1870 in an ambush en route from Victoria, B.C., to Lax Kw'alaams. She was traveling there to assume a chieftainship for which there was no male heir. Kate had assumed the chieftainship instead.

Dudoward's own mother Elizabeth Diex was referred to by one missionary as "the mother of Methodism among the Tsimpshean tribes." Diex was converted to Christianity in Victoria in 1873 during a mass revival targeting First Nations people for conversion. After Elizabeth Diez's son, Alfred Dudoward, arrived in a large war canoe to express his displeasure at this mass conversion, he converted as well.

After returning home, Kate and Alfred organized religious instruction in Lax Kw'alaams. They lobbied the Methodist church to establish a mission there, which they eventually did in 1874, under the Rev. Thomas Crosby.

Repeated conflicts between their practice of traditionalism and Christianity led Crosby to suspend the Dudowards' membership in the church several times. The couple quit the church and joined the Salvation Army in 1895.

Because Dudoward had no (matrilineal) heirs, he adopted his own son and a niece into the House of Sgagweet in order to perpetuate the line. The son inherited the name Sgagweet and held it in 1938, when the anthropologist Viola Garfield recorded the house's order of succession. Sgagweet had already his cousin's (niece of his father) son as his successor.

His children included the carver Charles Dudoward.

== Bibliography ==
- Bolt, Clarence (1992) Thomas Crosby and the Tsimshian: Small Shoes for Feet Too Large. Vancouver: UBC Press.
- Garfield, Viola E. (1939) "Tsimshian Clan and Society." University of Washington Publications in Anthropology, vol. 7, no. 3, pp. 167–340.
- Hare, Jan, and Jean Barman (2006) Good Intentions Gone Awry: Emma Crosby and the Methodist Mission on the Northwest Coast. Afterword by Caroline Dudoward. Vancouver: UBC Press.
- Neylan, Susan (2003) The Heavens Are Changing: Nineteenth-Century Protestant Missions and Tsimshian Christianity. Montreal: McGill-Queen's University Press.
