= Gits'iis =

The Gits'iis are one of the 14 tribes of the Tsimshian nation in British Columbia, Canada, and one of the nine of those tribes making up the "Nine Tribes" of the lower Skeena River resident at Lax Kw'alaams (a.k.a. Port Simpson), B.C.

== Overview ==
The name Gits'iis means literally "people of the seal trap." Their traditional territory includes the areas around the Khutzeymateen Inlet and Work Channel, between Lax Kw'alaams and Kincolith, B.C. Since 1834, they have been based at Lax Kw'alaams, when a Hudson's Bay Company fort was established there.

The chieftainship of the Gits'iis resides with the Ganhada (Raven-clan) hereditary name-title Niisyaganaat and the royal house-group (extended matrilineal family) of the same name. The current Niisyaganaat is Lawrence Helin, uncle to the author Calvin Helin. Both William Beynon and the anthropologist Viola Garfield describe in their writings of a potlatch feast held circa 1930 for the death of Herbert Wallace, who had held Niisyaganaat. An earlier chief of the Gits'iis, according to Garfield, had been one Abraham Lincoln, named not for the U.S. president but for an employer named Lincoln and for the biblical Abraham.

The artist Bill Helin is described as a member of the Gits'iis tribe.

== Houses of the Gits'iis ==
- House of Asagalyaan -- Laxgibuu (Wolf clan)
- House of Dago'milsk—Ganhada (Raven)
- House of Łüüm—Ganhada (Raven)
- House of 'Wiilaxha—Gispwudwada (Killerwhale)

The House of Łüüm and the House of Dago'milsk are two other Ganhada house-groups of the Gits'iis tribe. A totem pole belonging to Dago'milsk, depicting a sea lion with gun in his mouth, was still standing (with the gun having fallen away) in Lax Kw'alaams in the 1930s.

== Sources ==
- Barbeau, Marius (1950) Totem Poles. 2 vols. (Anthropology Series 30, National Museum of Canada Bulletin 119.) Ottawa: National Museum of Canada.
- Beynon, William (1992) "The Feast of Nisyaganaat, Chief of the Gitsiis." In Na Amwaaltga Tsmsiyeen: The Tsimshian, Trade, and the Northwest Coast Economy, ed. by Susan Marsden, pp. 45–54. (Suwilaay'msga Na Ga'niiyatgm, Teachings of Our Grandfathers, vol. 1.) Prince Rupert, B.C.: First Nations Advisory Council of School District #52.
- Garfield, Viola E. (1939) "Tsimshian Clan and Society." University of Washington Publications in Anthropology, vol. 7, no. 3, pp. 167–340.
- Helin, Calvin (2006) Dances with Dependency: Indigenous Success through Self-Reliance. Vancouver: Orca Spirit Publishing and Communications.
