= Phil Gray (artist) =

Canadian artist

Phil Gray (born March 15, 1983) is a Canadian artist who specializes in wood carvings (masks, poles, sculptures and drums) from the Tsimshian and Mikisew Cree communities. His work uses traditional technique and features imagery from legends. In 2014, Gray was awarded a British Columbia Creative Achievement Award in Aboriginal Art from the Government of British Columbia.

== Early life and education ==
Gray was born in Vancouver in 1983.

In 1999, he began carving with Lower Nicola First Nations artist, Gerry Sheena. He also had the opportunity to study Advanced Design under acclaimed Haida artist, Robert Davidson (artist). He works primarily in cedar, alder and boxwood. He creates masks, panels, poles, sculptures and drums. He belongs to the Killerwhale (Gispwudwada) Clan and the majority of his works are created in his traditional Tsimshian style.

== Artistic work ==
Gray's work includes carving totem poles, painting bentwood boxes, and making cedar masks. In September 2003, he had three of his pieces donated to the Burke Museum in Seattle, Washington. In 2005, he was featured in the Changing Hands: Art Without Reservation 2 exhibit at the Museum of Arts and Design in New York. In the winter of 2007, he completed a large commission of sculptural works for Sonora Resort on Sonora Island, BC. Also in 2007, he completed the Northwest Coast Jewellery Arts Program at the Native Education College in Vancouver, under Kwakwaka’wakw and Haida artist, Dan Wallace.

His painted drum entitled Eclipse, completed in 2007, is on display at the Canadian Museum of History.

== Exhibitions ==
Gray was included in two major exhibitions in 2009. The first was the Challenging Traditions exhibition at Ontario's McMichael Canadian Art Collection, a show that was dedicated to exploring innovative and experimental works from the Northwest Coast. The second was Continuum: Vision and Creativity on the Northwest Coast at Vancouver's Bill Reid Gallery, which highlighted 23 established Indigenous artists from British Columbia, Washington State and Alaska. In September 2009, he completed a pair of large red cedar doors, later displayed at Lattimer Gallery, which depicted a Grandmother Moon design. In February 2010, Gray designed the helmet of gold medal-winning skeleton racer Jon Montgomery. Montgomery held the helmet throughout the Olympic awards ceremony.
