= William Jeffrey (Tsimshian chief) =

Chief William Jeffrey (1899 - 1995) was a Canadian hereditary Tsimshian Chief, First Nations activist and carver. He attended residential school from 1914 to 1917. Though he desired to be a lawyer, his status as a First Nations person and government policy at the time prevented him from attending college for any profession other than the clergy.

In 1930 he co-founded the Native Brotherhood of British Columbia. "The NBBC advocated improvements to the level of education among Aboriginal peoples, greater recognition in law of their hunting, fishing and logging rights, and the decriminalization of the potlatch." In 1940 he appeared in the House of Commons to further those aims, also delivering the message:

Without any consultation with us, you took away our land and put us on reservations. You gave us religion, and its clergymen burned our totem poles, saying we worshiped them. This was not so, for they were our memorials and our landmarks. You have removed them and stolen our land. You gave us the Bible—there is nothing wrong with the Bible—but you misused it and did not follow it yourselves.

— Awake, September 22, 1984

In 1953, attracted by the message of "peace and justice to peoples of all races, nationalities, creeds and colors," Jeffrey left behind his political pursuits to become a minister of Jehovah's Witnesses.

In 1960 he began carving totem poles and replicas of totem poles, joining a movement to revive the practice of Northwest Coast art once banned in British Columbia. Many of his poles still stand in Prince Rupert and even Adelaide, Australia.

Jeffrey was a native speaker of Smalgyax, a Tsimshian language. He also spoke English and Chinook Jargon.

== See also ==
- List of First Nations people
