= Ligeex =

Ligeex (variously spelled: "Legaic" etc.) is a hereditary name-title belonging to the Gispaxlo'ots tribe of the Tsimshian First Nation from the village of Lax Kw'alaams (a.k.a. Port Simpson), British Columbia, Canada. The name, and the chieftainship it represents, is passed along matrilineally within the royal house (a matrilineally defined extended family) called the House of Ligeex. The House of Ligeex belongs to the Laxsgiik (Eagle clan).

== History ==
Ligeex is considered to be traditionally the most powerful Tsimshian chieftainship. In the period of early European contact, Ligeex controlled Tsimshian trade with peoples up the Skeena River, a privilege he protected through tribute and through war if necessary. His position was eventually weakened as the Hudson's Bay Company rose in influence through the fur trade in the nineteenth century.

The name Ligeex is conventionally described as being of Heiltsuk linguistic origin and as meaning Stone Cliff. Tradition holds that the House of Ligeex is an offshoot of another Gispaxlo'ots Laxsgiik house, the House of Nis'wa'maķ. This is one of the Gwinhuut houses deriving from migrations from Tlingit territory in what is now Alaska. A woman from the House of Nis'wa'maķ was kidnapped by—and wedded to—a Haisla chief from Kitamaat, to the south.

She was subsequently kidnapped from Kitamaat by a Heiltsuk chief from Bella Bella, even farther south, who took her as his wife. They had a son, who inherited from his father, the Heiltsuk chief, the name Ligeex. When the woman and her son were allowed to return to the Gispaxlo'ots, her son retained the name "Ligeex," which was passed through the family's maternal line. It gradually came to stand for the hereditary chief.

It was a Ligeex who married his daughter Sudaał to Dr. John Frederick Kennedy of the Hudson's Bay Company in 1832. This was an arranged diplomatic intercultural marriage to smooth the way for the HBC to establish its Fort Simpson, a.k.a. Port Simpson, at Lax Kw'alaams in 1834, in Ligeex's territory.

The most famous holders of the name were a series of men named Paul Legaic in the late nineteenth century.

HBC employee Arthur Wellington Clah, a Gispaxlo'ots house-group chief, intervened and saved the life of the Anglican lay missionary William Duncan in Lax Kw'alaams. Paul Legaic had ordered Duncan at gunpoint to cease tolling churchbells on the day of the initiation of the chief's daughter's into a Tsimshian secret society. This Ligeex soon became a key convert of Duncan's and took the name Paul at his baptism (he was named for the disciple Paul of Tarsus). This Paul Legaic and his wife and daughter moved with Duncan for a while to the nearby village of Metlakatla, founded by Duncan in 1862 as a utopian Christian community. He wanted to protect his 50 Lax Kw'alaams native followers from the alcohol and loose morals of the H.B.C. fort atmosphere. He briefly appointed Legaic as constable and assigned the chief to work with Tsimshian at Lax Kw'alaams and the Nass River to try to convert more First Nations to people to Christianity. On one such trip in 1869, Legaic died in Lax Kw'alaams.

During her studies of the Tsimshian in the 1930s, the American anthropologist Viola Garfield wrote in 1938 that the last fully installed chief of the original House of Ligeex had been Paul Legaic (d. 1890). He was a successor to the Legaic recorded as converted by Duncan. Paul Legaic II's sister Martha Legaic succeeded him, dying in 1902. At that point the maternal line had run out of heirs. For lack of a consensus among other Gispaxlo'ots over succession, a council of four leading house-group heads administered Gispaxlo'ots affairs for a period.

The council ultimately assigned the Ligeex chieftainship to George Kelly, a member of the House of Sgagweet, the leading, royal Laxsgiik house of the Gitando tribe of Lax Kw'alaams. His house had close historical relations with the House of Ligeex. Kelly had an Anglo white father. He was born at Port Ludlow, Washington and raised in Victoria, B.C., dying in 1933. Garfield in 1938 reported that at that point, a new council had taken over the Gispaxlo'ots leadership. She opined that there would probably never be another Ligeex, although she detailed rival claims for taking over the name and its privileges. For instance a Cape Fox, Alaska, Tlingit family had established itself in Lax Kw'alaams, claiming to be a new House of Nis'wa'maķ.

In Barbeau's survey of totem poles, he reports that a Fin-of-the-Shark pole more than thirty feet in height belonging to Ligeex was erected ca. 1837. In 1950 Barbeau wrote that the eagle figure which topped this pole was still preserved in Lax Kw'alaams. An earlier Fin-of-the-Shark pole had stood at the original Gispaxlo'ots village at the confluence of the Skeena River with the Shames River.

Barbeau also describes an Eagle totem pole belonging to Ligeex which stood in Lax Kw'alaams until falling before 1926. He surmised that it was cut up. This wooden pole had been erected about 1866. It had been typical for slaves to be sacrificed by having the pole erected into a hole on top of them or by being killed first and then buried beneath the pole. In 1866, however, a Nisga'a slave woman and a Haida one were each liberated at the last moment before they could be sacrificed.

In the early 1930s Garfield recorded information on Ligeex and the Gispaxlo'ots. This included phonograph recordings of House of Ligeex songs, from Matthew Johnson, a head of one of the other Gispaxlo'ots house-groups.

A rock painting on a cliffside near the mouth of the Skeena River, visible from Highway 16, depicts traditional copper shields and a human face. This was painted to mark Ligeex's ancient control of the river's trade.

== Bibliography ==
- Barbeau, Marius (1950) Totem Poles. 2 vols. (Anthropology Series 30, National Museum of Canada Bulletin 119.) Ottawa: National Museum of Canada.
- Garfield, Viola E. (1939) "Tsimshian Clan and Society." University of Washington Publications in Anthropology, vol. 7, no. 3, pp. 167-340.
- Marsden, Susan, and Robert Galois (1995) "The Tsimshian, the Hudson's Bay Company, and the Geopolitics of the Northwest Coast Fur Trade, 1787-1840." Canadian Geographer, vol. 39, no. 2, pp. 169-183.
- Neylan, Susan (2003) The Heavens Are Changing: Nineteenth-Century Protestant Missions and Tsimshian Christianity. Montreal: McGill-Queen’s University Press.
- Pierce, William Henry (1933) From Potlatch to Pulpit, Being the Autobiography of the Rev. William Henry Pierce. Ed. by J. P. Hicks. Vancouver, B.C.: Vancouver Bindery.
- Tate, John (1997) "The Bella Bella Origin of Legaix." Recorded by William Beynon, 1952. In Tsimshian Narratives 2: Trade and Warfare, ed. by George F. MacDonald and John J. Cove, pp. 62-65. Ottawa: Directorate, Canadian Museum of Civilization.
- Wellington Clah, Arthur (1997) "How Tamks Saved William Duncan's Life." Recorded by William Beynon, 1950. In Tsimshian Narratives 2: Trade and Warfare, ed. by George F. MacDonald and John J. Cove, pp. 210-212. Ottawa: Directorate, Canadian Museum of Civilization.
