= Charles Menzies (anthropologist) =

Canadian anthropologist

- Born: Prince Rupert
- Occupations: anthropologist; professor

Charles R. Menzies is a Canadian anthropologist and full professor. He is a member of the Gitxaala Nation of northwestern British Columbia and an enrolled member of the Tlingit and Haida Indian Tribes of Alaska.

== Early life and education ==
Menzies was born in Prince Rupert, British Columbia, Canada, as the eldest of three children of Shirley Marie Menzies (née Naud), an elementary school teacher, and Harry Basil Menzies, a commercial fisherman.

Menzies grew up working on his family's commercial fishing boat. As a commercial fisherman Menzies worked in the halibut longline, salmon seining, and herring seining fisheries.

Menzies graduated from Prince Rupert Secondary School in 1980. He studied anthropology and sociology at Simon Fraser University. He has a MA from York University and a PhD from the City University of New York.

== Career ==
Menzies is a full professor in the Department of Anthropology and the Institute of Oceans and Fisheries at the University of British Columbia. His research focuses on the North Coast of BC and Brittany, France. His British Columbia Coast research includes archaeological, ethnographic, and political economic projects.

== Bibliography ==
- Menzies, Charles R. (2016) People of the Saltwater: An Ethnography of Git lax m'oon. Lincoln: University of Nebraska Press.
- Menzies, Charles R. (2011) Red Flags and Lace Coiffes: Identity and Survival in a Breton Village. Toronto: University of Toronto Press.
- Menzies, Charles R. (ed.) (2006) Traditional Ecological Knowledge and Natural Resource Management. Lincoln: University of Nebraska Press.
