= Lax Kwʼalaams =

- District municipality
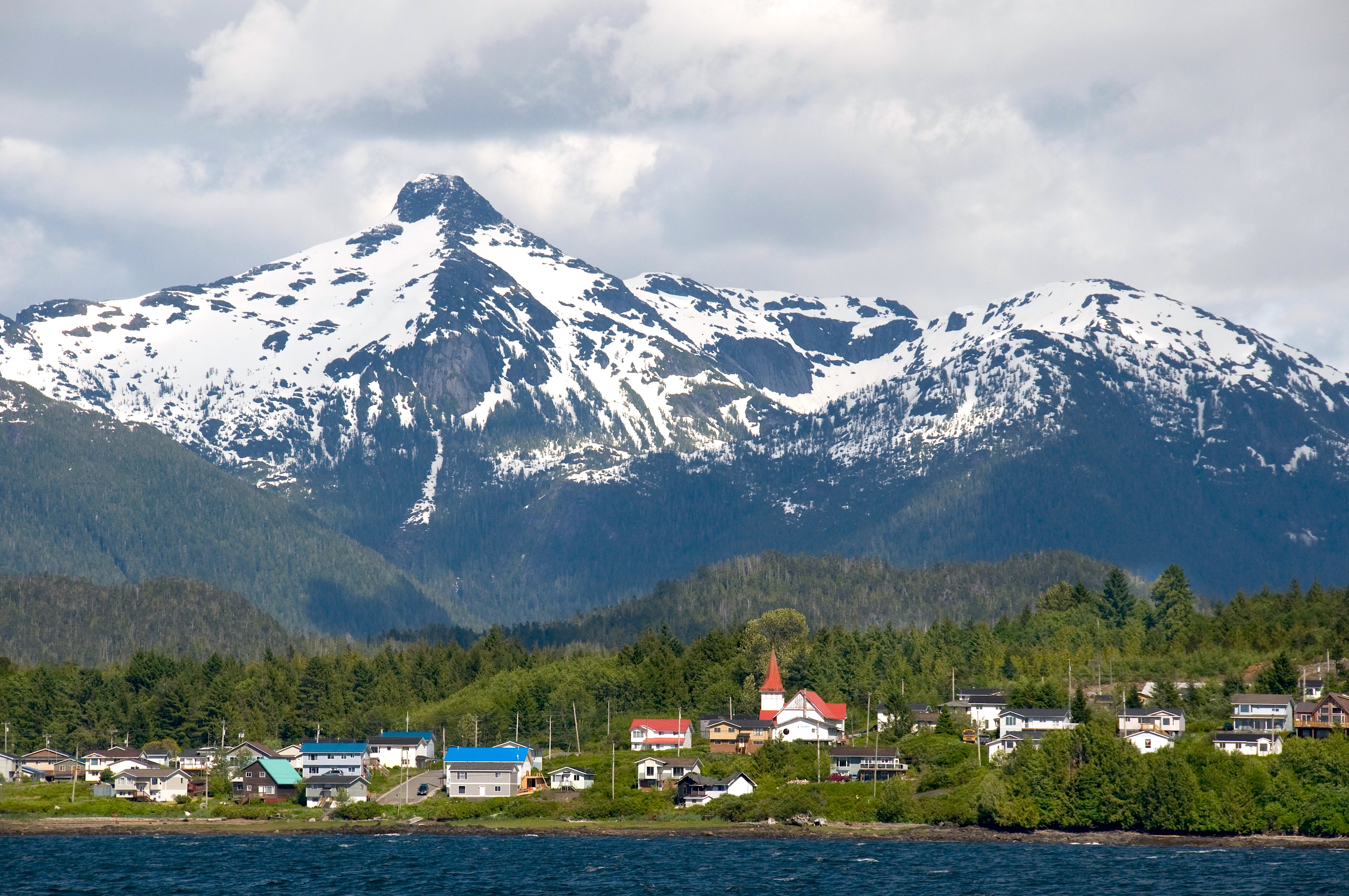
- Lax Kwʼalaams backdropped by Mount McNeil of the Kitimat Ranges

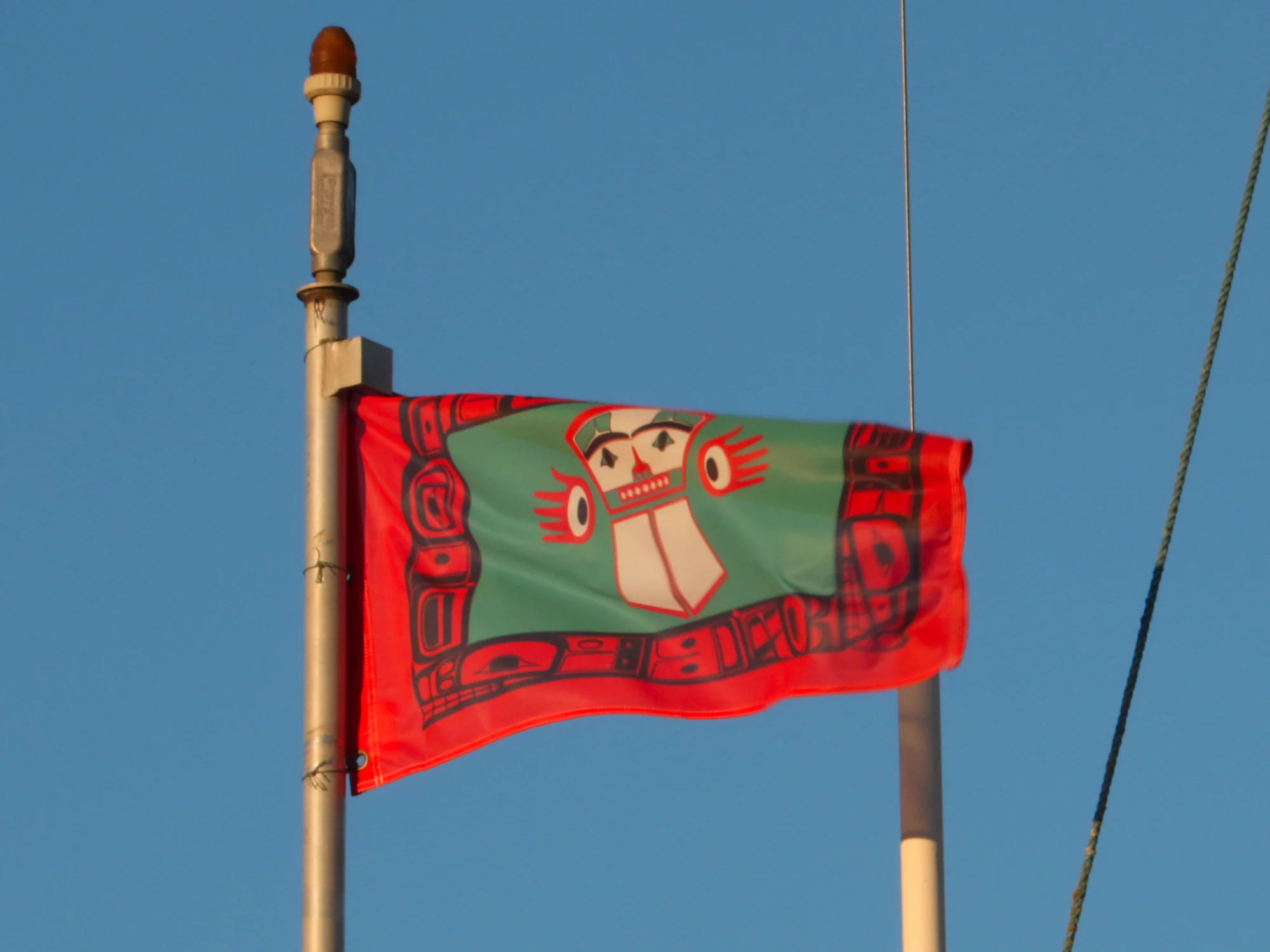
- Flag
- Interactive map of Lax Kwʼalaams
- Location of Lax Kwʼalaams in British Columbia
- Coordinates: 54°33′00″N 130°25′01″W
- Country: Canada
- Province: British Columbia
- Regional district: North Coast
- Established: 1834

Area
  - Total: 109.3 km^{2} (42.2 sq mi)

Population (2016)
  - Total: 1,000
  - Density: 9.1/km^{2} (24/sq mi)
- Postal code: V0V 1H0
- Ferry: Spirit of Lax Kw’alaams
- Website: laxkwalaams.ca

Lax-Kwʼalaams (/ləkwəˈlɑːms/) is an Indigenous village community in British Columbia, Canada, not far from the city of Prince Rupert, on the northwest coast, and accessible only by ferry or water taxi.

Previously called Port Simpson until 1986, it is located on Port Simpson Indian Reserve No. 1, which is shared with other residential communities of the Tsimshian Nation. The Nine Allied Tribes are: Gilutsʼaaw, Ginadoiks, Ginaxangiik, Gispaxloʼots, Gitando, Gitlaan, Gitsʼiis, Gitwilgyoots, and Gitzaxłaał.

== Geology ==
Lax-Kwʼalaams is located east of Chatham Sound, has a rich geological history, and lies within the coastal belt dominated by the Coast Plutonic Complex. These plutons are primarily tonalite, granodiorite, quartz diorite, and diorite.

During the Quaternary, the area was buried beneath an ice thickness exceeding 1 to 2 kilometres (0.62 to 1.24 mi). After deglaciation, relative sea levels were as much as 50 metres (160 ft) higher than now. During this time, the bedrock was coated with glacial till and marine sediments, which now support the rich marine ecosystems important to local traditional livelihoods.

Lax Kw’alaams is experiencing a consistently high rate of erosion along its shoreline, caused by a rise in sea level, storm surges, and strong winds.

== History ==
Lax-Kwʼalaams derives from Laxłguʼalaams, also formerly spelled Lach Goo Alams, which means "place of the wild roses". It was an active camping spot of the Gispaxloʼots tribe. In 1834 the Hudson's Bay Company (HBC) set up a trading post there called Fort Simpson, then Port Simpson. The Gispaxlo'ots Tribe enticed the HBC to set up on their camping site and invited all members of the nine Allied Ts'msyen [Tsimshian] Tribes to live there and build their homes. The fort facility was named after Capt. Aemilius Simpson, superintendent of the HBC's Marine Department and a distant relative of Sir George Simpson, who in 1830 had established the first, short-lived, Fort Simpson, on the nearby Nass River with Peter Skene Ogden. The HBC set up Fort Simpson in order to undermine American dominance of the Maritime Fur Trade along the Pacific Coast. The first HBC factor at the new Fort Simpson was Dr. John Frederick Kennedy. He married the daughter of chief Ligeex of the Gispaxloʼots, as part of the diplomacy which established the fort on Gispaxloʼots territory. Kennedy served at Fort Simpson until 1856.

In 1857 an Anglican lay missionary named William Duncan brought Christianity to Lax Kwʼalaams. In 1862, feeling that the dissipated fort atmosphere was bad for the souls of his Tsimshian followers, he relocated with more than 400 of his flock to Metlakatla, at Metlakatla Pass just to the south. They later moved to Annette Island, Alaska, where he gained authority from the US Congress for an Indian reservation.

Lax Kwʼalaams was without missionaries until 1874, when Rev. Thomas Crosby of the Methodist church arrived. The community is still predominantly Methodist (i.e. United Church of Canada). Crosby's wife, Emma Crosby, founded the Methodist-affiliated Crosby Girls' Home in the community in the 1880s. It became part of B.C.'s Indian residential school system in 1893 and operated until 1948.

In 1931 the Native Brotherhood of British Columbia was founded in Port Simpson as the province's first Native-run rights organization. Its four founders included the Tsimshian ethnologist William Beynon and hereditary Chief William Jeffrey.

Duncan estimated the population of Lax Kwʼalaams in 1857 as 2,300, living in 140 houses. Approximately 500 died shortly after Duncan's departure during the 1862 Pacific Northwest smallpox epidemic. Today Lax Kwʼalaams is the largest of the seven Tsimshian village communities (882 living in the village) in Canada and hosts the Lax Kw'alaams Band main offices which serves over 4100 members. The Lax Kw'alaams Band has the third largest indigenous membership in BC (over 4100). As of 2024 the Lax-kwʼalaams First Nation has over 4,100 members. There are about 10,000 Tsimshian in British Columbia; they are the most numerous indigenous people in the province.

The legal and political interests of the people of Lax Kwʼalaams vis à vis the provincial and federal governments are represented by the Allied Tsimshian Tribes Association, which represents the hereditary chiefs of the Nine Tribes. The Tsimshian have a matrilineal kinship system, with property and descent passed through the maternal lines. Hereditary chiefs come from the maternal lines.

In November 2016, a study published in Nature Communications linked the genome of 25 Indigenous people who inhabited modern-day Prince Rupert, British Columbia 1000 to 6000 years ago with their descendants in the Lax-Kwʼalaams community.

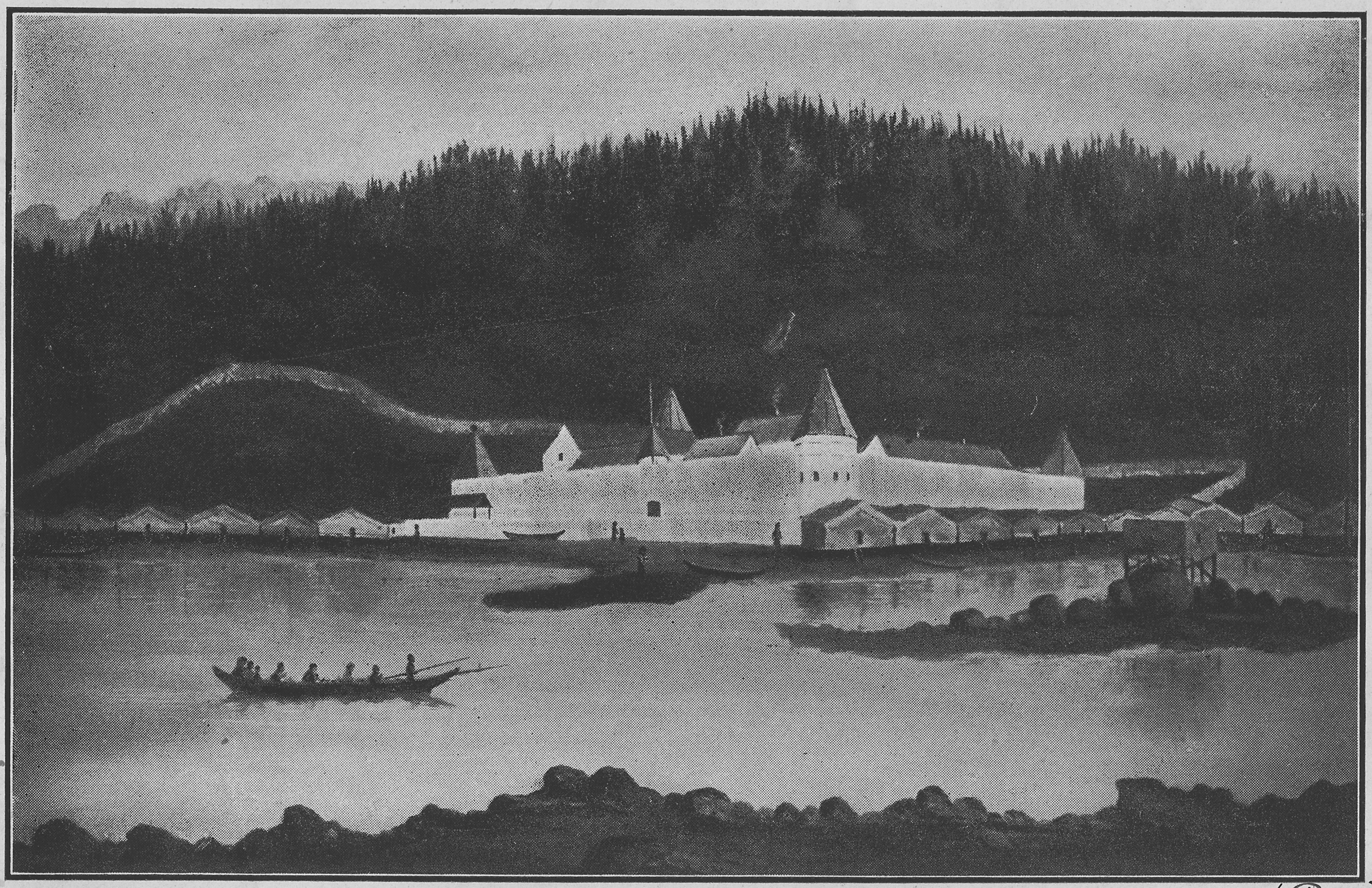
Fort Simpson in 1857

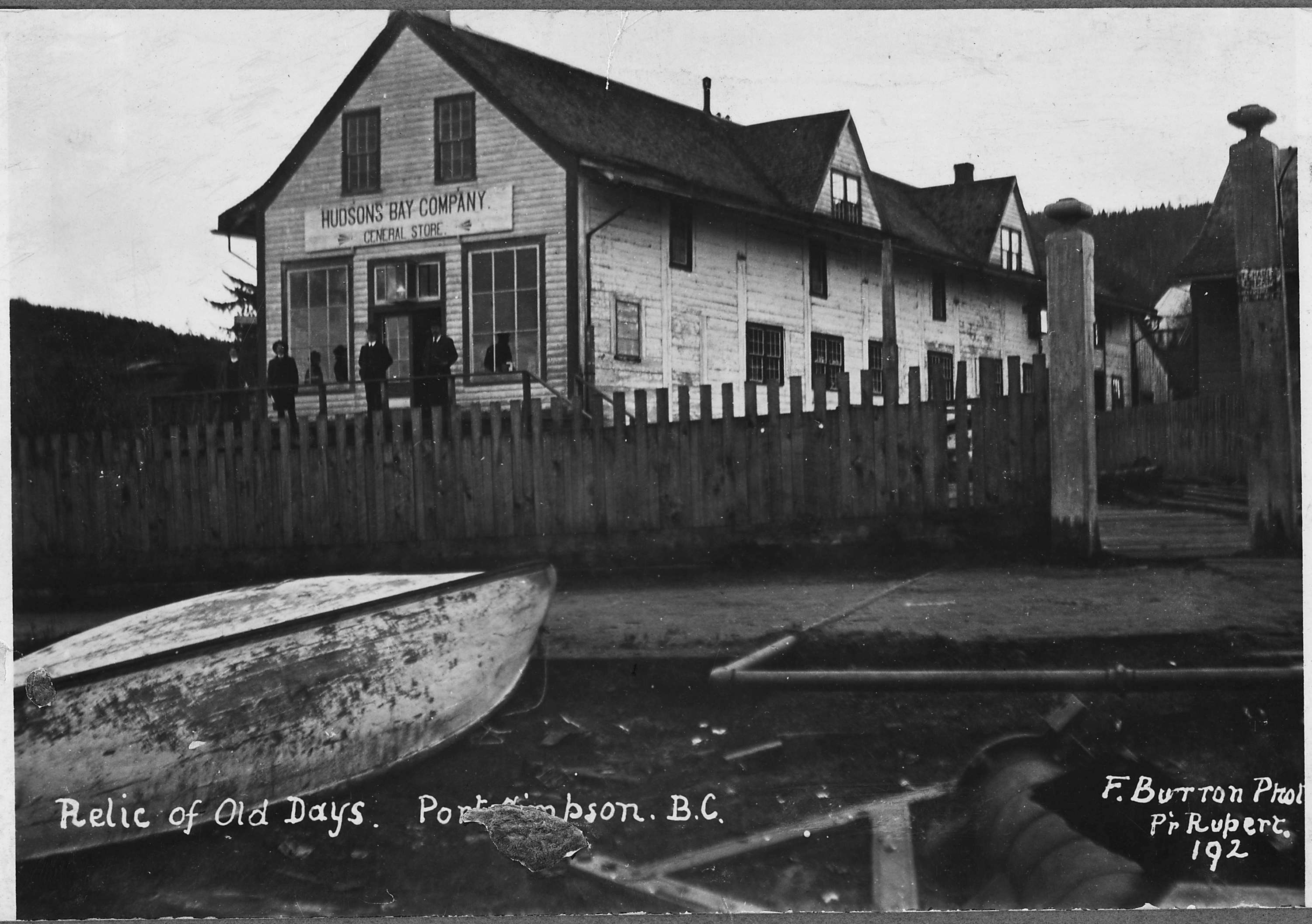
Old Hudson's Bay Co. trading post, early 1900s

== Notable residents ==
- Frederick Alexcee, artist
- William Beynon, hereditary chief and ethnologist
- Alfred Dudoward, hereditary chief
- Bill Helin, artist
- Chief William Jeffrey, hereditary chief, carver and activist
- Odille Morison, linguist and artifact collector
- William Henry Pierce, missionary and memoirist
- Terry Starr, artist
- Henry W. Tate, oral historian
- Shannon Thunderbird, singer-songwriter, speaker, educator, recording artist, playwright, and author
- Arthur Wellington Clah, hereditary chief and diarist

== Bibliography ==
- Bolt, Clarence (1992) Thomas Crosby and the Tsimshian: Small Shoes for Feet Too Large. Vancouver: UBC Press.
- Garfield, Viola E. (1939). "Tsimshian Clan and Society". University of Washington Publications in Anthropology. 7 (3). Seattle: University of Washington: 167–340.
- Hare, Jan, and Jean Barman (2006) Good Intentions Gone Awry: Emma Crosby and the Methodist Mission on the Northwest Coast. Afterword by Caroline Dudoward. Vancouver: UBC Press.
- Inglis, Gordon B., et al. (1990) "Tsimshians of British Columbia since 1900." In Handbook of North American Indians, Volume 7: Northwest Coast, pp. 285–293. Washington: Smithsonian Institution.
- Large, R. Geddes (1957; reprinted, 1981) The Skeena: River of Destiny. Sidney, B.C.: Gray's Publishing.
- Meilleur, Helen (2001) A Pour of Rain: Stories from a West Coast Fort. Vancouver: Raincoast Books.
- Neylan, Susan (2001) The Heavens Are Changing: Nineteenth-Century Protestant Missions and Tsimshian Christianity. Montreal: McGill-Queen's University Press.
- Calvin Helin - Tsimshian Lax Kw'alaams (2008) "Dancing with dependency," (2010) "Out of poverty through self-reliance"
