= Laxsgiik =

The Laxsgiik (variously spelled) is the name for the Eagle "clan" (phratry) in the language of the Tsimshian nation of British Columbia, Canada, and southeast Alaska. It is considered analogous or identical to identically named groups among the neighboring Gitksan and Nisga'a nations and also to lineages in the Haida nation.

The name Laxsgiik derives from xsgiik, the word for eagle in the Tsimshian, Gitksan, and Nisga'a languages.

The chief crest of the Laxsgiik is the Eagle. Beaver and Halibut are also common Laxsgiik crests.

Tsimshian, Gitksan, and Nisga'a matrilineal houses belonging to the Laxsgiik tend to belong to one of two groups, the Gwinhuut and the Gitxon.

== Gwinhuut ==
The Gwinhuut (meaning literally "refugees") are according to tradition descended from migrations from the Eagle-clan peoples of the Tlingit nation in what is now Alaska. Gwinhuut houses are more numerous than Gitxon ones, and they are related to various Tlingit Eagle groups. All Gitksan Laxsgiik are Gwinhuut, as are most Tsimshian and Nisga'a Laxsgiik houses.

Gwinhuut houses include:

- House of Ligeex, Gispaxlo'ots tribe, Lax Kw'alaams (Port Simpson)
- House of Lutguts'amti, Gitkxaała tribe, Kitkatla

== Gitxon ==
The Gitxon (also spelled Gitxhoon) group mostly claim descent from ancient migrations from the Haida Gwaii, homeland of the Haida nation. Gitxon is popularly etymologized as git (people of) + x (to eat) + hoon (salmon), yielding the meaning "salmon eaters." The anthropologist Marius Barbeau, whose writings are the best introduction to Laxsgiik histories, calls this group's ancestral histories "the Salmon-Eater tradition." Members of the Gitxon group can be found among the Nisga'a, among the Tsimshian tribes of Kitselas and Gitga'ata, among the Haisla nation at Kitamaat, and at Skidegate on the Queen Charlottes. Gitxon houses frequently are headed by chiefs named Gitxon. At Hartley Bay, where the Gitga'ata live, the group is known as the House of Sinaxeet.

Barbeau's now discredited theories about the peopling of the Americas—he claimed a far more recent Siberian ancestry for the Tlingit, Haida, and Tsimshianic-speakers (Tsimshian, Gitksan, and Nisga'a) than is now known to be possible for any Amerindian group—included an assertion that the Gitxon people migrated from Siberia, via the Aleutian Islands and Kodiak Island in Alaska, "only a few centuries ago" (as he phrased it in the Preface to his Totem Poles). (Barbeau also, controversially and by today's standards erroneously, attributed their adoption of the Eagle crest to the influence of Russian traders' heraldic emblems during the fur trade.)

In 1927 in Kincolith, B.C., Barbeau recorded from the Nisga'a "Chief Mountain" (Sga'niism Sim'oogit, a.k.a. Saga'wan), a story (adaawak in Nisga'a) of the origin of the Gitxon people which records their arrival on Haida Gwaii, homeland of the Haida, where the Gitxon Eagles came to form one moiety of a village while the people of Qoona formed another. This story tells of Gitxon's niece Dzilakons (variously spelled) and her engagement with a prince of the opposite moiety which led to a war between the two sides, spurring the Gitxon people's migration to the Nisga'a homeland on the Nass River, to the Tsimshian villages of Kitkatla and Kitsumkalum, and to the Cape Fox (in Nisga'a Laxsee'le) tribe of Tlingits in what is now Alaska.

Other versions of Gitxon migrations tell of movements from the Charlottes to the Nass, from the Nass to the Charlottes and back again, from Kitsumkalum to the Charlottes and back again, or from Kitselas to Kitamaat to the Charlottes and back again. The Charlottes and Alaska both arise as possible originary points for this group.

In 1947, Edmund Patalas ("belonging to the Kitamat tribe at Hartley Bay") described to the Tsimshian ethnologist William Beynon the origins of the people of the "Gitxon" group who migrated from the land of the Queen Charlottes first to Kitamaat and then to the Gitga'ata people, where a branch of this group, the House of Sinaxeet, is now considered "the royal Eagle house of Kitkata." In 1952, Barbeau recorded a Nass elder's statement that the Gitxons at the Tsimshian village of Hartley Bay were the most numerous, while the Gitxon populations at the Tsimshian villages of Kitsumkalum and Lax Kw'alaams were nearly extinct.

The Gitxon people at Kitsumkalum, who are referred to in stories, were not part of the Kitsumkalum tribe by the time Barbeau interviewed Kitsumkalum elders on the subject in the 1920s. The anthropologist James McDonald speculates that the Kitsumkalum Gitxons may have become extinct during the fur trade and that the Kitselas Gitxons borrowed members from the Gispaxlo'ots Laxsgiik to perpetuate their lineage during the 20th century. The Kitselas House of Gitxon and Niisgitloop today is a Kitselas house closely associated with the Kitsumkalum community.

In 1924, the Gitxon of the Kitselas tribe was Samuel Wise. Barbeau interviewed him at Port Essington, B.C., in 1924. His version of the migration tells of a journey of Gitxon people from the Charlottes, to Kitamaat, and then up to Kitselas.

== Nisg̱a'a - Lax̱sgiik ==
Some Nisga'a House Groups Among the Laxsgiik Tribe include:

- Lax̱-Ts'imilx Clan
  - House of Hleeḵ - Joseph Gosnell Sr.
  - House of Bayt 'Neeḵhl - Moses McKay
  - House of Luuya'as - Alver Tait
- Lax̱-luuks Clan -Gitg̱awilee
  - House of Gwiix Maa'w - John Robinson
- Lax̱-luuks - Sim-Lax̱sgiik Clan
  - House of Minee'eskw - Victor Robinson
    - W̓ii Gilax̱namḵ’ap - Rev. Clyde Gary Davis
    - Saxgum Hii G̱ooḵ - Gary Patsy
- Lax̱-luuks - Gisk'abinaak Clan
  - House of Laa'y - Hubert Haldane
- Lax̱-luuks - Gwinhuut clan
  - House of Gitx̱hoon - Russell Morven (previously Ernie Morven)
  - House of Tx̱aalax̱hatkw - Charles Stewart (wing chief in Gitx̱hoon) (not to be confused with Txaatk'anlaxhatkw, a Ganada house)
  - House of Sg̱a'nisim Sim'oogit - James Robinson
  - House of Gwakaans - Claude N. Barton(wing chief in Gitx̱hoon)

== Bibliography ==
- Barbeau, Marius (1929) Totem Poles of the Gitksan, Upper Skeena River, British Columbia. (Anthropological Series 12, National Museum of Canada Bulletin 61.) Ottawa: Canada, Department of Mines.
- Barbeau, Marius (1950) Totem Poles. (2 vols.) (Anthropology Series 30, National Museum of Canada Bulletin 119.) Ottawa: National Museum of Canada. Reprinted, Canadian Museum of Civilization, Hull, Quebec, 1990.
- Barbeau, Marius (1961) Tsimsyan Myths. (Anthropological Series 51, National Museum of Canada Bulletin 174.) Ottawa: Department of Northern Affairs and National Resources.
- Marsden, Susan (2001) "Defending the Mouth of the Skeena: Perspectives on Tsimshian Tlingit Relations." In: Perspectives in Northern Northwest Coast Prehistory, ed. by Jerome S. Cybulski, pp. 61–106. (Mercury Series, Archaeological Survey of Canada, Paper 160.) Hull, Quebec: Canadian Museum of Civilization
- McDonald, James A. (2003) People of the Robin: The Tsimshian of Kitsumkalum. CCI Press.
- Morvin, John (1997) "The Origin of the Gitxawn Group at Kitsemkalem." Recorded by William Beynon, 1953. In Tsimshian Narratives 2: Trade and Warfare, ed. by George F. MacDonald and John J. Cove, pp. 1–4. Ottawa: Directorate, Canadian Museum of Civilization.
- Shotridge, Louis (1919) "A Visit to the Tsimshian Indians (continued)." Museum Journal, vol. 10, no. 3, pp. 117–148. Philadelphia: University Museum, University of Pennsylvania
- Council of Elders, Ayuuḵhl Nisg̱a'a Department & Nisg̱a'a Lisims Government (2008) Anhluut'ukwsim Saẁinskhl Nisg̱a'a: Nisg̱a'a Feast Procedures & Protocols Gitlax̱t'aamiks, British Columbia
