= Tsimshian =

Indigenous people of the northwest coast of North America

Tsʼmsyen
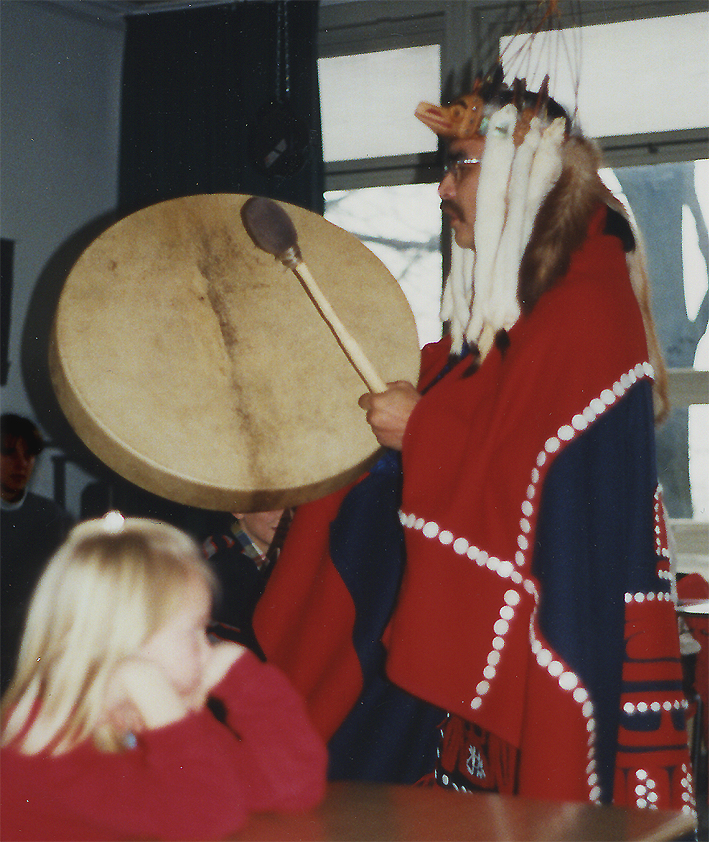
- Tsimshian drumming in 1999

Total population
- 8,162

Regions with significant populations
- Canada British Columbia: 5,910
- United States Alaska: 2,252

Languages
- English • Coast Tsimshian

Religion
- Christianity (Episcopalianism, Presbyterianism, Methodism) • Animism

- People: Tsʼmsyen
- Language: Sm'álgyax; Sgüüx̣s
- Country: La̱xyuubm Tsʼmsyen

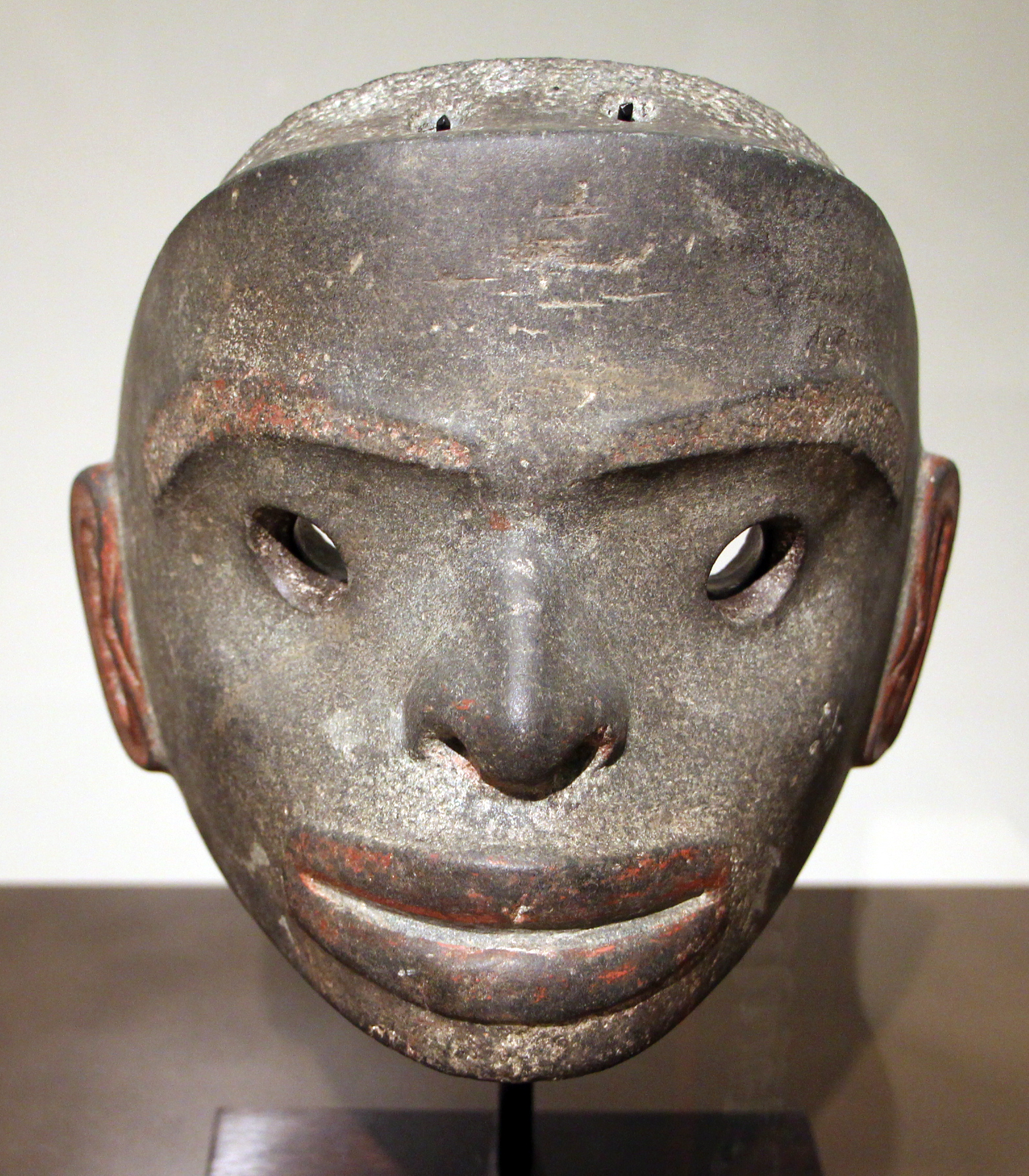
Tsimshian Nisga'a stone mask, made around 1870 - greenish hard stone (gabbro), pigment; from the Alphonse Pinart collection, Musée du quai Branly in Paris. This stone mask has a twin, without apertures for eyes, residing in the Canadian Museum of History. Separated over one hundred years, the two masks were reunited 1975, when the Paris mask travelled to Canada to appear in the exhibition "Images Stone: B.C." It was then that the relationship between the two masks, expressions of the same face, was re-discovered.

The Tsimshian (Note: There are many other ways to spell the name, such as: Tsimpshean, Tsimshean, Tsimpshian, and others; this article will use the most common spelling, "Tsimshian".) (/ˈsɪmʃiən/; Tsimshian: Tsʼmsyen, lit. 'Inside the Skeena River') are an Indigenous people of the Pacific Northwest Coast of North America. Their communities are mostly in coastal British Columbia in Terrace and Prince Rupert, and Metlakatla, Alaska on Annette Island, the only reservation in Alaska.

The Tsimshian estimate there are 45,000 Tsimshian people and approximately 10,000 members are federally registered in eight First Nations communities: Kitselas, Kitsumkalum, Gitxaala, Gitga'at, Kitasoo, Lax Kw'Alaams, and Metlakatla. The latter two communities resulted in the colonial intersections of early settlers and consist of Tsimshian people belonging to the 'nine tribes.' The Tsimshian are one of the largest First Nations peoples in northwest British Columbia. Some Tsimshian migrated to the Annette Islands in Alaska, and today approximately 1,450 Alaska Tsimshian people are enrolled in the federally recognized Metlakatla Indian Community, sometimes also called the Annette Island Reserve. The Tsimshian honor the traditional Tlingit name of Taquan for this recent location.

Tsimshian society is matrilineal kinship-based, which means identity, clans and property pass through the maternal line. Their moiety-based societal structure is further divided into sub clans for certain lineages. The Tsimshian language has some 27 different terms for 'chief' likely because it is a stratified and ranked society.

Early Euro-Canadian anthropologists and linguists had classified the Gitxsan and Nisgaʼa as Tsimshian, because of apparent linguistic affinities. The three were all referred to as "Coast Tsimshian", even though some communities were not coastal. These three groups, however, are separate nations.

== History ==
Tsimshian translates to "Inside the Skeena River" At one time the Tsimshian lived on the upper reaches of the Skeena River near present-day Hazelton, British Columbia.

According to southern Tsimshian oral history, after a series of disasters befell the people, a chief led a migration away from the cursed land to the coast, where they founded Kitkatla Village, the first of three Southern Tsimshian villages. Kitkatla is still considered to be the most conservative of the Tsimshian villages. The Nisga'a and Gitxsan remained in the upper Skeena region (above the canyon) near the Nass River and forks of the Skeena respectively, but other Tsimshian chiefs moved down the river and occupied all the lands of the lower Skeena valley. Over time, these groups developed a new dialect of their ancestral language and came to regard themselves as a distinct population, the Tsimshian-proper. They continued to share the rights and customs of those who are known as the Gitxsan, their kin on the upper Skeena.

The Tsimshian maintained winter villages in and around the islands of Prince Rupert Harbour and Venn Pass (Metlakatla). They returned to their summer villages along the lower Skeena River when the salmon returned. Archaeological evidence shows 5,000 years of continuous habitation in the Prince Rupert region.

Gitxaala might have been the first Tsimshian village contacted by Europeans when Captain Charles Duncan and James Colnett arrived in 1787 although Russian fur traders may have visited northern groups earlier. The confluence of the Skeena and Bulkley Rivers was formerly the site of the Tsimshian village of Kitanmaks and became a new European settlement of Skeena Forks (today known as Hazelton). When the Hudson's Bay Company moved their fort to modern-day Lax Kwʼalaams in 1834, nine Tsimshian tribal chiefs moved to the surrounding area for trade advantage. Many of the Tsimshian peoples in Canada still live in these regions.

Throughout the second half of the 19th century, epidemics of infectious disease contracted from Europeans ravaged their communities, as the First Nations had no acquired immunity to these diseases. The 1862 Pacific Northwest smallpox epidemic killed many of the Tsimshian people. Altogether, at least one in four Tsimshian died in a series of, at minimum, three large-scale outbreaks.

In 1835, the total population of the Tsimshian peoples was estimated at 8,500. By 1885, the population had dropped to 4,500, 817 of whom moved to Alaska two years later following missionary William Duncan.

In the 1880s the Anglican missionary William Duncan, along with a group of the Tsimshian, left Metlakatla, British Columbia and requested settlement on Annette Island from the U.S. government. After gaining approval, the group founded New Metlakatla on Annette Island in southern Alaska. Duncan appealed to Congress to grant the community reservation status, which it did in the late 19th century.

In 1895, the BC Tsimshian population stood at 3,550, while the Alaska Tsimshian population had dropped to 465 by 1900. Some of the Tsimshian had returned south to their homelands on the Skeena. After this low-water point, the Tsimshian population began to grow again, eventually to reach modern numbers comparable to the 1835 population estimate. However, the numbers of the inland Tsimshian peoples are now higher than they were historically, while those of the Southern and Coastal Tsimshian are much lower.

In the 1970s, the Metlakatla Indian Community voted to retain their rights to land and water, and opted out of the Alaska Native Claims Settlement Act (ANCSA); they have the only Native reservation in Alaska. The Metlakatla Tsimshian maintained their reservation status and holdings exclusive of the ANSCA. They do not have an associated Native Corporation, although Tsimshian in Alaska may be shareholders of the Sealaska Corporation. The Annette Islands Reserve was the only location in Alaska allowed to maintain fish traps according to traditional rights. The use of these were otherwise banned when Alaska became a state in 1959. The traps were used to gather fish for food for people living on the reservation. Legally the community was required to use the traps at least once every three years or lose the right permanently. They stopped the practice early in the 2000s and lost their right to this traditional way of fishing.

The majority of Tsimshian still live in the lower Skeena River watershed near Prince Rupert, as well as northern coastal BC. Some Tsimshian moved south into the Columbia River Basin mid-nineteenth century for picking hops and other agricultural crops. Many Tsimshian have moved into Seattle region from both AK and BC. Long distance canoe travel for a variety of activities was not uncommon prior to contact, and for some duration after contact into the 1920s. A battle ensued at Dungeness Spit near Port Townsend, Washington where some Tsimshian were camped along the shore. One woman survived and was rescued by a lighthouse operator who later married her.

== Culture ==
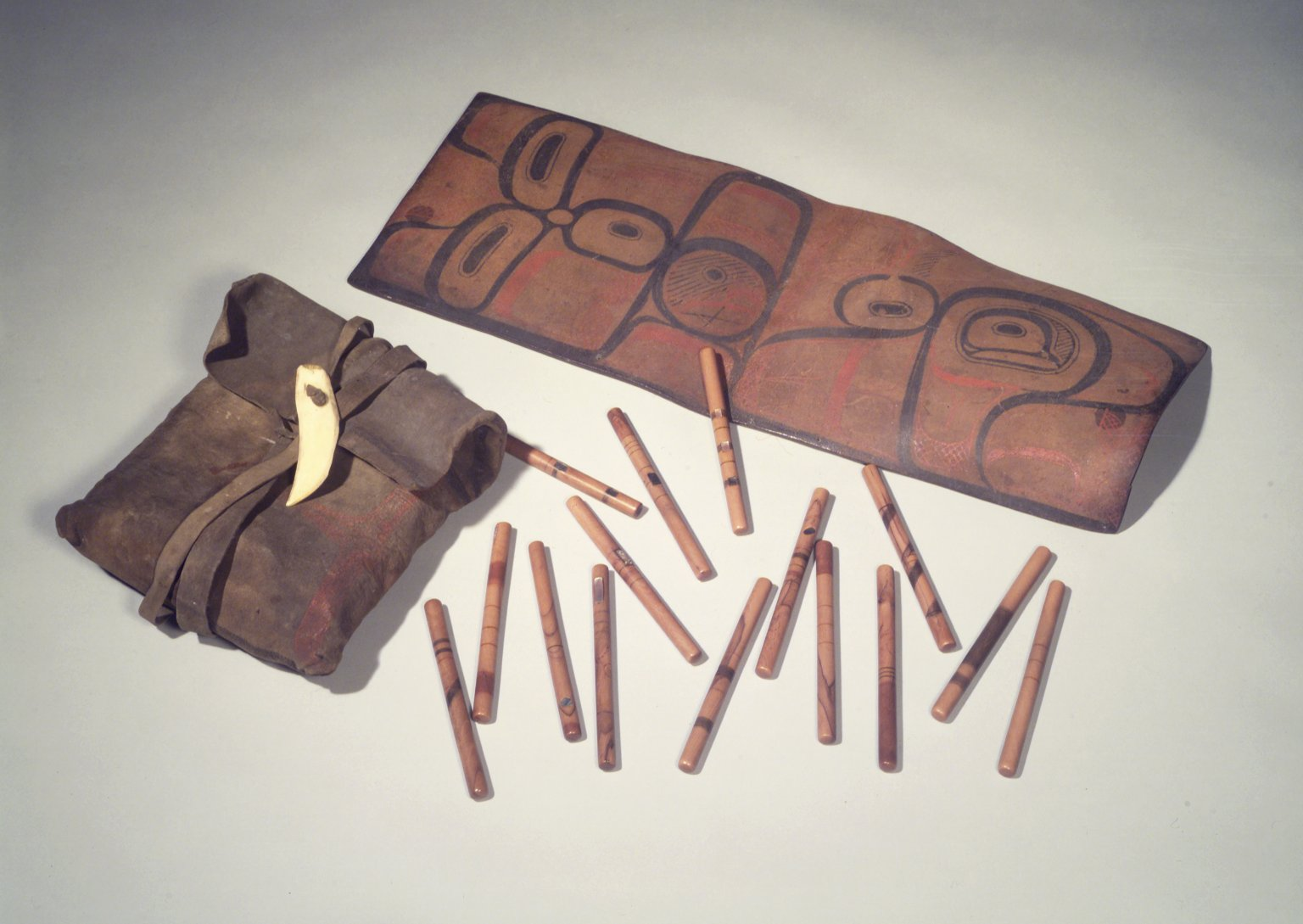
Bag with 65 Inlaid Gambling Sticks, Tsimshian (Native American), 19th century, Brooklyn Museum

The Tsimshian have a matrilineal kinship system, with a societal structure based on a tribe, house group and clan system. Descent and property are transmitted through the maternal line. Hereditary chiefs obtain their rights through their maternal line through their mother's brother. Although it is inherited the protege must be trained for proper behavior and groomed well for specific obligations. No lineage should be sullied by inappropriate behaviors of high-ranking members.

The marriage ceremony was an extremely formal affair, several prolonged and sequential ceremonies. Arranged marriages and births were common to protect rights of access to territories and resources. Some cultural taboos have related to prohibiting women and men from eating improper foods during and after childbirth. Several taboos still exist and are actively practiced.

Like all Northwest Coastal peoples, the Tsimshian harvested the abundant sea life, especially salmon. The Tsimshian became seafaring people, like the Haida. Salmon continues to be at the center of their nutrition, despite large-scale commercial fishing in the area. Due to this abundant food source, the Tsimshian developed permanent towns. They lived in large longhouses, made from cedar house posts and panels to withstand the wet climate. These were very large and usually housed an entire extended family.

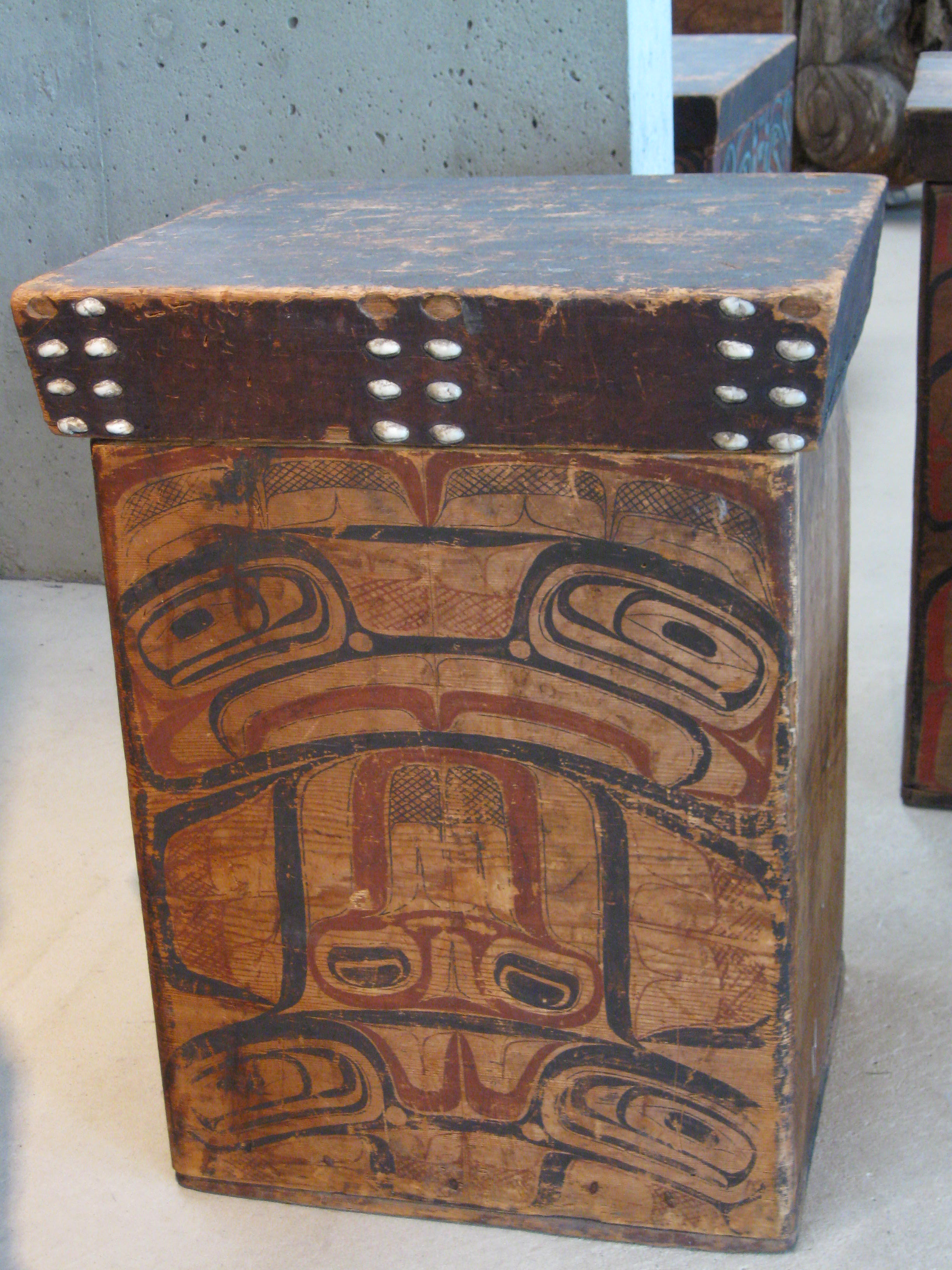
Tsimshian bentwood box featuring formline painting, 1850, collection of the UBC Anthropology Museum

Tsimshian religion centered on the "Lord of Heaven", who aided people in times of need by sending supernatural servants to earth to aid them. The Tsimshian believed that charity and purification of the body (either by cleanliness or fasting) was the route to the afterlife.

The Tsimshian engage in the feast system or potlatch, which they refer to as the yaawk (feast) for one specific event. Today in Tsimshian culture, the potlatch is held to honour deaths, burials, and succession to name-titles. The Tsimshian have four different types of feasts. The feast system is the agency for social reproduction, expression of law, the transmission of knowledge, and demonstration of the obligations for chiefs to provide stewardship for resources and attending to needs of communities. The planning and delivery of feast events requires very specific protocols, including those required for the guests. It is untoward to hold out one's hand while payments (also known as 'gifts' by external observers) are being distributed.

The Tsimshian have maintained their fishing and hunting lifestyle (although constrained by colonialism and declining fish and animal population abundances), art and culture, and are working to revitalize the common use of their language. Artists have excelled in traditional mediums and contemporary forms with pieces spread around the world. These artisans practice the tradition of story telling with their chosen mediums.

=== Ethnobotany ===
Like other coastal peoples, the Tsimshian fashioned most of their goods out of western red cedar, especially its bark. It could be fashioned into tools, clothing, roofing, armour, building materials, and canoe skins. They used cedar in their Chilkat weaving, which they are credited with inventing. They use the berries of Vaccinium Vitis-idaea ssp. minus as food.

== Tribes ==
The Tsimshian people of British Columbia encompass fifteen tribes:

- Kitasoo – (Tsimshian: Gitasts'uu, lit. '(People of) a large, tiered house-depression') together with the Xai'xais, a Heiltsuk group from Kynoch Inlet, they are part of the Kitasoo/Xaixais First Nation at Klemtu (Klemdulxk / Xłmduulxk), British Columbia.
- Gitga'at – (Tsimshian: Gitḵ'a'ata, lit. 'People of the Cane'), as Gitga'at First Nation at Hartley Bay (Txałgiu / Txałgiiw), British Columbia.
- Gitxaala – (Tsimshian: Gitxaała, lit. 'people of the open sea' or Tsimshian: Git Lax M’oon, lit. 'people of the salt water'), as Gitxaala Nation they live in the village of Kitkatla (La̱x Klan), British Columbia.
- Kitsumkalum – (Tsimshian: Gitsumkalum, lit. 'people of the plateau') as Kitsumkalum First Nation, in Terrace, British Columbia.
- Kitselas – (Tsimshian: Gitselasu, lit. 'people of the Canyon') as Kitselas First Nation near Terrace, British Columbia.

Some of the Chiefs of these nine tribes happened to be located at Fort Simpson (later Lax Kw'alaams, British Columbia) when the Indian Agent assigned reserve communities

- Giluts'aaw
- Ginadoiks
- Ginaxangiik
- Gispaxlo'ots
- Gitando
- Gitlaan
- Gits'iis
- Gitwilgyoots
- Gitzaxłaał

Other Chiefs were located at the mission created community of Metlakatla, with some subsequently migrating to Metlakatla, Alaska, newest tribe, with lineages from all Tsimshian tribes.

== Clans ==
The Tsimshian clans are the

- Gispwudwada (Killer Whale or Fireweed Clan)
- Ganhada (Raven or Frog Clan)
- Laxgibuu (Wolf Clan)
- Laxsgiik (Eagle Clan)

=== Treaty process ===
The Tsimshian wanted to preserve their villages and fishing sites on the Skeena River and Nass River as early as 1879. They were not able to begin negotiating a treaty with the Canadian government until July 1983. A decade later, fourteen tribes united to negotiate under the collective name of the Tsimshian Tribal Council. A framework agreement was signed in 1997. Due to litigation by one community for commercial fisheries rights, the federal government forced a confidentiality clause against other communities and caused dissolution of the main treaty group and subsequently the TTC. A subset of the Tsimshian First Nations continues to negotiate with the BC Treaty Commission to reach an Agreement-in-Principle that has alienated most members.

== Language ==
The Tsimshian speak a language, called Sm'algyax, which translates as "real or true tongue". The Tsimshian also speak a language variety similar to Gitxsan and Nisga’a (two inland Tsimshianic languages), but differentiated from the regional Tsimshian variations. In 2016, only 160 people in Canada were Tsimshian speakers.

Some linguists classify Tsimshian languages as a member of the theoretical Penutian language group.

== Notable Tsimshian people ==
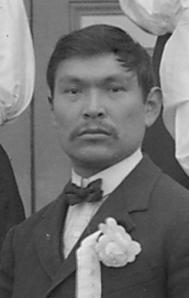
Benjamin Haldane, 1907, Tsimshian photographer and musician

- Frederick Alexcee, artist, culture bearer
- Morgan Asoyuf, artist, culture bearer
- William Beynon, Gitlaan and ethnographer
- David A. Boxley, Laxsgiik, carver and culture bearer. First to host a potlatch and raise a totem pole in modern times in Metlakatla, Alaska
- Arthur Wellington Clah, from the House of Tamks of the Gispaxlo'ots. Translator at Fort Simpson, the first to teach Father Duncan the Sm`algyax language, diarist
- Marcia Crosby, art historian
- Alfred Dudoward, hereditary chief of the Gitando, and leader of the Port Simpson Methodist Movement. co-founder of the Native Brotherhood
- Phil Gray, artist
- Benjamin Haldane, pioneering photographer from Metlakatla village
- Calvin Helin – lawyer, author, entrepreneur
- William Jeffrey, Gitwilgyoats, hereditary chief, activist, carver
- Rudy Kelly, author and journalist
- Paul Legaic, hereditary chief of the Gispaxlo'ots and trader.
- Charles Menzies, Gitxaała, House of Ts'ibasaa, author and anthropologist.
- Odille Morison, translator and art collector
- William Henry Pierce, missionary and memoirist
- Bilham 'neex Loa Ryan, Gitlan, House of Xpe Hanaax, Ganhada, artist and traditional cedar weaver
- Peter Simpson, Native American rights activist
- Henry W. Tate, Gispakloats, oral historian, tribal headman
- Roy Henry Vickers, artist
- Walter Wright; hereditary chief of the Gits'ilaasü (Kitselas) and oral historian

== Anthropologists and other scholars who have worked with the Tsimshian ==
- Marius Barbeau
- William Beynon
- Franz Boas
- Philip Drucker
- Wilson Duff
- Viola Garfield
- René Girard
- Marjorie Halpin
- Jay Miller

== Missionaries who proselytized the Tsimshian ==
- William Henry Collison
- Thomas Crosby, Methodist
- William Duncan Anglican/independent
- Edward Marsden, Presbyterian
- Bishop William Ridley Anglican
- Robert Tomlinson, Anglican

== See also ==
- Tsimshian mythology
- Gitksan language
- Nisga'a language
- Coast Tsimshian

== Bibliography ==
- Barbeau, Marius (1950) Totem Poles. 2 vols. (Anthropology Series 30, National Museum of Canada Bulletin 119.) Ottawa: National Museum of Canada.
- Boas, Franz, "Tsimshian Mythology", in Thirty-First Annual Report of the Bureau of American Ethnology to the Secretary of the Smithsonian Institution, 1909–1910, pp. 29–1037. Washington: Government Printing Office, 1916.
- Garfield, Viola, "Tsimshian Clan and Society", University of Washington Publications in Anthropology, vol. 7, no. 3 (1939), pp. 167–340.
- Garfield, Viola E., and Paul S. Wingert, The Tsimshian Indians and Their Arts, Seattle: Washington, University of Washington Press, 1951, 1966.
- Halpin, Marjorie M., and Margaret Seguin, "Tsimshian Peoples: Southern Tsimshian, Coast Tsimshian, Nishga, and Gitksan", In: Handbook of North American Indians, Volume 7: Northwest Coast, edited by Wayne Suttles. Washington, DC: Smithsonian Institution, 1990, pp. 267–284.
- McDonald, James A. (2003) People of the Robin: The Tsimshian of Kitsumkalum, CCI Press.
- Miller, Jay, Tsimshian Culture: A Light through the Ages, Lincoln, NE: University of Nebraska Press, 1997.
- Miller, Jay, and Carol Eastman, eds., The Tsimshian and Their Neighbors of the North Pacific Coast, Seattle, WA: University of Washington Press, 1984.
- Neylan, Susan, The Heavens Are Changing: Nineteenth-Century Protestant Missions and Tsimshian Christianity, Montreal: McGill-Queen's University Press, 2003.
- Roth, Christopher. 2008. Becoming Tsimshian: The Social Life of Names. Seattle: University of Washington Press.
- Seguin, Margaret, Interpretive Contexts for Traditional and Current Coast Tsimshian Feasts. Ottawa, ON: National Museums of Canada, 1985.
- Seguin, Margaret, ed., The Tsimshian: Images of the Past, Views for the Present. Vancouver, BC: UBC Press, 1984.
