= Gispaxlo'ots =

The Gispaxlo'ots are one of the 14 tribes of the Tsimshian nation in British Columbia, Canada, and one of the nine of those tribes making up the "Nine Tribes" of the lower Skeena River resident at Lax Kw'alaams (a.k.a. Port Simpson), B.C. The name Gispaxlo'ots means literally "people of the place of elderberries." Their traditional territory includes an area on the Skeena River between present-day Terrace and Prince Rupert. Since 1834, when a Hudson's Bay Company trading fort was established at Lax Kw'alaams, they have been based there. Their chief Ligeex permitted the HBC to build on Gispaxlo'ots territory.

Traditionally, the Gispaxlo'ots have been the most powerful of the Tsimshian tribes, due to the exploits and wealth of Ligeex, a great trading chief. As part of the negotiations with the HBC, he arranged in 1832 for his daughter Sudaał to marry Dr. John Frederick Kennedy, the first HBC partner of the fort. The House of Ligeex belongs to the Laxsgiik (Eagle clan).

Other house-groups (extended matrilineal families) of the Gispaxlo'ots include:

- House of Spooxs -- Laxsgiik (Eagle clan) (this house has members associated today with the Kitsumkalum community)
- House of Suhalaayt -- Gispwudwada (Killerwhale clan) (a totem pole belonging to this house was standing in Lax Kw'alaams as recently as the 1930s)
- House of T'amks -- Gispwudwada (headed by Arthur Wellington Clah until his death, 1916)
- House of 'Wiigyet—Gispwudada (Killerwhale clan)

In 1935 William Beynon recorded that Gispaxlo'ots people in Lax Kw'alaams included 18 members of the Gispwudwada (Killerwhale clan) (2 house-groups), 24 members of the Ganhada (Raven) (1 house-group), and 63 members of the Laxsgiik (Eagle) (6 house-groups).

== Prominent Gispaxlo'ots people ==
- Paul Legaic, Legaic V, hereditary chief and merchant trader
- Rev. William Henry Pierce, missionary and memoirist
- Henry W. Tate, oral historian
- Arthur Wellington Clah, head man and diarist, taught Father Duncan sm'algyax
- Legaic IV, known as Old Legaic, the pinnacle of chiefly dynasty
- Elizabeth Diiks Lawson, sister to Legaic V, mother of Sgagweet IV
- John C. Tate, oral historian,
- Xoop, in time of Legaic IV, acted as regent for the child chief

Current heads of the tribe:

- Russell Mather Sr., Chief Neesa Walp (House of Neesa Walp)
- Alex Campbell Sr., Chief Gitxoon (House of Gitxoon)
- Wayne Ryan

== Sources ==
- Barbeau, Marius (1950) Totem Poles. 2 vols. (Anthropology Series 30, National Museum of Canada Bulletin 119.) Ottawa: National Museum of Canada.
- Garfield, Viola E. (1939) "Tsimshian Clan and Society." University of Washington Publications in Anthropology, vol. 7, no. 3, pp. 167–340.
- McDonald, James A. (2003) People of the Robin: The Tsimshian of Kitsumkalum. CCI Press.
