= Laxgibuu =

The Laxgibuu or Laxgyibuu (variously spelled) is the name for the Wolf "clan" (phratry) in the language of the Tsimshian nation of British Columbia, Canada, and southeast Alaska. It is considered analogous or identical to identically named clans among the neighboring Gitksan and Nisga'a nations.

The name Laxgibuu derives from gibuu, which means wolf in the Gitxsan and Nisga'a languages. In Tsimshian the word is gibaaw (gyibaaw or gyibaw), but Tsimshians still use the word Laxgibuu for Wolf clan.

The chief crest of the Laxgibuu is the Wolf. Other crests used by some matrilineal house-groups of the Laxgibuu include black bear.

Some Laxgibuu house-groups are related to Wolf clan groups among the Tahltan and Tlingit First Nations to the north. In the case of the Tlingit, the connection is through Tlingit Wolves who migrated south from what is now Alaska to escape inter-clan warfare and settled among the Tsimshian, Gitxsan, and Nisga'a. Descendants of some of these migrants share with their distant Tlingit relatives variants on the "Bear Mother" story which has been well recorded by anthropologists and folklorists. The Kitsumkalum Laxgibuu are one example of a Tsimshian Wolf group who own the right to tell this story.

== Nisga'a - Laxgibuu ==
Some Nisga'a Laxgibuu Wilp (House groups) include:

- Gitwilnaak'il Clan:
    - House of Duuḵ - William Moore
    - House of K'eex̱kw - Herbert Morven
    - House of Gwingyoo - Ben Gonu Sr. & Reginald Percival (prev. Leonard Robinson)
- Gisḵ'ansnaat Clan:
    - House of Sg̱at'iin - Isaac Guno
    - House of Ni'isyoḵ - Martin Adams
    - House of Gwisḵ'aayn - Gerald Robinson
- Gitlax̱t'iyooḵ Clan:
    - House of Bax̱k'ap - Jacob Nyce
    - House of Ax̱dii M̓in'aajax̱ - Gary Alexcee
    - House of W̓ii Gadim X̱sgaak - Clyde Azak
- Gitgigeenix Clan:
    - House of N̓agwa'un - (previously Rod Maxwell)
    - House of Ni'islisy̓aan - Edward Moore
    - House of Kw'ax̱suu - Floyde Stevens
    - House of Gints'aadax̱ - Henry Stephens
- Gitwilluuyaxw Clan:
    - House of Ksdiyaawaḵ - George Williams Sr.
- House of W̓ii Litskw: Calvin Morven
- House of Ax̱gwindaskw - Clifford Azak Sr.
- House of Aama Gat - Don Leeson (previously Gary Stevens)
- House of W̓ii Gwisyaxw - Arnie Stewart, Sr.
- House of X̱sduutgum Lax̱ha - Joe Calder

== Bibliography ==
- Barbeau, Marius (1929) Totem Poles of the Gitksan, Upper Skeena River, British Columbia. (Anthropological Series 12, National Museum of Canada Bulletin 61.) Ottawa: Canada, Department of Mines.
- Barbeau, Marius (1950) Totem Poles. (2 vols.) (Anthropology Series 30, National Museum of Canada Bulletin 119.) Ottawa: National Museum of Canada. Reprinted, Canadian Museum of Civilization, Hull, Quebec, 1990.
- Marsden, Susan (2001) "Defending the Mouth of the Skeena: Perspectives on Tsimshian Tlingit Relations." In: Perspectives in Northern Northwest Coast Prehistory, ed. by Jerome S. Cybulski, pp. 61–106. (Mercury Series, Archaeological Survey of Canada, Paper 160.) Hull, Quebec: Canadian Museum of Civilization
- McDonald, James A. (2003) People of the Robin: The Tsimshian of Kitsumkalum. CCI Press
- Council of Elders, Ayuuḵhl Nisg̱a'a Department & Nisg̱a'a Lisims Government (2008) Anhluut'ukwsim Saẁinskhl Nisg̱a'a: Nisg̱a'a Feast Procedures & Protocols Gitlax̱t'aamiks, British Columbia
