= National Register of Historic Places listings in Prince of Wales–Hyder Census Area, Alaska =

Location of the Prince of Wales-Hyder Census Area in Alaska

This is a list of the National Register of Historic Places listings in Prince of Wales–Hyder Census Area, Alaska.

This is intended to be a complete list of the properties and districts on the National Register of Historic Places in Prince of Wales–Hyder Census Area, Alaska, United States. The locations of National Register properties and districts for which the latitude and longitude coordinates are included below, may be seen in an online map.

There are 8 properties and districts listed on the National Register in the census area.

This National Park Service list is complete through NPS recent listings posted December 12, 2025.

== Current listing ==
	Name on the Register	Image	Date listed	Location	City or town	Description
1	Cape Decision Light Station	Cape Decision Light Station	February 2, 2005 (#04001568)	Southwestern extremity of Kuiu Island, about 18.5 miles (29.8 km) northwest of Edna Bay; 56°00′05″N 134°08′09″W	Edna Bay	
2	Chief Son-I-Hat's Whale House and Totems Historic District	Chief Son-I-Hat's Whale House and Totems Historic District	June 11, 2002 (#02000627)	About 0.5 miles (0.80 km) west of Kasaan, along Totem Park Trail; 55°32′28″N 132°25′08″W	Kasaan	
3	Father William Duncan House	Father William Duncan House	February 23, 1972 (#72001582)	501 Tait Street; 55°07′43″N 131°34′23″W	Metlakatla	Home of missionary William Duncan.
4	Karl Hansen House		August 31, 2023 (#100009304)	603a Main St. 56°14′54″N 134°38′51″W	Port Alexander	
5	Hydaburg Totem Park	Hydaburg Totem Park	June 16, 2006 (#06000491)	Corner of 5th Street and Main Street; 55°12′27″N 132°49′37″W	Hydaburg	
6	Kake Cannery	Kake Cannery	December 9, 1997 (#97001677)	About 1 mile (1.6 km) southeast of Kake; 56°57′53″N 133°55′32″W	Kake	
7	Storehouse No. 4	Storehouse No. 4	August 13, 1976 (#76002280)	International Street; 55°54′43″N 130°01′03″W	Hyder	
8	Wolf Creek Boatworks Historic District		June 3, 2025 (#100011911)	2 miles (3.2 km) NE of E end of Aurora Dr, Tongass National Forest; 55°31′11″N 132°34′34″W	Hollis	

== See also ==
- List of National Historic Landmarks in Alaska
- National Register of Historic Places listings in Alaska
