= Metlakatla Indian Community =

Federally recognized Alaska Native tribe

Metlakatla Indian Community Maxłakxaała (Tsimshian)
- Alaska Native village
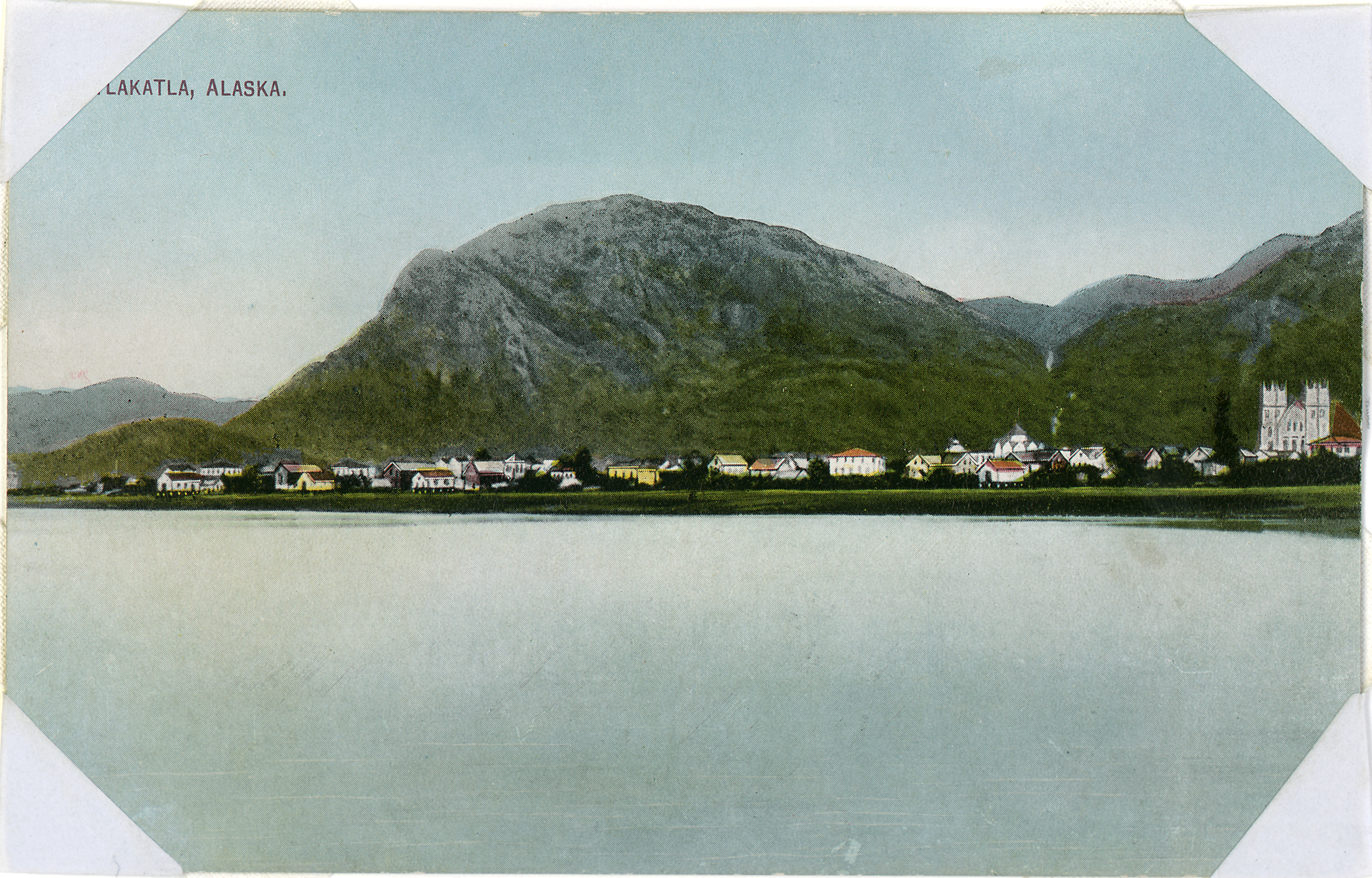
- Postcard of Metlakatla

- Metlakatla Indian Community
- Coordinates: 55°07′34″N 131°34′24″W
- Constitution Ratified: August 23, 1944; 82 years ago
- Capital: Metlakatla, Alaska

Government
  - Type: Representative democracy
  - Body: Metlakatla Tribal Council
  - Mayor: Albert G. Smith

Population (2022)
  - Estimate: 2,476
- Demonym: Tsimshian
- Time zone: UTC–09:00 (AKST)
  - Summer (DST): UTC–08:00 (AKDT)
- Website: metlakatla.com

The Metlakatla Indian Community, Annette Island Reserve is a federally recognized Alaska Native tribe of Tsimshian people. This Alaska Native tribe is headquartered in Metlakatla, Alaska (Tsimshian: Maxłakxaała, which means "saltwater passage"). Their landbase, the Annette Island Reserve is the only Indian reservation in Alaska.

== Government ==
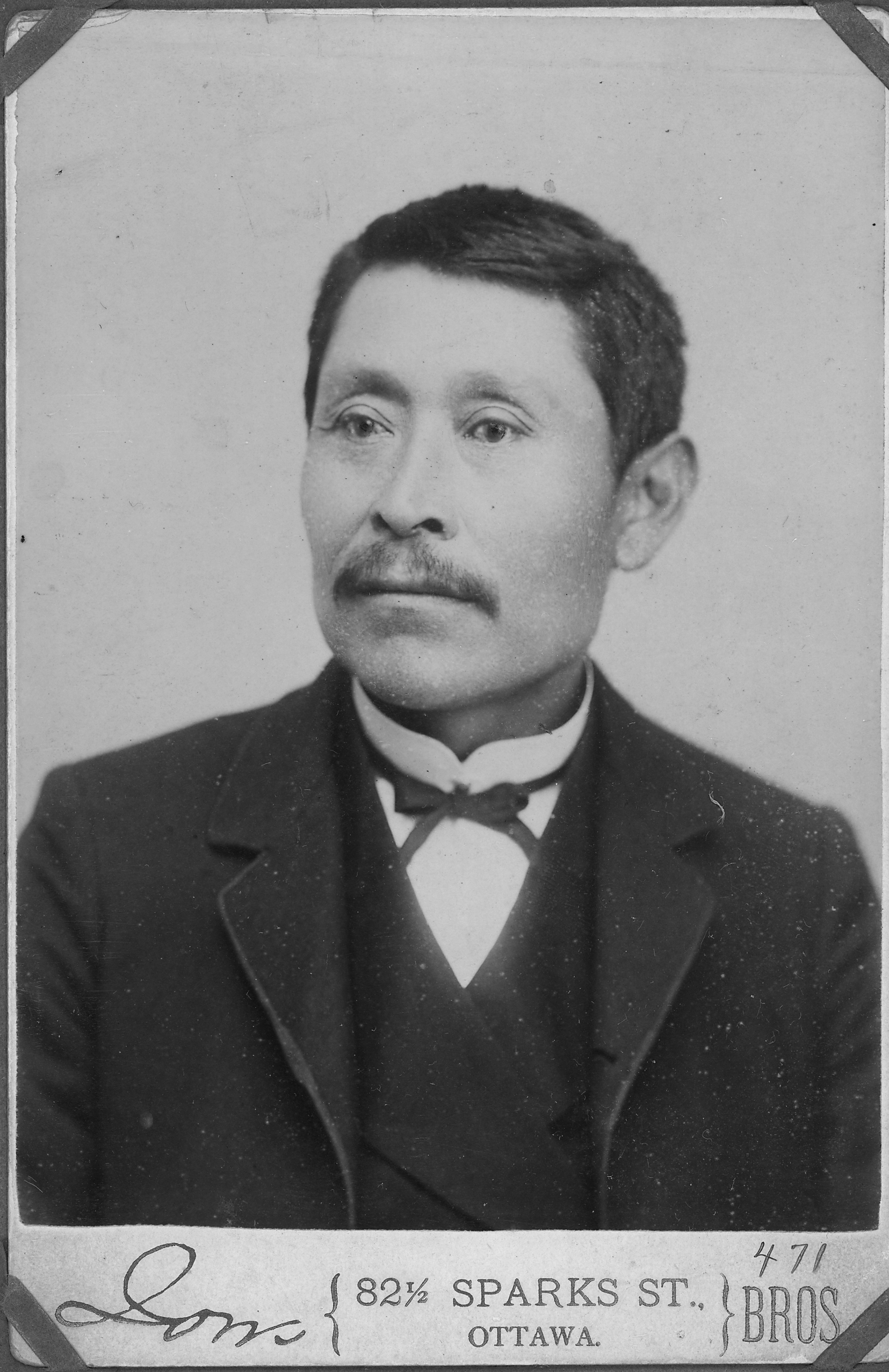
John Tait (Tsimshian), one of the founders of Metlakatla, Alaska

The Metlakatla Indian Community is led by a democratically elected tribal council. Its mayor is Albert G. Smith. The Metlakatla Agency of the Bureau of Indian Affairs serves the tribe. The tribe ratified its constitution and corporate charter in 1944 and amended it in 1949.

== Reservation ==
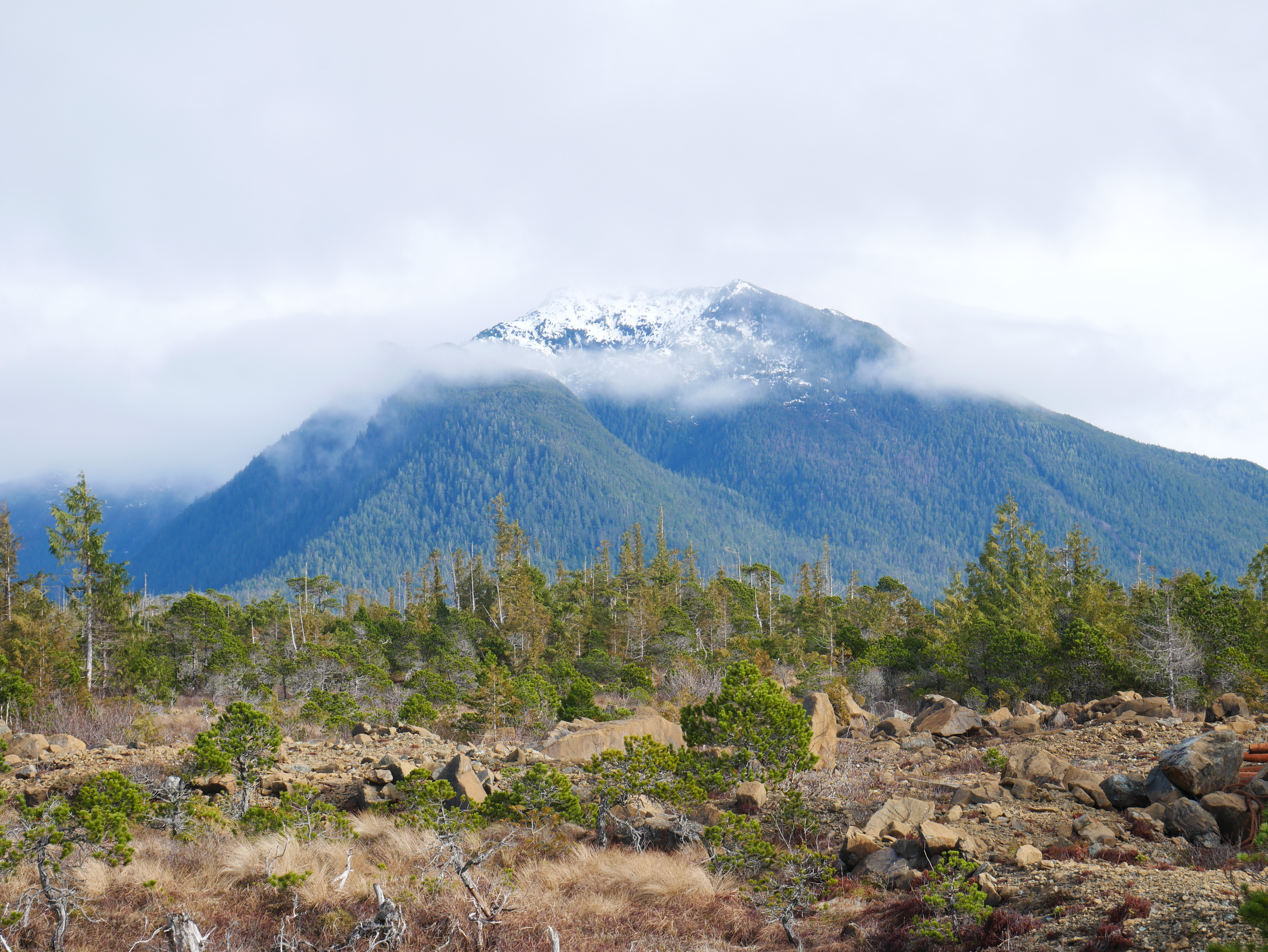
Scenery on Annette Island

The tribe migrated from "Old Metlakatla" in British Columbia with missionary William Duncan in 1891, and settled in Metlakatla, Alaska, or "New Metlakatla". They became a Tsimshian tribe in the United States.

The Annette Island Reserve is 86,000-acre reservation on Annette Island. The land and surrounding waters are under control of the tribe, not the state. The Alaska Marine Highway, a state ferry service, provides daily service off the island. The reservation is also accessible by plane but not by roads.

The Metlakatla WIC Clinic provided healthcare on the reservation.

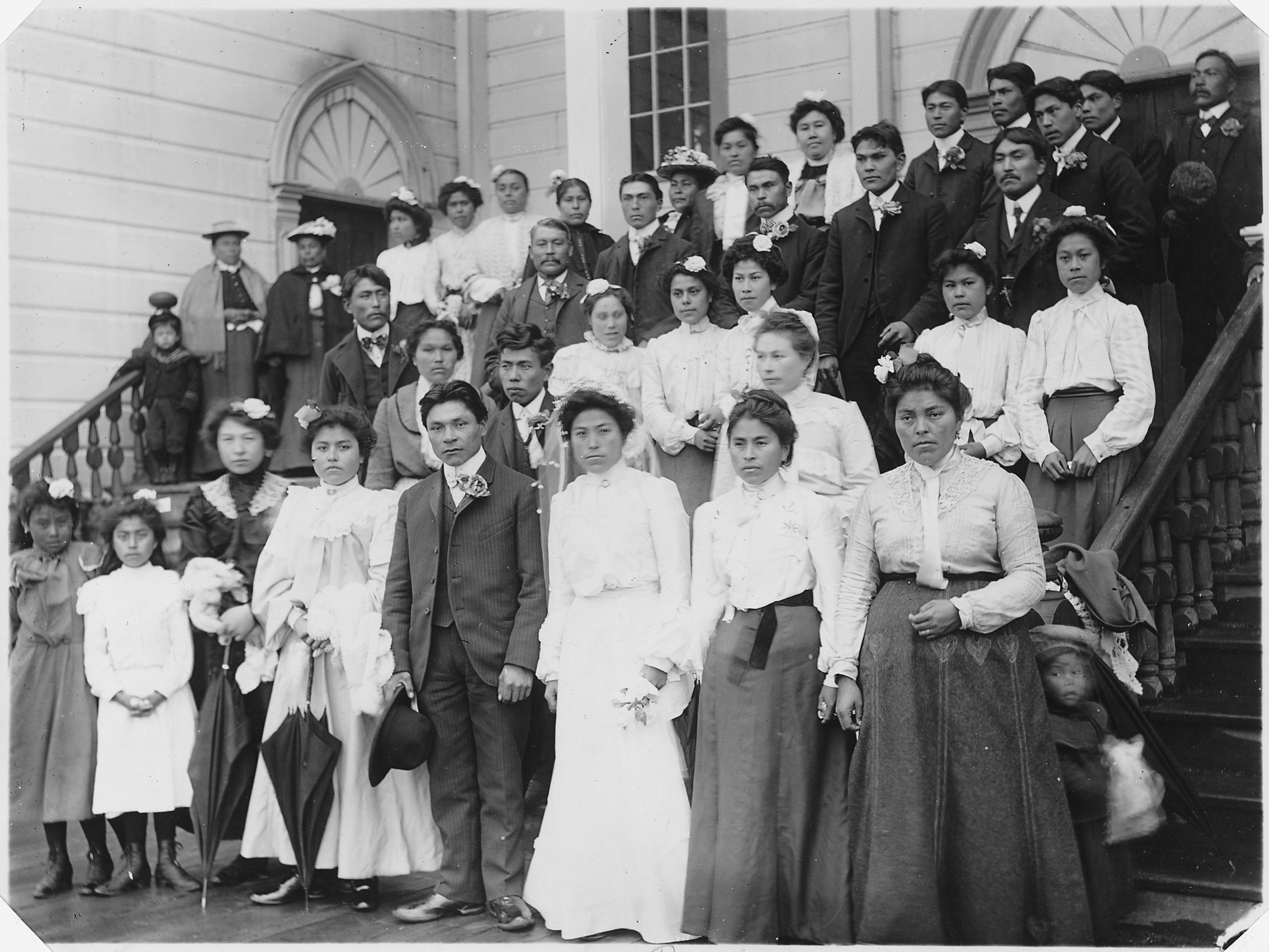
Gathering in front of the Metlakahtla Christian Mission Church following a wedding ceremony. Photography by Benjamin Haldane (Tsimshian)

The reservation surrounded by the Tongass National Forest and part of the Prince of Wales-Hyder Census Area.

Metlakatla is 8 nautical miles away from Ketchikan but not connected by highway, so travel off the island is airplane or boat.

== Economy ==
Fishing, harvesting seaweed, and hunting are important to the tribe's livelihood. The Metlakatla Indian Community is affiliated with Sealaska Corporation, an Alaska Native corporation.

== Language and culture ==
The Metlakatla Indian Community speaks English and the Tsimshian language.

== Notable tribal citizens ==
- David A. Boxley (born 1952), woodcarver, sculptor
- David R. Boxley (born 1981), woodcarver, sculptor
- Benjamin Haldane (1874–1941), photographer, businessman, and musician
- Edward Marsden (1869–1932), Anglican minister
- Peter Simpson (c. 1871–1947), Native American rights activist and one of the founders of Metlakatla, Alaska

== See also ==
- Metlakatla First Nation, First Nation in Metlakatla, British Columbia
- Sitka Tribe of Alaska, a federally recognized tribe with Tsimshian citizens
- Tsimshian cosmology
