= Father William Duncan House =

Historic house in Alaska, United States

- U.S. National Register of Historic Places
- Alaska Heritage Resources Survey
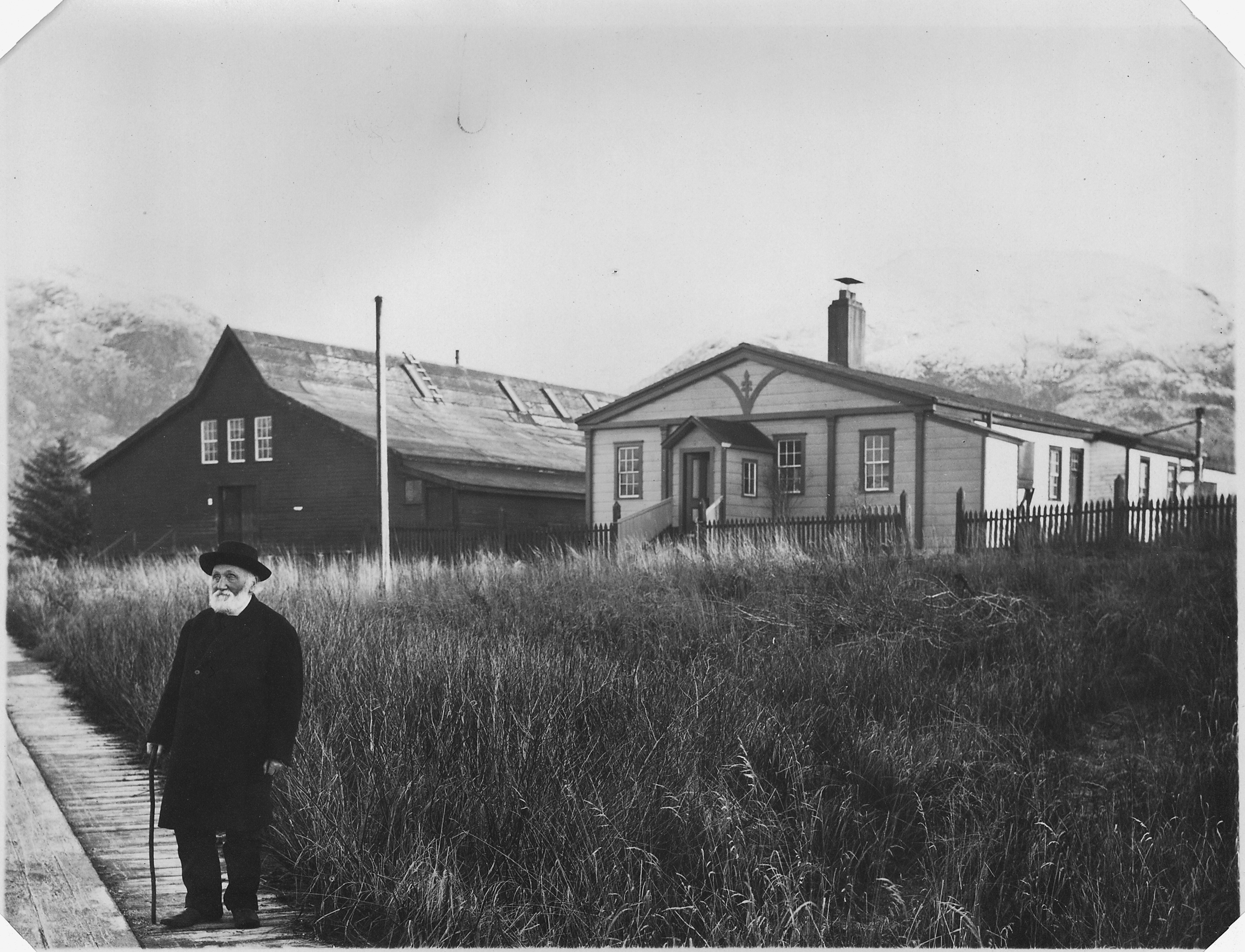
- William Duncan, then about age 84, stands in front of his store (left) and residence (right)

- Location within Alaska
- Location: 501 Tait Street, Metlakatla, Alaska
- Coordinates: 55°07′43″N 131°34′23″W
- Area: 0.2 acres (0.081 ha)
- Built: 1891
- NRHP reference No.: 72001582
- AHRS No.: KET-002

Significant dates
- Added to NRHP: February 23, 1972
- Designated AHRS: [date]

The Father William Duncan House, also known as the Father Duncan Cottage and now hosting the Duncan Cottage Museum, is a historic house located at 501 Tait Street in Metlakatla, Alaska. The single-story wood-frame structure was built in 1891 by the Tsimshian followers of the Anglican missionary William Duncan. It was one of the first structures built in Metlakatla after Duncan led a small number of followers there from the like-named village in British Columbia. The front facade is faced in shiplap siding, with four evenly spaced pilasters. There is decorative woodwork in the shallow-pitch gable end. Duncan was an influential leader of the community until his death in 1918.

The house was listed on the National Register of Historic Places in 1972.

== See also ==
- Metlakatla Indian Community, Metlakatla, Alaska
- National Register of Historic Places listings in Prince of Wales–Hyder Census Area, Alaska
