= John Wallace (woodcarver) =

Chief John Wallace (Haida) was a Haida people master carver who was commissioned in 1931 by the US Department of the Interior to carve two, 8-foot totem poles, "The Raven" and "The Chief's Daughter." These are in the collection of the Interior Museum. He also worked in Hydaburg Totem Park in the Tongass National Forest, Alaska.

Twenty-one totem poles were brought by the Civilian Conservation Corps and the US Forest Service to Hydaburg in the 1930s. Of these 21 poles, five were restored. The CCC and the US Forest Service commissioned the replication of 16 poles between 1939 and 1942. John Wallace was placed in charge of this effort

In 1939 John Wallace, considered the "last of the Professional Haida totem-carvers" was hired to demonstrated his pole carving at the Golden Gate International Exposition, Treasure Island.

John Wallace was taught to carve by this father, Dwight Wallace (Haida); however, due to pressures by missionary and economic pressures, John Wallace stopped carving and only began again late in life thanks to the financial support of federal government programs. This provided Wallace an opportunity to share his knowledge and techniques with young carvers.

One of Wallace's totem poles is located in Seattle at Lake Washington Ship Canal Waterside Trail.
