= Metlakatla =

Metlakatla may refer to:

- Metlakatla, Alaska (also known as New Metlakatla)
- Metlakatla, British Columbia
