= William Ridley (bishop) =

English missionary and bishop

- Bishop of Caledonia
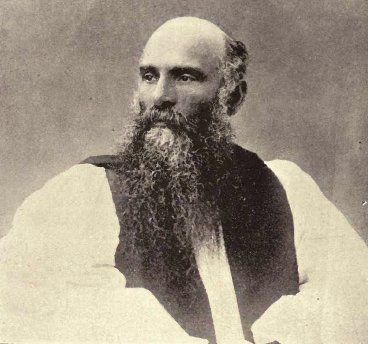
- Church: Church of England
- See: Caledonia
- In office: 1879–1905

Personal details
- Born: c. 1836 Devonshire, England
- Died: 25 May 1911 England

William Ridley (22 July 1836 – 25 May 1911) was an English missionary for the Church of England in Canada and served as Bishop of Caledonia.

== Life ==
Ridley was from Brixham Devonshire, England, and was the son of a stonemason. He was a carpenter before attending the Church Missionary Society's Islington Training School and being sent, in 1866, to missionize among Afghans in what was then the province of Peshawar in India. His rough time there, plagued by disease and low morale, lasted only three years. Next he served as priest of the Anglican church in Dresden from 1867–1872.

Returning to England, he became vicar of St Paul's Church in Huddersfield from 1874–1879. In 1879, Ridley was appointed Bishop of the newly created Diocese of Caledonia in northern British Columbia; he was consecrated a bishop, by Archibald Campbell Tait, Archbishop of Canterbury, on 25 July at St Paul's Cathedral; and he and his wife Jane set out for Canada. His appointment involved ensuring that missions under the Church Missionary Society (CMS) adhered to Anglican doctrine. This put him in direct conflict with William Duncan, the charismatic lay missionary in charge of the Tsimshian mission at Metlakatla, a utopian Christian community which was drifting from Anglican orthodoxy in the direction of Duncan's own low-church evangelicalism.

== Ridley-Duncan feud ==
In particular, Duncan refused to offer his parishioners holy communion on the grounds that it would whet their appetite for recently abandoned "cannibalistic" practices. Duncan also objected to Ridley's commitment to translating catechism into the Tsimshian language, which he eventually did, in collaboration Odille Morison, a Tsimshian. This became the so-called "Ridley orthography," the language's first practical spelling system. The Ridley-Duncan feud was fierce. At one point, Ridley's attempts to dislodge Duncan from Metlakatla led to a near-fistfight with Duncan's key convert, the Tsimshian chief Paul Legaic.

The conflict between Duncan and Ridley led to Duncan's expulsion from the CMS in 1881, Duncan's establishment of an independent, nondenominational church in Metlakatla, and eventually, in 1887, a migration to Alaska, where Duncan and approximately 800 Metlakatlans founded "New" Metlakatla, Alaska. Ridley's conflicts with Duncan continued after Duncan's departure to Alaska, focusing on serious accusations against Duncan's morals. After Duncan's departure, the 100 or so remaining residents of the mission "Old Metlakatla," as it was now sometimes known, were left in Ridley's charge.

== Final years and legacy ==
In July 1901 a fire destroyed St. Paul's Church at Metlakatla, demolishing what was said to have been the largest church north of San Francisco and west of Chicago, built by Duncan in 1874. Some sources indicate that the fire was started by a band of Alaska Tsimshians under Duncan's orders, including Peter Simpson, later the prominent Alaska Native rights activist. This tragic fire broke Ridley emotionally and led to his early retirement and departure for England in 1905.

He was succeeded as Metlakatla's preacher by the Reverend John Henry Keen. Ridley died May 25, 1911, in England. Ridley Island, now an industrial site near Prince Rupert, British Columbia, is named for him, as are numerous Tsimshian extended families with the Ridley surname in Metlakatla, Alaska, and in Hartley Bay and Kitkatla, British Columbia.
