= Benjamin Haldane =

Tsimshian First Nations photographer (1874-1941)

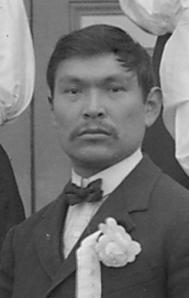
Benjamin Haldane, 1907

Benjamin Alfred Haldane (June 15, 1874 – November 21, 1941) was a Tsimshian professional photographer from Metlakatla, Alaska.

== Background ==
Benjamin Alfred Haldane was born on June 15, 1874, in the village of Metlakatla, British Columbia.

He was a full-blood member of the Tsimshian tribe, a First Nations people spanning British Columbia and Alaska. At the age of 13, Haldane migrated to the village of Metlakatla, Alaska, located on Annette Island, along with 800 other Tsimshian people. They made the 30-mile journey by canoe, seeking secure land rights and religious freedom with the missionary William Duncan.

Haldane's parents were Matthias (Matthew) Haldane and Caroline Auriol. Haldane married his first wife, Martha Calvert, on November 17, 1896, and together the couple had 11 children. Martha died in 1918. Haldane married again before 1938 to his second wife, Margaret.

He was a successful merchant and grocer, who served as his village's secretary for 35 years. In 1903, Haldane began teaching music and was respected for his musical abilities throughout southeast Alaska. For 38 years, he was the organist and choir master at the William Duncan Memorial Church and led the Metlakatla Concert Band.

== Art career ==
Portrait photograph of Tsimshian family by Benjamin Haldane

Haldane took up photography in the late 19th century, as did his brother Henry Haldane and Thomas Eaton, also Tsimshian. At the age of 25, in 1899, Haldane opened his own portrait studio.

He maintained his studio and actively documented the people of his community from the 1890s to approximately 1910. He specialized in portrait photography and his works are carefully composed. They show the Tsimshian at a time of great transition. Families and individuals posed in Western clothing of their day. They are photographed inside with props and backdrops or outside. He photographed events such as weddings or concerts by his marching band. As a community insider, he was able to achieve an intimate look at the Tsimshian people. He was also able to photograph potlatches, outlawed at the time, along the Nass River.

== Legacy ==
Haldane died on November 21, 1941, from pulmonary tuberculosis. He is buried in Ocean View Cemetery in Metlakatla.

His photographs have been increasingly exhibited in recent decades. This revived interest in his work was sparked by Dennis Dunne, who rescued 162 original glass plate negatives of Haldane's photographs from the dump on Annette Island in the 1990s.

The Tongass Historical Museum curated Metlakatla: Vintage Photographs in 2006, which featured 36 of prints of his photographs. Also in 2006, his work was included in Our People, Our Land, Our Images, an exhibition of indigenous photographers at the C.N. Gorman Museum at the University of California, Davis, curated by Hulleah Tsinhnahjinnie. That shows also traveled to the Burke Museum of Natural History and Culture in Seattle, Washington. in 2007.
