= Thomas Crosby (missionary) =

English Methodist missionary

Thomas Crosby (21 June 1840 – 13 January 1914) was an English Methodist missionary known for his work among the First Nations people of coastal British Columbia, Canada.

== Biography ==
Thomas Crosby was born in 1840 in Pickering, Yorkshire, to (Wesleyan) Methodist parents. His father was a farmer. When he was sixteen, he emigrated with his parents to the vicinity of Woodstock, Ontario. Economic circumstances forced him to go to work at a tannery.

In 1861 he answered a call in a Methodist newspaper for missionaries to go to British Columbia. Soon after arriving in B.C. in 1863, he was sent to teach at the Native school in Nanaimo, B.C. In 1866 he became an itinerant preacher, accompanying the Rev. Edward White on a preaching circuit covering Vancouver Island, the Gulf Islands, and the area around Vancouver. In 1869 Crosby was appointed a stable position preaching and teaching in Chilliwack, B.C. He was ordained in 1871 and began intensively missionizing throughout the province.

In 1873, at a revival meeting in Victoria, he converted Elizabeth Diex, a Tsimshian matriarch from Lax Kw'alaams (a.k.a. Port Simpson) on the northern coast of B.C., and later also converted her son Chief Alfred Dudoward and daughter-in-law Kate Dudoward. At that time, Lax Kw'alaams was without a minister and oriented around a Hudson's Bay Company fort with its attendant social problems. The Church of England had abandoned the community in 1862 when the local Anglican lay missionary, William Duncan (coincidentally, like Crosby, a former tanner from Yorkshire), had taken a portion of his Tsimshian flock to found the nearby utopian Christian community of Metlakatla, B.C. Alfred and Kate Dudoward pressed the Methodist church to commit a missionary to their village, and in 1874 Crosby was sent there. Initially, his arrival caused Duncan to intensify his efforts to convert Lax Kw'alaams people from his new home base at Metlakatla.

The Dudowards eventually drifted away from the strict Methodist opposition to Native traditions like potlatching. Though he learned to speak the Tsimshian language, Crosby insisted on the abandonment of most Native traditions. One of the keystones of Crosby's relationship with the Lax Kw'alaams Tsimshian was a convert named Victoria Young or "Queen Victoria", a chieftainess of the Giluts'aaw tribe.

Crosby's wife, Emma Crosby, founded the Crosby Girls' Home in the community in the 1880s. It became part of B.C.'s residential school system in 1893 and was closed in 1948.

Under Crosby's direction, the Methodist missionary presence in northern B.C. expanded from Lax Kw'alaams to include ten missions, and, using Lax Kw'alaams as a base, he supervised mission work among the Nisga'a, Haida, Gitxsan, and other groups in addition to the Tsimshian.

In 1892 Crosby developed asthma and began to tire of mission work. In 1897 he was made chairman of the British Columbia Conference of the Methodist Church of Canada and left Lax Kw'alaams to take charge of the newly subdivided mission district covering Lowe Inlet, Bella Bella, and parts of Vancouver Island.

Lax Kw'alaams is still a strongly Methodist community, now under the rubric of the United Church of Canada, which incorporates the Methodist church. A mission boat named the Thomas Crosby operated up and down B.C.'s Inside Passage for much of the twentieth century.

Crosby published three volumes of memoirs about his work among B.C.'s First Nations, including David Sallosalton, named for an early protégé of Crosby's, a catechist from the Coast Salish people. Up and down the North Pacific Coast by Canoe and Mission Ship describes his Lax Kw'alaams years.

== Bibliography ==
- Bolt, Clarence (1992) Thomas Crosby and the Tsimshian: Small Shoes for Feet Too Large. Vancouver: University of British Columbia Press.
- Crosby, Thomas (1906) David Sallosalton. Toronto: Department of Missionary Literature of the Methodist Church.
- Crosby, Thomas (1907) Among the An-ko-me-nums or Flathead Tribes of Indians of the Pacific Coast. Toronto: William Briggs.
- Crosby, Thomas (1914) Up and down the North Pacific Coast by Canoe and Mission Ship. Toronto: Missionary Society of the Methodist Church.
- Hare, Jan, and Jean Barman (2006) Good Intentions Gone Awry: Emma Crosby and the Methodist Mission on the Northwest Coast. Afterword by Caroline Dudoward. Vancouver: UBC Press.
- Neylan, Susan (2003) The Heavens Are Changing: Nineteenth-Century Protestant Missions and Tsimshian Christianity. Montreal: McGill-Queen's University Press
