= Edward Marsden =

Canadian-American missionary

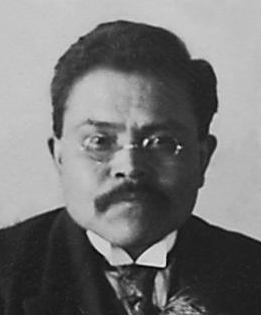
Rev. Edward Marsden

The Rev. Edward Marsden (1869–1932) was a Canadian-American missionary and member of the Tsimshian nation who became the first Alaska Native to be ordained in the ministry.

== Early life ==
He was born May 19, 1869, in Metlakatla, British Columbia, and became from his earliest years a protégé of that utopian Christian community's founder, the charismatic Anglican lay minister William Duncan. Edward's father, Samuel Marsden, who was known as Shooquanahd prior to baptization, had been Duncan's first convert, and was named after a famed Anglican missionary. Edward's mother was Catherine Kitlahn, Duncan's housekeeper. Duncan tutored young Edward in reading, music, and eventually bookkeeping and business. As a teenager, Marsden was one of the approximately 800 Tsimshians who undertook an epic canoe voyage in 1887 to found Duncan's new, dissident community of "New Metlakatla" on Annette Island in the very southeast of Alaska.

Duncan exercised fierce control over his parishioners' lives and for a while barred the young, ambitious Marsden from leaving the island to pursue higher education. Eventually, the Presbyterian missionary Sheldon Jackson intervened and persuaded Duncan to let Marsden join him in Sitka, Alaska, to attend the industrial school there (now known as Sheldon Jackson College).

There he became Jackson's own protégé, earning high marks, learning to preach, and gradually shifting from Duncan's low-church Anglicanism towards conversion to Presbyterianism.

Jackson arranged for Marsden to attend the Carlisle Indian School in Pennsylvania and then Marietta College in Ohio, making him the first Alaska Native to receive higher education in the "lower 48." During his education there, he joined the Presbyterian Church, deepening his schism with Duncan. In 1894 he became a U.S. citizen, the first Alaska Native to do so. He attended Lane Theological Seminary in Cincinnati, Ohio, from which he graduated in 1898, becoming ordained the same year in Athens, Ohio. Also, in 1897 he became the first North American Indian to be licensed to preach in the U.S.

== Career ==
Duncan refused to find a position for Marsden in Metlakatla, and was especially opposed to Marsden's suggestion that a Presbyterian church be established on Annette Island to minister to the Tlingit families on the island. The island was (and is) still the unceded territory of the Tongass tribe of Tlingit, who were then, as now, a predominantly Presbyterian people.

Instead, under Jackson's direction, Marsden was installed as minister at the Tlingit community of Saxman, near Ketchikan. The establishment of that mission consolidated that community's position as a gathering place for various Tlingit subgroups of the area. From here he participated in a fierce rivalry with Duncan for Tsimshian loyalties, including participating in a campaign to have Duncan removed by the Bureau of Indian Affairs (BIA). His complaints, and those of many in the community, focused on Duncan's control over the community's entire economic life and his opposition to his flock's seeking any economic or educational betterment off of the island.

Marsden married Lucy Kinninook, the young woman whose job was to translate Marsden's English sermons into Tlingit. She was a Tlingit chief's daughter and had been partially raised by the missionary Thomas Crosby in the Tsimshian community of Lax Kw'alaams (a.k.a. Port Simpson), B.C. Duncan refused to perform their marriage on the grounds that she was a divorcée.

Marsden was also involved in the short-lived sawmill community of Port Gravina, near Ketchikan, which was founded in 1892 and burned to the ground in 1904. This was an offshoot of the Metlakatla community, committed to Presbyterianism rather than Anglicanism and oriented to individual economic advancement outside of Duncan's control.

After Duncan's death in 1918, Marsden was involved in the transition to new leadership, becoming a partner in running the Metlakatla Commercial Company, the community's economic engine.

In 1922, Marsden began construction of a Presbyterian church in Metlakatla, where he was to serve as minister until his death. He was also a political leader in the community.

== Death ==
In May 1932 Marsden died in Ketchikan of injuries sustained during a rough sea voyage between Metlakatla and Hydaburg, Alaska.

== Legacy ==
A comparison of two accounts—a 1955 biography of Marsden by William Gilbert Beattie, a Presbyterian BIA superintendent who had been allied with him, and on the other hand Peter Murray's very pro-Duncan account of the controversies in his 1985 Duncan biography (see bibliography) – will attest to the strong feelings that the Duncan-Marsden rivalry continue to give rise to among those with a stake in the Metlakatla community.

== Bibliography ==
- Beattie, William Gilbert (1955) Marsden of Alaska: A Modern Indian Minister, Missionary, Musician, Engineer, Pilot, Boat Builder, and Church Builder. New York: Vantage Press.
- Johnson, Gertrude Mather (1994) "The Life of Peter Simpson." In Haa Kusteeyí, Our Culture: Tlingit Life Stories, ed. by Nora Marks Dauenhauer and Richard Dauenhauer, pp. 665–676. Seattle: University of Washington Press.
- Murray, Peter (1985) The Devil and Mr. Duncan. Victoria, B.C.: Sono Nis Press.
- Neylan, Susan (2003) The Heavens Are Changing: Nineteenth-Century Protestant Missions and Tsimshian Christianity. Montreal: McGill-Queen's University Press.
- "Called to Build: Edward Marsden." The Continent. Published by the Board of National Missions of the Presbyterian Church in the U.S.A. New York, NY

== Archival Collections ==
The Presbyterian Historical Society in Philadelphia, Pennsylvania, has a single letter written by Edward Marsden. In the letter, he describes the death of William Duncan and his own work in Alaska.
