= Chief Son-I-Hat's Whale House and Totems Historic District =

Historic district in Alaska, United States

- U.S. National Register of Historic Places
- U.S. Historic district
- Alaska Heritage Resources Survey
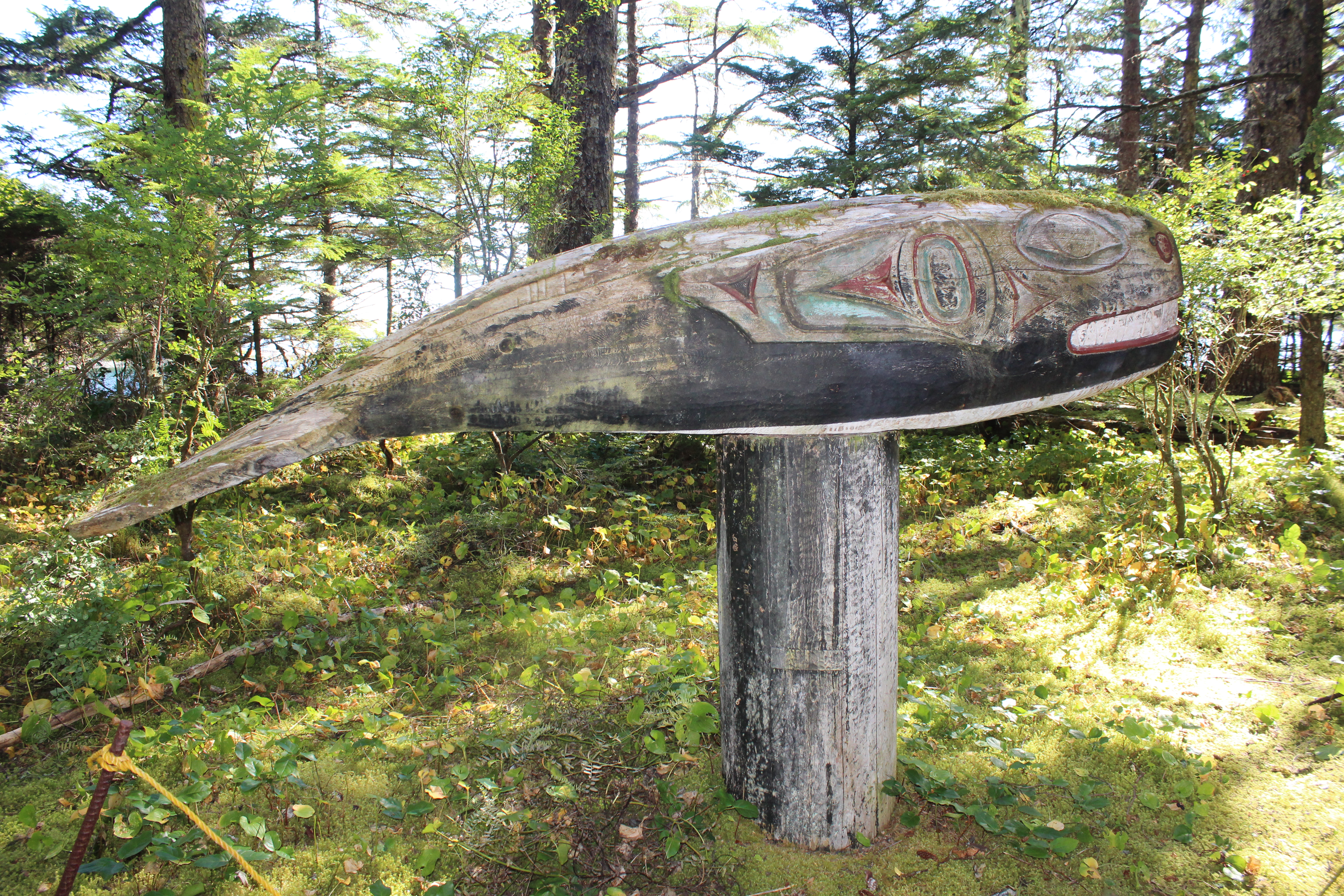
- Whale totem

- Location within Alaska
- Location: About 0.5 miles (0.80 km) west of Kasaan, along Totem Park Trail
- Nearest city: Kasaan
- Coordinates: 55°32′28″N 132°25′08″W
- Area: 7.5 acres (3.0 ha)
- Built: 1904
- NRHP reference No.: 02000627
- AHRS No.: CRG-00018
- Added to NRHP: June 11, 2002

The Chief Son-I-Hat's Whale House and Totems Historic District, also known as the New Kasaan Totem Pole Park, is a historic district encompassing the relocated remnants of Old Kasaan, a historic village of the Haida people in Prince of Wales–Hyder Census Area, Alaska. Now located in new Kasaan, the property includes the c. 1880 clan house of Chief Son-I-Hat, the Haida leader who oversaw the relocation of the people from Old to New Kasaan, and a totem pole he moved. In the 1930s, crews from the Civilian Conservation Corps relocated and/or replicated additional totem poles at the house site, restored the house, constructed a small park, and cut a trail from the center of new Kasaan to the park and adjacent cemeteries.

The site was listed on the National Register of Historic Places in 2002.

== See also ==
- National Register of Historic Places listings in Prince of Wales–Hyder Census Area, Alaska
