= Storehouse No. 4 =

- U.S. National Register of Historic Places
- Alaska Heritage Resources Survey
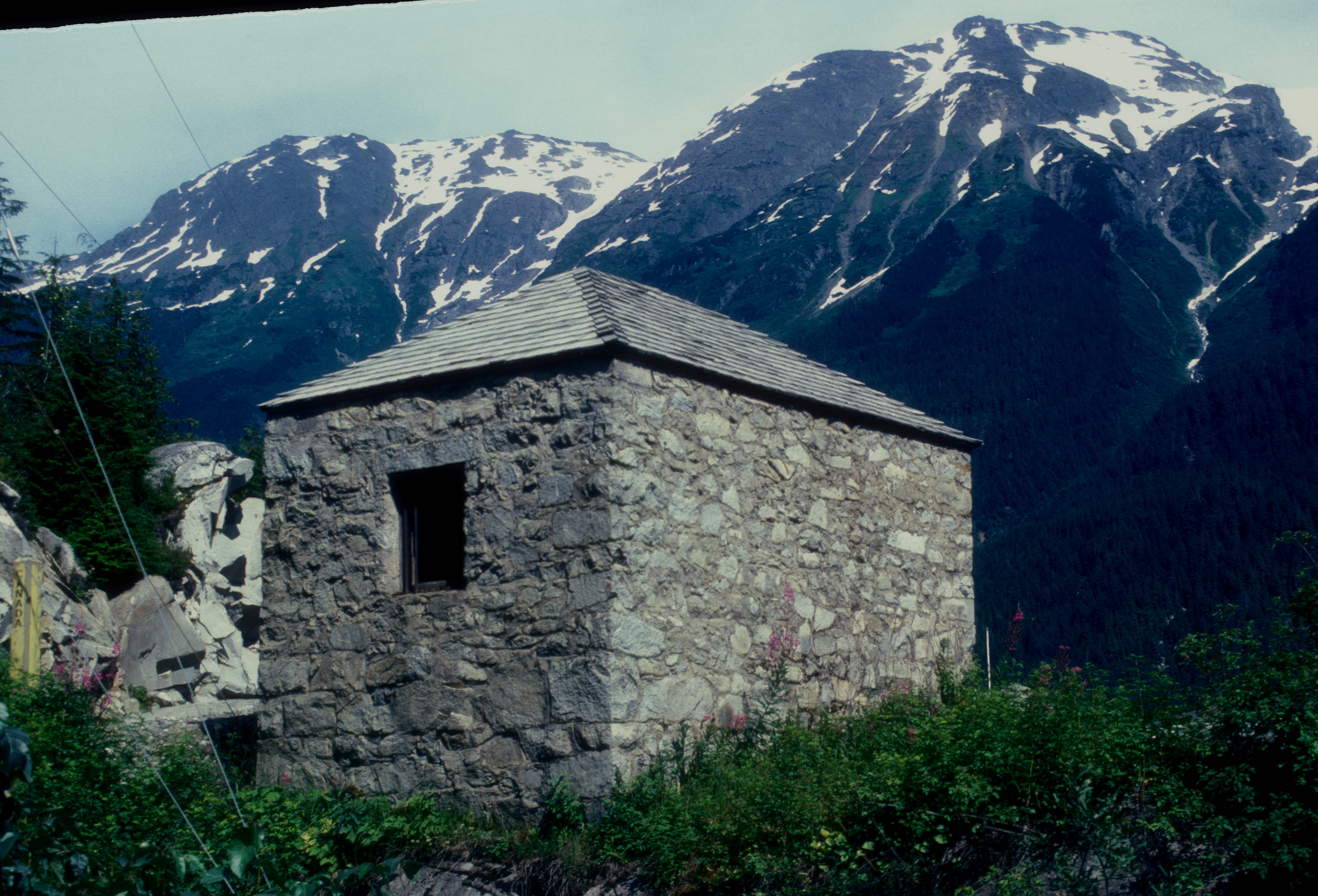

- Location within Alaska
- Location: International Street, Hyder, Alaska
- Coordinates: 55°54′43″N 130°01′03″W
- Area: 1 acre (0.40 ha)
- Built: 1896
- Built by: Captain David du Bose Gaillard
- NRHP reference No.: 76002280
- AHRS No.: KET-030

Significant dates
- Added to NRHP: August 13, 1976
- Designated AHRS: July 1973

Storehouse No. 4, also known as the Eagle Point Storehouse, is an historic storehouse located on International Street in Hyder, Alaska. It was built in 1896 under supervision of engineer David du Bose Gaillard. It was listed on the National Register of Historic Places in 1976.

Its interior dimensions are 10 by 15 feet (3.0 m × 4.6 m) and its walls are 12 to 18 inches thick; along with three similar other storehouses it served the Portland Canal (a 71-mile (114 km) fjord, not truly a canal). It is one of the first masonry structures to be built in Alaska. The reason for its construction is uncertain from period documents, but it appears to have been related to the Alaska boundary dispute with Canada. This dispute was resolved by arbitration in 1903, resulting in the transfer in 1906 of the territories containing two of the other three storehouses to Canada.

== See also ==
- Storehouse No. 3
- National Register of Historic Places listings in Prince of Wales–Hyder Census Area, Alaska
