= Storehouse No. 3 =

- U.S. National Register of Historic Places
- Alaska Heritage Resources Survey
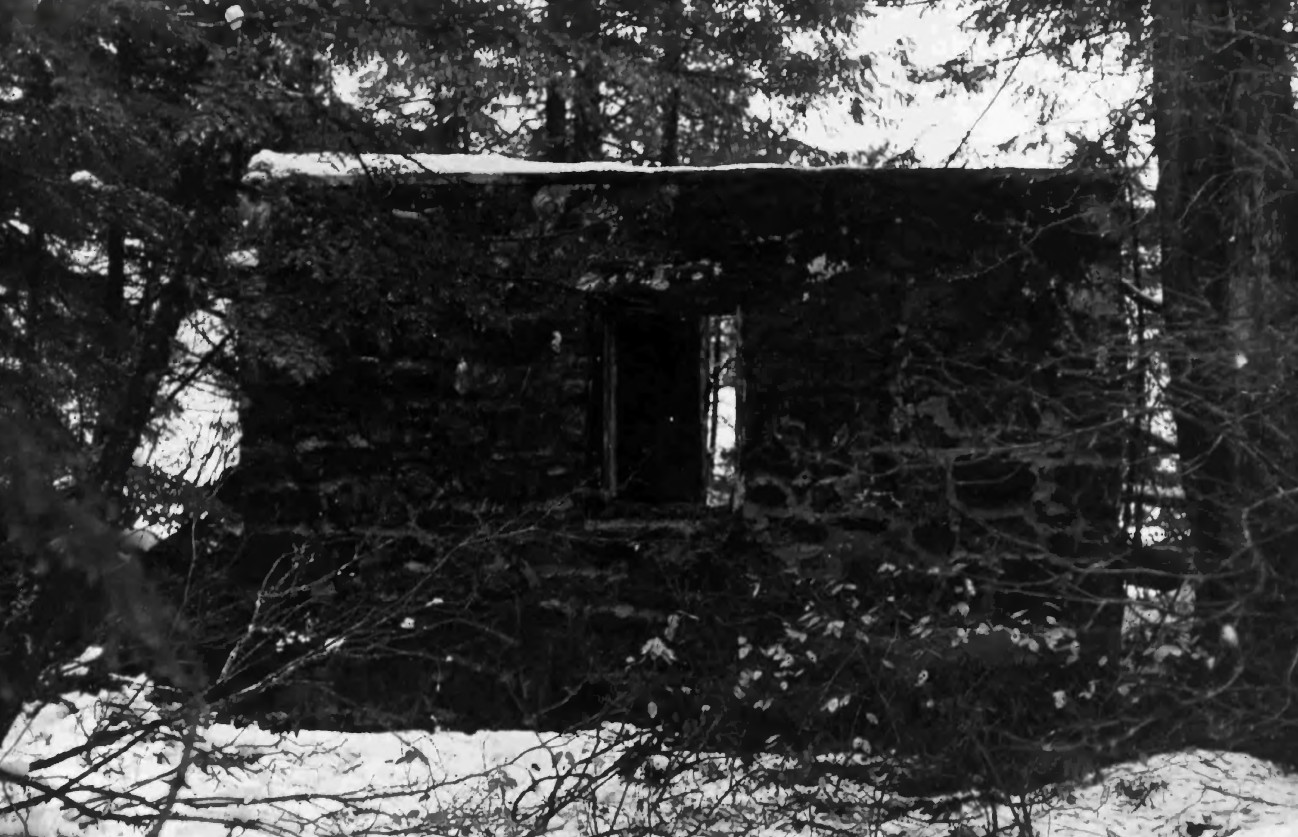
- 1975 photo, US Army Corps of Engineers

- Location within Alaska
- Nearest city: Ketchikan, Alaska
- Coordinates: 55°14′7″N 130°6′11″W
- Area: less than one acre
- Built: 1896
- Built by: Captain David du Bose Gaillard
- NRHP reference No.: 77001575
- AHRS No.: KET-029

Significant dates
- Added to NRHP: December 7, 1977
- Designated AHRS: July 1973

Storehouse No. 3 is one of four historic storehouses built by the United States Army along the Portland Canal on the west coast of North America. Built out of rubble stone in 1896, they were built at a time of tension with neighboring Canada over exact location of the international border in the area. The border location was resolved by arbitration in 1903, with two of the four warehouses falling in Canadian territory. None of the warehouses were apparently ever used. Storehouse No. 3 is located on Halibut Bay, on the northwest side of the Portland Canal. The storehouse was listed on the National Register of Historic Places in 1977.

== See also ==
- Storehouse No. 4, which is also in US territory near Hyder
- National Register of Historic Places listings in Ketchikan Gateway Borough, Alaska
