= Peter Simpson (Native rights activist) =

Canadian-born Tsimshian activist

Peter Simpson

Peter Simpson (1871?–1947) was a Canadian-born Tsimshian activist for Alaska Native rights, and co-owner of the first Indian-owned business in Alaska.

== Biography ==
Peter Simpson was most likely born July 4, 1871, in Metlakatla, British Columbia or Lax Kw'alaams (a.k.a. Port Simpson), B.C., though there is conflicting information on his date and place of birth. He was listed as twenty-three years old in 1887 when approximately 800 Tsimshians from "Old Metlakatla," B.C., founded the community of "New Metlakatla," Alaska. He was a member of the Gispwudwada (Killerwhale clan) of the Tsimshian and was raised by an uncle and aunt, Henry and Alice Ridley. He was also related to the Rev. Edward Marsden.

He was well liked by the Anglican lay minister William Duncan, founder of the Christian utopian communities at both Old and New Metlakatla. When Simpson was a young man, he was one of the eight people sent in a canoe by Duncan from New Metlakatla to dismantle the church they had left behind at Old Metlakatla. In one version of the story they hacked it to pieces and burned it to the ground and escaped back to Alaska before they could face prosecution. Not all histories of Old Metlakatla record this as the cause of the fire that destroyed the church in 1901; the story may arise from a much earlier incident.

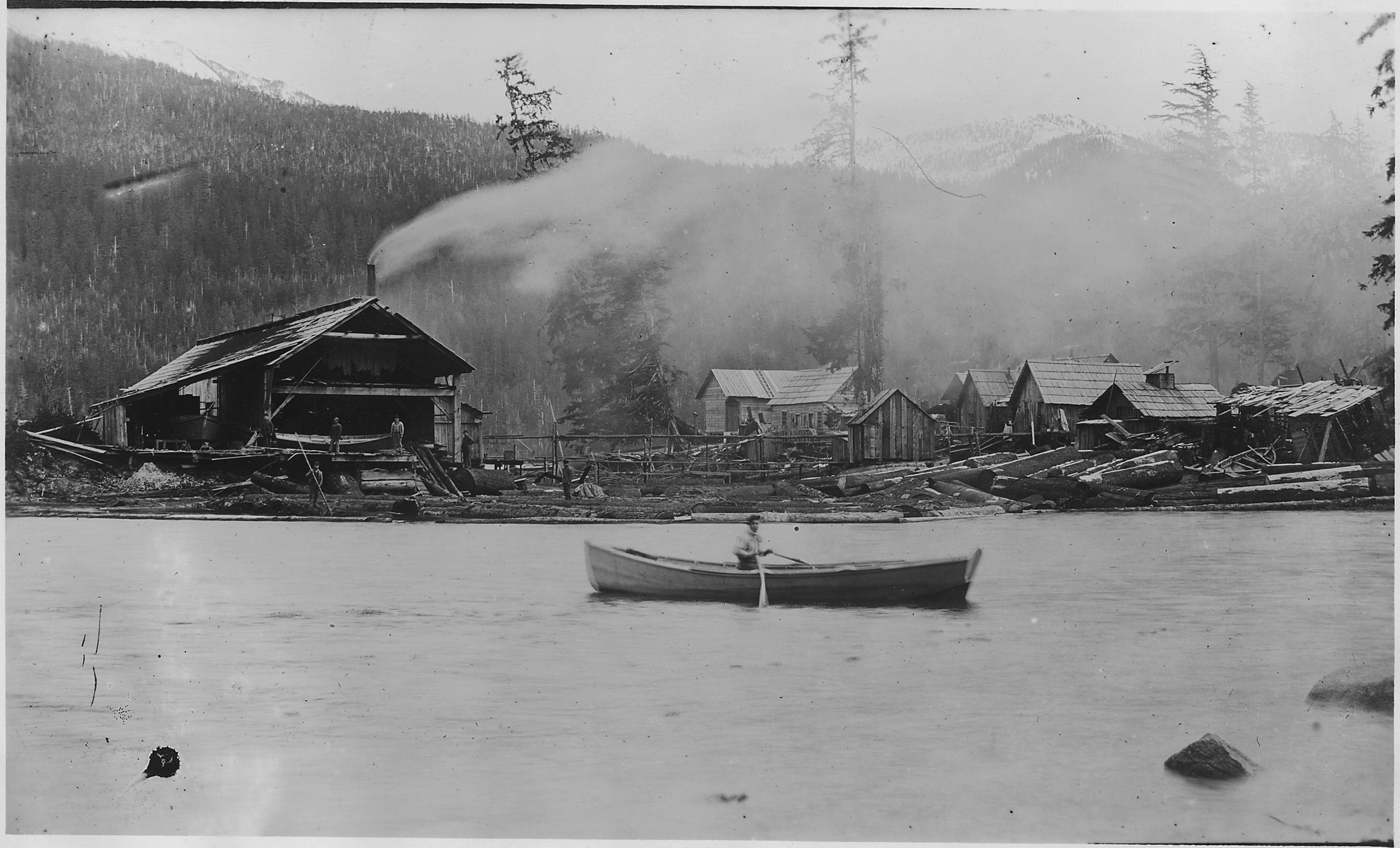
Hamilton & Simpson sawmill, Port Gravina, 1895

Simpson along with another Metlakatla Tsimshian, Mark Hamilton, were the principal investors in the sawmill community of Port Gravina, near Ketchikan, Alaska, from its founding in 1892 until it burned in 1904. This was an offshoot of the Metlakatla community, one committed to Presbyterianism under Marsden. After the fire, Simpson moved to Juneau, and then to Sitka where he was the owner of a boatbuilding business.

In 1912, Simpson became chairman of the committee that was eventually to form the Alaska Native Brotherhood (ANB), and the committee's only non-Tlingit member. He is considered the father of the ANB and also "the father of Land Claims" in Alaska, the long process that led to the Alaska Native Claims Settlement Act (without Metlakatla's participation), long after his death.

Simpson is widely known for his famous quotation, uttered to the Tlingit land-claims activist William Paul at the 1925 ANB convention: "Willie, who owns this land?" William Paul (after a long pause): "We do." Peter Simpson: "Then fight for it." One biography of Paul, Then Fight for It, by Fred Paul (William's son), derives its title from this exchange.

Simpson helped build Sitka's sawmill in 1935 and was closely involved in the life of the Sheldon Jackson School there (later Sheldon Jackson College). The school's workboat the SJS was built by Simpson in 1936, and in 1942 it became a U.S. Navy patrol boat.

Simpson's wife, Mary Sloan, was a Tlingit from Sitka. They raised fifteen children. He died December 27, 1947, in Sitka.

== Bibliography ==
- Johnson, Gertrude Mather (1994) "The Life of Peter Simpson." In Haa Kusteeyí, Our Culture: Tlingit Life Stories, ed. by Nora Marks Dauenhauer and Richard Dauenhauer, pp. 665–676. Seattle: University of Washington Press.
