= Hydaburg Totem Park =

- U.S. National Register of Historic Places
- U.S. Historic district
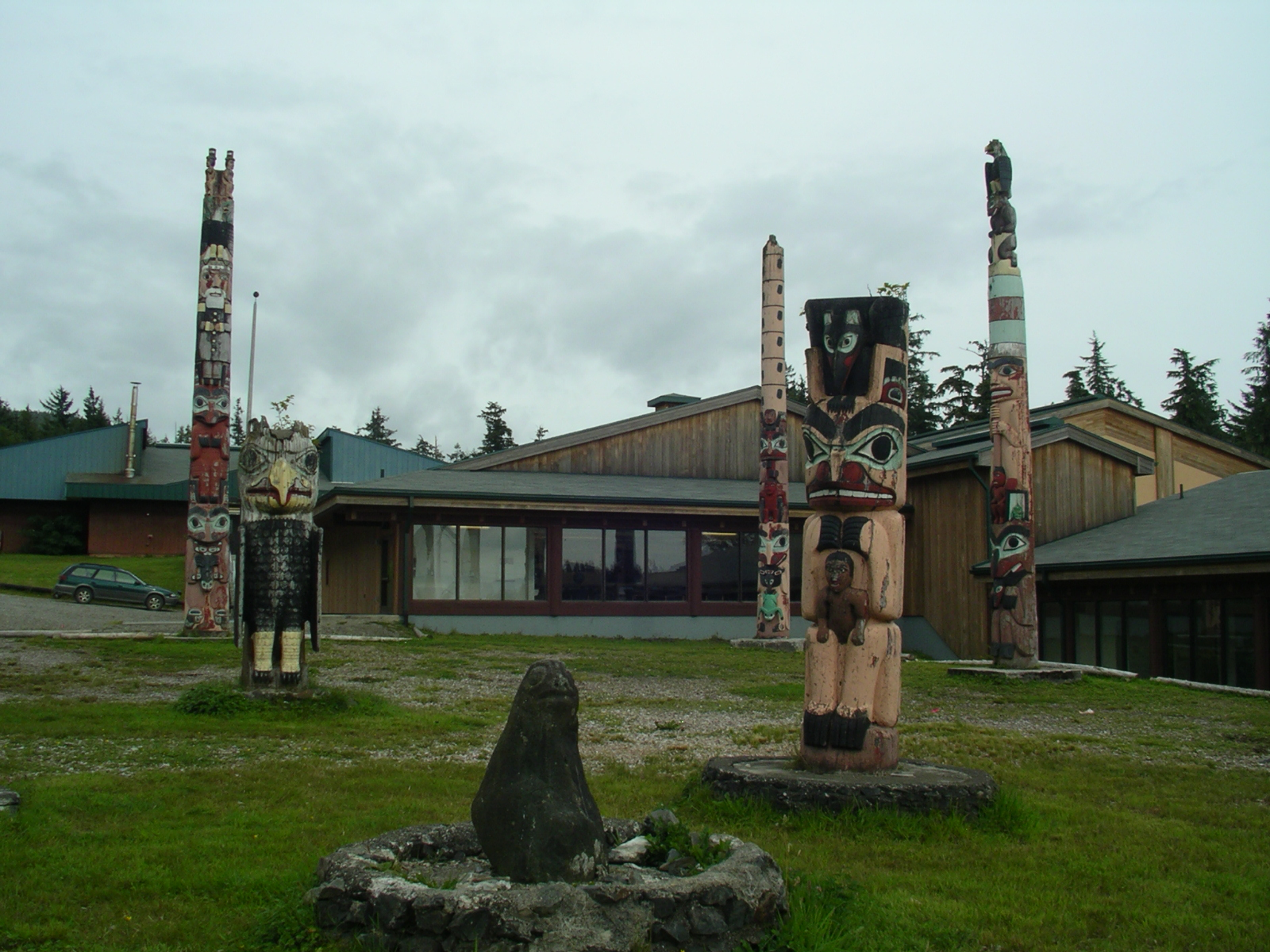

- Location within Alaska
- Location: Corner of 5th Street and Main Street, Hydaburg, Alaska
- Coordinates: 55°12′27″N 132°49′37″W
- Area: less than one acre
- Built: 1939
- Built by: John Wallace; Civilian Conservation Corps; United States Forest Service; US Indian Service
- NRHP reference No.: 06000491
- Added to NRHP: June 16, 2006

The Hydaburg Totem Park is a city park in the small community of Hydaburg, Alaska, located on the western side of Prince of Wales Island in southeastern Alaska. The park is also part of the many parks inside the Tongass National Forest. The park, created in 1939, contains a collection of preserved and recreated totem poles, based on originals collected from small communities abandoned by the Haida people to form Hydaburg. The old totem poles were brought to the park by crews from the Civilian Conservation Corps, and were recreated and preserved under the guidance of Haida master carvers. The park has been the subject of a major restoration effort in the 2010s. The old totem poles, that were removed from the park, remain in outdoor storage near the old cannery in the downtown area of the village.

The totem park is located on top of a hill, next to the church and the public school. The park has a panoramic view of the water.

The park was listed on the National Register of Historic Places in 2006.

== See also ==
- National Register of Historic Places listings in Prince of Wales–Hyder Census Area, Alaska
