= Hydaburg, Alaska =

City in Alaska, U.S.

Hydaburg
- City
- Location in Alaska
- Coordinates: 55°12′17″N 132°49′15″W
- Country: United States
- State: Alaska
- Incorporated: October 4, 1927

Government
  - Mayor: Anthony Christianson
  - State senator: Bert Stedman (R)
  - State rep.: Rebecca Himschoot (I)

Area
  - Total: 0.29 sq mi (0.76 km^{2})
  - Land: 0.29 sq mi (0.76 km^{2})
  - Water: 0.0039 sq mi (0.01 km^{2})
- Elevation: 23 ft (7 m)

Population (2020)
  - Total: 380
  - Density: 1,302.6/sq mi (502.92/km^{2})
- Time zone: UTC-9 (Alaska (AKST))
  - Summer (DST): UTC-8 (AKDT)
- ZIP code: 99922
- Area code: 907
- FIPS code: 02-34460
- GNIS feature ID: 1422709, 2419401

Hydaburg (/ˈhaɪdəbɜːrɡ/ HY-də-burg) (Haida: Higdáa G̱ándlaay) is a first-class city in the Prince of Wales-Hyder Census Area, in the U.S. state of Alaska. As of the 2020 census, Hydaburg had a population of 380.

The name "Hydaburg" refers to the Haida people, and Hydaburg is the headquartered of the Hydaburg Cooperative Association, a federally recognized Alaska Native tribe.

== Geography ==
Hydaburg is located at 55°12′17″N 132°49′15″W (55.204699, -132.820859). It is the southernmost city on Prince of Wales Island. Hydaburg is located on the north shore of Sukkwan Strait, which connects to Cordova Bay through Hetta Inlet. It has the only port facility and public road access on Cordova Bay.

According to the United States Census Bureau, the city has a total area of 0.3 square miles (0.78 km^{2}), all land.

== History ==
Hydaburg was formed in 1911 by consolidation of the three Haida villages on Cordova Bay. These villages were Howkan on the west coast of Long Island, Sukkwan at the northern end of Sukkwan Island, across Sukkwan Strait from Hydaburg, and Klinkwan on Prince of Wales Island at the mouth of Hunter Bay. The location was chosen because it had a reliable water supply. The town was incorporated in 1927. The Hydaburg Cooperative Association was established in 1938 shortly after the Indian Reorganization Act was extended to Alaska in 1936, supplanting the municipal government. It was the first IRA-recognized Village Council in Alaska. Residents petitioned to be granted an Indian Reservation as a way of securing their rights to the surrounding land. The area had previously been designated as the Hydaburg Indian Reservation from 1912 to 1926 but had been returned to the Tongass National Forest at community request in 1926. The Hydaburg Indian Reservation was established under the Indian Reorganization Act in 1949 but was invalidated by a US District Court decision in 1952.

Hydaburg was designated as a second-class City in the late 1960s and became a first-class city in 1973. The Hydaburg Cooperative Association remains as the federally recognized tribe, while the Haida Corporation is the village corporation under the Alaska Native Claims Settlement Act.

== Demographics ==
Historical population
Census	Pop.	Note	%±
1920	346		—
1930	319		−7.8%
1940	348		9.1%
1950	353		1.4%
1960	251		−28.9%
1970	214		−14.7%
1980	298		39.3%
1990	384		28.9%
2000	382		−0.5%
2010	376		−1.6%
2020	380		1.1%
U.S. Decennial Census

Hydaburg first appeared on the 1920 U.S. Census as an unincorporated village. It formally incorporated in 1927.

=== 2020 census ===
As of the 2020 census, Hydaburg had a population of 380. The median age was 36.2 years. 28.2% of residents were under the age of 18 and 16.8% of residents were 65 years of age or older. For every 100 females there were 130.3 males, and for every 100 females age 18 and over there were 127.5 males age 18 and over.

0.0% of residents lived in urban areas, while 100.0% lived in rural areas.

There were 138 households in Hydaburg, of which 40.6% had children under the age of 18 living in them. Of all households, 33.3% were married-couple households, 29.0% were households with a male householder and no spouse or partner present, and 26.1% were households with a female householder and no spouse or partner present. About 26.8% of all households were made up of individuals and 10.8% had someone living alone who was 65 years of age or older.

There were 145 housing units, of which 4.8% were vacant. The homeowner vacancy rate was 0.0% and the rental vacancy rate was 7.7%.

Racial composition as of the 2020 census
Race	Number	Percent
White	27	7.1%
Black or African American	2	0.5%
American Indian and Alaska Native	318	83.7%
Asian	1	0.3%
Native Hawaiian and Other Pacific Islander	12	3.2%
Some other race	1	0.3%
Two or more races	19	5.0%
Hispanic or Latino (of any race)	13	3.4%

=== 2000 census ===
As of the census of 2000, there were 382 people, 133 households, and 88 families residing in the city. The population density was 1,340.5 inhabitants per square mile (517.6/km^{2}). There were 154 housing units at an average density of 540.4 per square mile (208.6/km^{2}). The racial makeup of the city was 85.08% Native American, 9.42% White, 0.52% Black or African American, 0.52% Asian, and 4.45% from two or more races.

There were 133 households, out of which 39.1% had children under the age of 18 living with them, 41.4% were married couples living together, 15.8% had a female householder with no husband present, and 33.8% were non-families. 30.8% of all households were made up of individuals, and 7.5% had someone living alone who was 65 years of age or older. The average household size was 2.87 and the average family size was 3.60.

In the city the population was spread out, with 35.10% under the age of 18, 7.3% from 18 to 24, 24.9% from 25 to 44, 24.9% from 45 to 64, and 7.9% who were 65 years of age or older. The median age was 32 years. For every 100 females, there were 112.2 males. For every 100 females age 18 and over, there were 127.5 males.

The median income for a household in the city was $31,625, and the median income for a family was $31,250. Males had a median income of $27,500 versus $41,250 for females. The per capita income for the city was $11,401. About 21.4% of families and 24.1% of the population were below the poverty line, including 29.7% of those under age 18 and 6.1% of those age 65 or over.

== See also ==
- Hydaburg Totem Park
