= Metlakatla, British Columbia =

- Location of in British Columbia
- Coordinates: 54°20′09″N 130°26′36″W
- Country: Canada
- Province: British Columbia
- Time zone: UTC−07:00 (PT)
- Area codes: 250, 778

Metlakatla, British Columbia (Tsimshian: Maxłaxaała) is a small community that is one of the seven Tsimshian village communities in British Columbia, Canada. It is situated at Metlakatla Pass near Prince Rupert, British Columbia. It is the one Tsimshian village in Canada that is not associated with one particular tribe or set of tribes out of the Tsimshian nation's 14 constituent tribes.

== History ==
The name derives from Tsimshian Maaxłakxaała meaning "saltwater pass." Traditionally, this site has been the collective winter village of the "Nine Tribes" of the lower Skeena River, which since 1834 have been mostly based at Lax Kw'alaams, B.C. In 1862, the Anglican lay minister William Duncan established at Metlakatla a utopian Christian community, made up of about 350 Tsimshian from Lax Kw'alaams (a.k.a. Port Simpson) but with members of other Tsimshian tribes as well.

Almost immediately thereafter, the 1862 Pacific Northwest smallpox epidemic tore through Lax Kw'alaams and the North Coast in general. Duncan was able to quarantine Metlakatla by refusing to allow natives to be admitted who showed any signs of smallpox. His efforts resulted in Metlakatla being mostly spared from the disease, which had very high death rates in other places—over half of all indigenous peoples from Puget Sound to the Alexander Archipelago died; over 70% among the Haida people and Heiltsuk, about 67% among the Southern Tsimshian. Duncan used the epidemic to proselytize, saying that the disease had been sent by God as a punishment for the sins of the Tsimshian, and that those who repented and "came to Jesus" and were baptized would be spared.

After the epidemic some of Duncan's followers, including his key convert, Paul Legaic, the most powerful Tsimshian chief, continued to divide their time between Lax Kw'alaams and Metlakatla and continued to divide their allegiances between Christianity and the traditional culture. Other missionaries who served in Metlakatla have included Robert Tomlinson (briefly), as well as William Henry Collison, author of the North Coast missionary memoir In the Wake of the War Canoe.

By 1879 the population had grown to about 1,100.

Duncan's own style, in the image of which the new community was shaped, was a dissident, evangelical form of low-church Anglicanism that omitted the sacrament of communion. This, and his independent temperament, led to Duncan's expulsion from the Church of England's Church Missionary Society in 1881 and the creation of his own nondenominational "Independent Native Church." Eventually, in 1887, he took with him 800-some Metlakatla Tsimshians in an epic canoe journey to found the new community of "New" Metlakatla, Alaska.

After Duncan's departure, the 100 or so remaining residents of "Old Metlakatla," as it was now sometimes known, were left in the hands of William Ridley, Duncan's nemesis and the Anglican bishop of the newly formed Diocese of Caledonia.

In July 1901, a fire destroyed St. Paul's Church at Metlakatla, demolishing what was said to have been the largest church north of San Francisco and west of Chicago, built by Duncan in 1874. Some sources indicate that the fire was started by a band of Alaska Tsimshians under Duncan's orders, including Peter Simpson, later the prominent Alaska Native rights activist. This tragic fire led to Ridley's departure for England in 1905.

A second St. Paul's Church was built in 1903 and was burned 11 years later.

In 1972, Metlakatla Pass was designated a National Historic Site of Canada.

Since then, Metlakatla, B.C. has remained among the smallest of the Tsimshian communities. In 1983 its population was 117, and quite dependent on the nearby city of Prince Rupert. It is still predominantly Anglican.

In November 2016, a study published in Nature Communications linked the genome of 25 Indigenous people who inhabited modern-day Prince Rupert, British Columbia 1000 to 6000 years ago with their descendants in the Metlakatla First Nation. The study validated the oral history of the Metlakatla, which had maintained their presence in the region for thousands of years.

== William Duncan's Rules at Metlakatla ==
1. To give up their Allied or Indian devilry
2. To cease calling in conjurers when sick
3. To cease gambling
4. To cease giving away their property for display (i.e. the potlatch)
5. To cease painting their faces
6. To cease drinking intoxicating liquor
7. To rest on the Sabbath
8. To attend religious instruction
9. To send their children to school
10. To be cleanly
11. To be industrious
12. To be peaceful
13. To be liberal and honest in trade
14. To build neat houses
15. To pay the village tax

== Prominent Metlakatlans ==
- Benjamin A. Haldane, photographer
- Paul Legaic, hereditary chief
- Rev. Edward Marsden, missionary
- Odille Morison, linguist and artifact collector
- Peter Simpson, Native rights activist

== Bibliography ==
- Arctander, John W. (1909) The Apostle of Alaska: The Story of William Duncan of Metlakahtla. New York: Fleming H. Revell Co.
- Bowman, Phyllis (1983) Metlakahtla -- The Holy City! Chilliwack, B.C.: Sunrise Printing.
- Inglis, Gordon B., et al. (1990) "Tsimshians of British Columbia since 1900." In Handbook of North American Indians, Volume 7: Northwest Coast, pp. 285–293. Washington: Smithsonian Institution.
- Johnson, Gertrude Mather (1994) "The Life of Peter Simpson." In Haa Kusteeyí, Our Culture: Tlingit Life Stories, ed. by Nora Marks Dauenhauer and Richard Dauenhauer, pp. 665–676. Seattle: University of Washington Press.
- Murray, Peter (1985) The Devil and Mr. Duncan. Victoria, B.C.: Sono Nis Press.
- Neylan, Susan (2001) The Heavens Are Changing: Nineteenth-Century Protestant Missions and Tsimshian Christianity. Montreal: McGill-Queen's University Press.
- Tomlinson, George, and Judith Young (1993) Challenge the Wilderness: A Family Saga of Robert and Alice Tomlinson, Pioneer Medical Missionaries. Seattle: Northwest Wilderness Books.
- Usher, Jean (1974) William Duncan of Metlakatla: A Victorian Missionary in British Columbia. (National Museums of Canada Publications in History, no. 5.) Ottawa: National Museum of Man.
- Wellcome, Henry S. (1887) The Story of Metlakahtla. London: Saxon.
