= William Duncan (missionary) =

English missionary (1832–1918)

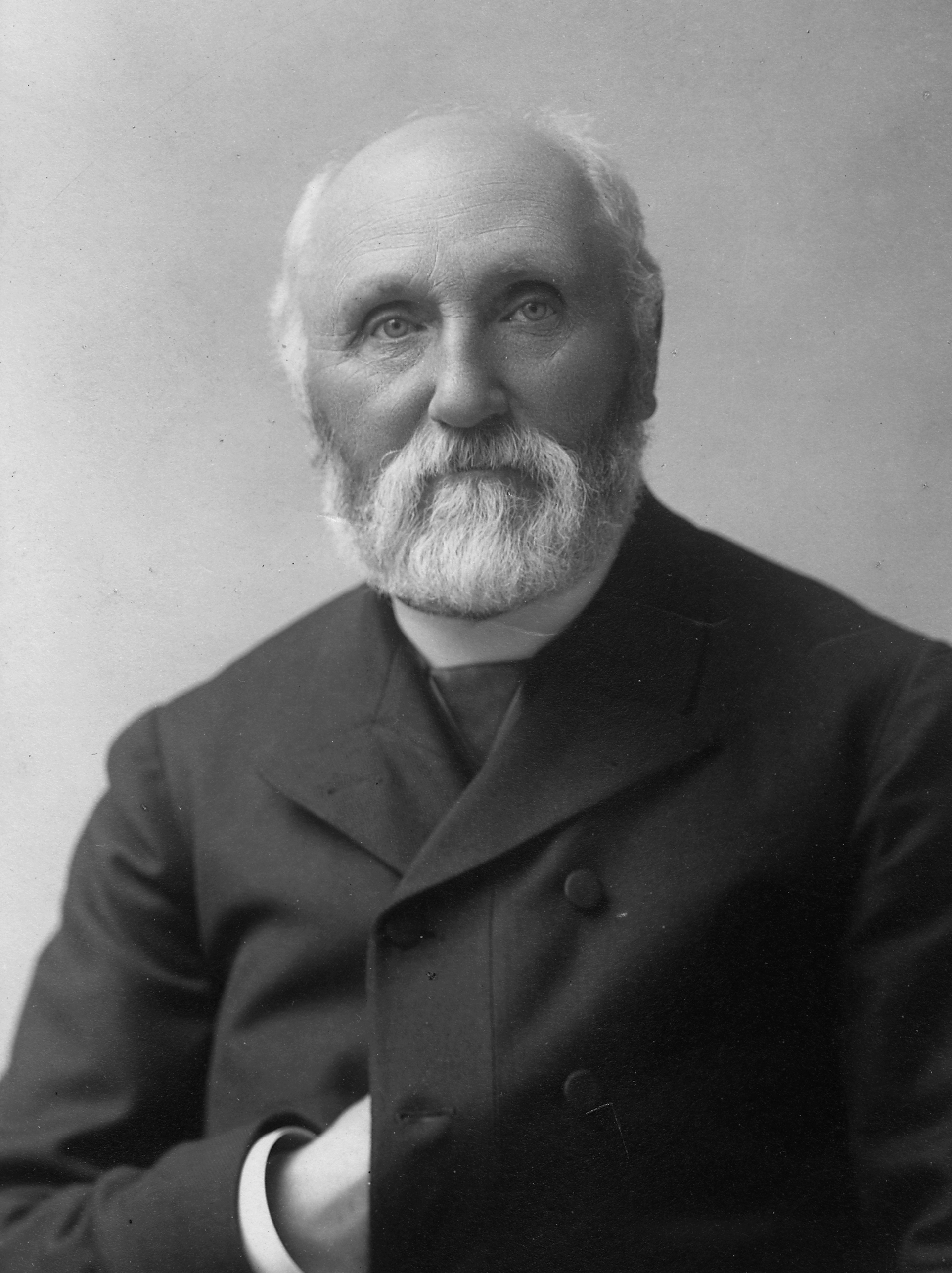
William Duncan c. 1902

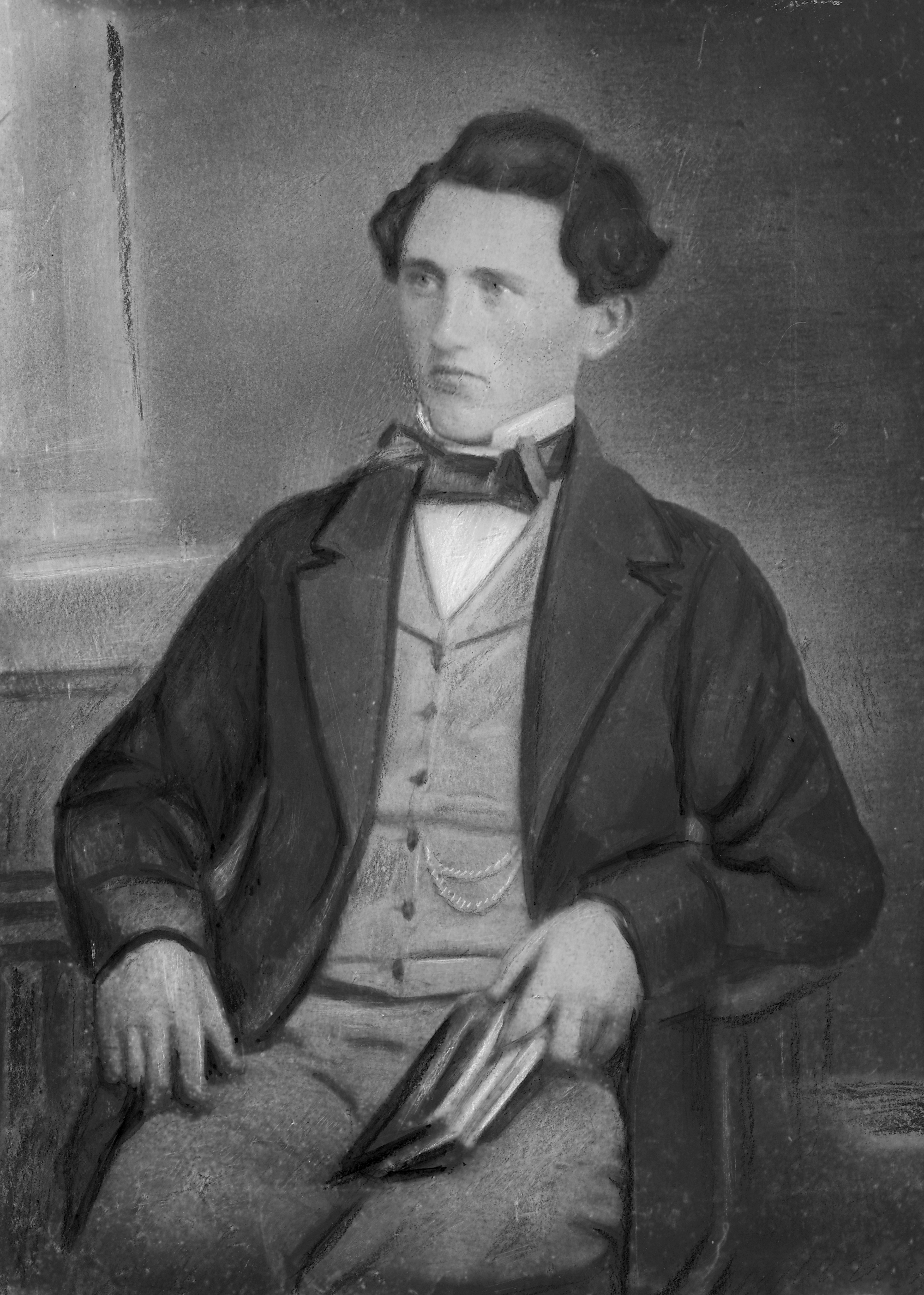
William Duncan age 20

William Duncan (3 April 1832 – 30 August 1918) was an English-born Anglican missionary who founded the Tsimshian communities of Metlakatla, British Columbia, in Canada, and Metlakatla, Alaska, in the United States. Although sometimes referred to as "Father Duncan" in subsequent reports, he was never ordained.

== Early years ==
Duncan was born in the hamlet of Bishop Burton, Yorkshire, England, the illegitimate son of Maria Duncan, a teenaged servant; he was raised by his mother's parents, William and Elizabeth Duncan. In the 1841 census he is recorded as living with his father and his sister Mary Duncan on Lairgate in Beverley. In 1851, he was lodging with William Botterill, a tailor, and Mary Botterill in Keldgate, Beverley and his occupation is described as book-keeper. Duncan later worked in his grandfather/adoptive father's trade as a tanner. Duncan became the only churchgoer in his impoverished family.

In 1854, he joined the Church Missionary Society (CMS) and attended the Church Missionary Society College, Islington.

== Arrival in Canada ==
In 1856 the CMS sent Duncan to the North Pacific coast of Canada, and in 1857 he arrived at the remote Hudson's Bay Company (HBC) fort settlement at Lax Kw'alaams, British Columbia, then part of HBC's New Caledonia district and known as Fort Simpson or Port Simpson. He proselytized among the Tsimshians and learned to speak Tsimshian from Arthur Wellington Clah, a Tsimshian lineage head and HBC employee; he later translated portions of the Bible into Tsimshian. Clah later saved Duncan's life when the village's leading chief, Paul Legaic, threatened Duncan at gunpoint for ringing church bells on the day of Legaic's daughter's initiation into a secret society. Legaic eventually became a key convert of Duncan's.

== Founding of Metlakatla in British Columbia ==
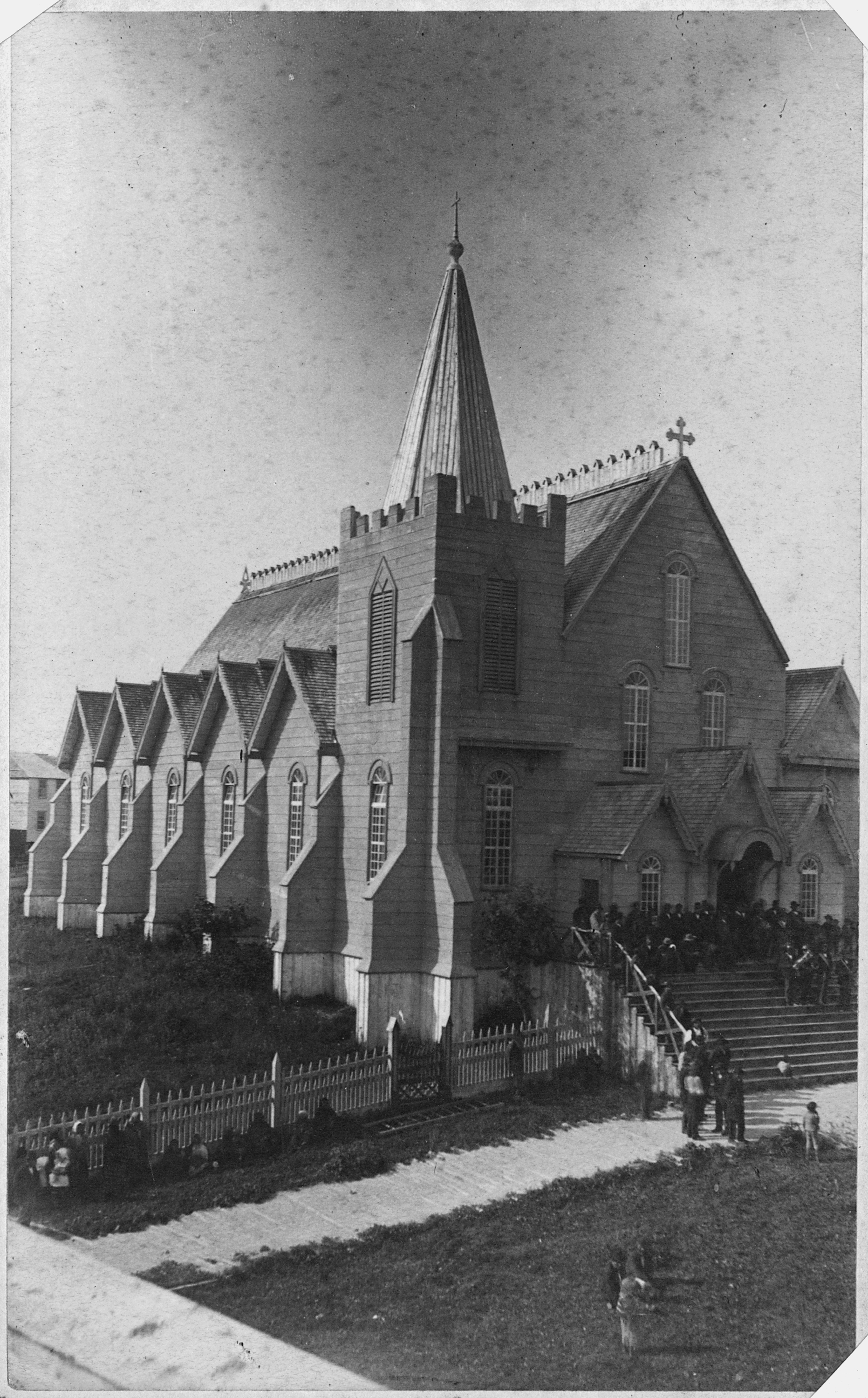
Duncan's church at Metlakatla, B.C.

Duncan led initially 60 Tsimshians to found with him a new utopian Christian community, Metlakatla, on Metlakatla Pass near present-day Prince Rupert, at the southern end of the small peninsula on which Lax Kw'alaams sits. He wanted to protect his 50 Lax Kw'alaams native followers from the heathen influences of the H.B.C. fort atmosphere. By the end of the summer in 1862 several hundred more joined the community; Metlakatla was officially established that year within what was by then the Colony of British Columbia. When the 1862 Pacific Northwest smallpox epidemic killed 500 in Lax Kw'alaams but only five in Metlakatla, Duncan had no qualms in convincing his flock that this was divine providence.

In the early 1870s the Rev. William Henry Collison served with Duncan in Metlakatla, and Collison's memoir In the Wake of the War Canoe provides a portrait of the community.

The community grew. In Metlakatla, Duncan exerted his own brand of low church Anglicanism, which involved a set of rules for Christian living and, controversially, eschewing the sacrament of communion so as not to whet the cannibalistic appetites of a people who he worried might be beholden to the anthropophagous rites of their "secret societies".

=== Duncan's Rules at Metlakatla ===
1. To give up their Ahlied or Indian devilry
2. To cease calling in conjurers when sick
3. To cease gambling
4. To cease giving away their property for display (i.e. the potlatch)
5. To cease painting their faces
6. To cease drinking intoxicating liquor
7. To rest on the Sabbath
8. To attend religious instruction
9. To send their children to school
10. To be cleanly
11. To be industrious
12. To be peaceful
13. To be liberal and honest in trade
14. To build neat houses
15. To pay the village tax

== "New" Metlakatla in Alaska ==
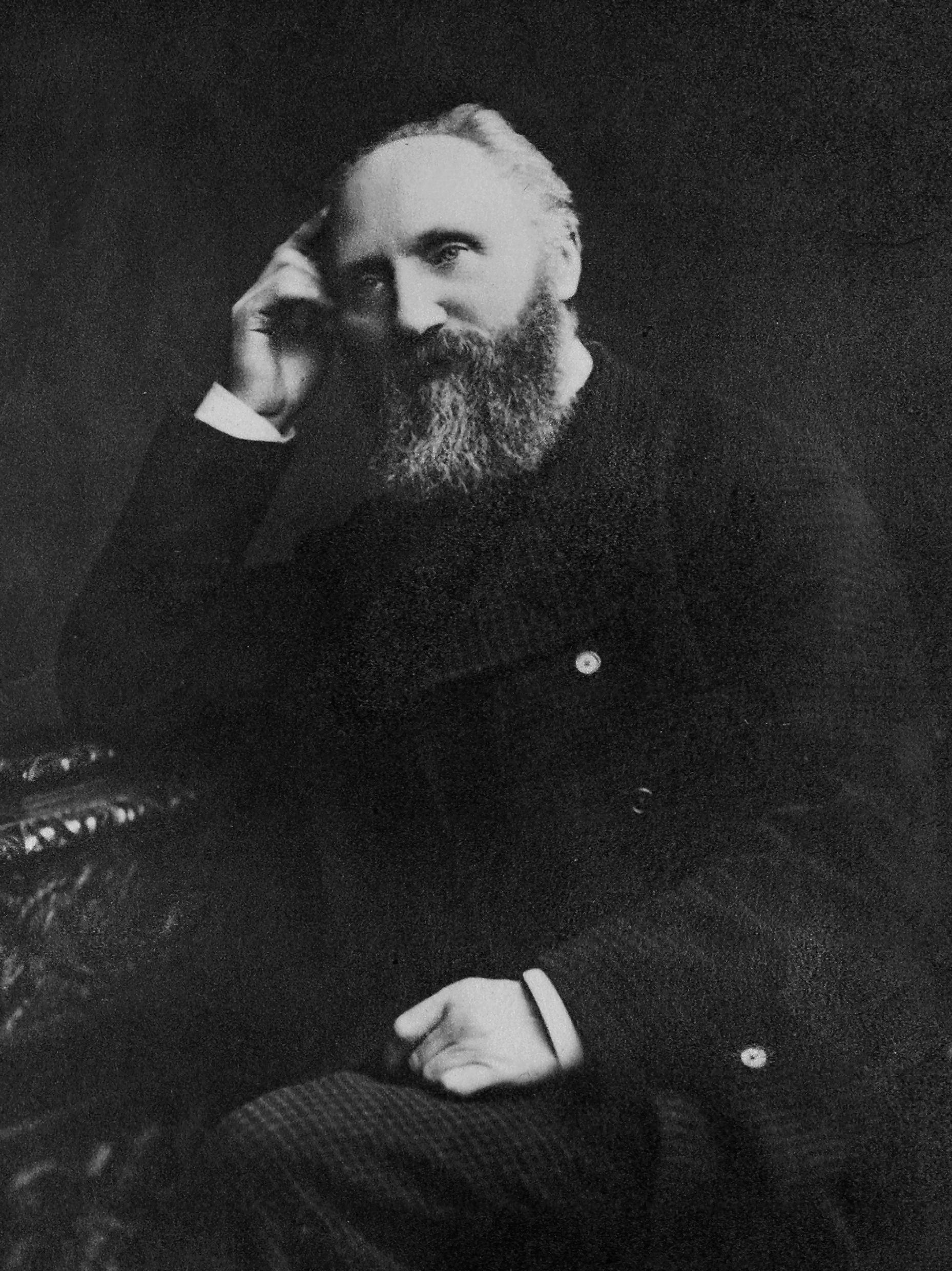
Duncan in 1885

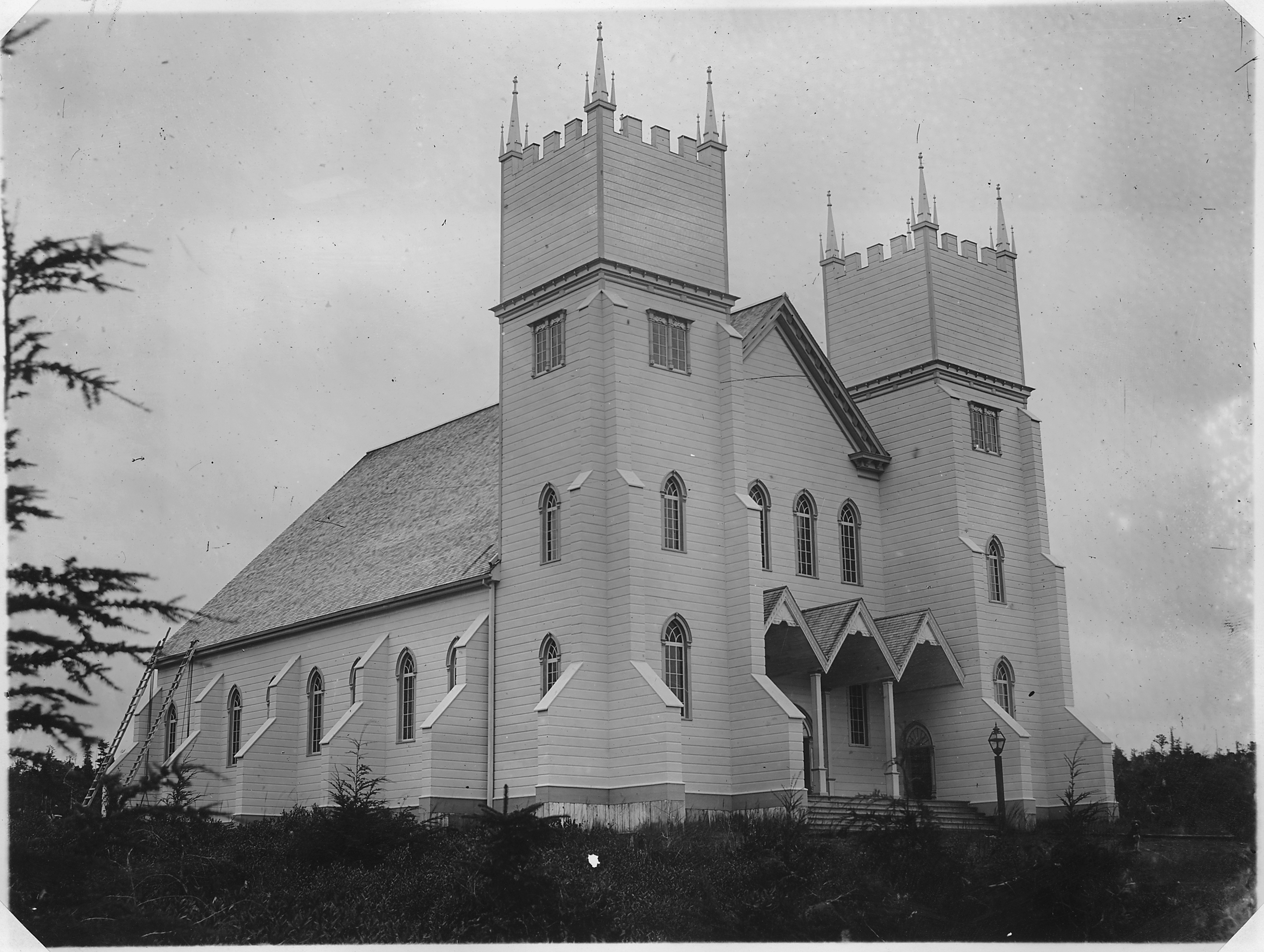
Metlakahtla Christian Mission Church, Alaska, completed 1895, later renamed the William Duncan Memorial Church

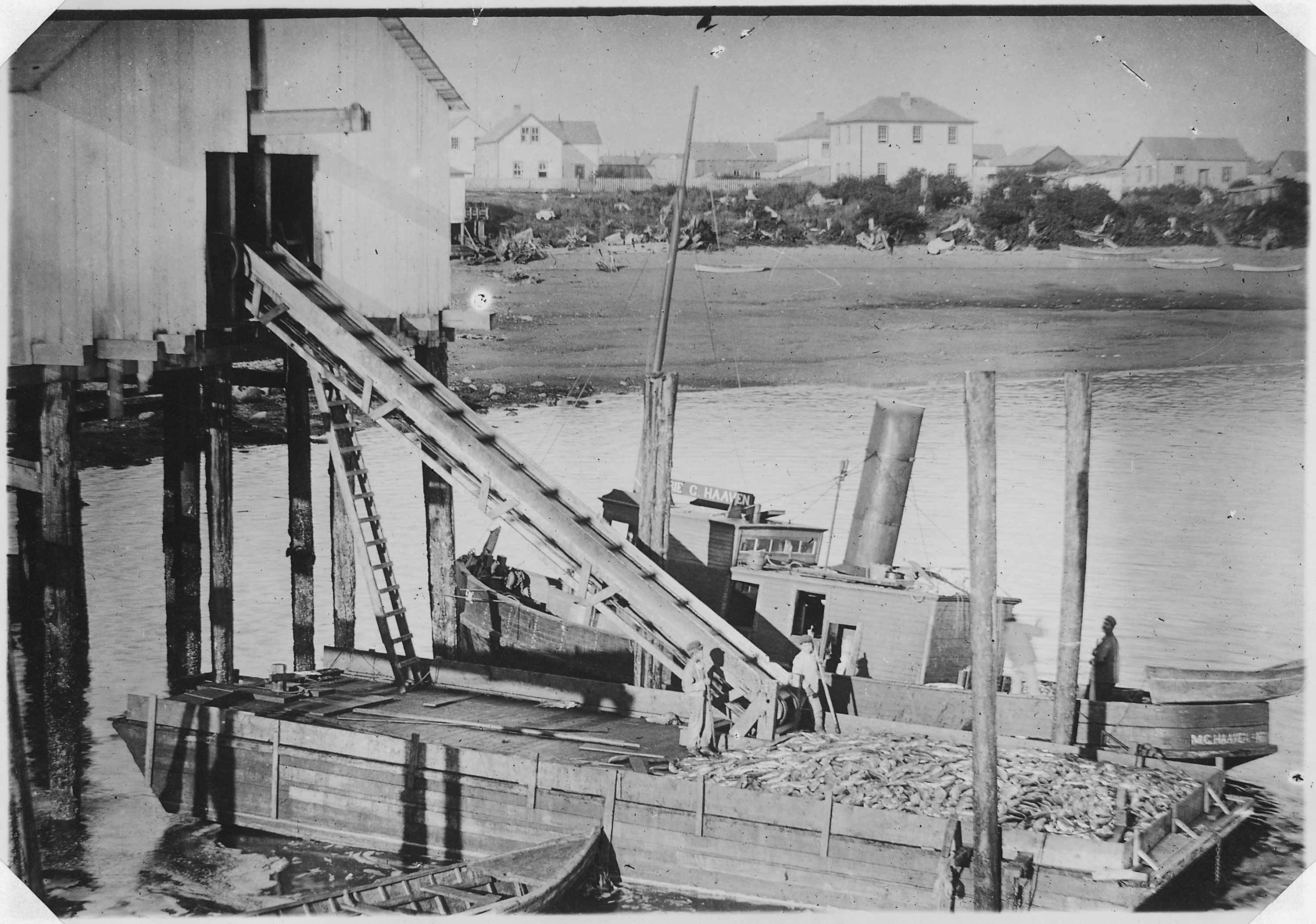
Loading salmon at William Duncan's Cannery, Matlakata, AK

Such doctrinal differences, plus Duncan's insistence on total control over his parishioners' lives, led to a split with the Church of England. Duncan was expelled from the CMS in 1882 and transformed his mission into a nondenominational "Independent Native Church." Eventually, he decided to found a second utopian community on Annette Island, Alaska, on the territory of the Tongass tribe of Tlingit. He obtained permission from the US government - travelling to testify before Congress himself - to establish an Indian reservation there (still Alaska's sole Indian reservation), then led approximately 800 Tsimshians in a canoe voyage from "Old" Metlakatla to "New" Metlakatla, Alaska, in 1887.

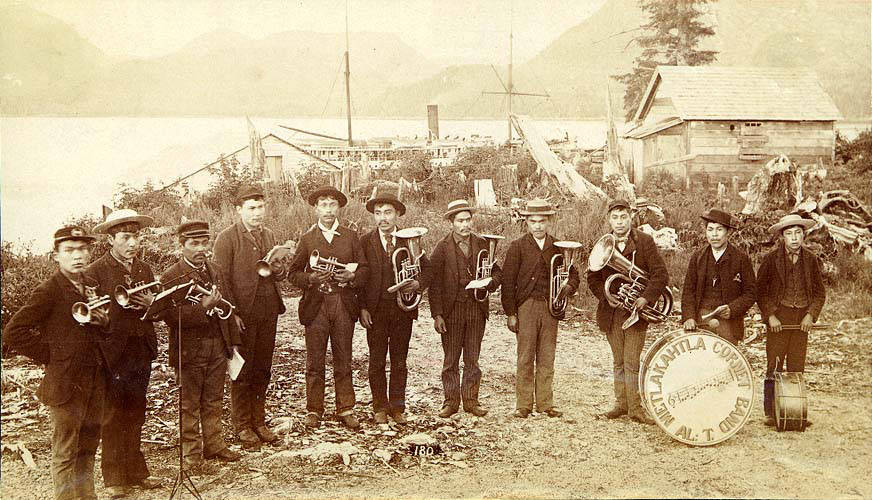
Metlakahtla Cornet Band, Alaska, ca 1897

The new community was successful, especially economically successful, with a sawmill, cannery, and other enterprises. Economic self-sufficiency was a core tenet of Duncan's vision for the community.

His split with the Church of England was not amicable and involved (according to one version of events; see Johnson in bibliography) sending a canoe-load of Tsimshians, including Peter Simpson, who destroyed the church he built at Old Metlakatla, on the grounds that ownership of it should not revert to the CMS. The religious orientation of New Metlakatla became a nondenominational form of low-church Anglicanism, quite evangelical, and under the strict doctrinal control of Duncan himself.

== Rivalries with other local leaders ==
Later, portions of the community, notably those under the leadership of the Rev. Edward Marsden, defected to Presbyterianism, the dominant faith of the surrounding Tlingit communities. Marsden even assisted in the establishment of a rival, Presbyterian Tsimshian community at nearby Port Gravina (1892–1904) and, later, campaigned tirelessly and with some success for the Bureau of Indian Affairs to oust Duncan from his position, partly on grounds that Duncan had too much authority in the community and opposed any Native self-betterment through education and individual economic self-sufficiency if it put parishioners out of his personal control. In 1913, Governor John Strong made a visit to the community to address the concerns of some of the community members; after this the government began administrating community schools. In 1914–1915, the Interior Department seized many of the Mission buildings and built a modern school at Metlakatla.

The Marsden-Duncan feud, as well as the long legal, political, and personal struggle between Duncan and William Ridley, the Anglican bishop in charge of northern British Columbia, intersected, most notoriously, with charges of sexual misconduct against Duncan, charges which have severely tainted his historical reputation, though he was never convicted or punished, and the charge was later concluded to be slander by the Commission of Indian Affairs.

He also managed to make an enemy of the medical missionary Robert Tomlinson, an Anglican who had served under him in B.C. and been an ally in his dissent from the CMS. Tomlinson and his son Robert Tomlinson Jr. served in Metlakatla, Alaska, with Duncan from 1908 to 1912 before leaving for B.C. again out of disenchantment with the way Duncan was running the community.

== Death and legacy ==
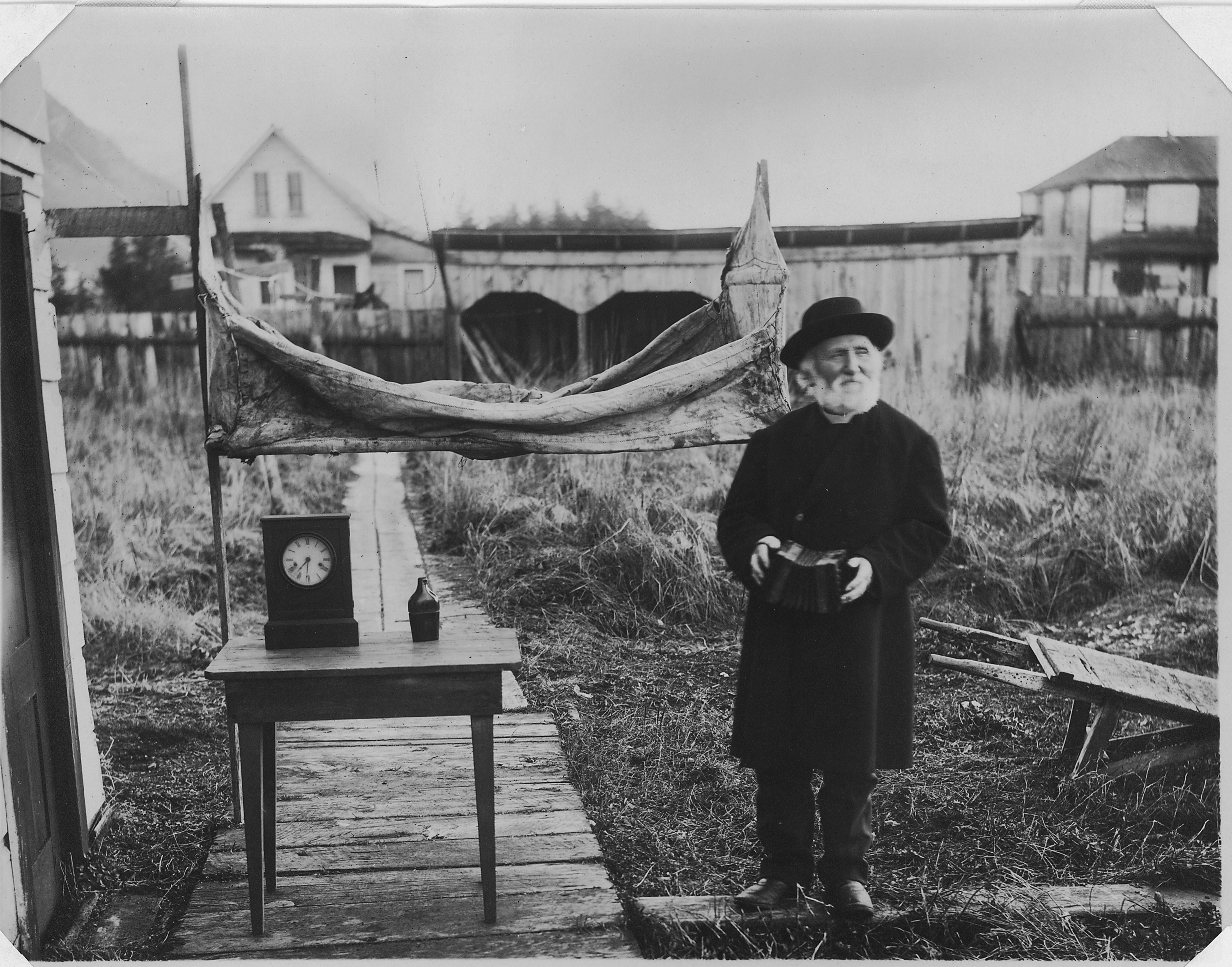
William Duncan late in life, exhibiting to friends for photographing the canvas hammock, clock, water bottle, and accordion used by him on his voyage to Victoria, B.C., in 1856–57. 1916–1917, From the Wellcome Foundation collection at the National Archives and Records Administration.

Duncan died at the age of 86 on 30 August 1918, in "New" Metlakatla, Alaska after a months-long decline associated with a bronchial infection apparently resulting from a fall.

By 2018, the Metlakatla Indian Community was the only Native reservation land Alaska, with the Tshimpshians controlling the natural resources. Duncan’s cottage became a museum which was open to the public.

Duncan remains a controversial figure in Tsimshian communities today, with many admirers and detractors.
