= Metlakatla, Alaska =

Metlakatla, Alaska Maxłakxaała
- CDP
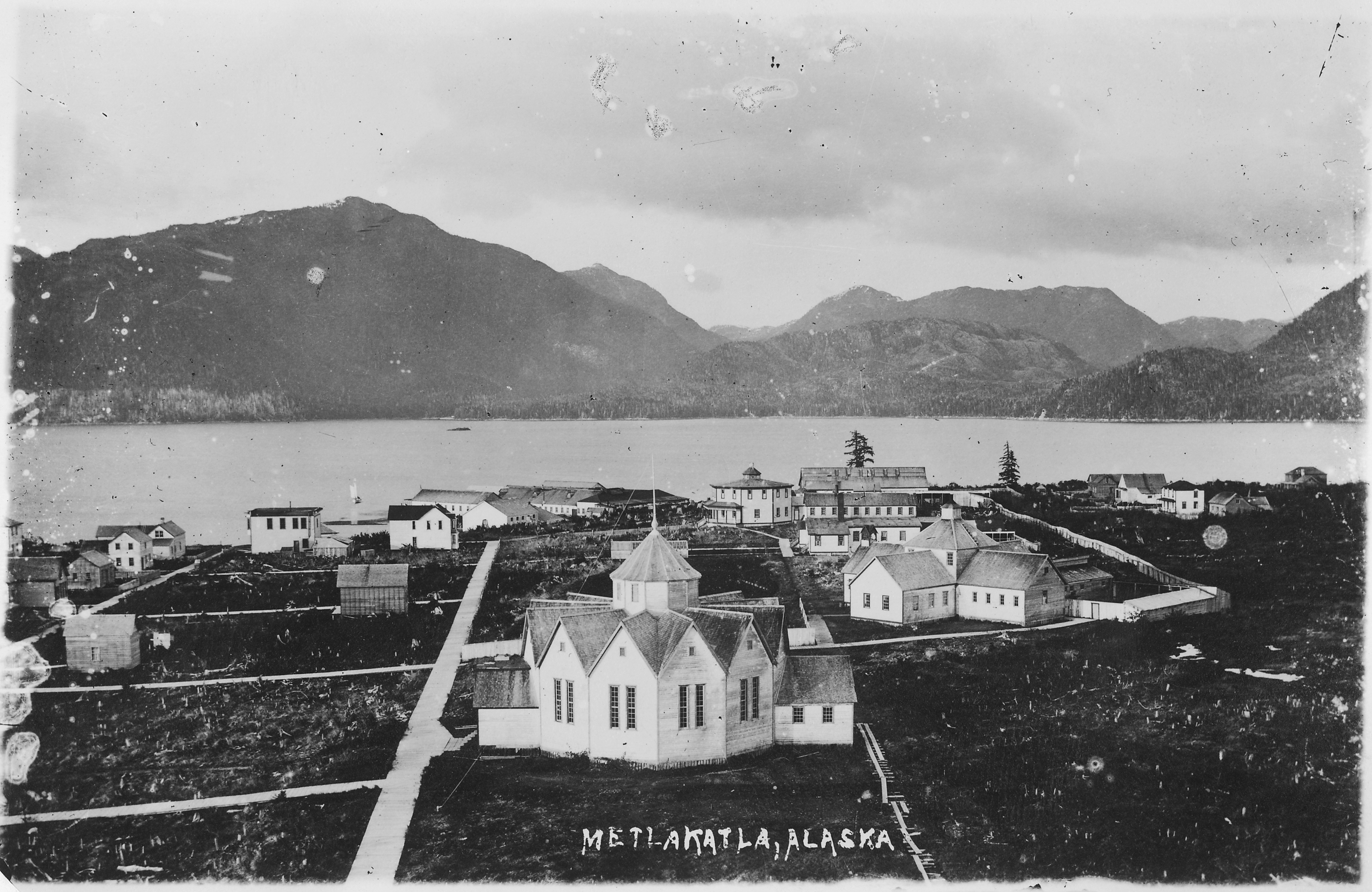
- View of Metlakahtla, Alaska in 1889

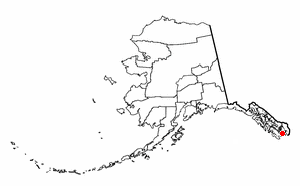
- Location of Metlakatla, Alaska
- Coordinates: 55°7′37″N 131°34′35″W
- Country: United States
- State: Alaska
- Borough: Unorganized
- Census Area: Prince of Wales-Hyder

Government
  - State senator: Bert Stedman (R)
  - State rep.: Dan Ortiz (I)

Area
  - Total: 2.32 sq mi (6.02 km^{2})
  - Land: 2.31 sq mi (5.97 km^{2})
  - Water: 0.019 sq mi (0.05 km^{2})
- Elevation: 3.3 ft (1 m)

Population (2020)
  - Total: 1,454
  - Density: 630.6/sq mi (243.49/km^{2})
- Time zone: UTC−9 (AKST)
  - Summer (DST): UTC−8 (AKDT)
- ZIP code: 99926
- Area code: 907
- FIPS code: 02-48870
- GNIS feature ID: 1423661

Metlakatla (/ˌmɛtləˈkætlə/; Tsimshian: Maxłaxaała or Tak'waan; Tlingit: Tàakw.àani) is a census-designated place (CDP) on Annette Island in Prince of Wales-Hyder Census Area, Alaska, United States. At the 2010 census the population was 1,405; this had grown to 1,454 by the 2020 census.

Since the late 19th century, it has been the major settlement of the Metlakatla Indian Community of the federally recognized Annette Island Reserve, the only remaining reserve in Alaska. The Metlakatla voted to opt out of the Alaska Native Claims Settlement Act of the 1970s and retained rights to their land and waters. Membership in the community is primarily by lineage; it consists primarily of Tsimshian people and also includes those from other Alaska Native tribes who wish to join the Metlakatla Indian Community as a bona fide citizen. Citizenship is granted upon approval of the Metlakatla Tribal Council and Executives.

== History ==
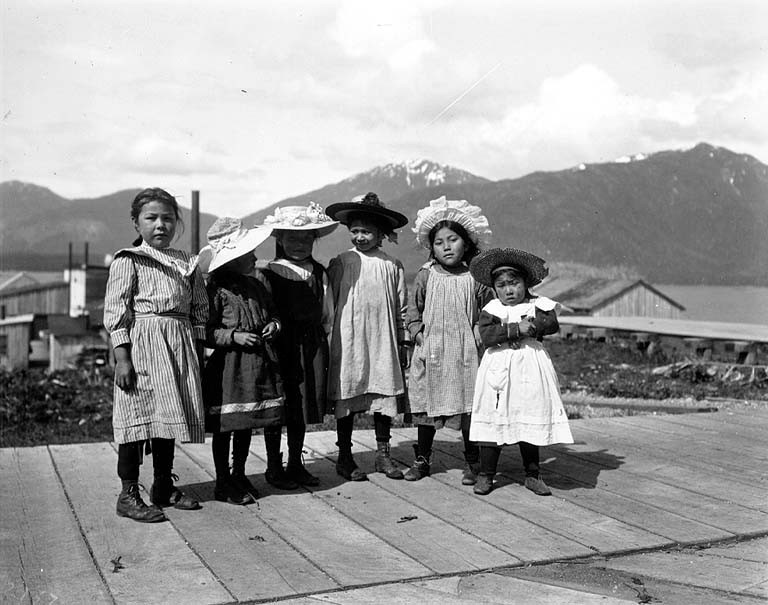
Tsimshian children in Metlakatla, 1904

Metlakatla comes from Maxłaxaała, a Tsimshian word meaning "saltwater passage where the wind dies down." Metlakatla was named after another village of the same name ("Old Metlakatla") in British Columbia, which is on Metlakatla Pass, near Prince Rupert. In a more ancient time, it was a Tlingit hunting ground known as Taquan, or Tàakw.àani. The Tsimshian were granted permission to occupy the land by Chief Johnson of the Tlingit tribe.

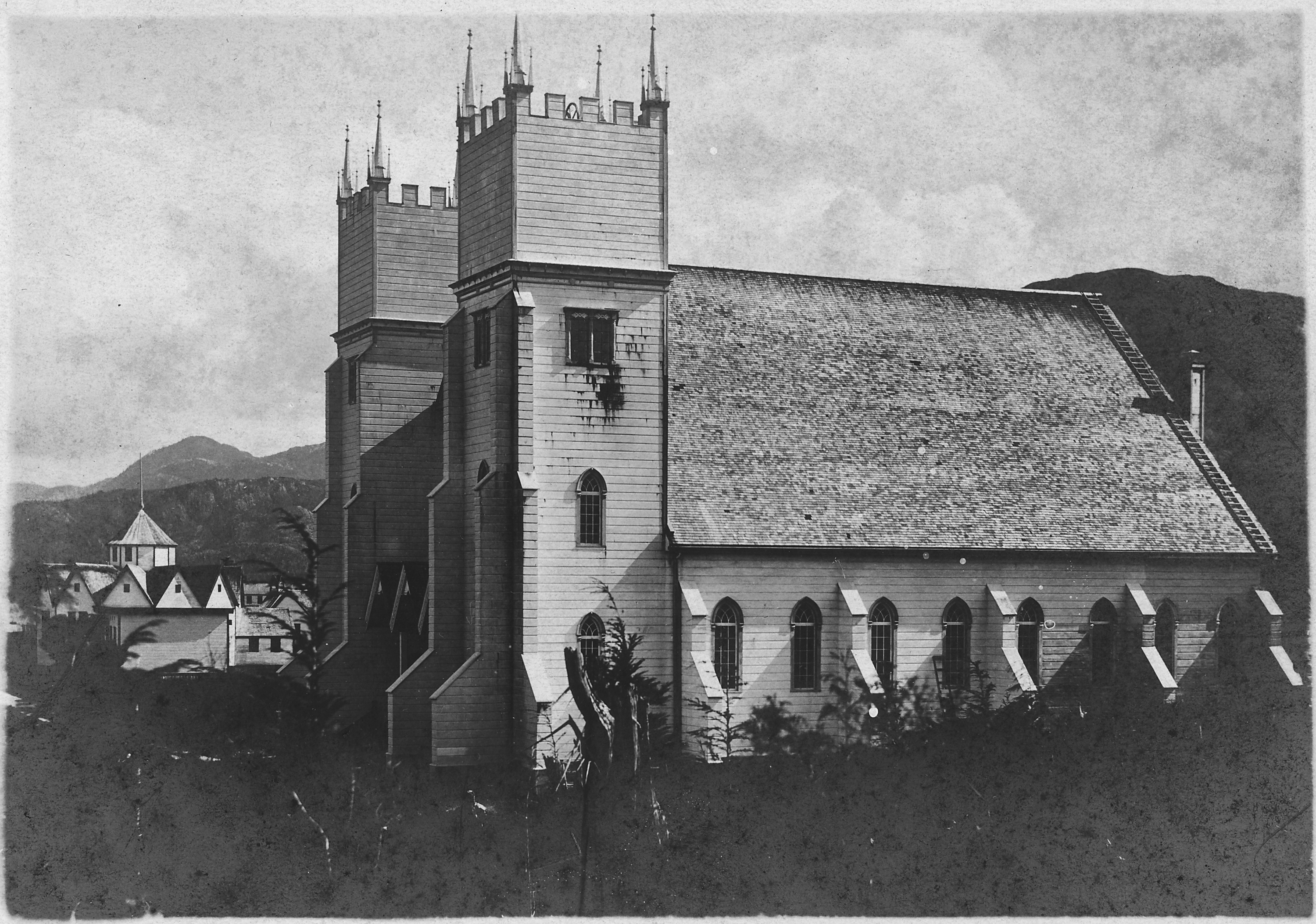
Metlakahtla Christian Mission Church, early 20th century. Founded by the Scottish missionary Father William Duncan

In 1886, William Duncan, an English tannery employee and lay member of the Church Missionary Society, had a doctrinal dispute with the Church authorities in Metlakatla, B.C. He and a devoted group of Tsimshian followers decided to leave Metlakatla. Duncan went to Washington, D.C., in the United States and asked the U.S. government to give his group land in Alaska. The U.S. under President Cleveland gave them Annette Island after a Tsimshian search committee in seagoing canoes discovered its calm bay, accessible beaches, nearby waterfall, and abundant fish.

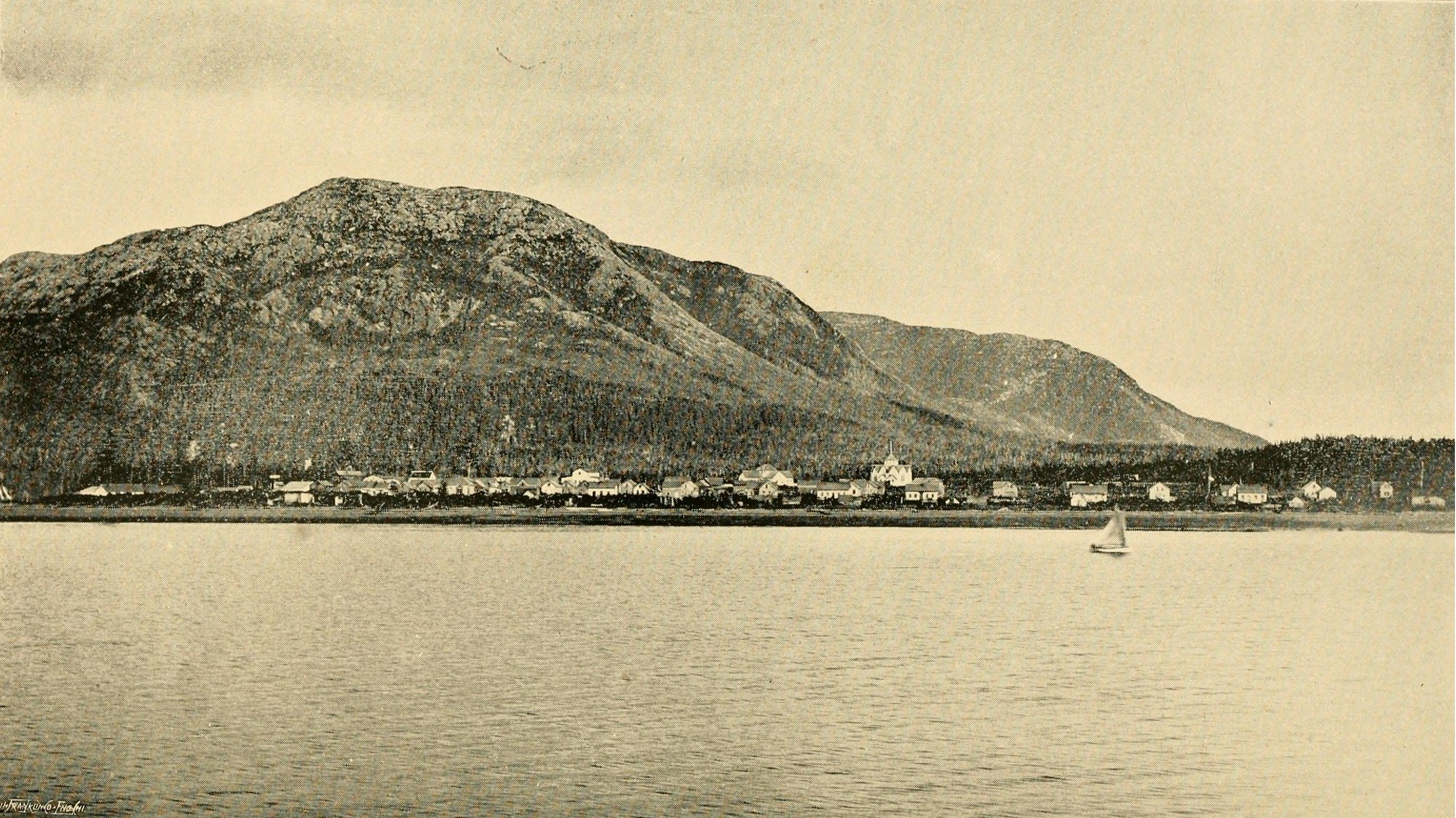
Metlakatla, 1890s

In 1887, the group arrived on the island and built a settlement in the Port Chester area. They laid out the town in a European-style grid pattern. It contained a church, a school, a cannery, and a sawmill. They named the town New Metlakatla, after the town they had left behind, but later dropped the "New." In 1888, William Duncan returned to Washington and lobbied the U.S. Congress for an Indian reserve on Annette Island. Although the reservation system had not been used in Alaska, Congress granted his request in 1891. Duncan remained at Metlakatla until his death in 1918.

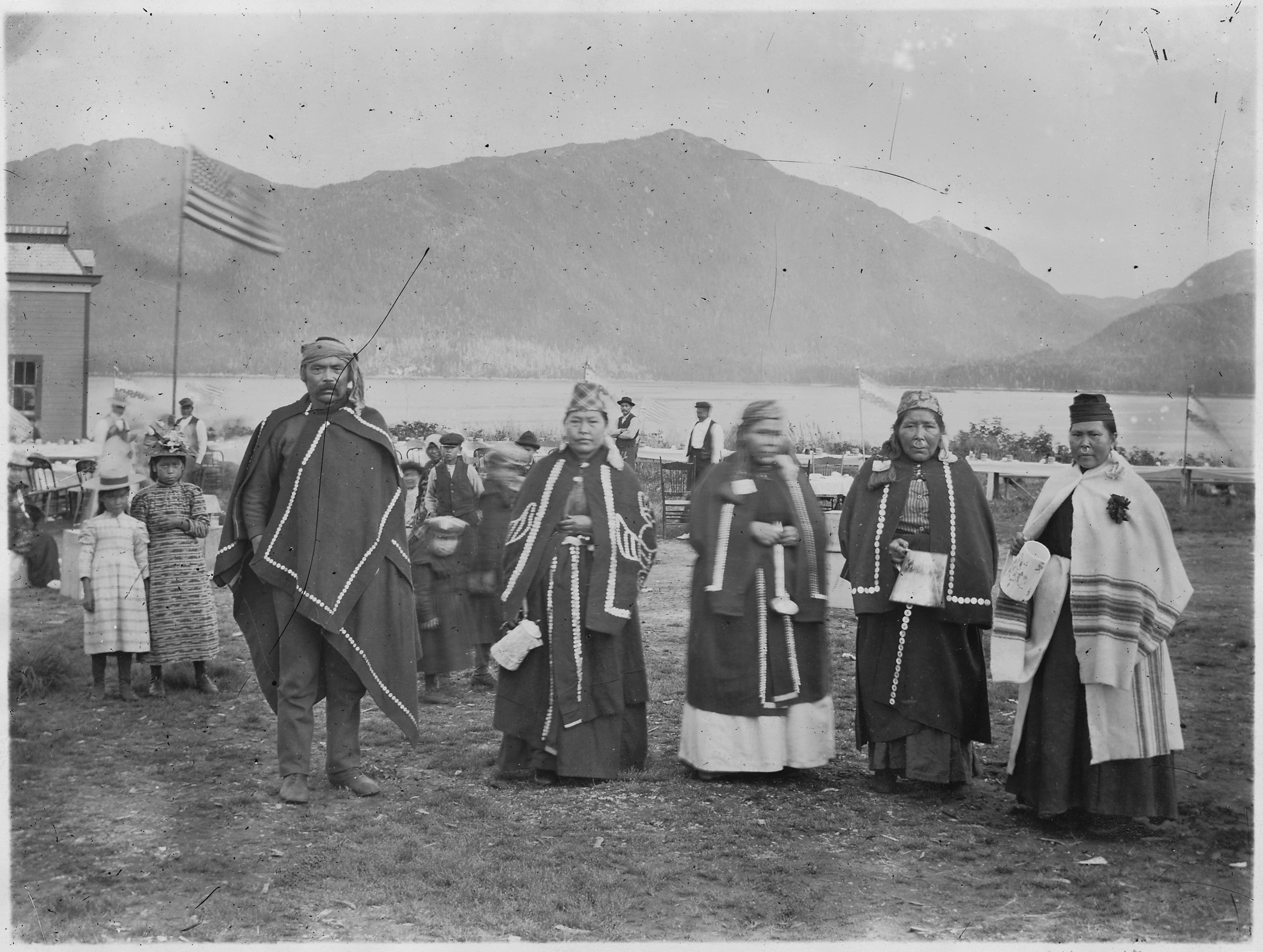
A group of Tsimshian at a Metlakatla wedding, c. 1900

During World War II, the United States made a treaty with the Metlakatla Indian Community to permit construction and operation of a military airbase on Annette Island. In exchange, the US promised to build a road connecting the ocean-side city to Alaska's Inside Passage (in order to allow year-round ferry service to Ketchikan). The airfield on Annette Island was garrisoned by Canadians during the war. This airfield became "the first Canadian force ever based in U.S. territory to directly assist in American defense."

After the war, the property was adapted as a United States Coast Guard search and rescue base. This airfield served the area commercially until the 1970s, when the new Ketchikan Airport was built at Gravina Island in the Inside Passage.

Annette Islands Reserve, including surrounding islands, today is the only Indian Reserve in Alaska. In the 1970s, the Metlakatla did not accept the Alaska Native Claims Settlement Act and thus kept the Reserve Status, and maintained sovereign immunity. "Annette Islands Reserve consists of 132,000 acres of land and water base. Metlakatla Indian Community has exclusive commercial and subsistence fishing rights to the islands’ waterways extending from 3,000 feet at mean low tide."

Travelers into Metlakatla usually reach it via the Alaska Marine Highway ferry. They can also travel to Ketchikan on Revillagigedo Island and cross the Revillagigedo Channel to Annette Island by boat or seaplane.

More than 50 years after the end of WWII, in 1997 the US Federal Government began construction of the cross-island road promised to Metlakatla under its wartime M.O.A. treaty. From 1997 to 2007, a joint task force under the overall command of Alaska Command, and led by the Missouri Army National Guard, worked at constructing a 15-mile road from one side of Annette Island to the other. Members of the Active and Reserve components of the Army, Navy, United States Air Force, and the Marines deployed to the island on 2- to 3-week rotations to build the road.

== Geography and climate ==
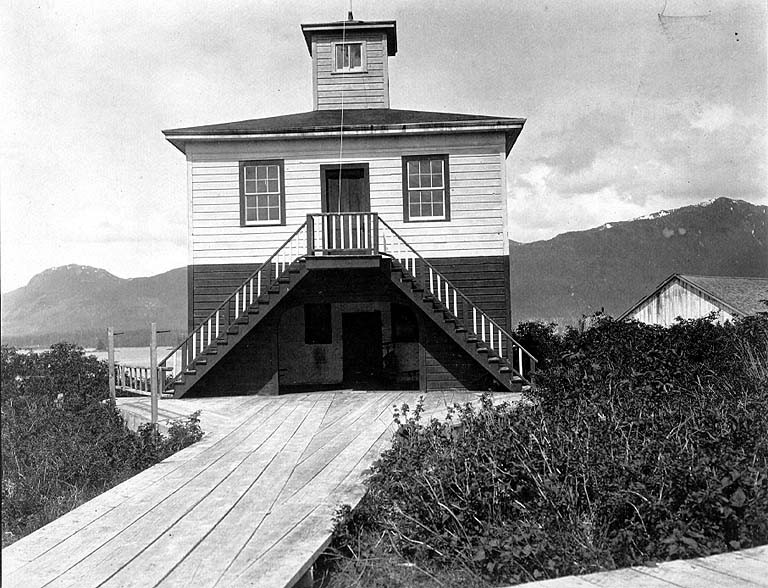
Jail and Fire Department, early 20th century

Metlakatla is located at 55°7′37″N 131°34′35″W (55.126916, −131.576393). It is within the Port Chester Bay, on Annette Island, about 25 km (16 mi) south of Ketchikan.

According to the United States Census Bureau, the CDP has a total area of 2.3 square miles (6.0 km^{2}), of which, 2.3 square miles (6.0 km^{2}) of it is land and 0.04 square miles (0.10 km^{2}) of it (0.85%) is water.

Metlakatla has a Marine west coast climate (Köppen Cfb), with windy and wet weather year-round, cool winters, and mild summers, and straddles the border between USDA Plant Hardiness Zones 7 and 8. Due to its southerly and maritime location, with an annual mean temperature of 47.7 °F (8.7 °C), the town is one of the warmest locations statewide. Most days during the winter see precipitation fall, and the seasonal total snowfall of 34.8 inches (88 cm) occurs mostly from November to March, with some accumulation during April; warm spells raise the high to 50 °F (10 °C) for several days each month. During summer, there is an average of 23 days with 70 °F (21 °C)+ highs, and rain still falls on around half of the days. Precipitation averages more than 101 inches (2.57 m) annually, with June and July being the driest months and October and November the wettest. Extreme temperatures have ranged from −4 °F (−20 °C) on January 30, 1947, up to 93 °F (34 °C) on June 19, 2004, with the temperature having fallen below 0 °F (−18 °C) only on a handful of occasions. In addition, the Annette Island Airport holds the Alaska state monthly record high temperatures for April (82 °F or 28 °C on April 29, 1976) and November (67 °F or 19 °C on November 1, 1970).

Climate data for Annette Island Airport, Alaska, 1991–2020 normals, extremes 1941–2019
Month	Jan	Feb	Mar	Apr	May	Jun	Jul	Aug	Sep	Oct	Nov	Dec	Year
Record high °F (°C)	66 (19)	65 (18)	65 (18)	82 (28)	88 (31)	93 (34)	90 (32)	90 (32)	82 (28)	71 (22)	67 (19)	62 (17)	93 (34)
Mean maximum °F (°C)	51.6 (10.9)	51.9 (11.1)	53.5 (11.9)	64.0 (17.8)	71.2 (21.8)	77.5 (25.3)	77.8 (25.4)	78.3 (25.7)	69.2 (20.7)	60.2 (15.7)	53.3 (11.8)	50.7 (10.4)	82.0 (27.8)
Mean daily maximum °F (°C)	42.9 (6.1)	44.1 (6.7)	46.0 (7.8)	51.8 (11.0)	58.6 (14.8)	62.9 (17.2)	65.9 (18.8)	66.3 (19.1)	61.1 (16.2)	53.6 (12.0)	46.8 (8.2)	43.1 (6.2)	53.6 (12.0)
Daily mean °F (°C)	37.7 (3.2)	38.3 (3.5)	40.1 (4.5)	45.4 (7.4)	51.7 (10.9)	56.4 (13.6)	59.7 (15.4)	60.0 (15.6)	55.1 (12.8)	47.9 (8.8)	41.7 (5.4)	38.3 (3.5)	47.7 (8.7)
Mean daily minimum °F (°C)	32.5 (0.3)	32.6 (0.3)	34.1 (1.2)	38.9 (3.8)	44.8 (7.1)	49.9 (9.9)	53.5 (11.9)	53.8 (12.1)	49.1 (9.5)	42.3 (5.7)	36.5 (2.5)	33.5 (0.8)	41.8 (5.4)
Mean minimum °F (°C)	16.8 (−8.4)	19.9 (−6.7)	24.1 (−4.4)	30.7 (−0.7)	36.3 (2.4)	43.2 (6.2)	47.7 (8.7)	46.9 (8.3)	39.3 (4.1)	30.8 (−0.7)	23.2 (−4.9)	18.4 (−7.6)	10.0 (−12.2)
Record low °F (°C)	−4 (−20)	2 (−17)	1 (−17)	21 (−6)	30 (−1)	37 (3)	40 (4)	40 (4)	30 (−1)	18 (−8)	−3 (−19)	1 (−17)	−4 (−20)
Average precipitation inches (mm)	10.43 (265)	7.71 (196)	7.88 (200)	7.18 (182)	5.55 (141)	5.09 (129)	5.17 (131)	7.92 (201)	10.16 (258)	12.87 (327)	12.55 (319)	11.00 (279)	103.51 (2,628)
Average snowfall inches (cm)	7.0 (18)	7.3 (19)	7.8 (20)	1.0 (2.5)	0.0 (0.0)	0.0 (0.0)	0.0 (0.0)	0.0 (0.0)	0.0 (0.0)	0.0 (0.0)	3.6 (9.1)	8.1 (21)	34.8 (89.6)
Average precipitation days (≥ 0.01 in)	21.9	17.9	22.0	19.1	15.3	15.5	15.4	15.8	19.5	22.5	23.3	23.2	231.4
Average snowy days (≥ 0.1 in)	4.7	4.2	5.4	1.4	0.1	0.0	0.0	0.0	0.0	0.0	2.9	4.9	23.6
Average relative humidity (%)	77.1	78.1	75.4	75.4	74.9	77.0	78.6	80.8	81.6	81.5	79.1	78.8	78.2
Average dew point °F (°C)	27.0 (−2.8)	30.6 (−0.8)	30.6 (−0.8)	34.3 (1.3)	39.7 (4.3)	45.7 (7.6)	50.2 (10.1)	51.3 (10.7)	47.7 (8.7)	40.8 (4.9)	33.3 (0.7)	29.1 (−1.6)	38.4 (3.5)
Mean monthly sunshine hours	49.6	70.6	105.4	147.0	186.0	162.0	148.8	145.7	108.0	68.2	51.0	34.1	1,276.4
Mean daily sunshine hours	1.6	2.5	3.4	4.9	6.0	5.4	4.8	4.7	3.6	2.2	1.7	1.1	3.5
Source 1: NOAA (humidity and dew point 1961–1990, mean maxima/minima 1981–2010)
Source 2: Deutscher Wetterdienst (sun 1961–1990)

== Demographics ==
Historical population
Census	Pop.	Note	%±
1890	823		—
1900	465		−43.5%
1910	602		29.5%
1920	574		−4.7%
1930	466		−18.8%
1940	674		44.6%
1950	817		21.2%
1960	798		−2.3%
1970	1,050		31.6%
1980	1,056		0.6%
1990	1,407		33.2%
2000	1,375		−2.3%
2010	1,405		2.2%
2020	1,454		3.5%
U.S. Decennial Census

Metlakatla first appeared on the 1890 U.S. Census as the unincorporated (Tsimshian) village of "Metlakahtla." From 1900 to 1930, it returned as Metlakatla. From 1940 to 1960, it was spelled as "Metlakahtla" again. In 1970 and in every census since, it has been spelled as Metlakatla. It was made a census-designated place (CDP) beginning in 1980.

=== 2020 census ===
As of the 2020 census, Metlakatla had a population of 1,454. The median age was 35.9 years. 26.6% of residents were under the age of 18 and 15.3% of residents were 65 years of age or older. For every 100 females there were 121.6 males, and for every 100 females age 18 and over there were 112.5 males age 18 and over.

0.0% of residents lived in urban areas, while 100.0% lived in rural areas.

There were 529 households in Metlakatla, of which 31.8% had children under the age of 18 living in them. Of all households, 40.5% were married-couple households, 24.4% were households with a male householder and no spouse or partner present, and 25.7% were households with a female householder and no spouse or partner present. About 27.0% of all households were made up of individuals and 11.2% had someone living alone who was 65 years of age or older.

There were 586 housing units, of which 9.7% were vacant. The homeowner vacancy rate was 0.0% and the rental vacancy rate was 8.7%.

Racial composition as of the 2020 census
Race	Number	Percent
White	144	9.9%
Black or African American	4	0.3%
American Indian and Alaska Native	1,113	76.5%
Asian	0	0.0%
Native Hawaiian and Other Pacific Islander	4	0.3%
Some other race	2	0.1%
Two or more races	187	12.9%
Hispanic or Latino (of any race)	43	3.0%

=== 2000 census ===
As of the census of 2000, there were 1,375 people, 469 households, and 338 families residing in the CDP. The population density was 593.4 inhabitants per square mile (229.1/km^{2}). There were 531 housing units at an average density of 229.2 per square mile (88.5/km^{2}). The racial makeup of the CDP was 9.53% White, 0.22% Black or African American, 81.82% Native American, 0.07% Asian, 0.51% from other races, and 7.85% from two or more races. 1.82% of the population were Hispanic or Latino of any race.

There were 469 households, out of which 38.8% had children under the age of 18 living with them, 48.0% were married couples living together, 15.6% had a female householder with no husband present, and 27.9% were non-families. 23.5% of all households were made up of individuals, and 6.6% had someone living alone who was 65 years of age or older. The average household size was 2.93 and the average family size was 3.50.

In the CDP, the population was spread out, with 33.1% under the age of 18, 9.4% from 18 to 24, 28.7% from 25 to 44, 21.6% from 45 to 64, and 7.2% who were 65 years of age or older. The median age was 31 years. For every 100 females, there were 108.3 males. For every 100 females age 18 and over, there were 115.0 males.

The median income for a household in the CDP was $43,516, and the median income for a family was $49,671. Males had a median income of $36,696 versus $22,292 for females. The per capita income for the CDP was $16,140. About 7.7% of families and 8.0% of the population were below the poverty line, including 9.7% of those under age 18 and 6.3% of those age 65 or over.

== Education ==
Metlakatla is served by the Annette Island School District.

A free Adult Education and GED program serves the community. It is run through the Southeast Regional Resource Center, which is based out of Juneau.

== See also ==
- Metlakatla Seaplane Base (IATA: MTM, ICAO: PAMM, FAA LID: MTM)
