= Robert Cunningham (entrepreneur) =

Robert Cunningham (1837–1905) was a British-Canadian lay missionary turned entrepreneur who founded the town of Port Essington, British Columbia.

He was born 1 January 1837, in Dungannon, Ireland (one source, Large, says "Tullyvally, Ireland"), to a Protestant (Anglican) family. In 1862, at the age of twenty-five, he sailed to Canada with the Anglican Church Missionary Society to work as a lay assistant to the Anglican lay missionary William Duncan at the Tsimshian community of Metlakatla, B.C.

== Missionary Work ==
Shortly after his arrival at Metlakatla Robert Cunningham was assigned to assist the missionary R. Arthur Doolan, himself newly arrived from England, in founding a new mission among the Nisga'a. Together with a Tsimshian interpreter named Robert Dundas they opened a mission among the villages on the lower Nass River in July 1864. When it soon came to light that Cunningham had fathered a child with a young Tsimshian student of Duncan's named Elizabeth Ryan Doolan married the couple and Cunningham's formal relationship with the Church Missionary Society was terminated.

== Trader ==
Cunningham began working at the Hudson's Bay Company's Fort Simpson, a trading fort later known as Port Simpson and Lax Kw'alaams. He worked alongside Charles F. Morison, who eventually married Elizabeth's niece Odille Quintal (later Morison), the Tsimshian linguist. Cunningham eventually rose to the position of chief trader.

In 1870 he left the HBC and Port Simpson. Versions differ as to the circumstances of this: discontent over his salary or a trumped-up charge of rum-running imposed by Duncan (who was also the local justice of the peace), or both. Cunningham then began an entrepreneurial relationship with one Thomas Hankin (later father to the Tlingit interpreter and teacher Constance Cox. In 1871, with the onset of the Omineca Gold Rush, Cunningham and Hankin became traders at Hazelton, in Gitxsan territory, and eventually founded a depot at Woodcock's Landing downriver at the Skeena River estuary, at what later became the site of Inverness cannery.

In search of a better location, the two staked a claim for a plot of land at a site Tsimshians called Spaksuut (fall camping-place), on the territory of the Gitzaxłaał Tsimshians at the confluence of the Skeena and Ecstall rivers. In 1872 a store was built there, and the site gradually acquired a more or less permanent presence of Kitselas and Kitsumkalum Tsimshians from upriver.

By the 1890s Port Essington, as Spaksuut came to be known, was a small town, and soon it became the largest settlement in the region and its economic hub. Cunningham bought out Hankin and established salmon packing as the community's main industry. The Cunningham Cannery produced "Diamond A" brand canned salmon. Though other canneries operated in the town, Port Essington was largely considered to be "Cunningham's town."

Several members of Cunningham's family in Ireland eventually moved to Port Essington, as did Charles and Odille Morison. In 1888, Cunningham's wife Elizabeth was drowned with several others when their canoe capsized off Port Lambert near Port Essington. Of their five children, only two, George and John, survived early childhood, and John was killed at age seventeen when a trading schooner was wrecked near the Queen Charlotte Islands.

In 1893 Cunningham married again, to Flora Bicknell, formerly of Coventry, in England. They had two children, Hazel and Harold. A third, Edith, was born shortly after Robert's death, in April 1905, in Victoria, B.C., at the age of sixty-nine. He is buried in Metlakatla.

== See also ==
- Monte Cristo (sternwheeler)
- Steamboats of the Skeena River

== Sources ==
- Bowman, Phylis (1982) Klondike of the Skeena! Chilliwack, B.C.: Sunrise Printing.
- Harris, E. A. (1990) Spokeshute: Skeena River Memory. Victoria, B.C.: Orca Book Publishers.
- Large, R. Geddes (1957; reprinted, 1981) The Skeena: River of Destiny. Sidney, B.C.: Gray's Publishing.
