= Kitselas First Nation =

Kitselas
- Band No. 680
- People: Kitselas
- Headquarters: Terrace
- Province: British Columbia

Land
- Main reserve: Kitselas 1
- Land area: 10.69 km^{2} (4.13 sq mi)

Population (2024)
- On reserve: 303
- On other land: 18
- Off reserve: 456
- Total population: 777

Government
- Chief: Glen Bennett

Tribal Council
- Tsimshian First Nations

Website
- kitselas.com

Kitselas First Nation is the band government of the Kitselas subgroup of the Tsimshian. The band government is based at Gitaus in the Skeena Valley (near Kitselas, British Columbia, which is named for them) in the Skeena River valley to the northeast of the city of Terrace, British Columbia, Canada. Though there is no Tsimshian tribal council, they are a participant in the Tsimshian First Nations treaty council.

== History ==
The Kitselas First Nation have inhabited their lands for at least 5,000 years according to archaeological evidence. Their name is derived from Gitselasu which means ‘people of the canyon.’ The language of the Kitselas is Sm’algyax, which is the language for all bands of the Tsimshian Nation. The history of the Kitselas is told through narratives called adawx. Adawx talk about their origins through their perspective. Everyone belonging to the Tsimshian First Nation belongs to a clan or sub-clan. The Kitselas First Nation has four clans: Gispudwada (Killerwhale), Laxgiboo (Wolf), Laxsgiik (Eagle), and Ganhada (Raven).

=== Overview ===
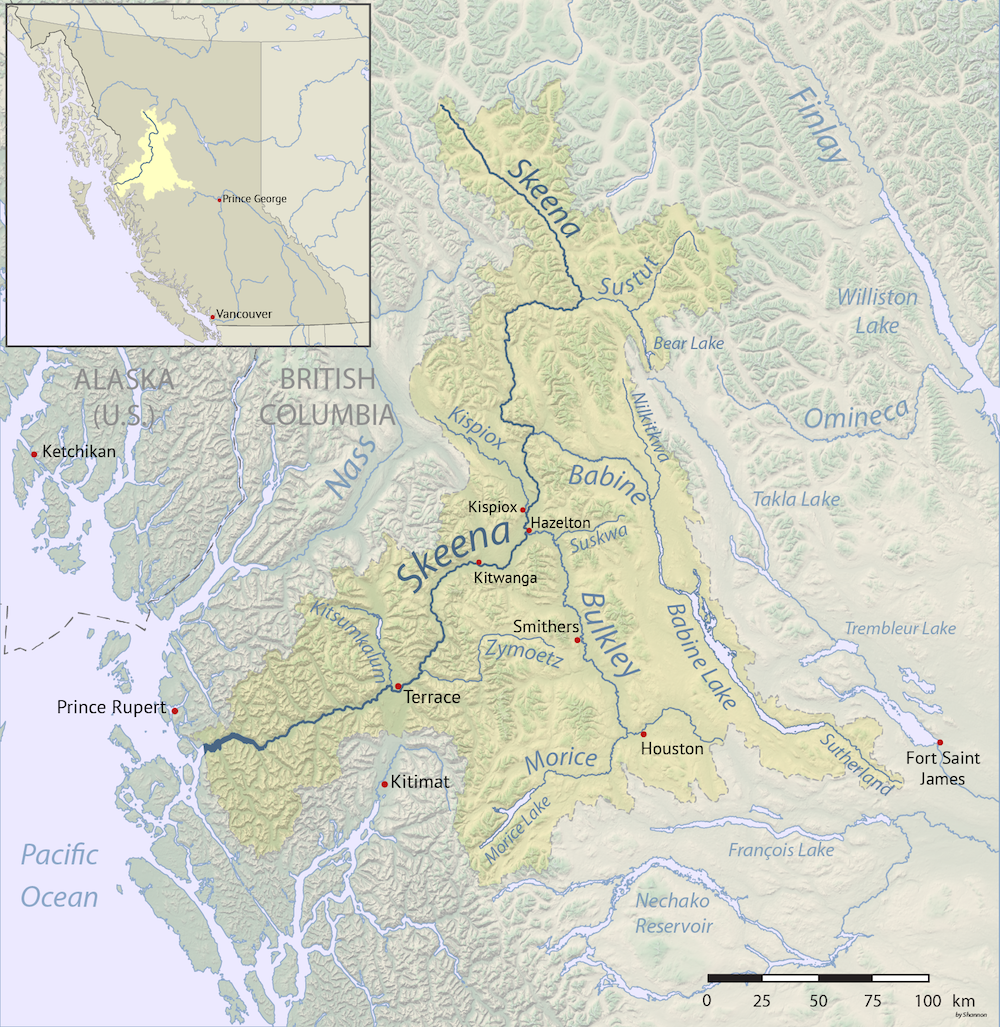
Map of the Skeena River.

The earliest record of European contact with the Kitselas was in the 1700s with Russian missionaries and fur traders. In 1792, British explorer George Vancouver mapped the coast of British Columbia for more trading ships to arrive and more traders ventured inland. This directly affected the Kitselas because it meant more people would be venturing onto their land. This would worsen in 1843 when the Hudson's Bay Company (HBC) created boundaries in British Columbia which essentially divided up native land in order for it to be settled or used by the British. The Kitselas held a strategic position on the Skeena River that allowed them to control trade with HBC because the river flowed inland from the coast. In 1858, James Douglas became the first governor of British Columbia and mapped out the Indian reserves. In 1859, the Skeena pass was claimed by William Downie for railroads, which meant more exploration along the Skeena River and Kitselas land continued to decrease. In 1864, Douglas was replaced by Joseph Trutch who reduced the size of reservations and created policies that were meant to discriminate against Indians. In 1867, the Constitution Act was passed which said that Canada was responsible for natives and that they had to reserve land for them. In 1872, the British took control of the Skeena River from the Kitselas, so they could no longer charge for people to enter the canyon. Tsimshian and Nisga’a Chiefs travel to Victoria in 1887 to plead for treaties and self governance, but are not obliged. In 1901, Kitselas Reserve territory was finalized and their land was reduced from 220,000 hectares to 1200 hectares. In 1904, the Homestead Act claimed that anybody except natives and Chinese could have 160 acres of land anywhere along the Skeena River for free. In 1927, Canada made it illegal for natives to fight for their land. In 1931, Tsimshian and Haida formed the Native Brotherhood of British Columbia where they discussed their grievances and this group still exists today. In 1946, the flu epidemic killed many Kitselas political leaders and the fight for their rights did not start again until the 1980s. In 1951, the Indian Act was changed and potlatch and claims to land were made legal again. In 1982, the Constitution Act recognized the rights of Indians. In 1984, Tsimshian Tribal Council was formed of 7 bands in the Northwest and together they would fight for the rights and lands that they had taken away from them by the British.

==== Kitselas Treaty ====
Kitselas has been working toward a treaty since 1993. The goal of the Kitselas Treaty is to get Kitselas out from under the Indian Act and make the nation self-governing. The Indian Act was passed in 1876 by the Canadian government and is meant to control every aspect of native life as well as controlling how natives are allowed to govern themselves on reserves. The Kitselas people want to make their own laws and adopt their own constitution. The Canadian government did this without speaking with the Natives first. The Kitselas Treaty is currently in Stage Five out of the 6 stages that it takes for a treaty to be ratified under the BC Treaty Commission's treaty negotiation process. In 2013, the Kitselas people voted in favor of the Agreement in Principle (AIP) which is essentially a rough draft of the Kitselas Treaty. The problem with the AIP is that it is not legally binding and thus the Kitselas people have been negotiating and working hard on the final draft. The final draft will be the Kitselas Treaty. Kitselas is part of the Tsimshian First Nation Treaty Society which is composed of the Kitselas, Gitga’at, Kitsumkalum, Metlakatla, Kitasoo/Xaixais. The Kitselas and the Kitsumkalum work closely together as both are in Stage Five in their respective treaties. This treaty is also an effort to regain lands. The Kitselas are currently in Phase 1 of their land use plan. They are taking suggestions from their community on what they have in mind for the future of the Kitselas Lands.

== Chief and councillors ==
Position	Name	Term start	Term end	Reference
Chief	Glenn Bennett	06/11/2021	Present	

== Economy ==
The Kitselas Development Corporation (KDC) is one of the main economic contributors for the Kitselas. The main focus of the KDC is to develop pieces of land that the Kitselas own and lease them to interested businesses as well as create employment opportunities for Kitselas people and people of other First Nations in order to utilize the profits to further the economy and diversity of the Kitselas First Nation. They want to find business opportunities within Kitselas territory. KDC works with government agencies and non government agencies for Kitselas development and opportunities. The KDC played a role in developing Kitselas Forestry Products and Wai Wah Environmental.

The Kitselas First Nation has a community hall on the Kulspai Reserve and it is available for rent for large events.

== Indian Reserves ==
The traditional land of the Kitselas encompasses British Columbia's Northern coast of the Pacific Ocean to Skeena Valley. The Kitselas have lived on this land for over 5,000 years. They live on 10 reserves, but the Gitaus and Kulspai reserves are the most populated. The Gitaus Reserve is also known as Kitselas Canyon and is the traditional home for the Kitselas First Nation. The Kulspai reserve was traditionally used as a place for canoes to be beached for people who were moving south to Lakelse Lake. The Kshish Indian Reserve (No. 4) is where the Kitselas people were relocated in the 1880s. This reserve is only occupied during the summer. The Kshish Indian Reserve has an additional part to it referred to as reservation No. 4B, which was given to the Kitselas to be used as a cemetery. Many of the reserves were affected by Canadian logging interests and land was often leased or agreements were broken for logging purposes. It is also not uncommon for land to be claimed for highways or railroads.

Indian reserves under the administration of the Kitselas First Nation are:

- Chimdimash Indian Reserve No. 2, (Tsimshian: Tsmdimaas) on the Skeena River at the mouth of Chimdemash Creek, 3 miles northeast of Usk, 65.10 ha. 54°40′00″N 128°22′00″W
- Chimdimash Indian Reserve No. 2A, left bank of Skeena River between Chimdemash and Mannix Creeks and adjoining Chimdimash IR No. 2, 119.30 ha. 54°41′00″N 128°21′00″W
- Ikshenigwolk Indian Reserve No. 3, (Tsimshian: Ks'nigwaalk) left bank of Skeena River at mouth of Legate Creek, 2 miles S of Pacific CN station, 28.70 ha. 54°45′00″N 128°16′00″W
- Ketoneda Indian Reserve No. 7 (Tsimshian: Git'ndaa), left bank of Skeena River 2 miles SE of Doreen CN station, 40.80 ha. 54°50′00″N 128°19′00″W
- Kitselas Indian Reserve No. 1, (Tsimshian: Git'aws) on the Skeena River at the mouth of Kleanza Creek one mile south of Usk, 434.60 ha. 54°37′00″N 128°25′00″W
- Kshish Indian Reserve No. 4 (Tsimshian: Endedoon, includes Kshish IR No. 4A), on right bank of Skeena River north of the mouth of the Zymoetz River, 258.30 ha. 54°34′00″N 128°28′00″W
- Kshish Indian Reserve No. 4B, an addition to Kshish IR No. 4, 4.0 ha. 54°34′00″N 128°28′00″W
- Kulspai Indian Reserve No. 6 (Tsimshian: Gn spaa), on left bank of Skeena River 3 miles south (downstream) from Terrace, 6.90 ha. 54°30′00″N 128°35′00″W
- Port Essington, on left bank of the Skeena River, at mouth of the Ecstall River (shared with the Kitsumkalum First Nation) 54°09′00″N 129°58′00″W
- Zaimoetz Indian Reserve No. 5, (Tsimshian: Tsmhuutsa)on left bank of the Skeena River at the mouth of the Zymoetz River, 109.40 ha. 54°33′00″N 128°29′00″W

== Programs and services ==
Kitselas First Nation offers several programs and services such as dog control services, education, emergency response, employment and training programs, garbage and recycling, health, housing, hunting and fishing, lands and resources, social development and youth programs.

== Demographics ==
The Kitselas First Nation has about 700 members.

== See also ==
- Kitselas Canyon
