= Tsimshian Tribal Council =

This is the disbanded tribal council; for the treaty council see Tsimshian First Nations

The Tsimshian Tribal Council was the governing coalition of the band governments of the Tsimshian people in Prince Rupert. In British Columbia, the governments of Canada started engaging in the British Columbia Treaty Process with First Nation bands in the province. Originally the Tsimshian Tribal Council pursued negotiations until late 2005 when the Tsimshian Tribal Council, the organization for treaty negotiations, dissolved amid legal and political turmoil.

== Membership ==
First Nation Number	First Nation Name
672	Gitxaala Nation
675	Hartley Bay Indian Band
680	Kitselas First Nation
681	Kitsumkalum First Nation
674	Lax-kw'alaams First Nation
540	Kitasoo/Xaixais First Nation
673	Metlakatla First Nation

== History ==
The governing council was formed in 1988 through the B.C. Society Act to represent several bands of the Tsimshian people. In 1994 after the British Columbia Treaty Process started the Tsimshian Tribal Council started negotiations for a comprehensive treaty agreement. However, in April 2004 the Council disbanded due to internal conflicts. The split centred on a power struggle over Treaty negotiation that became violent and resulted in the RCMP being called to stop what council members called a, "hostile takeover". A new Council the Tsimshian First Nations was formed in December 2004 without the Gitxaala Nation (formerly Kitkatla) and the Lax Kw'alaams First Nation to represent members in the BC Treaty Process.

== See also ==
- Tsimshian First Nations
