= Kitselas =

Tribe in northwestern Canada

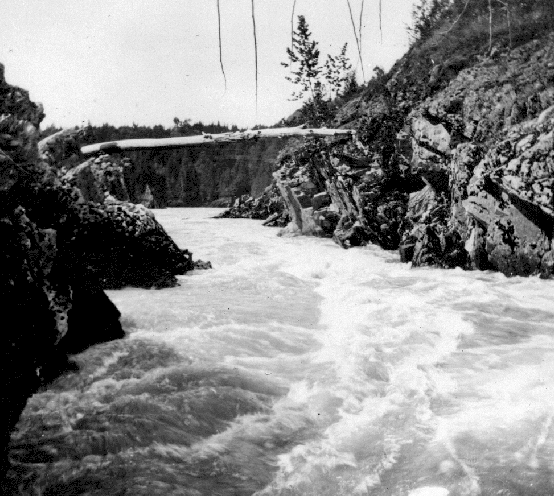
Kitselas canyon in 1910

Kitselas (Tsimshian: Gitselasu, lit. 'people of the Canyon') are one of the 14 tribes of the Tsimshian nation of British Columbia, in northwestern Canada. The original name Gits'ilaasü means "people of the canyon." The tribe is situated at Kitselas, British Columbia, at the upper end of Kitselas Canyon, which is on the Skeena River. It was once a great trading nexus, just outside and upriver from the city of Terrace. It is the most upriver of the 14 tribes and it borders the territory of the Gitxsan nation.

== Location ==
Today, the Kitselas people live mostly at two Indian reserves; one, at the Kulspai or Queensway reserve ("New Town"), is just across the river from Terrace. More recently, Kitselas people have begun to repopulate a more traditional and remote site on a bluff overlooking the Canyon, at Gitaus reserve (Git'aws meaning "people of the sand"). Gitaus is gradually becoming the centre of Kitselas life.

From the 1870s until the 1960s, many Kitselas and Kitsumkalum Tsimshians lived at the cannery town of Port Essington, farther down the Skeena River (now a ghost town), at the confluence of the Ecstall and Skeena rivers.

== Governance ==
Until its dissolution in 2005, the Tsimshian Tribal Council represented Kitselas in treaty negotiations with the provincial and federal governments. Its band government is the Kitselas First Nation.

William Beynon and the anthropologist Marius Barbeau recorded traditional information from Kitselas people at Port Essington, B.C., in 1924, including Chief Walter Wright and Chief Samuel Wise, who held the Kitselas Laxsgiik (Eagle-clan) name Gitxon.

Following are the house-groups (matrilineal extended families) of the Kitselas:

- House of Gagawtsgan -- Laxsgiik (Eagle clan)
- House of Gitxon—Laxsgiik (Eagle clan)
- House of Iyuu's -- Laxsgiik (Eagle clan)
- House of G'wam -- Ganhada (Raven clan)
- House of Niis'hawas -- Gispwudwada (Killerwhale clan)
- House of Niis'nagwalk—Laxsgiik (Eagle clan)
- House of Lax'Stell—LaxGibu (Wolf clan)
- House of Niis'taxo'ok—Gispwudwada (Killerwhale clan)
- House of Sats'an—Ganhada (Raven clan)
- House of Niis'Gitlope—Laxgiik (Eagle clan)
- House of Stee How—LaxGibu (Wolf clan)

Detailed narratives were also recorded from Chief Walter Wright (Niistaxo'ok) in the 1930s and collected in a volume called Men of Medeek.

== See also ==
- Kitselas First Nation
- Kitselas Canyon
