= John J. Cove =

Canadian anthropologist

John James Cove (19 September 1941 - 7 June 2014) was a Canadian anthropologist known for his work with the Gitksan First Nation of northern British Columbia. He was a Professor of anthropology and sociology at Carleton University in Ottawa, Ontario, Canada.

As recounted in the introduction to his book Shattered Images (1987), he was led to examine the oral traditions and cosmology of the Tsimshianic-speaking peoples—the Tsimshian, Gitksan, and Nisga'a—in 1973 when work on a computer simulation of the traditional Northwest Coast salmon harvest led him to search mythological references to famine. Around the same time, he became influenced by the structuralist approaches of Claude Lévi-Strauss and, through the help of George F. MacDonald, began an intensive study of the Tsimshianic narratives collected by Marius Barbeau and William Beynon.

In 1978 he attempted to begin a sabbatical year of fieldwork with the Gitksan, ostensibly studying the relationship between mythology and masks. The Gitksan-Carrier Tribal Council refused him permission to do fieldwork, on grounds of irrelevancy and lack of community control, until a compromise was reached between Cove and the director of the Gitksan land-claims office, Neil J. Sterritt, whereby Cove returned his grant money and worked for the Tribal Council studying "pre-contact relations with nature."

Eventually, he worked for eight years for the Gitksan and Wet'suwet'en ("Carrier") in research that eventually led to the Delgamuukw vs. the Queen land-claims case.

Cove also created a catalogue of the Barbeau-Beynon files and co-edited, with MacDonald, a selection of narratives collected by Barbeau and Beynon.

== Bibliography ==
- Cove, John J. (1982) "The Gitksan Traditional Concept of Land Ownership." Anthropologica, vol. 24, no. 1, pp. 3–17.
- Cove, John J. (1985) A Detailed Inventory of the Barbeau Northwest Coast Files. Ottawa: National Museums of Canada.
- Cove, John J. (1987) Shattered Images: Dialogues and Meditations on Tsimshian Narratives. Ottawa: Carleton University Press.
- Cove, John J. (1992) "Aboriginal over representation in prisons: what can be learned from Tasmania?" Australian and New Zealand Journal of Criminology. 25 (2): 156-168.
- Cove, John J. (1995) What do the bones say?: Tasmanian reflections on aborigines, science and domination. Ottawa: Carleton University Press.
- Cove, John J. (1996) "Playing the Devil’s Advocate: Anthropology in Delgamuukw". Political and Legal Anthropology Review, 19(2), 53–57.
- MacDonald, George F., and John J. Cove (eds.) (1987) Tsimshian Narratives. 2 vols. Ottawa: Directorate, Canadian Museum of Civilization.
