= Monte Cristo (sternwheeler) =

Steamboat completed in 1891

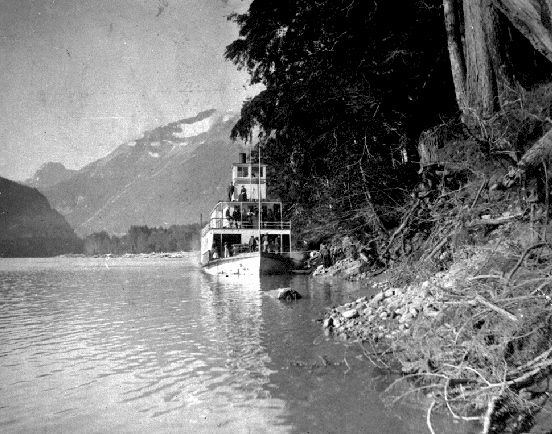
- Monte Cristo on the Skeena River.

History
- Name: Monte Cristo
- Route: Puget Sound, Snohomish, Stikine, and Skeena rivers
- Builder: John J. Holland
- Completed: 1891
- Out of service: 1903 or 1922
- Identification: US reg #92382 / Canadian reg. #107824
- Fate: Abandoned

General characteristics
- Tonnage: 187.77 gross / 128.08 reg. (as built); 266 gross / 155 reg. (as reconstructed).
- Length: 90.2 ft (27.5 m) (as built); 108.6 ft (33.1 m) (as reconstructed)
- Beam: 24.1 ft (7.3 m) (as built); 120.4 ft (36.7 m) (as reconstructed)
- Depth: 3 ft (0.9 m) (as built); 3.9 ft (1.2 m) (as reconstructed)
- Installed power: twin steam engines, horizontal mounted, 10 inch bore by 48 inch stroke, 10 net horsepower
- Propulsion: sternwheel

Monte Cristo was a sternwheel steamboat which was operated in Puget Sound and the coastal rivers of the state of Washington and the province of British Columbia.

== Career ==
The sources are in some conflict as to the early career of this vessel. According to one source, Monte Cristo was built in 1891 in Everett, Washington. According to another source, Monte Cristo was built in Ballard, Washington, by John J. Holland, with engines provided by the Moran Brothers.

The vessel's first owner was Henry Carstens, who had been a purser for the Oregon Railway and Navigation Company. He intended to use the boat on the Snohomish River. The vessel was 90 feet long. In 1893, Carstens sold Monte Cristo to Ernest Shellgren, who owned a store in Longbranch, Washington, where he was also the postmaster. Shellgren sold the vessel in 1896.

In 1898, Monte Cristo was sold to interests who took the vessel to Alaska for use on the Stikine River, which was then thought to be an alternative "All-Canadian" route to the Klondike gold rush. Monte Cristo was the second vessel to ascend the Stikine River in the 1898 season. The vessel was reregistered in Canada and rebuilt to be longer, narrower, and heavier.

In 1900, Monte Cristo was transferred to the Skeena River in British Columbia under the ownership of the firm of R. Cunningham and Son, of Port Essington, British Columbia, who were mounting a challenge to the domination of the Hudson's Bay Company on the Skeena River trade. Monte Cristo was later chartered by the Dominion government to be used again on the Stikine River for the construction of a telegraph line to the Yukon.

One source says Monte Cristo was abandoned in 1903; another gives the year as 1922.

== See also ==
- Robert Cunningham (entrepreneur)
- Steamboats of the Skeena River
- Steamboats of the Stikine River
- Puget Sound Mosquito Fleet
