= Gitlaan =

The Gitlan are one of the 14 tribes of the Tsimshian Nation in British Columbia, Canada, and referred to as one of the 'nine tribes of the lower Skeena River. The name Gitlan means "people of the Stern Canoe." Their traditional territory includes the watershed of the Zimacord River, a tributary of the Skeena River. An area of the riverbank there resembled from the distance a canoe-stern, hence the name of the tribe. The Gitlan had village sites at Venn Pass and around the harbour in addition to their main region on the Skeena River.

In 1887, some of the Gitlan tribe moved from Lax Kw'alaams and Metlakatla, B.C., along with other tribes' members from the mission, with the Anglican lay missionary William Duncan to found the community of "New" Metlakatla, Alaska. Sm'oygit Nis la ganoos (Simeon Gitlan) had followed the missionary to the new location. Bishop Ridley had been assigned by the Church Missionary Society to the seat of the New Caledonia diocese to be located at Metlakatla, BC. Disagreements ensued between Mr. Duncan and Mr. Ridley, including one about the eucharist in worship services. The division between them was noted by the Hereditary Chiefs and capitalized upon by them because they were not content with the changes wrought through the missionary. Eventually their disagreement permeated village life and destruction of property occurred. Bishop Ridley had traveled to England and returned with two letters for Mr. Duncan. One with praise from the Church Missionary society was to be delivered to Mr. Duncan after the disagreement had settled accordingly, and the other was a dismissal if the disagreement was not settled. Bishop Ridley handed Mr. Duncan the letter of dismissal regardless of the disagreement. Mr. Duncan traveled to Washington, D.C. to address congress and air his grievance with need of relocation for him and his converts. He was granted the Annette Islands in the U.S. territory of Alaska where he founded Metlakatla, AK. The majority of the mission village followed Duncan while a contingent of chiefs, including a Gitlan Sm'oygit (Chief), and people remained behind in the Metlakatla, B.C. village (Arctander, 1909; Church Missionary Society 1856, 1858, 1865)

The Gitlan consists of 17 House groups with two royal houses, one Ganhada (Raven), House of Xpe Hanaax and one Laxiboo (Wolf), House of Gwiskyaan. These two lineages are related through time and interwoven through their history, each provided lineage for Gitlan chiefs. A Nisga'a family from a related Laxgibuu (Wolf clan) House group was married into the Gitlan. This matriline included or came to include sons of the Gispaxlo'ots House chief and Hudson's Bay Company employee Arthur Wellington Clah, and Albert Wellington, who served as chief of the Gitlan Laxibou with the name Gwisk'aayn until his death in 1913. Wellington's sister's son, William Beynon, who was to become the renowned ethnologist, moved from Victoria, B.C., to Lax Kw'alaams at that time to preside over Wellington's funerary rites and assume the title Gwisk'aayn and with it the Laxibou chieftainship, in accordance with Tsimshian rules of matrilineal succession, though there was initial hesitation because Beynon had become "enfranchised" as a Canadian citizen. Colonial intrusions attempted to disrupt the hereditary system. Beynon was chief of the Laxibou Gitlan until his death in 1958.

In 1935 William Beynon recorded that Gitlan people in Lax Kw'alaams included 4 members of the Gispwudwada (Killerwhale clan), 8 members of the Ganhada (Raven), and 9 members of the Laxgibuu (Wolf), each clan being represented by only one house-group. Other House groups were located in Metlakatla, BC, Metlakatla, AK, and other areas in Tsimshian territory.

== Prominent Gitlans ==
- William Beynon, chief and ethnologist
- Odille Morison, linguist and artifact collector
- Michael Epp, artist carver
- Bilham 'neex Loa Ryan, Gitlan, House of Xpe Hanaax, Ganhada - artist - traditional cedar weaver[18]
- Sm'hayetsk Teresa Ryan, PhD., Gitlan, House of Xpe Hanaax, Ganhada - scientist, author, artist - traditional cedar weaver
- Rev. William Soloman White, the first Sm'algyax speaking reverend. House of Gwiskyaan

== Bibliography ==
- Anderson, Margaret, and Marjorie Halpin (2000) "Introduction" to Potlatch at Gitsegukla: William Beynon's 1945 Field Notebooks, ed. by Margaret Anderson and Marjorie Halpin, pp. 3–52. Vancouver: UBC Press.
- Arctander, J. W. 1909. The Apostle of Alaska: The Story of William Duncan of Metlakahtla. New York: Fleming H. Revell Company.
- Beynon, William (1941) "The Tsimshians of Metlakatla, Alaska." American Anthropologist (new series), vol. 43, pp. 83–88
- Garfield, Viola E. (1939) "Tsimshian Clan and Society." University of Washington Publications in Anthropology, vol. 7, no. 3, pp. 167–340.
- Church Missionary Intelligencer. 1856. The Church Missionary Intelligencer, A Monthly Journal of Missionary Information. Vol. VII. London: Seeley, Jackson, and Halliday, Fleet Street, and Hanover Street, Hanover Square; T. Hatchard, Piccadilly; and J. Nisbet and Co.
- Church Missionary Intelligencer. 1858. The Church Missionary Intelligencer, A Monthly Journal of Missionary Information. Vol. IX. London: Seeley, Jackson, and Halliday, Fleet Street, and B. Seeley, Hanover Street, Hanover Square; T. Hatchard, Piccadilly; and J. Nisbet and Co., Berners Street.
- Church Missionary Society. 1865. The Church Missionary Atlas. Maps of the Various Missions of the Church Missionary Society, with Illustrative Letter-Press (Fourth Edition). London: Seeley, Jackson, and Halliday.
- Halpin, Marjorie M. (1978) "William Beynon, Ethnographer, Tsimshian, 1888-1958." In American Indian Intellectuals: 1976 Proceedings of the American Ethnological Society, ed. by Margot Liberty, pp. 140–156. St. Paul: West Publishing Company.
- McDonald, James A. (1983) "An Historic Event in the Political Economy of the Tsimshian: Information on the Ownership of the Zimacord District." B.C. Studies, no. 57, pp. 24–37.
- Roth, Christopher. 2008. Becoming Tsimshian: The Social Life of Names. Seattle: University of Washington Press.
- Ryan, Teresa. 2014. Territorial Jurisdiction: The cultural and economic significance of eulachon Thaleichthys pacificus in the north-central coast region of British Columbia. PhD Dissertation, UBC.
