= Constance Cox (interpreter) =

Canadian interpreter

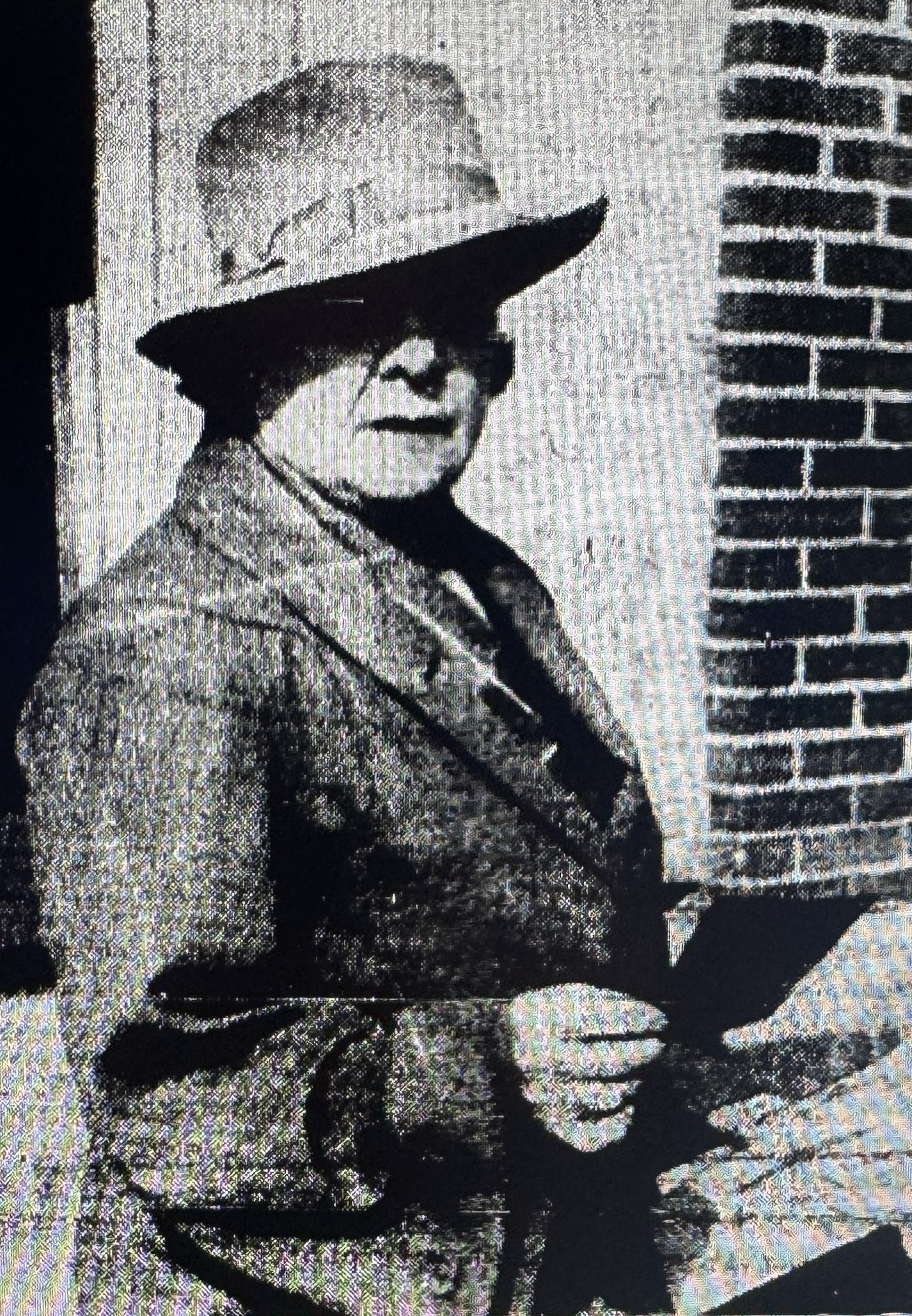
Constance Cox in 1949.

Constance Cox (c. 1881–1963) was a Canadian schoolteacher of part Tlingit ancestry who lived and taught with the Gitksan First Nation in northwestern British Columbia and served as interpreter for several anthropologists.

== Early life and education ==
She was born to Thomas and Margaret Hankin in Hazelton, British Columbia, and was considered, despite her mixed ancestry, the first white child born in that community. She was baptised by William Ridley, Bishop of the Church of England's Caledonia (northern B.C.) diocese. Her father, Thomas Hankin, sponsored a $3,000 (Cdn) potlatch feast to present the infant Constance to the large population of Gitksans who had come to live at Hazelton.

Hankin, a former Hudson's Bay Company employee, had founded Hazelton on his English godmother's legacy, built a store there, and also provided founding investments in the cannery communities of Inverness, and Port Essington, B.C. Margaret Hankin was Tlingit on her mother's side, while her father was an HBC employee. Margaret spoke seven different First Nations languages and passed much of this profiency on to Constance. (Later, Margaret remarried, to Captain R. E. Loring, Indian Agent at Hazelton.)

== Career ==
While serving as Hazelton police interpreter in the trial of three Gitksans arrested in a near-battle between settler miners and Gitksans at Hazelton, Constance met a telegraphist named Eddie R. Cox, whom she married.

Starting in the 1920s, she served as interpreter and sometimes informant during some of the anthropologist Marius Barbeau's fieldwork among the Gitksan. (Some of Barbeau's use of her and her mother's ethnographic and historical information in print led to a recriminatory letter from Cox.) Barbeau eventually began to rely more on the Tsimshian chief William Beynon's services as interpreter in his Gitksan work.

She moved to North Vancouver, B.C., with her husband when his employer transferred him there.

In 1947, Cox met Toronto Star reporter Dorothy Livesay on the street in Prince George, and admitted that she was doing penance for "robbing" Canada for the Field Museum in Chicago: "I collected thousands of dollars worth of Indian relics, pioneer equipment, photographs, letters. They even wanted muskets and knives. And I shipped them all out of the country. Now I regret it. The history of our pioneer days should stay where people can be reminded of it. It should be housed at some central point like Prince George, where tourists can see it." Livesay referred to Cox as "a walking historical society."

Two years later, on a return visit to Prince George (two of her daughters had married local men and were living in town with several grandchildren), Cox offered her "unique" collection to the local newspaper, the Citizen: all she asked in return was for the collection to be housed in the Civic Centre. Harry Perry, Citizen editor and former mayor, MLA and cabinet minister, called the mayor, Jack Nicholson, about the offer, who seemed enthusiastic. But it took several years to materialize. City Council was not so enthusiastic.

Cox lived in Prince George in the early 50s, was "active with the Girl Guide Association, the Women's Auxiliary to the Prince George and District Hospital, and the WA [Women's Auxiliary] of St. Michael's Church. She has also been active with the Canadian Folk Society... and last year had the signal honor of being made a member of the Native Brotherhood. She is also honorary member of the Prince George Gun Club, to whom she presented a gun 140 years old, which her grandfather had used in the Crimean War...." Cox also wrote articles for the paper on old-timers, and she had a radio series on CBC titled "Little Moccasin Trails" starting in June 1950: these were stories in 15-minute segments that she learned from the elders of the tribe in the Indian language, and she wrote them "hoping to preserve another part of the rapidly disappearing heritage of the Indians."

In May 1954, Cox and her husband left Prince George, retiring to White Rock, B.C. She handed over her collection to the Prince George Rotary Club, which, led by Dr. Ian Evans, started the Prince George and District Historical Society, a branch of the B.C. Historical Society in May 1956. Cox's collection was displayed in a log cabin museum, set up on the auditorium floor of the Civic Centre in December 1958. Lheidli T'enneh elder, 105 year old Granny Seymour, cut the ribbon.

In January 1958, Cox sought to raise $600 for the White Rock Boy Scouts and Girl Guides: "There's nothing to it. I shall simply collect $1 for 600 persons, explaining that they can have a hand in forming the lives of today's youth." After raising $289 for the Hilltop Youth Centre, Cox was asked to give up, with the Lions Club and others taking up the torch.

Later in 1958, Cox served as interpreter when the anthropologists Wilson Duff and Michael Kew brokered an agreement with the nearby Gitksan community of Kitwancool (a.k.a. Gitanyow), arranging for some of the village's totem poles to be removed to the Royal British Columbia Museum for preservation. She also served as interpreter in creating the monograph by Duff that resulted.

Cox's stories were part of a special 48-page centennial edition of The Native Voice, the official organ of the Native Brotherhood of B.C.

== Death and legacy ==
She died in White Rock on May 21, 1963, aged 82. The Vancouver Sun called her "a champion of B.C. Indian rights...[who] promoted several projects aimed at improving health standards among Indian tribes in B.C."

Sadly, most of the collection she donated to what became the Fraser-Fort George Regional Museum was destroyed by fire in December 1976. Only a gun survived, and is now in the collection of The Exploration Place.

== Sources ==
- Cox, Constance (1958) Simon Gun-a-Noot: The Authentic Story. Native Voice (special ed.), pp. 34–37.
- Duff, Wilson (ed.) (1959) Histories, Territories, and Laws of the Kitwancool. (Anthropology in British Columbia Memoir no. 4.) Victoria, B.C.: Royal British Columbia Museum.
- Neylan, Susan (2003) The Heavens Are Changing: Nineteenth-Century Protestant Missions and Tsimshian Christianity. Montreal: McGill-Queen's University Press.
- Nowry, Laurence (1995) Marius Barbeau, Man of Mana: A Biography. Toronto: NC Press
- Pedelty, Donovan (1997) "Constance Cox." In Pioneer Legacy: Chronicles of the Lower Skeena River, Volume 1, ed. by Norma V. Bennett, pp. 227–230. Terrace, B.C.: Dr. R. E. M. Lee Hospital Foundation.
- Sterritt, Neil J., Susan Marsden, Robert Galois, Peter R. Grant, and Richard Overstall (1998) Tribal Boundaries in the Nass Watershed. Vancouver: University of British Columbia Press.
