= Gispwudwada =

Indigenous people of British Columbia/Alaska

The Gispwudwada or Gisbutwada (variously spelled) is the name for the Killerwhale "clan" (phratry) in the language of the Tsimshian nation of British Columbia, Canada, and southeast Alaska. It is considered analogous or identical to the Gisgahaast (variously spelled; also Gisk'aast) clan in British Columbia's Gitxsan nation and the Gisḵ'ahaast/Gisḵ'aast Tribe of the Nisg̱a'a. The Nisg̱a'a also call this group the Killerwhale Tribe, though the Gitxsan use the term Fireweed clan; Gisgahaast means literally "people of the fireweed."

The name Gispwudwada is of unknown etymology.

The chief crests of the Gispwudwada are the Killerwhale (a.k.a. orca) ('neexł in Tsimshian) and Grizzly Bear (midiik).

Tsimshian matrilineal houses belonging to the Gispwudwada tend to belong to one of two groups, the Git'mlaxam and the Gitnagwinaks.

== Git'mlaxam ==
The Git'mlaxam trace their origins to the legendary Temlaxam (a.k.a. Temlaham, Dimlahamid, etc.) or "Prairie Town" on the Skeena River in what is now Gitksan territory. The Git'mlaxam can be further subdivided.

Git'mlaxam house-groups among the Tsimshian include the royal House of Ts'ibasaa in the Gitkxaała (Kitkatla) tribe.

== Gitnagwinaks ==
The Gitnagwinaks (sometimes spelled Nagunaks) trace their migrations southward, to the vicinity of the Kitasoo Tsimshians at Klemtu, British Columbia. In a discussion of the Bear Mother myth, the anthropologist Marius Barbeau in 1950 published information recorded by the Tsimshian ethnologist William Beynon from his fellow Gitlaan Tsimshian E. Maxwell which describes a dispute among the Kitasoo Gispwudwada house-heads Wuts'iint, Dzagmsagisk, and T'amks as to ownership of certain crest privileges, resulting in migration to Kitkatla, Gitwilgyoots, and Gitlaan tribes of Tsimshians.

The following Gitnagwinaks crests are listed:

- Grizzly Bear of the Sea (midiigm ts'm 'aks)
- Double-Finned Killerwhale (wüsngoopskinm née'x 'neexł)
- Killerwhale with Fins All Around (txatkunee'xs)
- Ligidadools, wife of the monster chief of the Nagwinaks

== Nisg̱a'a - Gisḵ'ahaast (People among the Fireweed) ==
- House of Ẁii Seeks - Ivan Mercer
  - Ts'iibaasaa is a name from this house used all over the coast of bc.
  - Belongs to Nass river family of W'ii Seeks, Ts'iibaasaa Is held by Steven Bright
- House of W̓isin Xbiĺtkw - Matthew Moore (Previously Andrew Mercer)
  - The late Ẁii Lisims (Frank Calder) was from this house.
- House of Daax̱an - (previously Perry Azak)
- House of Ni'isýuus - Willard Martin
- House of W̓ii Lax̱ha - Peter Stevens (Previously James Stevens, Sim’oogit Ḵ’amksiiwaa)
- Most common crests of Nass River Gisk'ahaast are:
  - Hlguwilksihlgum N̓eekhl (Prince Killer Whale),
  - Midiigim Tsa’W̓ii Aks (Grizzly Bear of The Big Water) used only by the royal T’imlaxaam Houses,
  - k'utk'unukws (Owl),
  - Psday̓ (Grouse),
  - Haḵ (Goose),
  - Hloks (Sun),
  - Hloksim Axkw (Moon),
  - Bil̓ist (Star),
  - Max̱maḵ’ay (Rainbow)

The Nisga'a no longer rank their chieftains as "head chief" of a tribe.

== Bibliography ==
- Barbeau, Marius (1928) The Downfall of Temlaham. Toronto: MacMillan.
- Barbeau, Marius (1929) Totem Poles of the Gitksan, Upper Skeena River, British Columbia. (Anthropological Series 12, National Museum of Canada Bulletin 61.) Ottawa: Canada, Department of Mines.
- Barbeau, Marius (1950) Totem Poles. (2 vols.) (Anthropology Series 30, National Museum of Canada Bulletin 119.) Ottawa: National Museum of Canada. Reprinted, Canadian Museum of Civilization, Hull, Quebec, 1990.
- Glavin, Terry (1990) A Death Feast in Dimlahamid. Vancouver: New Star Books
- Harris, Kenneth B., and Frances M. P. Robinson (1974) Visitors Who Never Left: The Origin of the People of Damelahamid. Vancouver: University of British Columbia Press
- Robinson, Will (1962) Men of Medeek. As told by Walter Wright. Kitimat, British Columbia: Northern Sentinel Press.
- Council of Elders, Ayuuḵhl Nisg̱a'a Department & Nisg̱a'a Lisims Government (2008) Anhluut'ukwsim Saẁinskhl Nisg̱a'a: Nisg̱a'a Feast Procedures & Protocols Gitlax̱t'aamiks, British Columbia
