= Odille Morison =

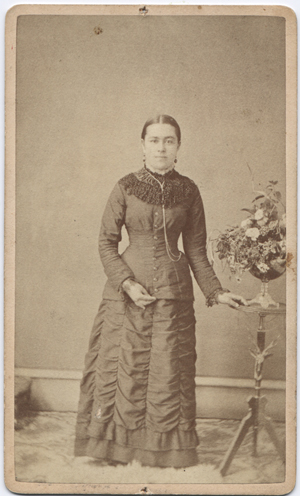
Morison c. 1880

Odille Morison (July 17, 1855 – 1933) was a Canadian linguist, artifact collector, and community leader from the Tsimshian First Nation of northwestern British Columbia.

== Biography ==
She was born July 17, 1855, in the Tsimshian village of Lax Kw'alaams, then known by its colonial name of Fort Simpson or Port Simpson. She was the daughter of a Tsimshian traditional healer and midwife named Mary Quintal (later Curtis) and French Canadian employee of the Hudson's Bay Company (HBC) fort in the village, François Quintal. Following her mother in the matrilineal system of the Tsimshian, Odille was a member of the Gitlaan tribe and most likely of the Raven crest. She grew up trilingual, in English, Tsimshian, and French, and also knew the Chinook Jargon trade language. When, in 1862, the Anglican lay missionary at Port Simpson, William Duncan, relocated a portion of his flock to found the nearby utopian Christian community of Metlakatla, the Quintals moved with him. Odille was educated in Metlakatla's mission school.

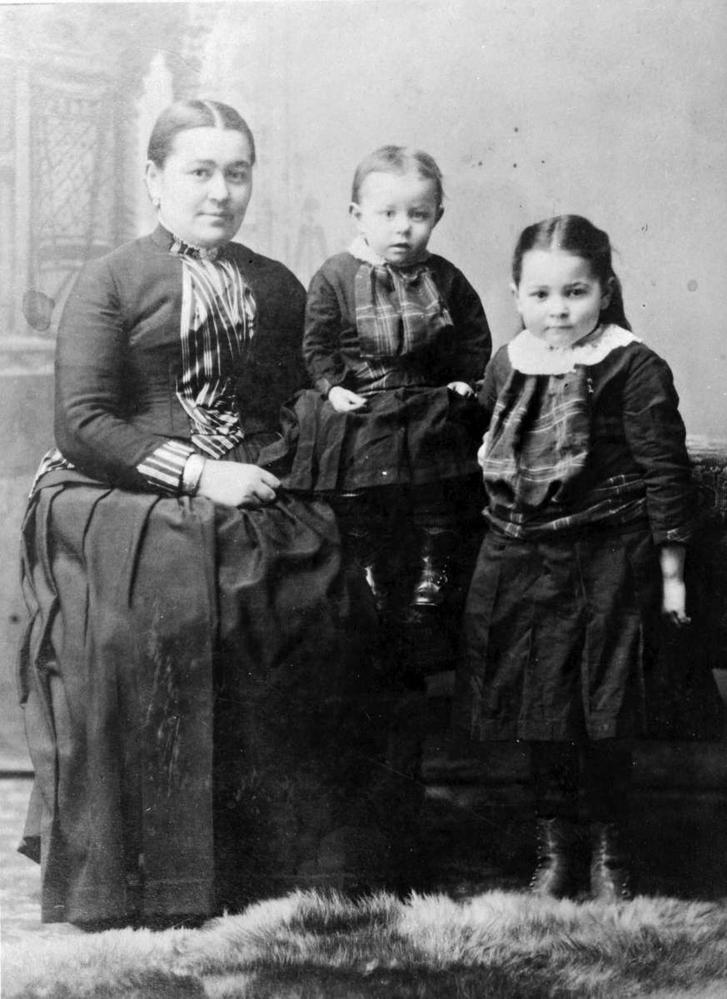
Morison and her children c. 1890

In August 1872 Odille, aged seventeen, married Charles F. Morison, an Englishman and a clerk with the HBC. They were married by a ship's chaplain because the missionary in charge, the Rev. Robert Tomlinson, for unknown reasons refused to marry them. The Morisons also kept a home in Port Essington, a cannery town whose founder, Robert Cunningham, had been Mary Quintal's brother-in-law.

== Works ==
Odille waded into the doctrinal rivalry between Duncan and his Anglican bishop William Ridley by translating (against Duncan's instincts) sections of the New testament and prayer book into the Tsimshian language, Sm'algyax. Her work became the basis for the first practical spelling system of Tsimshian, the so-called "Ridley orthography." Odille's partisanship in the Duncan-Ridley schism contributed to her decision to stay in "Old" Metlakatla when Duncan, in 1887, founded a new community at "New" Metlakatla, Alaska, with 800 Tsimshian settlers. She was entirely devoted to her extended Tsimshian family, who also remained behind.

In 1888 Odille met the anthropologist Franz Boas during his visit to Port Essington. He facilitated the publication of an article by Odille on Tsimshian proverbs for the Journal of American Folk-Lore in 1889 and over the next few years she gathered for Boas over 140 artifacts to be displayed at the 1893 Columbian Exposition in Chicago, including two totem poles. She also sent Boas ethnographic data.

== Death ==
Both Charles and Odille Morison died in 1933 in Metlakatla, B.C.

== Sources ==
- Atkinson, Maureen (2006) '"Affection and Kindness and Utterly Fearless": The Living Legacy of Odille Morison,' Living Landscapes (Northwest) web report, Royal BC Museum.
- Atkinson, Maureen L. (2008) "One Sided Conversations: Chapters in the Life of Odille Morison." Unpublished MA thesis, Athabasca University
- Campbell, Kenneth (2005) Persistence and Change: A History of the Ts'msyen Nation. Prince Rupert, British Columbia: First Nations Education Council
- Collison, W. H. (1915) In the Wake of the War Canoe: A Stirring Record of Forty Years' Successful Labour, Peril and Adventure amongst the Savage Indian Tribes of the Pacific Coast, and the Piratical Head-Hunting Haida of the Queen Charlotte Islands, British Columbia. Toronto: Musson Book Company. Reprinted by Sono Nis Press, Victoria, B.C. (ed. by Charles Lillard), 1981.
- Morison, O. (1889) "Tsimshian Proverbs." Journal of American Folk-Lore, vol. 2, no. 7, pp. 285–286.
- Rohner, Ronald P. (1969) The Ethnography of Franz Boas: Letters and Diaries of Franz Boas Written on the North-West Coast from 1886 to 1931. Chicago: University of Chicago Press.
