= Marjorie Halpin =

American-Canadian anthropologist

Marjorie Halpin (February 11, 1937 – August 30, 2000) was an American-Canadian anthropologist best known for her work on Northwest Coast art and culture, especially the Tsimshian and Gitksan peoples.

She earned an M.A. from George Washington University in 1963. She worked for five years for the Smithsonian Institution. In 1968 she moved to Vancouver, British Columbia, to begin doctoral work at the University of British Columbia, where she worked closely under the anthropologist Wilson Duff.

Her 1973 Ph.D. thesis, The Tsimshian Crest System: A Study Based on Museum Specimens and the Marius Barbeau and William Beynon Field Notes, is considered an important early structuralist study of Northwest Coast culture. It was also the first monograph based on systematic and theoretically engaged analysis of the unpublished Barbeau-Beynon treasure-trove of ethnographic data, for which Duff had compiled a voluminous set of summaries.

Also in 1973, Halpin was appointed to UBC's anthropology faculty, where she served for the remainder of her career. She eventually became curator of the Northwest Coast collection at UBC's Museum of Anthropology, a collection which she helped bring to international prominence. In that capacity she worked closely with Northwest Coast artists such as Bill Reid and Robert Davidson.

In 1980 Halpin did fieldwork on Tsimshian personal naming practices in Hartley Bay, B.C., working with descendants of some of Beynon's informants.

Her list of publications included a best-selling guide to totem poles, a well-known edited volume on the sasquatch, and an early study of Beynon's life and work.

In 1997, Halpin, with her colleague Margaret Seguin Anderson, did fieldwork in the Gitksan village of Gitsegukla, B.C. This was part of her process to realize a long-term ambition to publish Beynon's four volumes of fieldnotes from a 1945 totem pole-raising ceremony in that community. The resulting volume, with extensive commentary and new information, was published shortly before Halpin's death in 2000.

Also in the last year of her life, Halpin participated in a major Northwest Coast studies conference in Paris in honor of Claude Lévi-Strauss, a renowned French anthropologist. She was recognized for her pivotal role at the intersection of French structuralism and the study of Northwest Coast cultures.

Marjorie Myers Halpin died August 30, 2000, of cancer, at her home in White Rock, B.C., at the age of 63.

== Works ==
- (1973) The Tsimshian Crest System: A Study Based on Museum Specimens and the Marius Barbeau and William Beynon Field Notes. Ph.D. thesis, Department of Anthropology and Sociology, University of British Columbia, Vancouver.
- (1978) "William Beynon, Ethnographer, Tsimshian, 1888-1958." In American Indian Intellectuals: 1976 Proceedings of the American Ethnological Society, ed. by Margot Liberty, pp. 140–156. St. Paul: West Publishing Company.
- (1980) (ed.) (with Michael M. Ames) Manlike Monsters on Trial: Early Records and Modern Evidence. Vancouver: UBC Press. (Halpin's contributions: "Investigating the Goblin Universe," "The Tsimshian Monkey Mask and Sasquatch.")
- (1983) Totem Poles: An Illustrated Guide. Seattle: University of Washington Press.
- (1983) (ed.) (with N. Ross Crumrine), The Power of Symbols: Masks and Masquerade in the Americas. Vancouver: UBC Press. (Halpin's contributions: "The Mask of Tradition.")
- (1984) "Feast Names at Hartley Bay." pp. 57–64 In The Tsimshian: Images of the Past: Views for the Present, ed. by Margaret Seguin, pp. 57–64. Vancouver: UBC Press.
- (1984) "'Seeing in Stone': Tsimshian Masking and the Twin Stone Masks." pp. 281–307 In The Tsimshian: Images of the Past: Views for the Present, ed. by Margaret Seguin, pp. 57–64. Vancouver: UBC Press.
- (1984) "The Structure of Tsimshian Totemism." In The Tsimshian and Their Neighbors of the North Pacific Coast, ed. by Jay Miller and Carol M. Eastman, pp. 16–35. Seattle: University of Washington Press.
- (1990) (with Margaret Seguin) "Tsimshian Peoples: Southern Tsimshian, Coast Tsimshian, Nishga, and Gitksan." pp. 267–284 In Handbook of North American Indians, Volume 7: Northwest Coast, ed. by Wayne Suttles, pp. 267–284. Washington: Smithsonian Institution
- (2000) (ed.) (with Margaret Anderson) (2000) Potlatch at Gitsegukla: William Beynon's 1945 Field Notebooks. Vancouver: UBC Press.
- (2004) "Lévi-Straussian Structuralism on the Northwest Coast." In Coming to Shore: Northwest Coast Ethnology, Traditions, and Visions, ed. by Marie Mauzé, Michael E. Harkin, and Sergei Kan, pp. 91–105. Lincoln: University of Nebraska Press.

== Sources ==
- Obituary for Marjorie Myers Halpin, Anthropology News, vol. 42, no. 5 (2001), p. 29.
