= Kitsumkaylum Indian Reserve No. 1 =

Coordinates: 54°32′00″N 128°40′00″W

Kitsumkaylum is an Indian reserve under the governance of the Kitsumkalum First Nation of the Tsimshian people, located near the city of Terrace in the Skeena Country of northwestern British Columbia, Canada.
