= Gitzaxłaał =

Location of Gitxaala Nation

The Gitzaxłaał are one of the 14 tribes of the Tsimshian nation in British Columbia, Canada, and one of the nine of those tribes making up the "Nine Tribes" of the lower Skeena River resident at Lax Kw'alaams (a.k.a. Port Simpson), B.C. The name Gitzaxłaał means literally "people of (an unidentified variety of shrub)."

Traditional territories include:

- the watershed of the Ecstall River, a tributary of the Skeena River, including the now abandoned town, Port Essington B.C.
- areas on Dundas Island.

The chieftainship of the Gitzaxłaał is associated with the hereditary name-title Niisho'ot. The anthropologist Viola Garfield wrote in 1938 that Niisho'ot at that point was an elderly man who had succeeded his mother's brother Henry Nelson to the title, in accordance with rules of matrilineal succession. However, he was one of only three members of his house-group (matrilineal family) in Lax Kw'alaams and so had "adopted his daughter's son as his nephew" to ensure his succession.

Since 1834, they have been based at Lax Kw'alaams, when a Hudson's Bay Company fort was established there. In 1935 William Beynon recorded that Gitzaxłaał people in Lax Kw'alaams included only 4 members, all of them members of the Ganhada (Raven clan).
