= Kitsumkalum First Nation =

Kitsumkalum Band No. 681
- People: Kitsumkalum (Tsimshian)
- Headquarters: Terrace
- Province: British Columbia

Land
- Main reserve: Kitsymkaylum 1
- Other reserve(s): Port Essington; Dalk-ka-gila Quoeux 2; Zimagord 3

Population (2024)
- On reserve: 245
- On other land: 10
- Off reserve: 645
- Total population: 900

Government
- Chief: Don Roberts

Tribal Council
- Tsimshian First Nations

Website
- kitsumkalum.com

Kitsumkalum First Nation is a band government of the Tsimshian people based at Kitsumkalum, British Columbia in the Skeena River valley in the North Coast region near Terrace, British Columbia, Canada. They are a member government of the Tsimshian First Nations treaty council.

== Chief and Councillors ==
Position	Name	Term start	Term end
Chief	Don Roberts	3/8/2023	3/7/2025
Councillor	Cynthia Bohn	3/8/2023	3/7/2025
Councillor	Wayne Bolton	3/8/2023	3/7/2025
Councillor	Wayne Bolton	3/8/2023	3/7/2025
Councillor	Aaron Horner	3/8/2023	3/7/2025
Councillor	Sam Tro	3/8/2023	3/7/2025
Councillor	Jeanette Spalding	3/8/2023	3/7/2025
Councillor	Lisa Wesley	3/8/2023	3/7/2025

== Demographics ==
The Kitsumkalum First Nation has 900 members, 245 of whom live on reserve.

== Indian reserves ==
Indian reserves under the administration of the Kitsumkalum First Nation are:

- Dalk-ka-gila-quoeux Indian Reserve No. 2, on the Kitsumkalum River, 6 miles NW of Terrace, 114.10 ha. 54°35′00″N 128°39′00″W
- Kitsumkaylum Indian Reserve No. 1, on the right bank of the Skeena River at the mouth of the Kitsumkalum River, 449.90 ha. 54°32′00″N 128°40′00″W
- Port Essington, on left bank of the Skeena River, at mouth of the Ecstall River
- Zimagord Indian Reserve No. 3, right bank of Skeena River at the mouth of the Zymagotitz River, at Remco CN station, 31. 0 ha. 54°29′00″N 128°44′00″W
