= Wilson Duff =

Canadian archaeologist, anthropologist, and curator (1925-1976)

Wilson Duff (March 23, 1925 in Vancouver – August 8, 1976) was a Canadian archaeologist, cultural anthropologist, and museum curator.

He is remembered for his research on First Nations cultures of the Northwest Coast, notably the Tsimshian, Gitxsan, and Haida, and especially for his interest in their plastic arts, such as totem poles. Along with Bill Holm and Harry Hawthorn, he was one of a small coterie of academics in the 1950s and '60s who worked to bring Northwest Coast art to international prominence.

== Biography ==
Duff obtained a B.A. from the University of British Columbia (UBC) in 1949 and a master's in anthropology in 1951 from the University of Washington in Seattle, where he studied with Erna Gunther. His master's thesis was based on fieldwork with the Stó:lõ Salish people of the Fraser River in B.C. He collaborated with Charles E. Borden in 1952 to develop the Borden System for archeological site designations. He served as Curator of Anthropology at the British Columbia Provincial Museum (later known as the Royal British Columbia Museum or RBCM) in Victoria from 1950 to 1965, at which point he joined the faculty at the Department of Anthropology and Sociology at UBC. He was a founding member of the British Columbia Museums Association, and in the 1950s worked to preserve the last remaining totem poles on Haida Gwaii (formerly the Queen Charlotte Islands).

In 1958, Duff and his assistant curator Michael Kew brokered an agreement with the Gitksan community of Kitwancool (a.k.a. Gitanyow), arranging for some of the village's totem poles to be removed to the RBCM for preservation, in exchange for replicas and for the publication of the Kitwancool people's histories, territories, and laws. During this project, Duff and Kew worked through the part-Tlingit interpreter for the Gitksan, Constance Cox.

In 1958-59, while he was a professor of anthropology at the University of British Columbia, he worked alongside the anthropologist and folklorist Marius Barbeau in Ottawa on a Canada Council Senior Fellowship, organizing Barbeau and William Beynon's massive fieldnotes and other material on the Tsimshianic-speaking peoples (Tsimshian, Gitksan, and Nisga'a). Duff became a champion of the importance of the Barbeau-Beynon corpus, though he distanced himself from Barbeau's more controversial theories on the recent peopling of the Americas.

In 1960 he did fieldwork in Gitksan and Nisga'a communities, and in 1969 he served in court as an expert witness in the Nisga'a land-claims case Calder vs. Attorney-General of B.C., the famous "Calder case."

In his later years he was consumed with studying Haida art in all its formalistic and cosmological complexity—taking in structuralist and psychoanalytical insights—an endeavour which he undertook with his friend the Haida artist Bill Reid but which never resulted in a comprehensive published articulation. His immersion in the Haida thought-world was so total that, as he wrote in the early 1970s, colleagues "are concerned about my sanity and reputation."

His students included the anthropologist Marjorie Halpin.

He committed suicide in his faculty office with a shotgun on August 8, 1976. The subsequent death of Lilo Berliner, a correspondent of Duff who left their letters on the doorstep of poet Phyllis Webb, led to the creation of the memorial poetry sequence "Artifacts" in the collection Wilson's Bowl (1980).

== Selected works ==
- (ed.) (1959) Histories, Territories, and Laws of the Kitwancool. (Anthropology in British Columbia Memoir no. 4.) Victoria, B.C.: Royal British Columbia Museum.
- (1964) "Contributions of Marius Barbeau to West Coast Ethnology." Anthropologica (new series), vol. 6, no. 1, pp. 63–96.
- (1964) The Indian History of British Columbia: Volume 1 The Impact of the Whiteman. BC Provincial Museum

== Sources ==
- Abbott, Donald N. (ed.) (1981) The World Is as Sharp as a Knife: An Anthology in Honour of Wilson Duff. Victoria: British Columbia Provincial Museum.
- Nowry, Laurence (1995) Marius Barbeau, Man of Mana: A Biography. Toronto: NC Press.
