= Grace Wilson Melvin =

Scottish-Canadian artist, teacher, and academic professional

Nancy Jane Burton
- Born: 28 May 1892; Glasgow, Scotland
- Died: March 8, 1977 (aged 84)
- Education: Glasgow School of Art
- Awards: Lauder Prize, 1927
- Elected: Glasgow Society of Lady Artists

Grace Wilson Melvin (1892/1896 - 1977) was a Scottish-Canadian artist, teacher, and academic professional who was born in Glasgow. According to most sources, Melvin's date of birth was May 28, 1892; however, some sources state the year as 1896. The Scotland's People website confirms 1892 is the date. Melvin has been noted as one of two women who were responsible for bringing modern calligraphy designs to Canada (the other being Esme Davis). She won the Lauder Prize in 1927.

== Education ==
Melvin began studying art at the Glasgow School of Art in 1907. She took classes in drawing, painting, and design, while also attending life classes. Her work was influenced by the Art Nouveau period in which she was creating, which had Pre-Raphaelite influences. Melvin studied under the guidance of Robert Anning Bell, Maurice Grieffenhager, Charles Rennie Mackintosh, Caley Robinson, and Ann MacBeth. She graduated with honours in 1916 and received a post-graduate diploma with honours in 1918. Melvin discovered her passion for illumination whilst studying on scholarship to London's British Museum, and was given special permission to recreate some of the works.

== Career ==
Melvin ended her studies at the Glasgow School of Art in 1918 and became a faculty member in 1920. Courses that she taught, between 1920 and 1927, included:

- Lettering and Illumination (under Design and Decorative Art) (1920/1921)
- Lettering and Illumination (under Pictorial Design and methods of production) (1926/1927)
- History of Lettering and Illumination (1926/1927)

Melvin also worked as a scribe for the Corporation of Glasgow, making illuminated addresses for significant people. She traveled to Vancouver, B.C., in 1927 for a two-year leave of absence from the Glasgow School of Art to help organize the Design Department at the Vancouver Art School. According to the Canadian Women Artists History Initiative, Melvin came to Canada at the request of her brother-in-law Charles H. Scott. However, there is seemingly no further mention of him in her life nor of any involvement in the Vancouver Art School. There, Melvin accepted a full-time position as the Head of the Design Department in 1929. She was interested in First Nations art and encouraged her students to use such art for inspiration in their own work. She retired from the Vancouver Art School in 1952 and became a full-time painter, while also publishing and illustrating numerous books. Her main passion was lettering and illumination, but she also created many landscape, garden and urban coastal scenes. The mediums that Melvin worked in included watercolor, oil, and ink.

== Publications and art work ==
One of Melvin's most notable works is the Books of Remembrance for the Canadian Engineers of World War I that she created, which is on display in St Paul's Cathedral in London, England. She completed illustrations for many books by Marius Barbeau, including "The Indian Speaks" from 1943, and "Le Rêve de Kamalmouk" from 1948. Her book titled Basic Lettering for Art Students from 1930 is reportedly still used in instruction today. She had many books commissioned for the Department of Education of British Columbia, including the Student Manual and Workbook from 1949 and the Teacher's Manual: Containing in Full 'the Student Manual and Workbook' with a Suggested Approach.

== Final years ==
Grace Wilson Melvin died in Vancouver, B.C., on March 8, 1977.
