= Eugenia Berlin =

Canadian artist (1905–2003)

- Born: Eugenia Berlin; 30 April 1905; Kharkov, Russian Empire
- Died: 2003 (aged 97–98); Toronto, Ontario, Canada
- Known for: Sculpture
- Notable work: "Dr. Marius Barbeau", "Fawn" and "Mourning Doves"
- Movement: Post Modern
- Awards: Honorary academician of The Canadian Portrait Academy 2000

Eugenia Berlin (1905–2003) was a Russian-born Canadian sculptor, painter, designer and director.

== Biography ==
=== Education and training ===
Berlin was born in Kharkov, Russian Empire and immigrated to Toronto, Ontario, Canada in 1925. She studied sculpture, drawing, and design at the L'Ecole des Beaux Arts in Geneva, Switzerland under James Vibert and Valentine Métein-Gilliard and privately under William Métein. She attended Central Technical School in Toronto, studying under Elizabeth Wyn Wood and Bobs Coghill Haworth. At the Chouinard School of Art, Berlin studied under Alexander Archipenko and attended the Alexander Archipenko School in New York City. Berlin's primary discipline was sculpture but she also worked in mixed media, pottery, watercolour, and painting.

She practised, and was friends, with some of the pre-eminent artists in Canadian history: Emanuel Hahn, Elizabeth Wyn Wood, Jacobine Jones, Frances Loring and Florence Wyle, as well as artists that included Albert Jacques Franck, EB Cox, AJ Casson, Paraskeva Clark, Harold Town, AY Jackson, JWG Macdonald and Doris McCarthy.

=== Exhibitions ===
Berlin exhibited at the National Art Gallery of Canada, Royal Canadian Academy, Montreal Museum of Fine Arts, London Regional Art Gallery, Art Gallery of Hamilton, Art Gallery of Toronto, Hart House at the University of Toronto, UNESCO Exhibition of Canadian Art in Paris 1946, Toronto Winter Fair, King City Public Library (solo exhibition); Eaton's Art Gallery, Roberts Gallery (1959), J.M. Dent and Sons, and the Canadian Portrait Academy.

=== Private life ===
Berlin was of Jewish descent and classified her occupations as 'teacher' and 'social worker' in a Canadian and U.S. Border Crossing Declaration in 1943. She remained single her entire life and lived with her brother, the noted Russian-Canadian composer and musician Boris Berlin, at Ferndale Ave, Toronto, then at 341 Bloor Street. Towards the end of her life Berlin lived at Seven Oaks, a long-term care home located at 9 Neilson Road, Toronto.

=== Career and honours ===
Berlin won a prize at the Toronto Winter Fair for her outdoor garden sculpture and two animal figures which were reproduced in "Canadian Art."

During Berlin's forty year plus career she was appointed Director of the Saturday Morning Club at the Royal Ontario Museum, a position she held until her retirement.

In 2000 Berlin was honoured by the Canadian Portrait Academy as honorary academician.

=== Collections ===
Berlin is represented with sculptures in the National Gallery of Canada with her portrait of Dr. Marius Barbeau and in the Corbet Collection of Canadian Women Artists with "Mourning Doves".
