= Metlakatla First Nation =

- Band No. 673
- People: Tsimshian
- Headquarters: Metlakatla
- Province: British Columbia

Land
- Main reserve: S1/2 Tsimpsean 2
- Land area: 77.4 km^{2} (29.9 sq mi)

Population (2024)
- On reserve: 94
- On other land: 19
- Off reserve: 988
- Total population: 1101

Government
- Chief: Robert Nelson

Tribal Council
- Tsimshian First Nations

Website
- www.metlakatla.ca

Metlakatla First Nation is a band government based at Metlakatla on the North Coast of British Columbia, Canada, to the north of the city of Prince Rupert. They are a member of the Tsimshian First Nations treaty council.

== Chief and Councillors ==
Position	Name	Term start	Term end	Reference
Chief	Harold Leighton	June 15, 2007	May 31, 2010	

== BC Treaty Process ==
In the British Columbia Treaty Process, the Metlakatla First Nation in Stage 5.

== Demographics ==
Band number 673, the Metlakatla First Nation has 1,101 members.

== DNA testing ==
In 2013, anthropologists from the US and Canada conducted a mitochondrial DNA mapping study on the 5,500-year-old remains of a woman found on Lucy Island, B.C., and conclusively determined that she had genetic links with living relatives from the Metlakatla Nation: proving that the Metlakatla have been living in the region for over 200 generations.

In November 2016, a study published in Nature Communications linked the genome of 25 Indigenous people who inhabited modern-day Prince Rupert, British Columbia 1000 to 6000 years ago with their descendants in the Metlakatla First Nation. The study validated the oral history of the Metlakatla, which had maintained their presence in the region for thousands of years.
