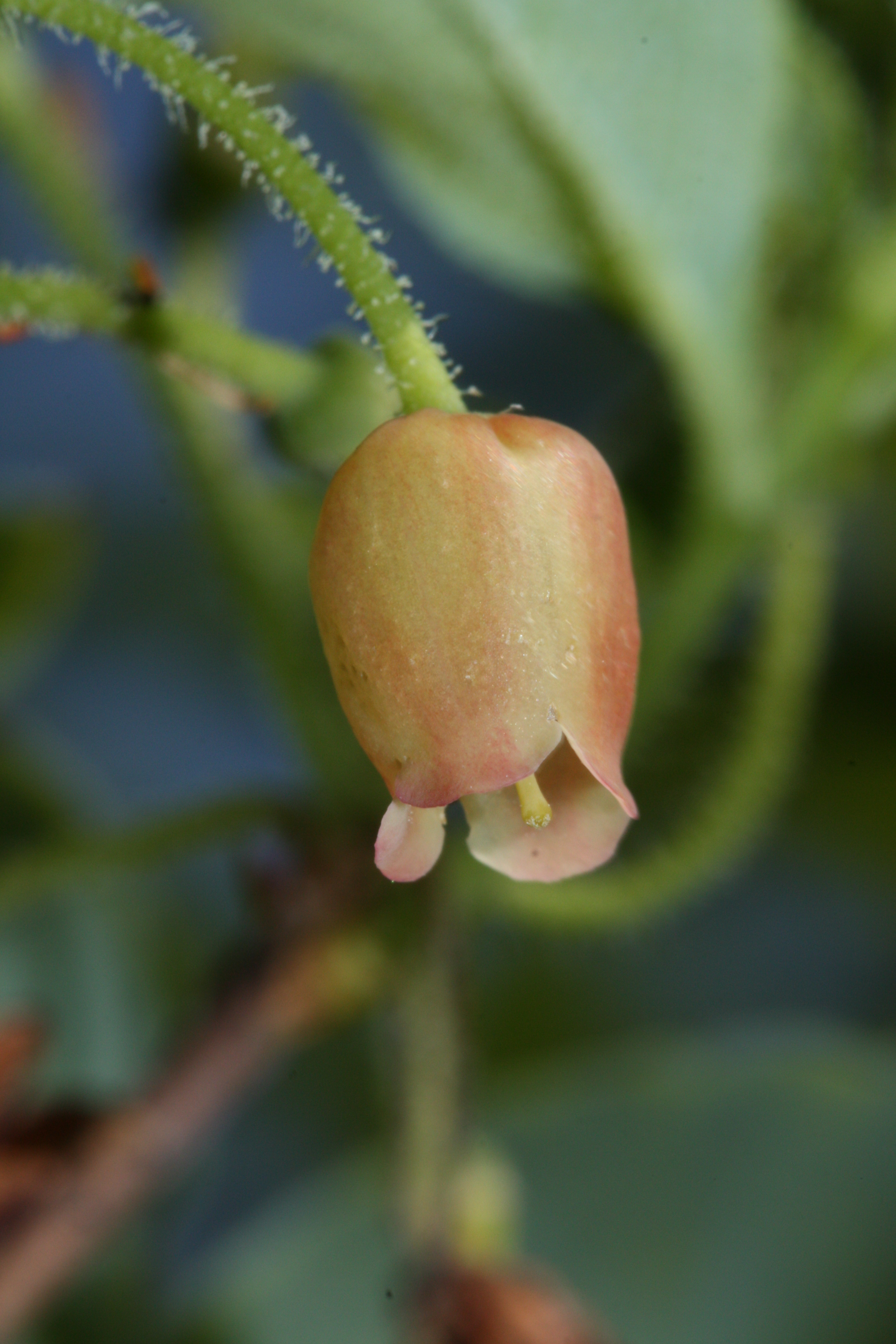

Scientific classification
- Kingdom: Plantae
- Clade: Tracheophytes
- Clade: Angiosperms
- Clade: Eudicots
- Clade: Asterids
- Order: Ericales
- Family: Ericaceae
- Genus: Rhododendron
- Species: R. menziesii

Binomial name
- Rhododendron menziesii Craven

Synonyms
- Menziesia ferruginea Sm.

= Rhododendron menziesii =

Rhododendron menziesii (Menziesia ferruginea)

Species of plant

Rhododendron menziesii, also classified as Menziesia ferruginea, is a species of flowering plant in the heath family Ericaceae, known by several common names, including rusty menziesia, false huckleberry, fool's huckleberry and mock azalea.

== Description ==
Rhododendron menziesii is a mostly erect or spreading shrub often exceeding 3 metres (9.8 ft) in height, and reaching lower heights at higher elevations.

Its branches are coated in thin, scaly, shreddy bark and its twigs with fine glandular hairs.

The alternately arranged deciduous leaves are oval in shape with pointed tips, reaching 4 to 6 centimeters long. The leaves are hairy, glandular, and sticky in texture, and have an unpleasant skunklike odor when crushed.

The inflorescence is a loose cluster of hanging bell- or cup-shaped flowers in shades of pink to orange to yellow-green. The flower has 4 to 5 petals which are mostly fused into a cylinder, and eight stamens inside. The bloom period is June and July.

The fruit is a valved capsule under a centimeter long which contains many seeds.

== Distribution and habitat ==
The shrub is native to northwestern North America from Alaska through the Pacific Northwest to northwestern California and Wyoming.

It is a member of the flora in mountain forests. It grows in the understory of subalpine fir (Abies lasiocarpa), Pacific silver fir (A. amabilis), Coast redwood (Sequoia sempervirens), western redcedar (Thuja plicata), western hemlock (Tsuga heterophylla), and other conifers.

The plant prefers cold, wet, densely vegetated habitats where it can grow in deep shade.

== See also ==
- Flora of the West Coast of the United States
- Flora of the Cascade Range
