= Kitselas, British Columbia =

Kitselas
- railway point
- Location of Kitselas in British Columbia
- Coordinates: 54°33′59″N 128°27′05″W
- Country: Canada
- Province: British Columbia
- Region: Skeena
- Regional district: Kitimat–Stikine
- Time zone: UTC-8 (PST)
  - Summer (DST): UTC-7 (PDT)
- Area codes: 250, 778, 236, & 672
- Waterways: Skeena River

Kitselas is a railway point on the northwestern shore of the Skeena River in the Skeena region of west central British Columbia, Canada. The former name was Vanarsdol. Across the Skeena to the southwest is the mouth of the Zymoetz River (commonly called the Copper River). This river bridge on BC Highway 16 is by road about 10 kilometres (6 mi) northeast of Terrace.

== Railway ==
The Grand Trunk Pacific Railway (GTP) surveyors considered two routes between present day Telkwa and this vicinity. One was via the Telkwa and Zymoetz rivers and the other was via the Bulkley River and Hazelton. Although the former was 129 kilometres (80 mi) shorter, the BC government influenced the decision to select the latter.

In early November 1910, the eastward advance of the GTP rail head from Prince Rupert passed through mile 100 (Vanarsdol), reaching Newtown at mile 102 (western end of the tunnels), where it halted for over a year. After Foley, Welch and Stewart (FW&S), the GTP prime contractor, handed over control of the line west of Vanarsdol to the GTP (which commenced scheduled service in June 1911), the construction work east of that point was regarded as the ongoing extension. In mid-January 1912, the FW&S Newtown temporary terminal ceased to exist when tracklaying proceeded through the tunnels.

Vanarsdol station was named after Cassius Cash Van Arsdol, GTP chief engineer. His directive to the route surveyors, especially for the Canadian Rockies segment, was to ensure the grade did not to exceed four-tenths of one percent. Consequently, his nickname thereafter was "Four-tenths Van".

By 1911, the Copper River siding existed. The planned station locations in the vicinity had been Kitsum, Copper River, and Kitselas. Stations quickly eventuated at Littleton (Terrace) (but not Kitsum just to the west) and at Vanarsdol (rather than opposite old Kitselas (Kitselas Canyon), but not for the Copper River siding at Stewart's Landing. Later that decade, the latter opened as the Dobies station.

In the 1936 flood, the Canadian National Railway (CN) pumphouse stopped working and the foundations of the railway depot and water tower were so badly undercut, that the structures were overhanging the river.

Train Timetables (Regular stop or Flag stop)
	Mile	1914	1920	1925	1932	1935	1943	1950	1956	1960	1965	1970	1974	1975	1980	1985	1988	1989
Terrace	1663.3	Reg.	Reg.	Reg.	Reg.	Reg.	Reg.	Reg.	Reg.	Reg.	Reg.	Reg.	Reg.	Reg.	Reg.	Reg.	Reg.	Reg.
Dobies	1659.0		Flag	^{a}	Flag	Flag	Flag	Flag	Flag									
Vanarsdol	1657.7	Flag	Flag	Flag	Flag	Reg.												
Kitselas	1657.7						Flag	Flag	Flag	Flag	Flag	Flag	Flag					
Mileage 125.7	1657.2													Flag	Flag	Flag	Flag	
Usk	1650.7	Flag	Flag	Reg.	Reg.	Reg.	Both	Reg.	Reg.	Reg.	Flag	Flag	Flag	Flag	Flag	Flag	Flag	Flag
Royal Lumber	1646.4		Flag															
Pitman	1644.0	Flag	Flag	Flag	Flag	Flag	Flag	Flag	Flag	Flag	Flag	Flag	Flag	Flag	Flag			
Pacific	1638.5	Reg.	Reg.	Reg.	Reg.	Reg.	Reg.	Reg.	Reg.	Flag	Flag	Flag	Flag	Flag	Flag	Flag	Flag	Flag

^a. A flag stop from at least 1918, which continued throughout the 1920s.

== Newtown ==
Newtown referred to the temporary railway terminal vicinity on the west shore. This more significant construction camp is best regarded as a general area rather than a specific place. In 1911, Frank Bowness opened a restaurant and bunkhouse, which unlikely survived much beyond that year.

The earlier use of Newtown to designate a First Nation reserve could refer to either the Kitselas 1 or Kshish 4 or both.

== Kitselas (formerly Vanarsdol) ==
This location on the northwest side of the Skeena is surrounded by the Kitselas Kshish First Nation Reserve 4. The First Nations school, which existed 1904–1959 at Vanarsdol, was initially administered by the Methodist mission. Fire destroyed the schoolhouse in 1933 and its vacant replacement in 2010.

The earliest newspaper mention of the Vanarsdol place name is June 1911. The post office existed 1913–1927.

About 1924, William Hagan opened the Vanarsdol Lumber Co and his wife Wilhelmina opened a general store, which contained the post office. In 1927, fire destroyed the Hagan sawmill, adjacent buildings, and 180,000 metres (600,000 ft) of lumber. A mention of the mill site as Copper City in 1928 is likely a reference to the general area.

In 1931, the rebuilt mill diversified into box making. Strawberry crops also thrived. The sawmill operated at least until the mid-1930s.

== Dobies ==
This location was on the northwest side of the Skeena, downstream from the Zymoetz River. In the 1890s, pioneer settlers John (David) Stuart and family arrived. On their homestead, they developed an exceptional orchard. Steamboats called at Stuart Landing for cordwood fuel. Simeon Wilson Dobbie came in 1898 and married Jemima Stuart in 1905. The Dobbies purchased part of the Stuart property in 1908, and the wharf became Dobbie Landing. Ferries, a railway flag stop, and a school have existed in the vicinity.

== Copper City ==
In 1908, William John Sanders, prospector and Sergeant-at-arms in the BC Legislature, chose the name of Copper City for the new townsite, which would occupy 118 hectares (292 acres) of his 523-hectare (1,292-acre) property immediately south of the Zymoetz River mouth. In 1909, a Prince Rupert syndicate paid $45,000 for over 40 hectares (100 acres) of the site for immediate marketing.

In 1907, Harry Creech opened a hotel. He was the inaugural Copper River postmaster 1909–1914 and also ran a general store. In 1909, a second general store opened, which Percy Ralph Skinner and his brother ran as a HBC agency.

In 1910, W.J. Sanders built a hotel. By 1913, no hotels operated. In 1915, the school opened. In 1929, a new schoolhouse was erected. The former one had been a small frame building with broken windows and no toilets. The one-room school stood in the Dobies area on the northwest side of the Skeena.

In the early 1930s, the only outside road link was with Terrace.

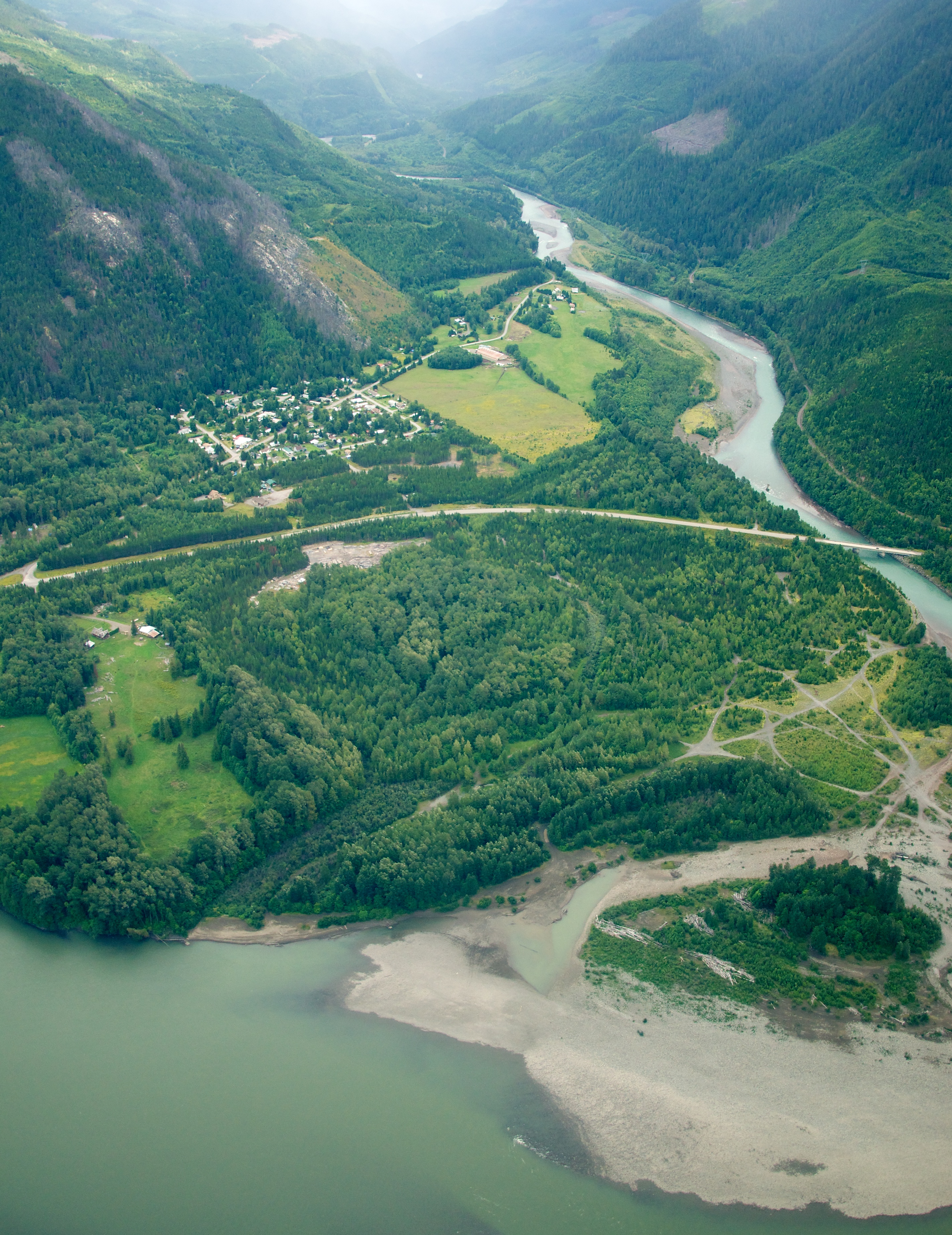
Eastward View of Copperside Estates, 2011.

In 1950, the school closed. The post office closed in 1956, and the Skinner family store existed at least until this time.

== Copperside Estates ==
About 1971, the Copperside Estates subdivision opened immediately north of the Zymoetz River mouth.

In 1994, the Copperside Stables were established.

In 2019, a hydraulic hose failed on a BC Hydro truck, resulting in a 10-to-15-litre (2.2 to 3.3 imp gal; 2.6 to 4.0 US gal) spill of hydraulic fluid in the area. The private Copper Estates water system provider advised the almost 400 residents to avoid using their water for about a week because the spill occurred close to a well. Boil water advisories prompted residents in 2021 to request the regional district take over the water supply system.

The current passenger transit provider is BC Transit.

== Ferries ==
=== Stewart Ferry across the Skeena ===
Stuart Landing (alternative spelling Stewart) was also a ferry location. Existing from the 1890s, Stewart's Ferry was different from the Copper River mouth locale, which suggests a positioning distinctly to the southwest. This ferry operated into the earlier years of the following century.

=== Copper City Ferry across the Skeena ===
In 1908, a subsidized two-year ferry charter covering 3.2 kilometres (2 mi) up and downstream was tendered. No evidence exists that any such service began. W.J. Saunders installed and commenced a reaction ferry in 1910. However, residents would have preferred the government operate the service.

The new 4.5-tonne; 4.5-long-ton (5-short-ton) ferry installed in 1923–24 was operated by residents rather than a government employee. The northwest ferry dock was in the general vicinity of Dobies station.

In 1933, an automobile overran the far end of the ferry while loading, and the three passengers inside drowned. In 1934, a new ferry operator residence was built. In 1938–39, two new landing pontoons were constructed.

During flooding in 1945, the ferry lost its northern landing pontoon. In 1947–48, a new 9.1-tonne; 8.9-long-ton (10-short-ton) ferry with steel pontoons was installed.

In 1950, spring floods damaged the ferry. During winters, a rowboat was employed. When the ice thickness was sufficient, an ice crossing served pedestrians.

Around 1969, the ferry was discontinued, which ended road access to Kitselas.

=== Lower Copper River Ferry ===
By the 1920s, a cable crossing existed 5 to 6 kilometres (3 to 4 mi) from the river mouth. It is unclear if the basket ferry operating at least 1927–1934 was at this or another location.

About 3 kilometres (2 mi) from the mouth, a one-lane bridge dating from the early 1910s was replaced in 1929.

=== Upper Copper River Ferry ===
About 45 kilometres (28 mi) from the mouth, an aerial passenger ferry existed in 1914, which was upgraded to a ferry in 1921.

== Maps ==
- Kitsalas complete map. 1914.
- Resources near Terrace cropped map. 1925.
- "Standard Oil BC map". www.davidrumsey.com. 1937.
- "Shell BC map". www.davidrumsey.com. 1956.
