= Tsimshian First Nations =

Treaty council in British Columbia, Canada

Tsimshian First Nations is a treaty council based on the British Columbia Coast near Kitimat, British Columbia, Canada.

== Membership ==
The Tsimshian First Nations treaty council is made up of four band governments including:

First Nation Number	First Nation Name
675	Gitga'at First Nation
680	Kitselas First Nation
681	Kitsumkalum First Nation
673	Metlakatla First Nation

== BC Treaty Process ==
In the British Columbia Treaty Process, the treaty council is at Stage 4.
