= William Beynon =

Canadian historian (1888–1958)

- Gusgai'in
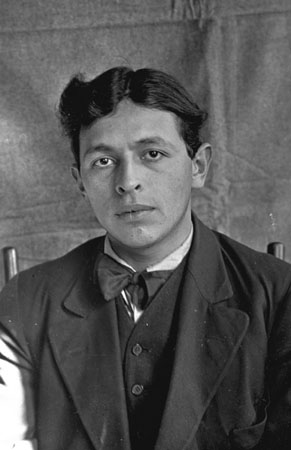
- William Beynon in 1915
- Born: 1888
- Died: 1958 (aged 69–70)
- Occupations: Ethnographer, translator, linguist, oral historian
- Known for: Anthropological studies of Tsimshian people
- Relatives: Arthur Wellington Clah (grandfather)

William Beynon (1888–1958), also known as Gusgai'in or Gusgain, was a Canadian hereditary chief of the Tsimshian Nation and an oral historian. He served as an ethnographer, translator, and linguistic consultant to many anthropologists who studied his people.

== Early life and education ==
Beynon was born in 1888 in Victoria, British Columbia to a Tsimshian woman of Nisga'a ancestry and "Captain Billy" Beynon, a Welsh steamboat captain. He was also known as Gusgai'in or Gusgain, which Barbara J. Winter said is a Tlingit name meaning "High Cliff" whereas Derek G. Smith said it is a Tsimshian name. Beynon's mother only spoke to him in Tsimshian and educated him on Tsimshian traditions and rituals.

Although some sources describe Beynon as being Nisga'a or matrilineally Nisga'a, his ancestry was more complicated by the colonial interpretation of long standing relationships between nations. Beynon's maternal line descends from members of the Laxgibuu (Wolf clan) of the Nisga'a nation. Members of his line had moved from the Nass River to Lax Kw'alaams, British Columbia, coincidentally after nearly the entire mission village of Metlakatla, BC migrated in 1887 to Metlakatla, Alaska following the lay missionary William Duncan. The mission had members from many tribes including the Gitlaan tribe. Beynon's maternal grandfather was Arthur Wellington Clah, a hereditary Tsimshian chief and a Hudson's Bay Company employee. The Gitlaan tribe is one of the "Nine Tribes" whose Chiefs happened to be at Fort Simpson (later Port Simpson, later Lax Kw'alaams) when the Indian agent designated the location as one of the seven Tsimshian Indian reserve communities.

William Beynon was the only one of six brothers to be raised fluent in the Tsimshian language. When his mother's only surviving brother, Albert Wellington, died in 1913, William Beynon moved from Victoria to Lax Kw'alaams at the age of 25 to assume his uncle's hereditary title, Gwisk'aayn. This was in accordance with Tsimshian rules of matrilineal succession, and he served as hereditary chief of the Gitlaan tribe until his own death.

== Career ==
Beginning in 1914, Beynon was hired as a translator and transcriber by the anthropologist Marius Barbeau, then in the employ of the Geological Survey of Canada. Barbeau and Beynon's series of interviews with Lax Kw'alaams chiefs and elders in 1914-15 has been called by the anthropologist Wilson Duff "one of the most productive field seasons in the history of [North] American anthropology." In 1916 Beynon continued the same type of work, on his own, with the Tsimshian of Kitkatla, B.C. This field trip was marred by a measles epidemic among the people, causing high mortality. In addition, Benyon was shipwrecked for ten days on an uninhabited island with Chief Seeks of the Kitkatla tribe.

As Beynon increased his facility with phonetic transcription and knowledge of his own people's traditions—which, as a formerly assimilated urbanite, he was quickly learning—he began to work more and more under his own direction. In the 1920s he worked with Barbeau with elders from the Kitsumkalum and Kitselas Tsimshian and the Gitksan nation, in and around Terrace, British Columbia.

From 1918 to 1924, Beynon worked extensively up and down the coast, collecting museum artifacts for Sir Henry Wellcome, executor of the estate of William Duncan, the missionary founder of Metlakatla, Alaska. Beynon spent considerable time there as Wellcome's local representative.

From 1929 until 1956, when Beynon became ill, he continued to send Barbeau his own fieldnotes, covering every conceivable aspect of the culture and traditions of the Tsimshian, Gitksan, and Nisga'a peoples. He carefully recorded oral narratives. His tour de force was a 200-page description of a four-day potlatch and totem-pole-raising feast in 1945 in the Gitksan village of Gitsegukla. This has recently been issued in book form.

In 1931, Beynon was one of the four founding members of the Native Brotherhood of British Columbia, an indigenous-rights organization founded in Lax Kw'alaams. The Native Brotherhood was instrumental in securing the rights for Natives to vote, among many of their advocacy roles.

From 1932 to 1939 Beynon sent the anthropologist Franz Boas approximately 250 transcribed narratives. These are known as the "Beynon Manuscripts," and are held by the Rare Book & Manuscript Library at Columbia University, New York.

In the early 1930s Beynon facilitated the Lax Kw'alaams fieldwork of Viola Garfield, a doctoral student of Boas. Many pages of Garfield's voluminous field notebooks are filled out in Beynon's handwriting. Their work was the basis of Garfield's PhD dissertation and first book.

In 1953 Beynon worked with the anthropologist Philip Drucker, of the Smithsonian Institution. For Drucker, Beynon wrote his own, as yet unpublished, synthesis of the complex lineage histories of the Tsimshianic-speaking peoples.

Beynon died in 1958 in Prince Rupert, B.C. Although he had no formal training in anthropology and supported himself for most of his life in the canning and fishing industries, he worked as a field ethnographer for Boas, Sapir, and Barbeau across four decades, leaving several thousand pages of Tsimshian texts and genealogical records.

== Legacy ==
The Barbeau-Beynon Collection at the Canadian Museum of History had Beynon’s name subsequently added to acknowledge his contributions to this archive of work about the Tsimshian people. This collection helps Indigenous peoples of the Pacific Northwest Coast today in researching their traditional territories, land-use patterns, and oral traditions. Particular indigenous groups featured in this archive include the Tsimshian, Gitxsan, Wet'suwet'en, Nisga'a, Haida, Tlingit, Haisla, Kwakwakaʼwakw, Tahltan, Dakelh, and Coast Salish.

Linguists Tonya Stebbins and Birgit Hellwig describe digitizing Beynon’s manuscripts as a potentially important tool to revitalize Sm'algya̱x, the Coast Tsimshian dialect of the Tsimshian language.

Beynon's papers are held at the American Philosophical Society in Philadelphia.

In February 2023, four reels of microfilm containing Beynon's work were found at Tea Creek Farm in Kitwanga, British Columbia, Canada. This discovery was described as a "de facto repatriation" because Tea Creek Farm is owned by Jacob Beaton, who is Tsimshian.

== Works ==
- Anderson, Margaret Seguin, and Marjorie Halpin (eds.) (2000) Potlatch at Gitsegukla: William Beynon's 1945 Field Notebooks. Vancouver: UBC Press.
- Beynon, William (1941) "The Tsimshians of Metlakatla, Alaska." American Anthropologist (new series), vol. 43, pp. 83–88.
- Beynon, William (1999) "Nda ckshun Tckaimsom dis Laggabula -- When Tckaimson and Laggabula Gambled." In: Alaska Native Writers, Storytellers & Orators: The Expanded Edition, ed. by Ronald Spatz, Jeane Breinig, and Patricia H. Partnow, pp. 44–47. Anchorage: University of Alaska.
- MacDonald, George F., and John J. Cove (eds.) (1987) Tsimshian Narratives. Collected by Marius Barbeau and William Beynon. (Canadian Museum of Civilization Mercury Series, Directorate Paper 3.) 2 vols. Ottawa: Directorate, Canadian Museum of Civilization.

== Sources ==
- "B.C. Indian Authority Dies" (obituary for William Beynon). Vancouver, B.C., Province, February 11, 1958, p. 28.
- Cove, John J. (1985) A Detailed Inventory of the Barbeau Northwest Coast Files. (National Museum of Man Mercury Series, Canadian Centre for Folk Culture Studies, Paper 54.) Ottawa: National Museums of Canada.
- Duff, Wilson (1964) "Contributions of Marius Barbeau to West Coast Ethnology." Anthropologica (new series), vol. 6, no. 1, pp. 63–96.
- Garfield, Viola E. (1939) "Tsimshian Clan and Society." University of Washington Publications in Anthropology, vol. 7, no. 3, pp. 167–340.
- Halpin, Marjorie M. (1978) "William Beynon, Ethnographer, Tsimshian, 1888-1958." In American Indian Intellectuals: 1976 Proceedings of the American Ethnological Society, ed. by Margot Liberty, pp. 140–156. St. Paul: West Publishing Company.
- Nowry, Laurence (1995) Marius Barbeau, Man of Mana: A Biography. Toronto: N.C. Press.
