= Ecstall River =

Tributary of the Skeena River, BC, Canada

- Mouth of Ecstall River

Location
- Country: Canada
- Province: British Columbia
- District: Range 5 Coast Land District

Physical characteristics
- Source: Ecstall Headwaters Conservancy
  - location: Coast Mountains
  - coordinates: 53°56′4″N 129°22′57″W
  - elevation: 800 m (2,600 ft)
- Mouth: Skeena River
  - location: Port Essington
  - coordinates: 54°9′57″N 129°57′30″W
  - elevation: 20 m (66 ft)
- Length: 110 km (68 mi)
- Basin size: 1,485 km^{2} (573 sq mi)

The Ecstall River is a tributary of the Skeena River in the province of British Columbia, Canada. It originates in the Kitimat Ranges, and flows about 110 km (68 mi) to the lower tidal reach of the Skeena River at Port Essington, about 30 km (19 mi) southeast of Prince Rupert, 95 km (59 mi) southwest of Terrace, and 85 km (53 mi) northwest of Kitimat. Its drainage basin covers about 1,485 km^{2} (573 sq mi) and contains the largest blocks of unlogged land on the north coast of British Columbia, although large-scale industrial logging operations, both active and proposed, have been occurring in the watershed since the 1980s.

The name "Ecstall" comes from a Tsimshian word meaning "something from the side" or "a tributary".

The Ecstall River watershed is in Tsimshian First Nations territory. The Gitzaxłaał Tsimshian had two main seasonal villages in the watershed: Spiksuut, at the river's mouth where Port Essington is now, and Txalmisso', at Big Falls Creek. Salmon was caught in weirs or by spear. Other fish, marine invertebrates, and sea mammals were also harvested. Eulachon was probably the most important non-salmonid resource fished. Eulachon oil was an important trade item. There was a major aboriginal trail, or grease trail, linking the lower Skeena River and Douglas Channel. It ran through the Ecstall Valley, along the river, by Ecstall Lake, over a pass to the Quaal River valley, and down that river to the Kitkiata Inlet of Douglas Channel.

There are two hydroelectric projects in the Ecstall River's watershed. The Falls River Project was built in the 1930s and acquired by BC Hydro in 1964. It consists of a dam, two penstocks, a 7 MW nominal power plant, and 27 km (17 mi) of transmission line running along the east side of the Ecstall River, across the Skeena River, and on to Prince Rupert. The Brown Lake Project was built in 1997 for Synex Energy Resources Ltd, a subsidiary of Synex International, and is now owned by Innergex Renewable Energy. It consists of a dam near the outlet of Brown Lake and a 600 m (2,000 ft) tunnel to a powerhouse near sea level, which generates 7.2 MW. Electricity is delivered to the BC Hydro power grid via a submarine cable and a connection to the transmission line on the east side of the Ecstall River.

== Course ==
The Ecstall River originates in the Kitimat Ranges of the Coast Mountains, flowing from glaciers and icefields in the Ecstall Headwaters Conservancy. The river flows east, then south through the Ecstall Headwaters Conservancy, then bends sharply to the north and northwest, reaching the Skeena River at Port Essington, near the mouth of the Skeena. Ecstall Island is located at the mouth of the Ecstall River, just east of Port Essington.

The Ecstall River collects many small tributary streams flowing from the high, glaciated mountains of the region. At its southernmost bend it is joined by waters flowing from Lower Lake and Ecstall Lake. Turning north the river flows along the east edge of the Ecstall-Sparkling Conservancy and the Ecstall-Spoksuut Conservancy. More tributaries join the Ecstall as it flows north, including Johnston Creek, Red Gulch Creek, Sparkling Creek, Muddy Creek, Big Falls Creek, Madeline Creek, McKnight Creek, Hayward Creek, Cuthbert Creek, and McDonald Creek. High peaks near the Ecstall River include Spokshute Mountain, Mount Morrison, Balmoral Peak, Cunningham Peak, Mount Dodge, and Mount Hayward, among many others.

The Ecstall River flows through the Indian reserves of Iakvas 68 and Knokmolks 67, of the Tsimshian Lax-kw'alaams First Nation. The Port Essington Indian Reserve, of the Tsimshian Kitsumkalum and Kitselas people, is located near the mouth of the Ecstall River.

== Natural history ==
The forests of the Ecstall watershed's valley bottoms and slopes up to about 400 m (1,300 ft) are dominated by old growth western hemlock, western red cedar, Sitka spruce, and amabilis fir. Higher elevations are dominated by mountain hemlock and amabilis fir, some spruce, red cedar, and yellow cedar, with an understory mostly composed of Alaska blueberry, false azalea, red huckleberry, and black huckleberry. The floodplains and alluvial areas support large spruce, hemlock, and deciduous trees, with an understory consisting principally of salmonberry, ferns, and devil's club. The floodplain above Muddy Creek is one of the richest and most diverse ecosystems on the northern coast of British Columbia.

Industrial logging in the Ecstall River's valley began in the 1980s. In the 21st century extensive logging is being conducted in the valleys of the Ecstall tributaries Hayward Creek, Carthew Creek, Big Falls Creek, and Brown Lake.

The Ecstall River is an important salmon spawning stream. It supports many species of salmonids, including sockeye salmon, coho salmon, chum salmon, Chinook salmon, pink salmon, steelhead trout, rainbow trout, Dolly Varden trout, mountain whitefish, and bull trout. Eulachon, which historically were harvested by Tsimshian people and traded via grease trails, spawn in the tidal portion of the Ecstall River.

== See also ==
- Ecstall Greenstone Belt
- List of rivers of British Columbia
