= George F. MacDonald =

Canadian anthropologist and museum director (1938–2020)

George F. MacDonald (July 4, 1938 – January 22, 2020) was a Canadian anthropologist and museum director who pioneered archaeological and ethnohistorical research on the Tsimshian and Gitksan and was the director of the Canadian Museum of Civilization from 1983 to 1998.

MacDonald was born in Cambridge, Ontario. A graduate of the University of Toronto (1961: B.A. (Honours) in Anthropology) and of Yale University (Ph.D. in anthropology), he is the author of several scholarly publications. He joined what was then called the Canadian Museum of Man in 1960 as Atlantic Provinces Archaeologist.

MacDonald oversaw the transition of the museum to its new facility in Gatineau, Quebec, and its reorientation to a more modern, populist form of exhibit. Inspired as much by the ideas of Marshall Mcluhan and Disney's Epcot Center as by other museums like the Smithsonian Institution, MacDonald's version of the museum included interactive displays, replicas, and an IMAX theatre.

== Early life and education ==
MacDonald was born in Cambridge, Ontario, and received his undergraduate degree in anthropology from the University of Toronto. He earned his Ph.D. from Yale University, focusing on the archaeology and anthropology of the Northwest Coast. While still in high school, he met his future wife, Joanne MacDonald, M.A., also an anthropologist, beginning a partnership that spanned over 65 years of shared academic and field pursuits.

== Career and Contributions ==
=== Archaeology and Fieldwork ===
MacDonald is widely recognized for his work on Haida Gwaii, particularly his research at the UNESCO World Heritage Site of SG̱ang Gwaay (Ninstints), and his seminal role in the excavation of the Debert Paleoindian site in Nova Scotia—one of the earliest known human habitations in Canada. His work at Debert in the 1960s helped establish a deeper time depth for Indigenous occupation in Eastern Canada.

He was among the first Canadian archaeologists to integrate ethnographic insight and Indigenous collaboration into archaeological interpretation, a legacy that continues in contemporary scholarship.

=== Repatriation and Indigenous Relations ===
MacDonald was a trailblazer in the repatriation of cultural heritage to Indigenous communities. His leadership helped return numerous sacred and ceremonial objects from national collections to their communities of origin. He maintained close relationships with Haida Elders and Chiefs, and was the only non-Haida ever awarded a copper shield—a profound honor in Haida culture traditionally reserved for high-ranking clan leaders.

He also worked in collaboration with Indigenous leaders in Oceania and Australia, supporting Indigenous curatorial practices and collaborative exhibitions. His contributions to respectful museum-Indigenous relations are now studied in university museum studies and Indigenous governance programs.

=== Academic career ===
MacDonald held academic appointments at several leading Canadian universities. He was an Adjunct Research Professor at Carleton University, Simon Fraser University, and the University of British Columbia, and was a visiting professor at McMaster University and Université Laval. In recognition of his scholarly contributions to anthropology and museology, he was awarded an honorary Doctor of Laws (LL.D.) from the University of Calgary in 1989.

=== Museum Innovation ===
MacDonald became Director of the Canadian Museum of Civilization in 1983 and redefined museum practice in Canada. Often referred to as "Dr. Disney", he believed that museums should be immersive, narrative-rich spaces that brought history to life for a wide audience—not just academics.He also was Chief Executive Officer of the Canadian Museums Corporation, the umbrella organization overseeing Canada's national museums, where he championed innovation in museum engagement, cultural representation, and international collaboration.His tenure saw the commissioning of groundbreaking architectural work by Indigenous architect Douglas Cardinal, whose organic design became emblematic of the museum's mission. Among MacDonald's most celebrated initiatives were:

- The Grand Hall, featuring a reconstructed Pacific Northwest Coast village with full-scale totem poles and clan houses.
- The creation of Canada's first Children's Museum, emphasizing experiential learning.
- One of the world's earliest IMAX/Omnimax theatres within a national museum.
- Making the Canadian Museum of Civilization one of the first museums in the world to launch an online presence, extending accessibility globally.

Under his leadership, the museum became the most visited in Canada and one of the most popular in the Western Hemisphere.

Internationally, he held several major leadership roles, including:

- Director of the Victoria Museum in Melbourne, Australia, MacDonald was director and led the planning, construction, and opening of the Melbourne Museum in Carlton Gardens—which officially opened in 2000 under his direction.
- Director of the Burke Museum in Seattle, Washington, where he advanced research and public programming in natural history and Indigenous cultures.
- Director of the Bill Reid Centre for Northwest Coast Art at Simon Fraser University in Vancouver, where he championed Indigenous cultural expression and helped foster scholarship, exhibitions, and educational outreach related to the legacy of Haida artist Bill Reid and broader Northwest Coast traditions.

=== UNESCO and International Work ===
MacDonald held several national and international appointments, including on the Canadian Commission for UNESCO. He contributed to the nomination and advisory work for several UNESCO World Heritage Sites, including:

- SG̱ang Gwaay (Ninstints), Haida Gwaii
- L’Anse aux Meadows (Viking settlement)
- Head-Smashed-In Buffalo Jump, Alberta

He also was on committees for the International Council of Museums (ICOM) and the World Archaeological Congress.

== Honors and Legacy ==
- Fellow, Royal Society of Canada
- Fellow, Royal Society of Australia
- Member, Canadian Commission for UNESCO
- Copper shield recipient, Haida Nation
- Founding director, Canadian Museum of Civilization
- Honorary Doctorate, University of Calgary
- In recognition of his transformative contributions to Canadian archaeology, museology, and cultural heritage, MacDonald was appointed a Member of the Order of Canada (CM) in 2006, one of the country's highest civilian honours.
- He was also awarded the Queen Elizabeth II Diamond Jubilee Medal in 2012, recognizing Canadians for significant contributions to their community or country.

== Selected publications ==
MacDonald authored over 100 scholarly articles and several books. Select publications include:

- Haida Monumental Art: Villages of the Queen Charlotte Islands (1983)
- Haida Art (1996)
- Ninstints: Haida World Heritage Site (1996)
- Tsimshian Narratives (with John J. Cove, 1987)
- Images of the Indians (1978)
- Museums in the Global Village (1996)

== Personal life ==
George and Joanne MacDonald lived and worked together across Canada and internationally. Their partnership spanned archaeological excavations, field research, and curatorial collaboration, forming one of Canada's most enduring anthropological legacies. They had two children, Christine and Grant who were raised in Cantley, Quebec, where the couple lived for 50 years.

== Works ==
- MacDonald, George F. (1983, 2015) Haida Monumental Art: Villages of the Queen Charlotte Islands. Vancouver: University of British Columbia Press.
- MacDonald, George F. (1996), Haida Art , University of Washington Press. ISBN 978-0295975610
- MacDonald, George F., and John J. Cove (eds.) (1987) Tsimshian Narratives. 2 vols. Ottawa: Directorate, Canadian Museum of Civilization.
