= Port Essington, British Columbia =

Former town in British Columbia, Canada

- Ghost town
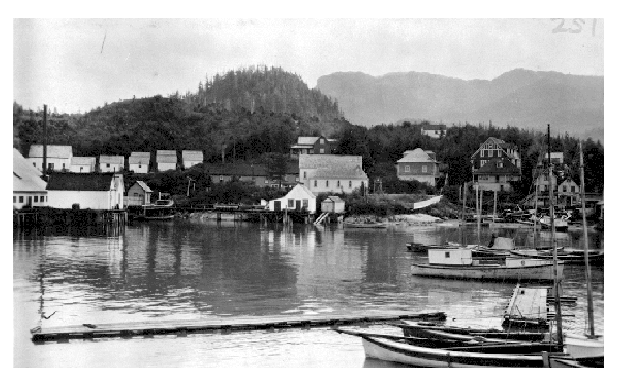
- Port Essington 1915

- Location of Port Essington in British Columbia
- Coordinates: 54°09′N 129°57′W
- Country: Canada
- Province: British Columbia
- District: Skeena-Queen Charlotte Regional District
- Founded: 1871

Population (2008)
  - Total: 0
  - Estimate (Peak): 1,000
- Time zone: UTC−07:00 (PT)

Port Essington was a cannery town on the south bank of the Skeena River estuary in northwestern British Columbia, Canada, between Prince Rupert and Terrace, and at the confluence of the Skeena and Ecstall Rivers. It was founded in 1871 by Robert Cunningham and Thomas Hankin (father of the interpreter Constance Cox) and was for a time the largest settlement in the region. During its heyday it was home to an ethnic mix of European-Canadians, Japanese-Canadians, and members of First Nations from throughout the region, especially Tsimshians from the Kitselas and Kitsumkalum tribes. In the Tsimshian language, the site of Port Essington is called Spaksuut or, in English spelling, "Spokeshute", which means "autumn camping place". This also became the Tsimshian name for the town of Port Essington, and was conferred on Spokeshute Mountain, which stands above and behind the community. It sits on the traditional territory of the Gitzaxłaał tribe, one of the nine Tsimshian tribes based at Lax Kw'alaams. In 1888, the anthropologist Franz Boas visited Port Essington, interviewing Haida and Tsimshian individuals and establishing a working relationship with Odille Morison, the Tsimshian linguist, who lived in Port Essington.

== History ==
In 1871, at the height of the Omineca Gold Rush, one route to the new goldfields led up the Skeena River to Hazelton, overland to Babine Lake and on to the Omineca River. The Provincial Government granted Robert Cunningham and Thomas Hankin the right to build a toll road from Hazelton to Babine Lake, while William Moore was placed in charge of the running pack mules on the trail. Cunningham and Hankin took out a pre-emption on the south bank of the Skeena River and set aside a portion of the property for the use of the local First Nations, while subdividing the rest for into lots which were sold to settlers. The Hudson's Bay Company bought three lots that summer and built a store that became known as the Skeena Post. In 1876 the first salmon cannery was built and by the turn of the century there were seven canneries near the estuary. Robert Cunningham built a hotel, a town hall as well as the first cold storage plant in the north, which began operating in 1892. The town had an active social life with dances, concerts and church activities as well as three hotels and a red-light district. However, despite the appearance of prosperity, the economy of Port Essington fluctuated with the seasons. Salmon fishing was a summer activity and the river was closed for freighting in the winter so many of the residents would migrate south each fall. According to Harris (see below), in the early twentieth century Port Essington's population fluctuated between around 1,000 and, in the winter months, about a quarter of that. The town was almost wiped out by fire in 1899, with only one building remaining. In January 1909, fire destroyed much of the town.

Port Essington's importance as a town began to wane when the Grand Trunk Pacific Railway along the Skeena was completed in 1914, on the opposite bank from Port Essington. Rail supplanted the riverboat commerce that had been the community's lifeblood. By the 1940s, all of Port Essington's canneries were inactive. Through the 1950s the population plummeted. Port Essington burned down in a series of fires in 1961 and 1965 and is now a ghost town (despite its continuing to appear as a populated settlement in many maps and atlases). It sits today on an Indian reserve jointly administered by the Kitselas and Kitsumkalum bands. Currently, there are attempts to shape what remains of Port Essington into a tourist attraction.

Captain Vancouver named it for Sir William Essington.

== Prominent residents ==
- Robert Cunningham, entrepreneur
- Odille Morison, Native linguist
- William Henry Pierce, missionary, author
- Walter Wright, hereditary chief, oral historian

== Bibliography ==
- Bowman, Phylis (1982) Klondike of the Skeena! Chilliwack, B.C.: Sunrise Printing.
- Harris, E. A. (1990) Spokeshute: Skeena River Memory. Victoria, B.C.: Orca Book Publishers.
- Large, R. Geddes (1957; reprinted, 1981) The Skeena: River of Destiny. Sidney, B.C.: Gray's Publishing.
- Pedelty, Donovan (1997) "Constance Cox." In Pioneer Legacy: Chronicles of the Lower Skeena River, Volume 1, ed. by Norma V. Bennett, pp. 227–230. Terrace, B.C.: Dr. R. E. M. Lee Hospital Foundation.
- Rohner, Ronald P. (1969) The Ethnography of Franz Boas: Letters and Diaries of Franz Boas Written on the North-West Coast from 1886 to 1931. Chicago: University of Chicago Press.
