= Marius Barbeau =

Canadian ethnographer

Charles Marius Barbeau
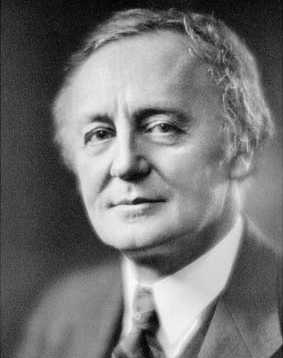
- Barbeau in 1942
- Born: March 5, 1883; S^{te}-Marie-de-Beauce (later Sainte-Marie, Quebec, Canada
- Died: February 27, 1969 (aged 85); Ottawa, Ontario, Canada
- Occupations: ethnographer, folklorist
- Awards: Order of Canada

Frédéric Charles Joseph Marius Barbeau CC FRSC (March 5, 1883 – February 27, 1969) was a Canadian ethnographer and folklorist who is today considered a founder of Canadian anthropology. A Rhodes Scholar, he is best known for an early championing of Québecois folk culture and for his exhaustive cataloguing of the social organization, narrative and musical traditions, and plastic arts of the Tsimshianic-speaking peoples in British Columbia (Tsimshian, Gitxsan, and Nisga'a), and other Northwest Coast peoples. He developed unconventional theories about the peopling of the Americas.

== Life and career ==
=== Youth and education ===
Frédéric Charles Joseph Marius Barbeau was born March 5, 1883, in Sainte-Marie, Quebec. In 1897, he began studies for the priesthood. He did his classical studies at Collège de Ste-Anne-de-la-Pocatière. In 1903 he changed his studies to a law degree at Université Laval, which he received in 1907. He went to England on a Rhodes Scholarship, studying at Oriel College, Oxford, from 1907 to 1910, where he began his studies in the new fields of anthropology, archeology and ethnography, under R. R. Marett. During the summers he would attend École des hautes études de la Sorbonne and École d'anthropologie. In Paris he would meet Marcel Mauss who would encourage him in his anthropological studies.

=== Field work ===
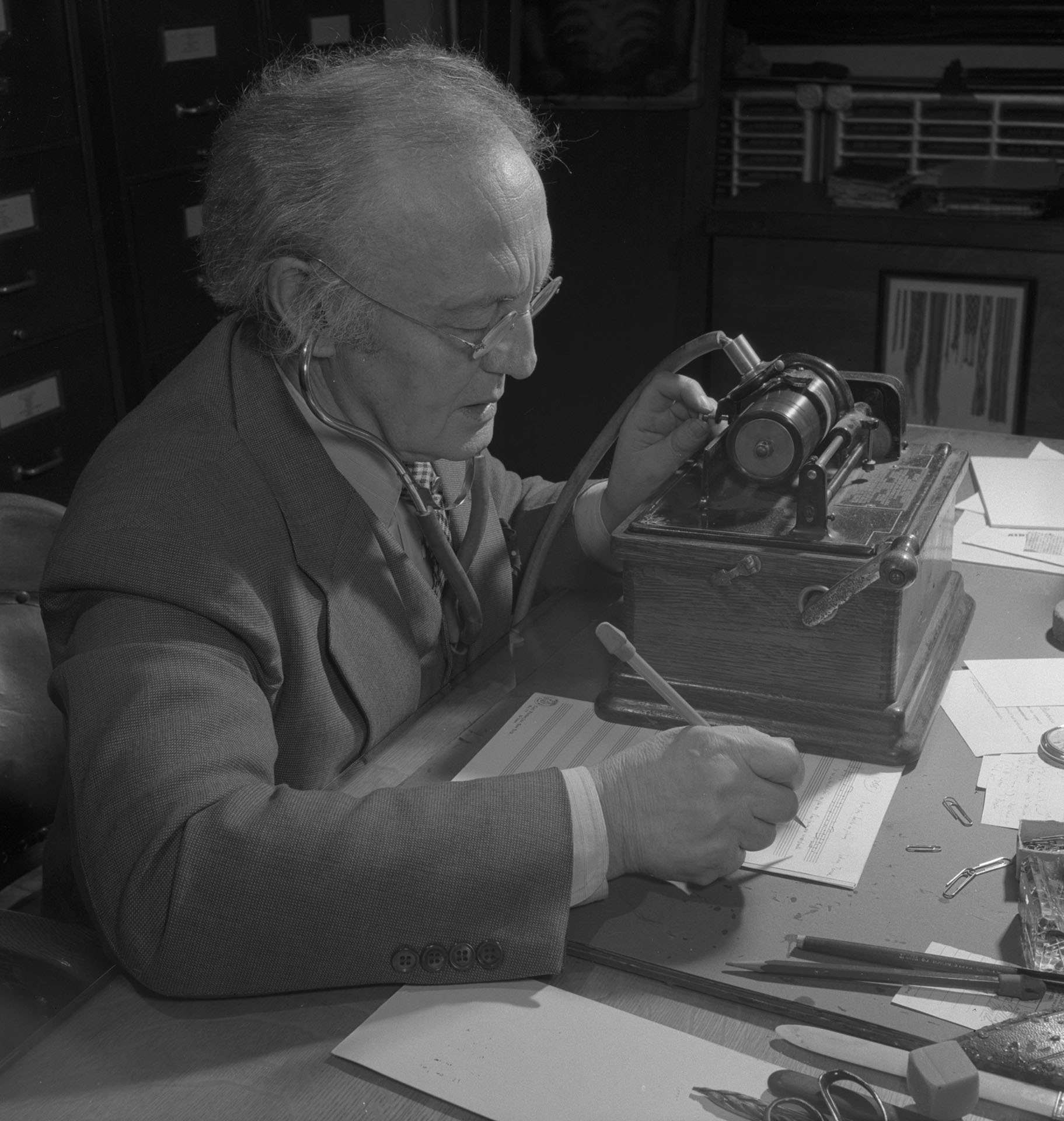
Marius Barbeau transcribing the melody of a folk song recorded on phonograph cylinder, 1949

In 1911, Barbeau joined the National Museum of Canada (then part of the Geological Survey of Canada) as an anthropologist under Edward Sapir. He worked there for his entire career, retiring in 1949. (The GSC subdivided in 1920. From that period, Barbeau was with the Victoria Memorial Museum, later renamed in 1927 as the National Museum of Canada.

At the beginning, he and Sapir were Canada's first and only two full-time anthropologists. Under those auspices, Barbeau began fieldwork in 1911–1912 with the Huron-Wyandot people around Quebec City, in southern Ontario, and on their reservation in Oklahoma, in the United States, collecting mostly stories and songs.

In 1913, the German-American anthropologist Franz Boas, then affiliated with the American Folklore Society (AFS), convinced Barbeau to specialize in French-Canadian folklore. Barbeau began collecting such material the following year. In 1918, Barbeau became president of the AFS.

In 1914, Barbeau married Marie Ernestine Larocque. They had a family together.

Beginning in December 1914, Barbeau carried out three months' fieldwork in Lax Kw'alaams (Port Simpson), British Columbia, the largest Tsimshian village in Canada. He collaborated with his interpreter, William Beynon, a Tsimshian hereditary chief. The anthropologist Wilson Duff (who in the late 1950s was entrusted by Barbeau with organizing the information) has called these three months "one of the most productive field seasons in the history of [North] American anthropology."

Barbeau and Beynon had a decades-long collaboration. Barbeau wrote an enormous volume of field notes—which are still mostly unpublished. Duff has characterized this as "the most complete body of information on the social organization of any Indian nation". Barbeau eventually trained Beynon in phonetic transcription, and the Tsimshian chief became an ethnological field worker in his own right. Barbeau and Beynon conducted field work in 1923–1924 with the Kitselas and Kitsumkalum Tsimshians and the Gitksan, who lived along the middle Skeena River. In 1927 and 1929, they had field seasons among the Nisga'a of the Nass River.

In 1929, Barbeau removed the Ni'isjoohl totem pole, hand-carved in the 1860s, from a Nisga'a village. The pole depicts the story of Ts'wawit, a warrior who was next in line to be chief before he was killed in a conflict with a neighbouring nation. The Nisga’a nation says the pole was taken by Barbeau without its consent while members were away from their villages for the annual hunting and food harvesting season, and it was later sold to the museum in Scotland. In August 2021, a delegation of Nisga'a leaders travelled to Edinburgh to request the transfer of the 11-metre pole back to their territory. The museum said its board of trustees approved the First Nation's request to transfer the pole to its home in northwest B.C. Chris Breward, the director of National Museums Scotland, said in a statement the institution is pleased to reach an agreement allowing the pole to be transferred to its people and the place where its spiritual significance is most keenly understood.

Barbeau is a controversial figure, as he was criticised for not accurately representing his Indigenous informants. In his anthropological work among the Tsimshian and Huron-Wyandot, for instance, Barbeau was solely looking for what he defined as "authentic" stories that were without political implications. Informants were often unwilling to work with him for various reasons. It is possible that the "educated informants," whom Barbeau advised his students to avoid, did not trust him to disseminate their stories.

=== Academic career ===
In 1942, Barbeau began lecturing at Laval and at the University of Ottawa. In 1945, he was made a professor at Laval. He retired in 1954 after suffering a stroke. He died February 27, 1969, in Ottawa.

==== Theories ====
Barbeau also did brief fieldwork with the Tlingit, Haida, Tahltan, Kwakwaka'wakw, and other Northwest Coast groups. He emphasized trying to synthesize the various migration traditions of these peoples in order to correlate them with the distribution of cultural traits. He was trying to reconstruct a sequence for the peopling of the Americas. He was an early champion of the theory of migration from Siberia across the Bering Strait. This narrative, while recognized as largely accurate by many anthropologists and geneticists, is still strongly disputed by many Indigenous nations who claim origin in North America.

His more controversial theory is that the Tsimshianic-speaking peoples, Haida, and Tlingit represented the most recent migration into the New World from Siberia. He believed that their ancestors were refugees from Genghis Khan's conquests, some as recently as a few centuries ago. In works such as the unpublished Migration Series manuscripts, the book Alaska Beckons, and numerous articles with such titles as "How Asia Used to Drip at the Spout into America" and "Buddhist Dirges on the North Pacific Coast", he eventually antagonized many of his contemporaries on this question. His thesis has been discredited by analysis of linguistic and DNA evidence.

Under Beynon's influence, Barbeau promoted the idea among western academics that the region's oral histories of migration have real historiographic value. They were long discounted because they did not conform to European traditions as accounts. Barbeau and Beynon's theory has been proven to have some merit when taken with evidence-based data such as climate, astronomical, and geological events.

Barbeau was an early proponent of recognizing totem poles as world-class high art, though his opinion that they were a post-contact artistic development has been decisively disproved.

=== Ethnomusicology ===
Barbeau's primary contribution to ethnomusicology was primarily around collection. He was interested in music from a young age, receiving musical education from his mother. Through his career, he would be concerned with music's influence on anthropology. He would be named one of the first Canadian ethnomusicologists

Barbeau was concerned with having all Canadians experience folk music. He often used trained Canadian musicians as folk music performers to bring the music to a wider audience. He received minor criticism for utilizing an American singer, Loraine Wyman.

In 1915, Barbeau would initiate the Museum collection of French-Canadian songs. Later in 1916, he set off on a recording expedition along the St. Lawrence River. His objective was to record every French Canadian folk song. He returned with notation for over 500 songs and some folk legends.

== Recognition and legacy ==
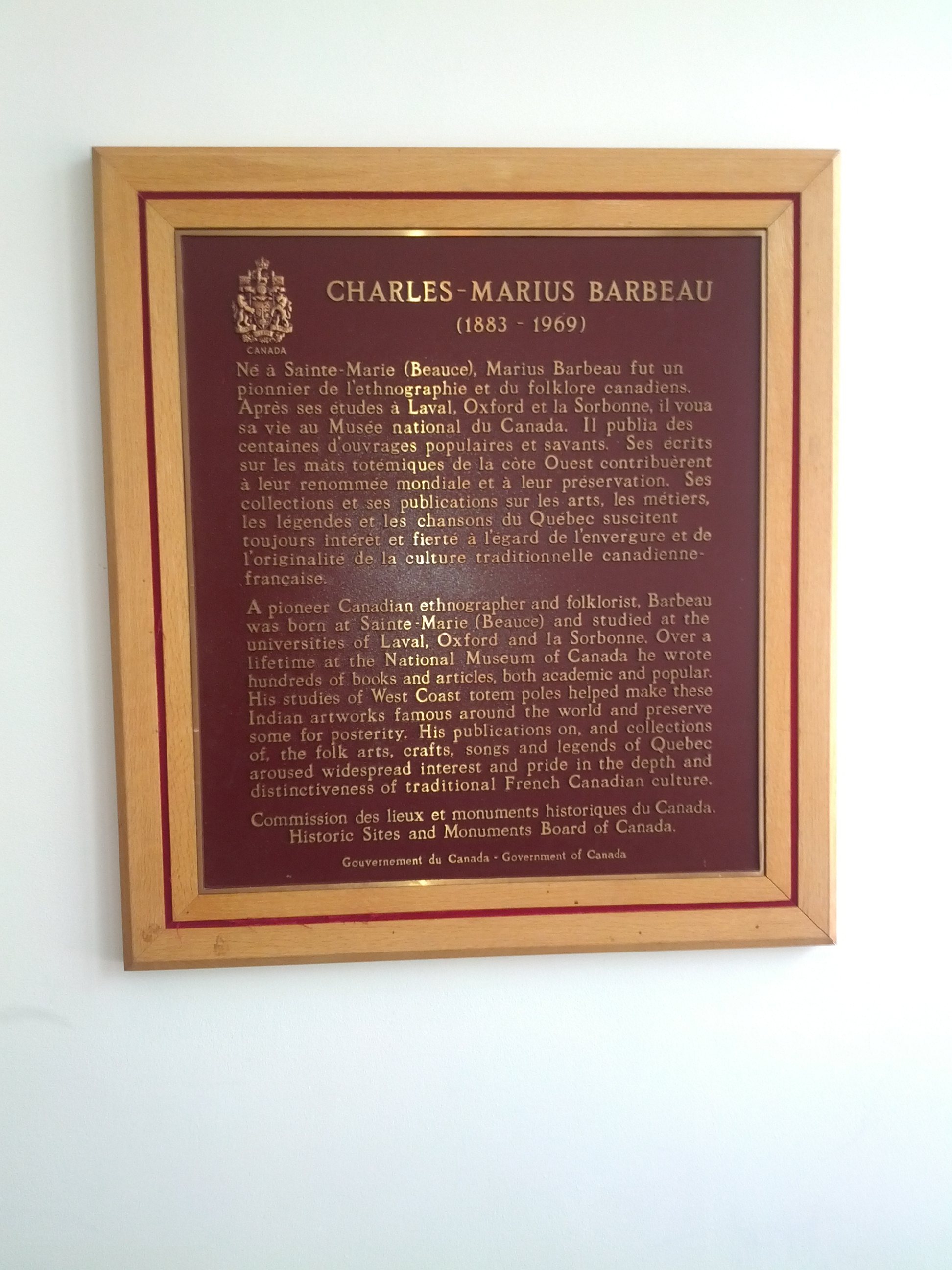
Sign about Marius Barbeau in Gatineau.

=== Cultural legacy ===
Barbeau was a prolific writer, producing both scholarly articles and monographs and books that presented Québecois and First Nations oral traditions for a mass audience. Examples include The Downfall of Temlaham, which weaves ancient Gitksan oral traditions with contemporary contact history. His The Golden Phoenix and other collections for children present French-Canadian folk and fairy tales.

From his fieldwork and writings on all aspects of French-Canadian creative expression, numerous popular and scholarly publications were produced. His work is credited with contributing significantly to the rise of Québecois nationalism in the late 20th century.

=== Awards and honours ===
Between 1916 and 1950, Barbeau served as associate editor of the Journal of American Folklore. During that time he edited ten issues of the journal, which primarily focused on Canadian folklore.

In 1922, Barbeau became the founding secretary of the Canadian Historical Association. In 1929 he became a founding board member of the Royal Canadian Geographical Society.

In 1950 Barbeau won the Royal Society of Canada's Lorne Pierce Medal. In 1967 he was made a Companion of the Order of Canada. In 1969, Barbeau Peak, the highest mountain in Nunavut, was named after him.

In 2005, Marius Barbeau's broadcasts and ethnological recordings were honoured as a MasterWork by the Audio-Visual Preservation Trust of Canada. His extensive personal papers are housed in the former National Museum of Man, since 2013 known as the Canadian Museum of History.

In 1985 the Folklore Studies Association of Canada established the "Marius Barbeau Medal" to recognize persons making remarkable contributions to Canadian folklore and ethnology.

== Portrait ==
An authorized bronze portrait bust of Barbeau was created by Russian-Canadian artist Eugenia Berlin; it is installed in the collection of the National Gallery of Canada.

== Selected works ==
- (1915) "Classification of Iroquoian radicals with subjective pronominal prefixes." Ottawa: Geological Survey of Canada. Memoir no. 46. GEOSCAN.
- (1915) Huron and Wyandot Mythology, with Appendix Containing Earlier Published Records. Ottawa: Geological Survey of Canada. Memoir no. 80. GEOSCAN.
- (1923) Indian Days in the Canadian Rockies. Illustrated by W. Langdon Kihn. Toronto: Macmillan.
- (with Edward Sapir) (1925) Folksongs of French Canada. New Haven: Yale University Press.
- (1928) The Downfall of Temlaham. Toronto: Macmillan.
- (1929) "Totem Poles of the Gitksan, Upper Skeena River, British Columbia." Ottawa: National Museum of Canada. Bulletin no. 61. GEOSCAN.
- (1933) "How Asia Used to Drip at the Spout into America," Washington Historical Quarterly, vol. 24, pp. 163–173.
- (1934) Au Coeur de Québec. Montréal: Zodiaque.
- (1934) Cornelius Krieghoff: Pioneer Painter of North America. Toronto: Macmillan.
- (1934) La merveilleuse aventure de Jacques Cartier. Montréal: A. Levesque.
- (1935) "Folk-songs of Old Quebec." Ottawa: National Museum of Canada. Bulletin no. 75. GEOSCAN.
- (1935) Grand'mère raconte. Montréal: Beauchemin.
- (1935) Il était une fois. Montréal: Beauchemin.
- (1936) The Kingdom Saguenay. Toronto: Macmillan.
- (1936) Québec, ou survit l'ancienne France (Quebec: Where Ancient France Lingers.) Québec City: Garneau.
- (with Marguerite and Raoul d'Harcourt) (1937) Romanceros du Canada. Montréal: Beauchemin.
- (1942) Maîtres artisans de chez-nous. Montréal: Zodiaque.
- (1942) Les Rêves des chasseurs. Montréal: Beauchemin.
- (with Grace Melvin) (1943) The Indian Speaks. Toronto: Macmillan.
- (with Rina Lasnier) (1944) Madones canadiennes. Montréal: Beauchemin.
- (1944) Mountain Cloud. Toronto: Macmillan.
- (1944–1946) Saintes artisanes. 2 vols. Montréal: Fides.
- (1945) "The Aleutian Route of Migration into America." Geographical Review, vol. 35, no. 3, pp. 424–443.
- (1945) "Bear Mother." Journal of American Folklore, vol. 59, no. 231, pp. 1–12.
- (1945) Ceinture flechée. Montréal: Paysana.
- (1946) Alouette! Montréal: Lumen.
- (1947) Alaska Beckons. Toronto: Macmillan.
- (1947) L'Arbre des rèves (The Tree of Dreams). Montréal: Thérrien.
- (1950; reissued 1990) Totem Poles. 2 vols. (Anthropology Series 30, National Museum of Canada Bulletin 119.) Ottawa: National Museum of Canada. Reprinted, Canadian Museum of Civilization, Hull, Quebec, 1990. Individual chapters available in pdf on the website of the Canadian Museum of History.
- (1952) "The Old-World Dragon in America." In Indian Tribes of Aboriginal America: Selected Papers of the XXIXth International Congress of Americanists, ed. by Sol Tax, pp. 115–122. Chicago: University of Chicago Press.
- (1953) Haida Myths. Ottawa: National Museum of Canada.
- (1954) "'Totemic Atmosphere' on the North Pacific Coast." Journal of American Folklore, vol. 67, pp. 103-122.
- (1957) Haida Carvers in Argillite. Ottawa: National Museum of Canada.
- (1957) J'ai vu Québec. Québec City: Garneau.
- (1957) My Life in Recording: Canadian-Indian Folklore. Folkways Records
- (ed.) (1958) The Golden Phoenix and Other Fairy Tales from Quebec. Retold by Michael Hornyansky. Toronto: Oxford University Press.
- (1958) Medicine-Men on the North Pacific Coast. Ottawa: National Museum of Canada.
- (1958) Pathfinders in the North Pacific. Toronto: Ryerson.
- (et al.) (1958) Roundelays: Dansons à la Ronde. Ottawa: National Museum of Canada.
- (1960) Indian Days on the Western Prairies. Ottawa: National Museum of Canada.
- (1960) "Huron-Wyandot Traditional Narratives: In Translations and Native Texts." National Museum of Canada Bulletin 165, Anthropological Series 47.
- (1961) Tsimsyan Myths. (Anthropological Series 51, National Museum of Canada Bulletin 174.) Ottawa: Department of Northern Affairs and National Resources.
- (1962) Jongleur Songs of Old Quebec. Rutgers University Press.
- (1965–1966) Indiens d'Amérique. 3 vols. Montréal: Beauchemin.
- (1968) Louis Jobin, statuaire. Montréal: Beauchemin.
- (1973) "Totem Poles of the Gitksan, Upper Skeena River, British Columbia." Ottawa: National Museum of Canada. Bulletin no. 61, (ed. Facsimile).

== See also ==
- Kenneth Peacock
- Nisga'a and Haida Crest Poles of the Royal Ontario Museum

== Bibliography ==
- Katz, Israel J. (1970) “Marius Barbeau (1883-1969)(Necrology: Biography-Bibliography)," Ethnomusicology, XIV/1 (Jan.), 129-42.
- Cove, John J. (1985) A Detailed Inventory of the Barbeau Northwest Coast Files. (National Museum of Man Mercury Series, Canadian Centre for Folk Culture Studies, Paper 54.) Ottawa: National Museums of Canada.
- Wilson Duff (1964) "Contributions of Marius Barbeau to West Coast Ethnology," Anthropologica (new series) 6 (1): 63-96 doi:10.2307/25604600 from JSTOR
- MacDonald, George F., and John J. Cove (eds.) (1987) Tsimshian Narratives. Collected by Marius Barbeau and William Beynon. (Canadian Museum of Civilization Mercury Series, Directorate Paper 3.) 2 vols. Ottawa: Directorate, Canadian Museum of Civilization.
- Nowry, Laurence (1995) Marius Barbeau, Man of Mana: A Biography. Toronto: NC Press. ISBN 1550211005
- Orford, Emily (1986) "Anthropologist’s field work on west coast began in 1914," In Western People, 23 January 23, 1986.
- Orford, Emily (1984) "Charles Marius Barbeau: Photo-ethnologist of coast Indians." In Victoria Times-Colonist: The Islander, May 13, 1984. 10-11.
- Slaney, Frances M. (2000) "Working for a Canadian Sense of Place(s): The Role of Landscape Painters in Marius Barbeau's Ethnology," In Excluded Ancestors, Inventible Traditions: Essays toward a More Inclusive History of Anthropology, ed. by Richard Handler, pp. 81–122. Madison: University of Wisconsin Press.
