= Ron Hamilton =

Ron Hamilton may refer to:

- Ron Hamilton (artist) (born 1948), Nuu-chah-nulth artist and cultural figure
- Ron Hamilton (musician) (1950–2023), American Christian musician, composer, preacher, and radio personality

== See also ==
- Ronald Hamilton, American tenor
- Ronnie Hamilton (born 1945), Scottish retired professional footballer
