= Erna Gunther =

American anthropologist

Erna Gunther (1896–1982) was an American anthropologist who taught for many years at the University of Washington in Seattle. Gunther's work on ethnobotany was still extensively consulted in the 1980s.

== Biography ==
Gunther was born in 1896 in Brooklyn, New York. She graduated from Barnard College in 1919, as a student of Franz Boas, and received her MA in anthropology from Columbia University in 1920, studying under Boas. After graduating, she moved with her husband, Leslie Spier, to the University of Washington in 1921. After leaving for a short period of time with her husband, she returned in 1929. Her husband left in 1930 and their marriage was dissolved shortly after. Gunther stayed at the university and continued teaching.

She helped create the core of the newly formed anthropology program at the University of Washington in the 1920s, along with Spier and Melville Jacobs. In 1930, the Washington State Museum named her Director. The faculty grew from two residents in 1930 to ten in 1955 during her time as chair of the University's Anthropology Department. In 1966, she moved to the University of Alaska Fairbanks, becoming chair in 1967.

As an American Indian specialist, her research focused on the Coast Salish and Makah peoples of western Washington state, with publications on ethnobotany, ethnohistory, and general ethnology.

Her students included anthropologists Wayne Suttles, Dale Croes and Wilson Duff.

In 1949, she helped finance the archaeological investigation run by Charles E. Borden at Walen's farm (DfRs-3) on Boundary Bay.

== Works ==
- An Analysis of the First Salmon Ceremony, American Anthropologist, Vol 28 (1926)
- Ethnobotany of Western Washington. University of Washington Press, Seattle. University of Washington Publications in Anthropology, vol. 10, no. 1, pp. 1–62. (1945) (on archive.org)
- Ethnobotany of Western Washington: the Knowledge and Use of Indigenous Plants by Native Americans, University of Washington Press, Seattle (1973)
- Indian life on the Northwest coast of North America, as seen by the early explorers and fur traders during the last decades of the eighteenth century. Chicago, University of Chicago Press. (1972) (on archive.org)
- Klallam Ethnography. University of Washington Press, Seattle. University of Washington Publications in Anthropology, vol. 1, no. 5, pp. 171–314. (1925) (on archive.org)
- Klallam Folk Tales. University of Washington Press, Seattle. University of Washington Publications in Anthropology, vol. 1, no. 4, pp. 113–170. (1925) (on archive.org)
- Haeberlin, Hermann and Erna Gunther. 1930. The Indians of Puget Sound. University of Washington Press, Seattle. University of Washington Publications in Anthropology, vol. 4, no. 1, pp. 1–84. (on archive.org, reprint of 1945 on archive.org)

== Sources ==
- Abbott, Donald N. (ed.) The World Is as Sharp as a Knife: An Anthology in Honour of Wilson Duff. Victoria: British Columbia Provincial Museum.
- Miller, Jay, and Carol M. Eastman (eds.) (1984) The Tsimshian and Their Neighbors of the North Pacific Coast. Seattle: University of Washington Press.
- Garfield, Viola E. and Pamela T. Amoss (1984) 'Erna Gunther (1896–1982)'. American Anthropologist 86(2): 394–399.
