= Wayne Suttles =

American anthropologist and linguist

Wayne Suttles (April 24, 1918 – May 9, 2005) was an American anthropologist and linguist.

He was the leading authority on the ethnology and linguistics of the Coast Salish peoples of the Northwest Coast of North America.

== Biography ==
Suttles grew up on a dairy farm in Bothell, Washington, and attended high school in town before going on to study at the University of Washington. He graduated from the institution in 1941 with a degree in anthropology. He served as a naval Japanese language officer on Okinawa during World War II, before returning to the University of Washington in 1946 to begin studying for his Ph.D. in anthropology. As a student of Erna Gunther, Melville Jacobs, Viola Garfield, and Verne F. Ray at the University of Washington, Suttles in 1951, was the first to be awarded a Ph.D. in anthropology at that institution. While studying at the university, he met fellow anthropology student Shirley Smith; the two married in 1941.

He did ethnographic work with Northwest Coast people, especially the Coast Salish, beginning in the mid-1940s and linguistic work beginning in the mid-1950s. His publications on the Coast Salish, including his interpretation of the relationship between culture and environment and the nature of the social network, have had a significant influence on both ethnographic and archaeological work in the region. As editor of Vol. 7, Northwest Coast, of the Handbook of North American Indians, Suttles was instrumental in making scholars active in different kinds of research aware of each other's work. He also testified as an expert witness in several legal cases relating to Native rights in both Washington State and British Columbia, the most important of which was R. v. Sparrow, which established First Nations fishing rights across Canada. His 2004 grammar of the Musqueam language was a milestone in Salish studies.

Suttles taught at the University of British Columbia from 1952 to 1963, the University of Nevada, Reno, from 1963 to 1966, and Portland State University from 1966 onwards. He retired in 1985 and later moved to the San Juan Islands with his wife. Suttles died there on May 9, 2005, of pancreatic cancer.

== Selected works ==
- (2004) Musqueam Reference Grammar. Vancouver: University of British Columbia Press.
- (1998) The Ethnographic Significance of the Fort Langley Journals. pp. 163–210 in The Fort Langley Journals, 1827-1830, Edited by Morag Maclachlan. Vancouver: University of British Columbia Press.
- (1987) Coast Salish Essays. Vancouver: Talonbooks; Seattle: University of Washington.
- (1974) The Economic Life of the Coast Salish of Haro and Rosario Straits. New York: Garland.
