= Joe David =

Nuu-chah-nulth artist

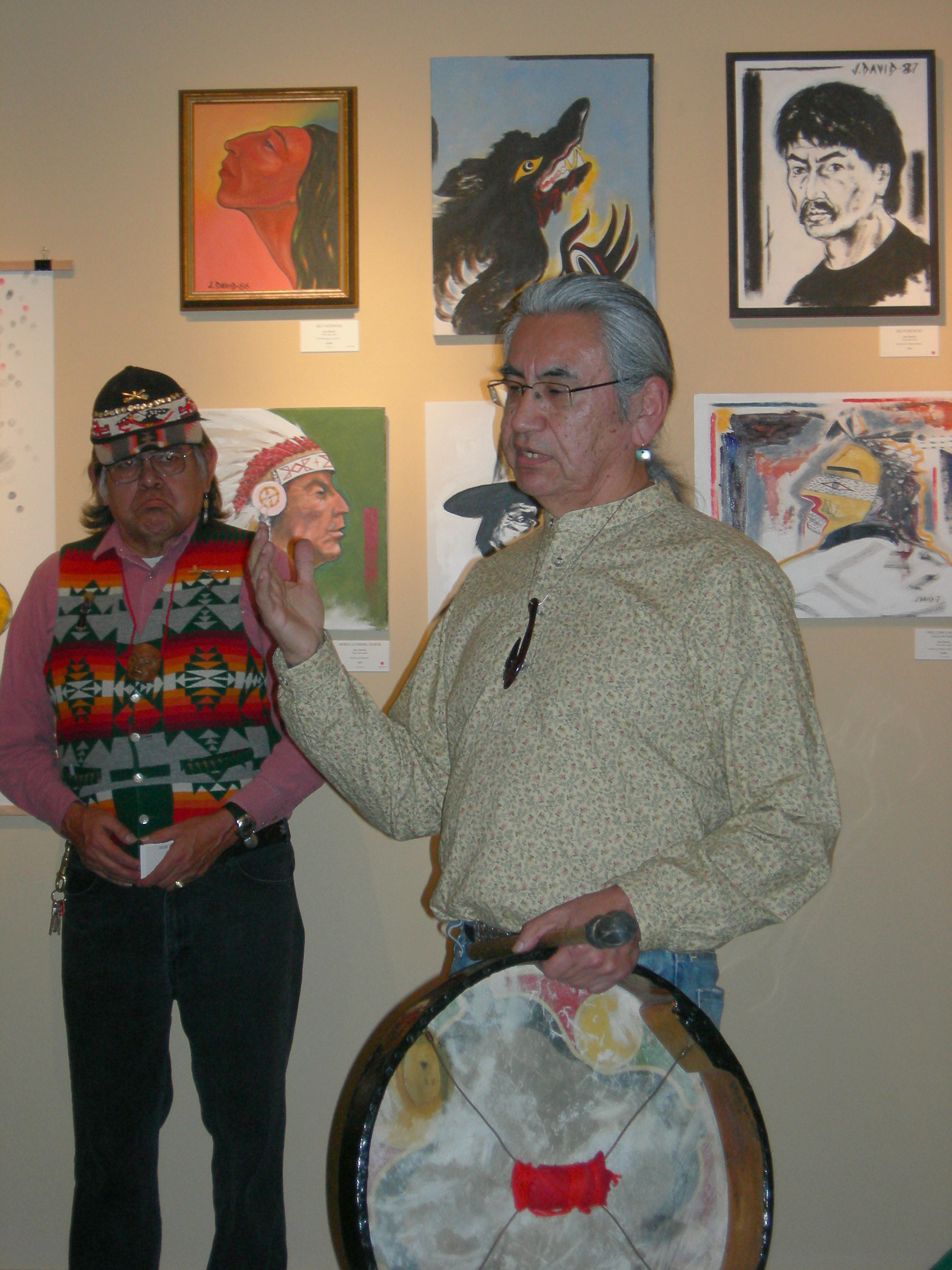
- Born: June 30, 1946; Opitsaht, British Columbia
- Known for: carver, printmaker
- Movement: Northwest Coast art

Joe David (born June 30, 1946) is a Nuu-chah-nulth artist, a member of the Tla-o-qui-aht Band of the Nuu-chah-nulth people, also formally "adopted" into the Haida people, whose work is identified with the contemporary Northwest Coast art movement; among his close associates are teacher and art historian Bill Holm, Duane Pasco, and his cousin Ron Hamilton. He is also a singer of traditional Nuu-chah-nulth songs, and has a strong interest in shamanic traditions, both those from his own culture and from others.

== Early life and education ==
David was born in the Clayoquot village of Opitsaht (on Meares Island off the west coast of Vancouver Island). His father Hyacinth David, an elder of the Clayoquot Nation, gave him a strong grounding in his cultural heritage. As a child, he attended a mission boarding school. While there, David visited the school's chapel for quiet and solitude. He saw that the carved altar in the chapel was similar to the artwork of his people in the awe and respect that it inspired. He studied art in the Job Corps, attended art school in San Marcos, Texas and Seattle, and worked briefly as a commercial artist (among other places, for Seattle's Bon Marché department store) before, in 1969, turning more specifically to Northwest Coast Native art after he was visiting the Burke Museum collection of Northwest Native art, curated by Bill Holm. Of this collection, David said "Here was this collection that Bill Holm had curated and understood and treated properly -- it was like, wow! This was not the academic, Mickey Mouse stuff. I was just blitzed. It was just between the eyes, like man, I've got to not only study and learn this, but I've got to master it." In 1971, he met Duane Pasco, who encouraged his interest in two-dimensional representation and experimentation with Northwest Coast styles."

== Artwork ==
He was one of the innovators of serigraphy featuring traditional Northwest Coast Native motifs, and has worked in a variety of media, including carving totem poles. In the 1981 documentary "Spirit of the Mask," David expresses his love of the wood and the tools with which he works. His eclecticism has involved an interest not only in his native traditions and the broad mainstream of contemporary North American culture, but also in other Native American traditions (he participates annually in a Sun Dance in the southwestern United States) and, for example, by Maori art. Rejecting the view that traditional Northwest Native cultures should somehow remain frozen in time, he has remarked "The fact is, there is always change and our people have always been comfortable with it." He emphasizes that his work is not a tribute to the past, but to a living culture.

== Collections ==
David has pieces in the permanent collections of the Metropolitan Museum of Art in New York City and in the Museum of Anthropology at UBC.
