= Gyaehlingaay =

1991 book

Gyaehlingaay: Traditions, Tales, and Images of the Kaigani Haida
- Editor: Carol Eastman and Elizabeth Edwards
- Language: Haida and English
- Published: 1991
- Publisher: Burke Museum
- ISBN: 0-295-96824-9

Gyaehlingaay: Traditions, Tales, and Images of the Kaigani Haida is a collection of Kaigani Haida stories, collected and edited by Carol Eastman and Elizabeth Edwards. It was published in 1991 by the Burke Museum. Containing stories in both Haida and English, the book especially focuses on stories told by Haida elder Lillian Pettviel. The book was illustrated by Duane Pasco.

== General references ==
- Ames, K.M. (July 1992). "Anthropology -- Gyaehlingaay: Traditions, Tales, and Images of the Kaigani Haida by Carol M. Eastman and Elizabeth A. Edwards with traditional stories told by Lillian Pettviel and other Haida Elders". CHOICE. 29 (11–12): 1720. ISSN 0009-4978.
- Chandonnet, Ann (1991-12-01). "Stories offer a glimpse into other cultures". Anchorage Times. p. 70.
- Dauenhauer, Richard (1992-02-13). "New books helps preserve old Haida narratives". Juneau Empire. p. 10.
- Foster, Edward (January 1994). "Books for the western library -- Gyaehlingaay: Traditions, Tales, and Images of the Kaigani Haida by Carol M. Eastman and Elizabeth A. Edwards". Journal of the West. 33 (1): 118. ISSN 0022-5169. EBSCOhost 9405055430
- Ruppert, James (1994). "Gyaehlingaay: Traditions, Tales, and Images of the Kaigani Haida". MELUS. 19 (1): 139. doi:10.2307/467798.
