= Brian Thom =

Canadian anthropologist

- Born: 1970 (age 55–56)
- Occupation: Anthropologist
- Website: www.brianthom.ca

Brian Thom is a Canadian anthropologist, former land claims negotiator and Indigenous title, rights and governance advisor.

He is a professor and chair in the Department of Anthropology at the University of Victoria, where in 2010 he founded the UVic Ethnographic Mapping Lab.

== Biography ==
Brian Thom has done extensive fieldwork since the early 1990s with Coast Salish communities in southwest British Columbia, and more limited fieldwork with other Indigenous peoples in Canada, the US, and the Russian Far East. He has frequently been interviewed or cited by the media for his anthropologist perspective on Indigenous rights and title issues. In 2014 his work on ethnographic mapping using Google Earth was featured in a 2-page weekend spread in the Globe and Mail, an article that won the reporter Justine Hunter the Jack Webster Award for Digital Journalism.

=== Early career ===
Early in his career he conducted archaeological research in southwest British Columbia which attended to the dynamics of social and cultural change and continuity in the Salish Sea over the past two millennia, and wrote. Thom received his Ph.D. from McGill University in 2005, his doctoral dissertation draws on a philosophy of place to situate a detailed political ethnography of southeast Vancouver Island Coast Salish peoples' relationships to land.

=== Modern Day Treaty Negotiations ===
Over 14 years between 2000 and 2014 he worked for Sto:lo Nation and the Hul'qumi'num Treaty Group as a negotiator, researcher, and senior advisor. During this time he led negotiations for the HTG-Parks Canada Cooperative Park Management agreement and the HTG-Archaeology branch agreement; co-authored the HTG Strategic Land Use Plan, and Call to Action on Shared Decision Making, participated in the Common Table negotiations, and contributed to the HTG petition to the Inter-American Commission on Human Rights (IACHR).

=== Scholarly work ===
Since joining the Department of Anthropology at the University of Victoria, his research has focused on the political, social and cultural processes that surround Indigenous people's efforts to resolve title and rights claims, and establish self-government. He has published in English and French, chronicling the experiences of the Hul'qumi'num Treaty Group case against Canada at the IACHR.

Brian Thom's scholarship challenges conventional approaches to mapping Indigenous peoples' territories, theorizing how they are instrumental in producing problematic discourses of overlapping claims. and the power of bring ethnographic approaches to Indigenous mapping. Indigenous legal orders have figured centrally in his ethnographic work, including of Coast Salish laws of caring for the dead and Coast Salish land tenure systems. He has led community-engaged research, including the Commemorating Ye'yumnuts project with Cowichan Tribes, and the work to Indigenize the Cordova Bay Local Area Plan. Bian led archaeological investigations at the ancient village site of ȾEL ̧IȽĆE / c̓əl̓íɫč in Cordova Bay in 2023, working across several waterfront municipal parks and on a rock feature. The work was widely covered in the media.

Thom has served on the editorial board of the Canadian Anthropology Society journal Anthropologica and is a Fellow of the Royal Anthropological Institute.

== Recognition ==
=== Awards and honours ===
Brian Thom's work has had impact beyond the academy, which has been recognized by several distinguished awards and honours. In 2022 Brian Thom received the prestigious Leadership Victoria award for Extending Reconciliation, in recognition of his work with WSANEC communities and the District of Saanich to Indigenize local area planning in Cordova Bay. https://www.leadershipvictoria.ca/vcla-winners; https://www.uvic.ca/news/topics/2022+leadership-victoria-thom+news

In 2022 Brian Thom was awarded the UVic Provost's Award in Engaged Scholarship, a distinction for tenured faculty members who have achieved great distinction as community engaged scholars. https://www.uvic.ca/news/topics/2022+provosts-engaged-scholars+news

In 2021 Brian was a nominee for the Confederation of University Faculty Associations of British Columbia Distinguished Academics award Academic of the Year. https://www.cufa.bc.ca/awards/past-winners/winners-of-the-2021-distinguished-academics-awards-nominees/

In 2020, Brian Thom was recognized by the University of Victoria Faculty of Social Sciences for outstanding community outreach https://www.uvic.ca/socialsciences/people/awards-honours/index.php

In 2023 Brian's work through UVic's Ethnographic Mapping Lab was recognized by Google with an Geo For Good Impact Award. https://www.uvic.ca/socialsciences/info-for/faculty-staff/announcements/brian-thom-google-impact-award.php

== Selected works ==
(2024) Thom, Brian. Leaving Valdes, Staying Lyackson: Voices of the Indigenous Community of Valdes Island. pp. 273–290 in Salish Archipelago: Environment and Society in the Islands Within and Adjacent to the Salish Sea, edited by Moshe Rapaport. Canberra: ANU Press. http://doi.org/10.22459/SA.2024 or https://press-files.anu.edu.au/downloads/press/n12334/pdf/ch14.pdf [Open Access]

(2022) Thom, Brian. Encountering Indigenous Legal Orders in Canada. Invited contribution to Oxford Handbook of Law and Anthropology. Marie-Claire Foblets, editor. Oxford: Oxford University Press. https://dx.doi.org/10.1093/oxfordhb/9780198840534.013.15

(2020) Thom, Brian with Sarah Morales. The Principle of Sharing and the Shadow of Canadian Property Law. pp. 120–162 in Creating Indigenous Property: Power, Rights, and Relationships, edited by Angela Cameron, Sari Graben, and Val Napoleon. Toronto, University of Toronto Press. https://dx.doi.org/10.3138/9781487532116-005

(2020) Encountering Indigenous Legal Orders in Canada. Invited contribution to Oxford Handbook of Law and Anthropology. Marie-Claire Foblets, Mark Goodale, Maria Sapignoli, and Olaf Zenke, editors. London: Oxford University Press. https://dx.doi.org/10.1093/oxfordhb/9780198840534.013.15

(2020) Addressing the Challenge of Overlapping Claims in Implementing the Vancouver Island (Douglas) Treaties. Anthropologica. 62(2):295-307. https://doi.org/10.3138/anth-2020-0014

(2019) Leveraging International Power: Private Property and the Human Rights of Indigenous Peoples in Canada. pp. 184–203 in Scales of Governance and Indigenous Peoples' Rights, edited by Jennifer Hays and Irène Bellier. (Law and the Postcolonial: Ethics, Politics, and Economy Series), Routledge, London. ISBN 9781138944480 https://doi.org/10.4324/9781315671888

(2019) Tirer parti du droit international: la propriété privée et les droits des peuples autochthones au Canada. pp 195–216 dans Les échelles de la gouvernance et des droits des peuples autochtones, Sous la direction de Irène Bellier et Jennifer Hays. Paris, L'Harmattan. ISBN 978-2-343-17978-0 https://www.editions-harmattan.fr/index.asp?navig=catalogue&obj=livre&no=63415

(2017) Entanglements in Coast Salish Ancestral Territories. In Entangled Territorialities: Indigenous Peoples from Canada and Australia in the 21st Century, edited by Françoise Dussart & Sylvie Poirier. pp. 140–162. Anthropological Horizons Series, University of Toronto Press, Toronto. https://utorontopress.com/ca/entangled-territorialities-2

(2016) Thom, Brian; Colombi, Benedict J.; Degai, Tatiana (1 January 2016). "Bringing Indigenous Kamchatka to Google Earth: Collaborative Digital Mapping with the Itelmen Peoples". Sibirica. 15 (3): 1–30. doi:10.3167/sib.2016.150301.

(2014) Thom, Brian (January 2014). "Reframing Indigenous Territories: Private Property, Human Rights and Overlapping Claims". American Indian Culture and Research Journal. 38 (4): 3–28. doi:10.17953/aicr.38.4.6372163053512w6x. hdl:1828/6270.

Thom, Brian (2014) Confusion sur les territoires autochthones au Canada. pp. 89–106 dans Terres, territoires, ressources : Politiques, pratiques et droits des peuples autochtones, Sous la direction de Irène Bellier. Paris, L'Harmattan. https://www.editions-harmattan.fr/index.asp?navig=catalogue&obj=livre&no=46070

(2012) Angelbeck, Bill; Grier, Colin (October 2012). "Anarchism and the Archaeology of Anarchic Societies: Resistance to Centralization in the Coast Salish Region of the Pacific Northwest Coast" (PDF). Current Anthropology. 53 (5): 547–587. doi:10.1086/667621. S2CID 142786065.

(2010) Thom, Brian (2010). "The Anathema of Aggregation: Toward 21st-Century Self-Government in the Coast Salish World". Anthropologica. 52 (1): 33–48. JSTOR 29545993.

(2009) Thom, Brian (April 2009). "The paradox of boundaries in Coast Salish territories". Cultural Geographies. 16 (2): 179–205. doi:10.1177/1474474008101516. S2CID 144554257.

(2008) Thom, Brian (19 November 2008). "Disagreement-in-principle: Negotiating the right to practice Coast Salish culture in treaty talks on Vancouver Island, BC". New Proposals: Journal of Marxism and Interdisciplinary Inquiry. 2 (1): 23–30.

(2004) Thom, Brian (2004). "Le sens du lieu et les revendications territoriales contemporaines des Salishs de la Côte" [The sense of place and contemporary land claims of the Coast Salish people]. Recherches Amérindiennes Au Québec (in French). 34 (3): 59–74, 2, 116–117. doi:10.7202/1082186ar. hdl:1828/6609. S2CID 194339235. ProQuest 1697485111.

(2003) Thom, Brian (2003). "The Anthropology of Northwest Coast Oral Traditions". Arctic Anthropology. 40 (1): 1–28. doi:10.1353/arc.2011.0035. JSTOR 40316573. S2CID 162868717.

(2001) Harlan I. Smith and the Jesup North Pacific Expedition. In Gateways: Exploring the Legacy of the Jesup North Pacific Expedition, edited. by I. Krupnik and W. Fitzhugh. pp. 139–180. Arctic Studies Center, National Museum of Natural History, Smithsonian Institution, Washington. https://archive.org/stream/gatewaysexplorin12001krup#page/138/mode/2up

(1992) Thom, Brian (December 1992). "Whalen Farm Revisited: 40 Year Later". The Midden. 24 (5): 3–6.

(1992) Thom, Brian (1992). "An Investigation of Interassemblage Variability within the Gulf of Georgia Phase". Canadian Journal of Archaeology. 16: 24–31. JSTOR 41102848.
