= Duane Pasco =

American artist (1932–2024)

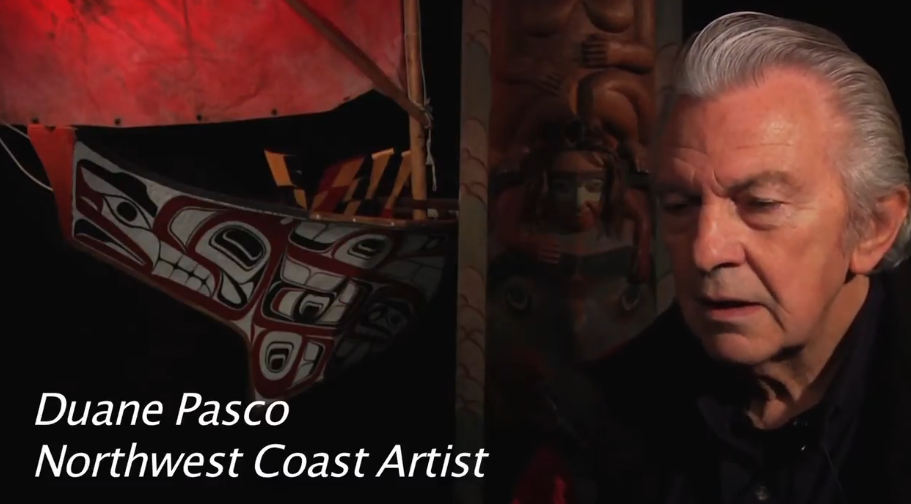
- Born: May 14, 1932
- Died: July 31, 2024 (age 92)
- Website: jayhawkinstitute.org

Duane Pasco (May 14, 1932 - July 31, 2024) was an American artist. He was known for his indigenous-style work and as a teacher of Northwest Coast art, in particular as a key contributor to reviving the 'Ksan style.

Pasco was raised in Alaska and Seattle, and was of English and Irish descent. He was professionally active since his first gallery showing in 1966, working in both carving and two-dimensional formats. In 1967, he took a leave of absence from his then-employment for a steel-construction company, in order to move beyond what he describes as making "curios" and pursue art education full-time. He again made a major change in approach in 1976. At both these times, he was heavily influenced in his artistic development by the writings and works of artist and historian Bill Holm. He has taught classes at many universities and schools in Washington, British Columbia, and Alaska, notably the Gitanmaax School of Northwest Coast Indian Art ('Ksan), where he influenced artists such as Walter Harris. He was a friend and associate of Nuu-Chah-Nulth artist Joe David. Pasco was a noted canoe carver, mentoring novice canoe carvers and actively assisting them in the steaming process.

His carved totems are publicly viewable in Seattle at Occidental Park and Seattle Center, in Sitka, Alaska at Sitka National Historical Park, and in Bergen at Nordnes Park.

He was a speaker and expounder of Chinook Jargon. In the early 1990s he published the bi-monthly Tenas Wawa newsletter in Poulsbo, Washington. He provided the illustrations for Gyaehlingaay, a 1991 collection of Kaigani Haida stories.

Duane Pasco died July 31, 2024, at his home in Poulsbo, Washington.
