= Carol Eastman =

American linguist (1941–1997)

- Born: 1941
- Died: October 15, 1997 (aged 55–56); Queen's Hospital, Honolulu, Hawai'i, United States of America

Carol M. Eastman (1941-1997) was an American linguist and author. She worked as a professor, later dean and vice provost, at the University of Washington until 1993 and then as a Senior Vice President at the University of Hawaiʻi until her death. She wrote multiple books on linguistics, did research in Africa, and studied the Kaigani Haida dialect.

== Career and education ==
Eastman received a bachelor of arts degree in English from the University of Massachusetts, a master's in linguistics at the University of Washington, and a PhD in linguistics at the University of Wisconsin. She was hired at the University of Washington as an assistant professor of linguistics and anthropology in 1967, becoming a full professor in 1978. By 1991, Eastman had become chair of anthropology and also taught woman's studies. In 1993, she was appointed dean of the graduate school the vice provost at the university, succeeding Gene L. Wood. She moved to Hawai'i the next year, after she was hired as the Senior Vice President at the University of Hawaiʻi that fall.

Eastman learnt Swahili and performed research in Africa, later becoming treasurer at the African Studies Association. She began studying the Kaigani Haida dialect in the 1970s; in 1991, a book of stories she had collected with Elizabeth A. Edwards was published by the Burke Museum.

== Personal life ==
Eastman was born in 1941 in Boston, Massachusetts.

She was diagnosed with lung cancer in December, 1996. She continued her research and work, being featured in a 1997 Honolulu Star-Advertiser piece about living with cancer. She died suddenly on October 15, 1997, at the Queen's Hospital in Honolulu, Hawa'ii, about an hour before she had been scheduled to speak at a staff meeting.

== Bibliography ==
- Aspects of Language and Culture. Chandler and Sharp Publishers, Inc. 1978.
- Linguistic theory and language description. Lippincott. 1978.
- Language Planning: An Introduction. Chandler & Sharp Publishers Inc. 1983. ISBN 0-88316-552-X.

As an editor:

- Tsimshian and Their Neighbors of the North Pacific Coast. University of Washington Press. 1984. Collection of writings of Viola Garfield. With Jay Miller.
- Gyaehlingaay: Traditions, Tales, and Images of the Kaigani Haida. Burke Museum. 1991. ISBN 0-295-96824-9. With Elizabeth A. Edwards.
