= Jay Miller (anthropologist) =

American anthropologist

Jay Miller is an American anthropologist known for his wide-ranging fieldwork and scholarship on, as well as involvement with, a number of Native American groups, especially the Delaware (Lenape), Tsimshian, and Lushootseed Salish. He is himself of Lenape ancestry.

== Personal life ==
Miller grew up in upstate New York, where he was given a Mohawk (Iroquois) name. As an undergraduate, he was influenced by the anthropologist Florence Hawley Ellis. He received his Ph.D. from Rutgers University for a dissertation on the Keresan Pueblo people.

While in New Jersey, he was adopted and named in the Delaware Wolf clan; his clan mother being Nora Thompson Dean. His also lived in Seattle where his friendship with the anthropologist Viola Garfield led to fieldwork among the Tsimshian, where Miller was adopted into the Gispwudwada (Killerwhale clan). He was friends with Erna Gunther who lived in the Wallingford neighborhood of Seattle, near his house.

== Career ==
Miller wrote his PhD dissertation on the Keresan Pueblo people. While in New Jersey, he began working with speakers of the Delaware language and collaborated with Nora Thompson Dean on a publication on the Delaware "Big House" rite.

Miller was teaching at the University of Washington in the late 70s. At an anthropology symposium at Pacific Lutheran University in 1976, he was one of 4 lecturers to give papers on Indian fishing in Puget Sound. His friendship with the anthropologist Viola Garfield also led to fieldwork among the Tsimshian at Hartley Bay, British Columbia. In 1978, he cautioned anthropologists to use more complex models when considering Native American practices as a lot of practices thought to be unique to the West Coast are found in indigenous populations globally.

He has also done fieldwork with the Salish people at the Colville Indian Reservation and the Snoqualmie in Washington state, as well as the Muscogee. His research around 2012, uncovered discrepancies in the Charles Roblin's Schedule of Unenrolled Indians (also known as the Roblin Rolls or the Roblin Rolls of Non-Reservation Indians in Western Washington) as a result of notations by Roblins in red ink not being picked up in black and white photocopies.

Miller was also, for a time, associate director of the D'Arcy McNickle Center for American Indian History at the Newberry Library in Chicago.

== Bibliography ==
- "A Personal Account of the Delaware House Rite," 1978, with Nora Thompson Dean, Pennsylvania Archaeologist, vol. 48, nos. 1–2, pp. 39–43.
- "Feasting with the Southern Tsimshian," 1984, in The Tsimshian: Images of the Past: Views for the Present, ed. by Margaret Seguin, pp. 27–39. Vancouver: University of British Columbia Press.
- Shamanic Odyssey: The Lushootseed Salish Journey to the Land of the Dead (Ballena Press Anthropological Papers; No. 32), 1988, Menlo Park, Calif.: Ballena Press.
- Mourning Dove: A Salishan Autobiography, 1990, editor, Lincoln: University of Nebraska Press.
- Tsimshian Culture: A Light through the Ages, 1997, Lincoln: University of Nebraska Press.
- "Old Religion Among the Delawares: The Gamwing (Big House Rite)," 1997, in Ethnohistory 44 (1): 113-134 1997.
- "Tsimshian Ethno-Ethnohistory: A 'Real' Indigenous Chronology", 1998, in Ethnohistory 45 (4): 657-674.
- Lushootseed Culture and the Shamanic Odyssey, 1999, Lincoln: University of Nebraska Press.
- "Inflamed History: Violence Against Homesteading Indiens In Washington Territory," 2000, in North Dakota Quarterly, American Indian Issue, Summer/Fall, 67 (3/4): 162-173.
- "Keres: Engendered Key to the Pueblo Puzzle," 2001, Ethnohistory 48 (3): 495-514, Summer.
- "Naming as Humanizing," 2001, in Strangers to Relatives: The Adoption and Naming of Anthropologists in Native North America, ed. by Sergei Kan, pp. 141–158. Lincoln: University of Nebraska Press.
- "Rescues, Rants, and Researches: A Review of Jay Miller’s Writings on Northwest Indien Cultures," 2014. Darby Stapp and Kara Powers, eds. Journal of Northwest Anthropology [JONA], Memoir #9.
- Ancestral Mounds ~ Vitality and Volatility Crossing Native America, 2015. University of Nebraska Press.
- Evergreen Ethnographies: Hoh, Chehalis, Suquamish, and Snoqualmi of Western Washington, 2015.
- Native Nations of Washington: Tribal Peoples and Places of the Evergreen State, 2020.
- Shamanic Trek: Redeeming Rite of Puget Sound Lushootseeds, 2024.
- "Ethnobotany of Western Washington at 80: Commemorating Erna Gunther’s Pioneering Text, Updates, and Varied Impacts," 2025, Journal of Northwest Anthropology, spring 2005, vol. 59, no. 1, 133–150.
