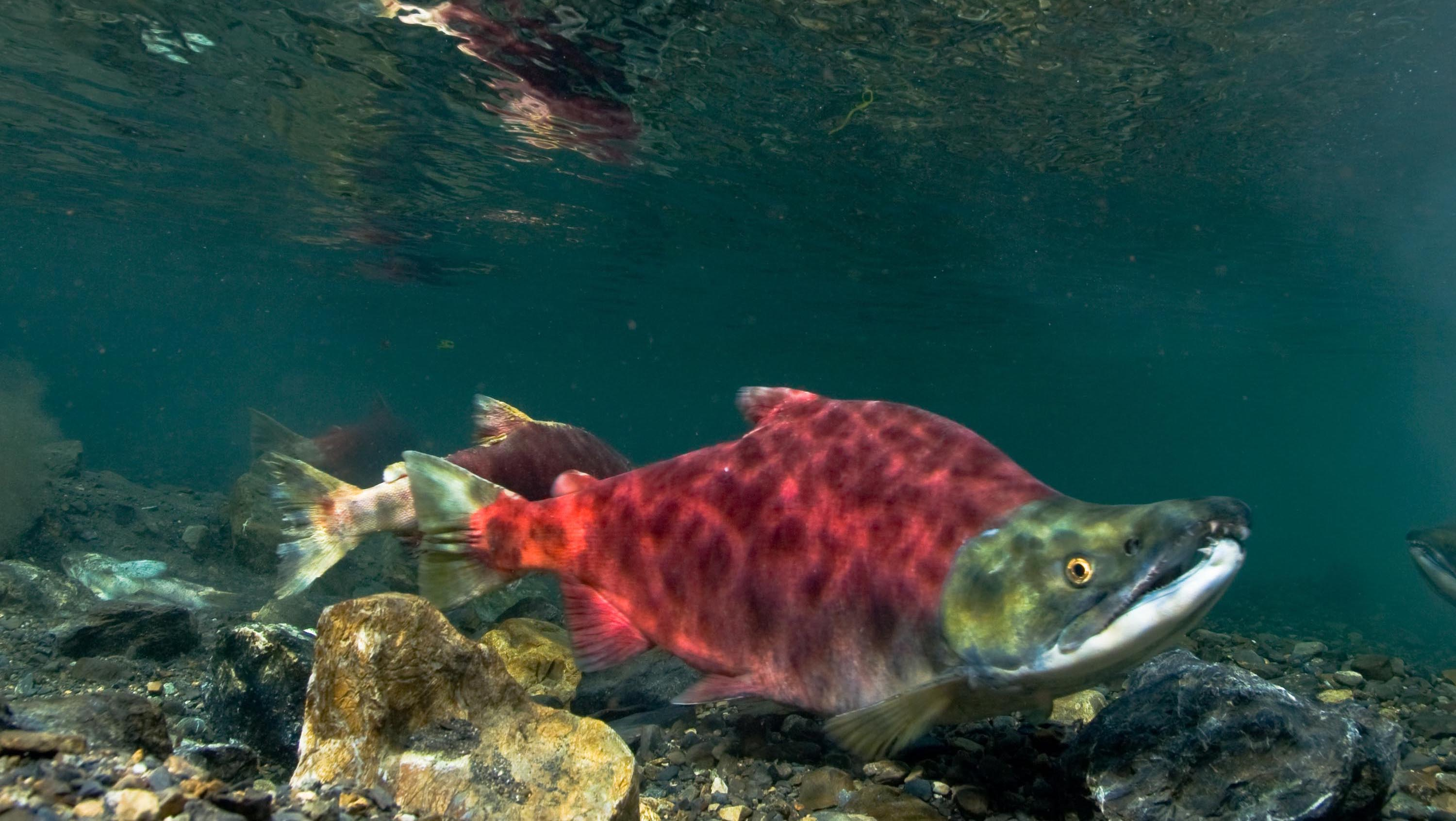
- Sockeye salmon in spawning colors

Conservation status
- Least Concern (IUCN 3.1)

Scientific classification
- Kingdom: Animalia
- Phylum: Chordata
- Class: Actinopterygii
- Division: Teleostei
- Order: Salmoniformes
- Family: Salmonidae
- Genus: Oncorhynchus
- Species: O. nerka

Binomial name
- Oncorhynchus nerka (Walbaum, 1792)

= Sockeye salmon =

Species of fish

The sockeye salmon (Oncorhynchus nerka), also called red salmon, kokanee salmon, blueback salmon, or simply sockeye, is an anadromous species of salmon found in the Northern Pacific Ocean and rivers discharging into it. This species is a Pacific salmon that is primarily red in hue during spawning. They can grow up to 84 cm (2 ft 9 in) in length and weigh 2.3 to 7 kg (5–15 lb). Juveniles remain in freshwater until they are ready to migrate to the ocean, over distances of up to 1,600 km (1,000 mi). Their diet consists primarily of zooplankton. Sockeye salmon are semelparous, dying after they spawn. Some populations, referred to as kokanee, do not migrate to the ocean and live their entire lives in fresh water.

== Classification and name origin ==
The sockeye salmon is the third-most common Pacific salmon species, after pink and chum salmon. Oncorhynchus comes from Ancient Greek ὄγκος (ónkos), meaning 'bend', and ῥύγχος (rhúnkhos), meaning 'snout'. The specific name nerka is the Russian name for the anadromous form. The name "sockeye" is an anglicization of suk-kegh (sθə́qəy̓ ), its name in Halkomelem, the language of the indigenous people along the lower reaches of the Fraser River (one of British Columbia's many native Coast Salish languages). Suk-kegh means 'red fish'.

== Description ==
The sockeye salmon is sometimes called red or blueback salmon, due to its color. Sockeye are blue tinged with silver in color while living in the ocean. When they return to spawning grounds, their bodies become red and their heads turn green. Sockeye can be anywhere from 60 to 84 cm (2 ft 0 in – 2 ft 9 in) in length and weigh from 2.3 to 7 kg (5–15 lb). Two distinguishing features are their long, serrated gill rakers that range from 30 to 40 in number, and their lack of a spot on their tail or back.

== Range and habitat ==
Sockeye salmon range as far south as the Columbia River in the eastern Pacific (although individuals have been spotted as far south as the 10 Mile River on the Mendocino Coast of California) and in northern Hokkaido in Japan in the western Pacific. They range as far north as the Bathurst Inlet in the Canadian Arctic in the east and the Anadyr River in Siberia in the west. The farthest inland sockeye salmon travel is to Redfish Lake, Idaho, over 1,400 km (900 mi) by river from the ocean and 2,000 m (6,500 ft) in elevation. In the United States, populations of sockeye salmon have been extirpated from Idaho and Oregon.

=== Landlocked populations ===
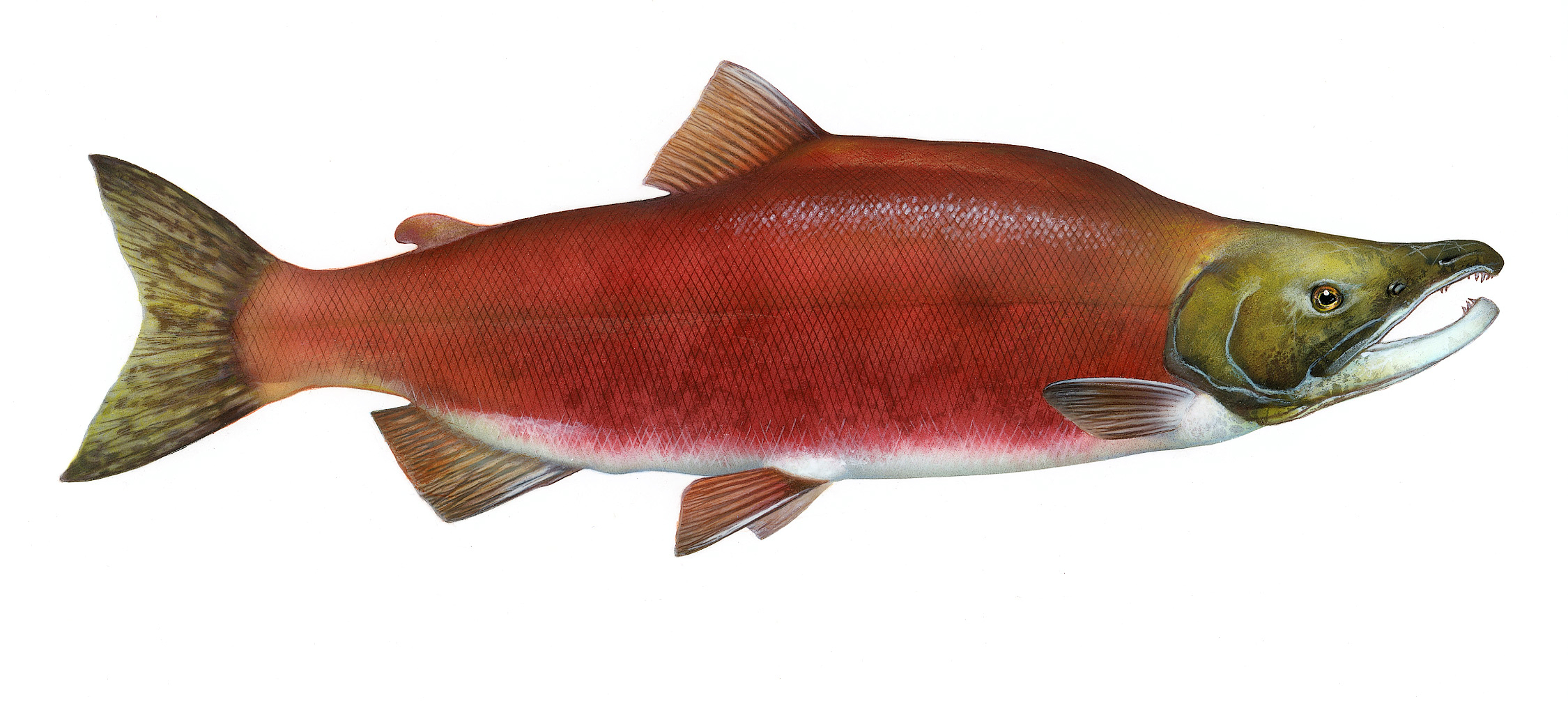
Male spawning-phase sockeye

Some sockeye salmon populations are completely landlocked. Sockeye that live and reproduce in lakes are commonly called kokanee, which is red-fish name in the Sinixt Interior Salish language and silver trout in the Okanagan language. They are much smaller than the anadromous variety and are rarely over 35 cm (14 in) long. In the Okanagan Lake and many others, there are two kinds of kokanee populations – one spawns in streams and the other near lake shores. Landlocked populations occur in the Yukon Territory and British Columbia in Canada, as well as, in Alaska, Washington, Oregon, California, New York, Utah, Idaho, Montana, Nevada, Colorado, New Mexico, and Wyoming in the United States. Nantahala Lake is the only place in North Carolina where kokanee salmon are found. The fish, which is native to western North America, was stocked in Nantahala Lake in the mid-1960s by the NC Wildlife Resources Commission in an attempt to establish the species as a forage fish for other predator fishes in the lake. This stock has remained and become a favorite target for anglers, though the kokanee population there has recently been hurt by competition from illegally introduced blueback herring.

In Japan, a landlocked relative of Sockeye salmon termed black kokanee, or "kunimasu" in Japanese, was thought to be extinct after 1940, when a hydroelectric project made its native lake in northern Akita Prefecture more acidic. However, the species seems to have been saved by transferring eggs to Saiko Lake in Yamanashi Prefecture, 500 kilometers to the south. This fish has been treated as a subspecies of sockeye Oncorhynchus nerka kawamurae, or even an independent species Oncorhynchus kawamurae.

== Diet ==
Sockeye salmon use patterns of limnetic feeding behavior, which encompasses vertical movement, schooling, diel feeding chronology, and zooplankton prey selectivity. They can change their position in the water column, timing and length of feeding, school formation, and choice of prey to minimize the likelihood of predation. This also ensures they still get at least the minimum amount of food necessary to survive. All of these behaviors contribute to the survivability, and therefore fitness of the salmon. Depending on location and threat of predation, the levels of aggressive feeding behavior can vary.

Sockeye salmon, unlike other species of Pacific salmon, feed extensively on zooplankton during both freshwater and saltwater life stages. They also tend to feed on small aquatic organisms such as shrimp. Insects and occasionally snails are part of their diets at the juvenile stage.

== Life cycle ==
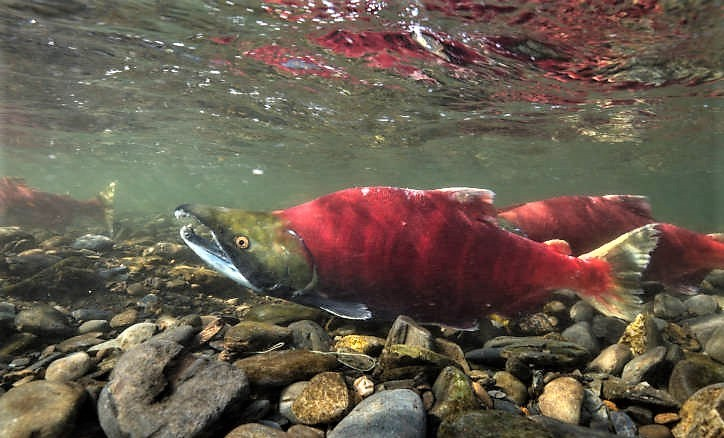
Male sockeye salmon

Sockeye salmon exhibit many different life histories with the majority being anadromous where the juvenile salmon migrate from freshwater lakes and streams to the ocean before returning as adults to their natal freshwater to spawn. Similar to most Pacific salmon, sockeye salmon are semelparous, meaning they die after spawning once. Some sockeye, called kokanee, do not migrate to the ocean and live their entire lives in freshwater lakes. The majority of sockeye spawn in rivers near lakes and juveniles will spend one to two years in the lake before migrating to the ocean, although some populations will migrate to saltwater in their first year. Adult sockeye will spend two to three years in the ocean before returning to freshwater. Females will spawn in 3–5 redds over a period of several days. The eggs usually hatch within six to nine weeks and the fry typically rear in lakes before migrating to the ocean.

== Reproduction ==
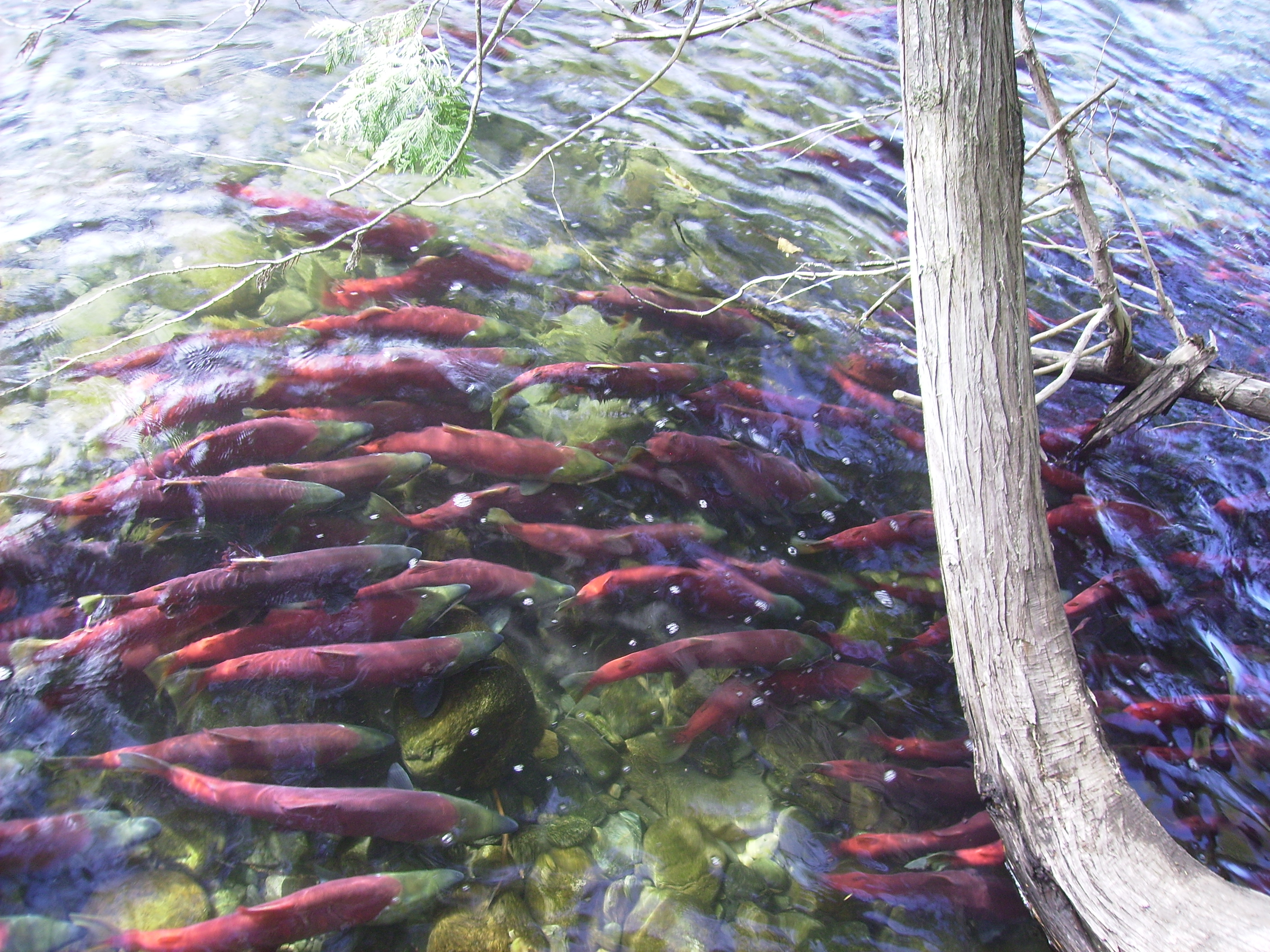
Spawning sockeye salmon

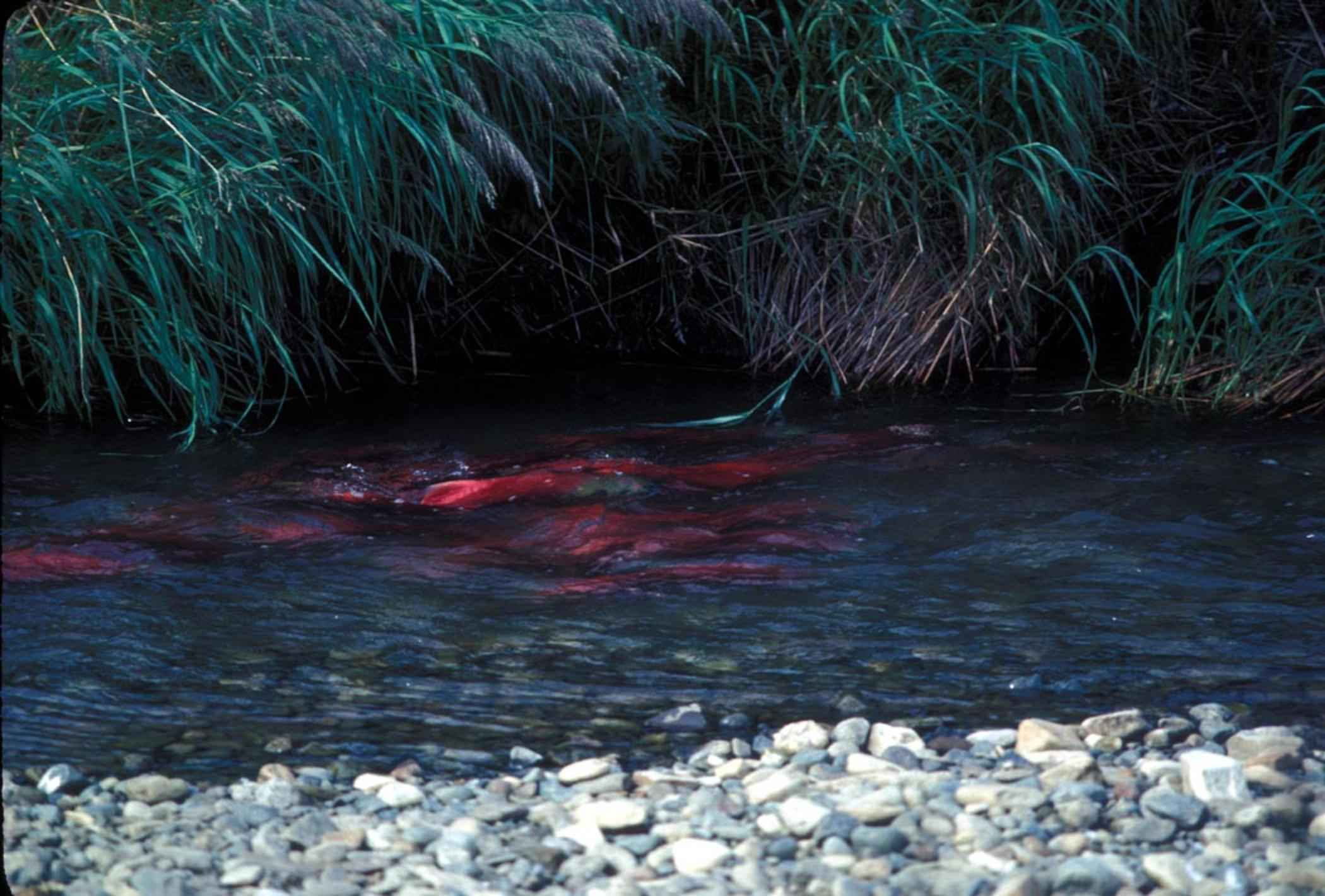
Spawning bed

Males partake in competitive and sneaking tactics, formation of hierarchies, and non-hierarchical groupings around females who are ready to mate. Reproductive success varies more in males than females. The greater variability in male reproduction is associated with the greater average size and exaggerated shape of males. Reproductive success in females is determined by the number of eggs she lays, her body size, and the survival of the eggs, which is due in part to the quality of the nest environment. Male spatial distribution depends on shifts in reproductive opportunities, physical traits of breeding sites, as well as the operational sex ratio of the environment.

Non-dominant males adopt a subordinate behavior, acting as a satellite to mated pairs. During spawning, a subordinate male will move quickly into the redd and release their sperm. Nearby dominant males from other redds will also do this. Male social status is positively correlated to length and dorsal hump size. Larger females tend to spawn in shallower water, which is preferred over deeper water.

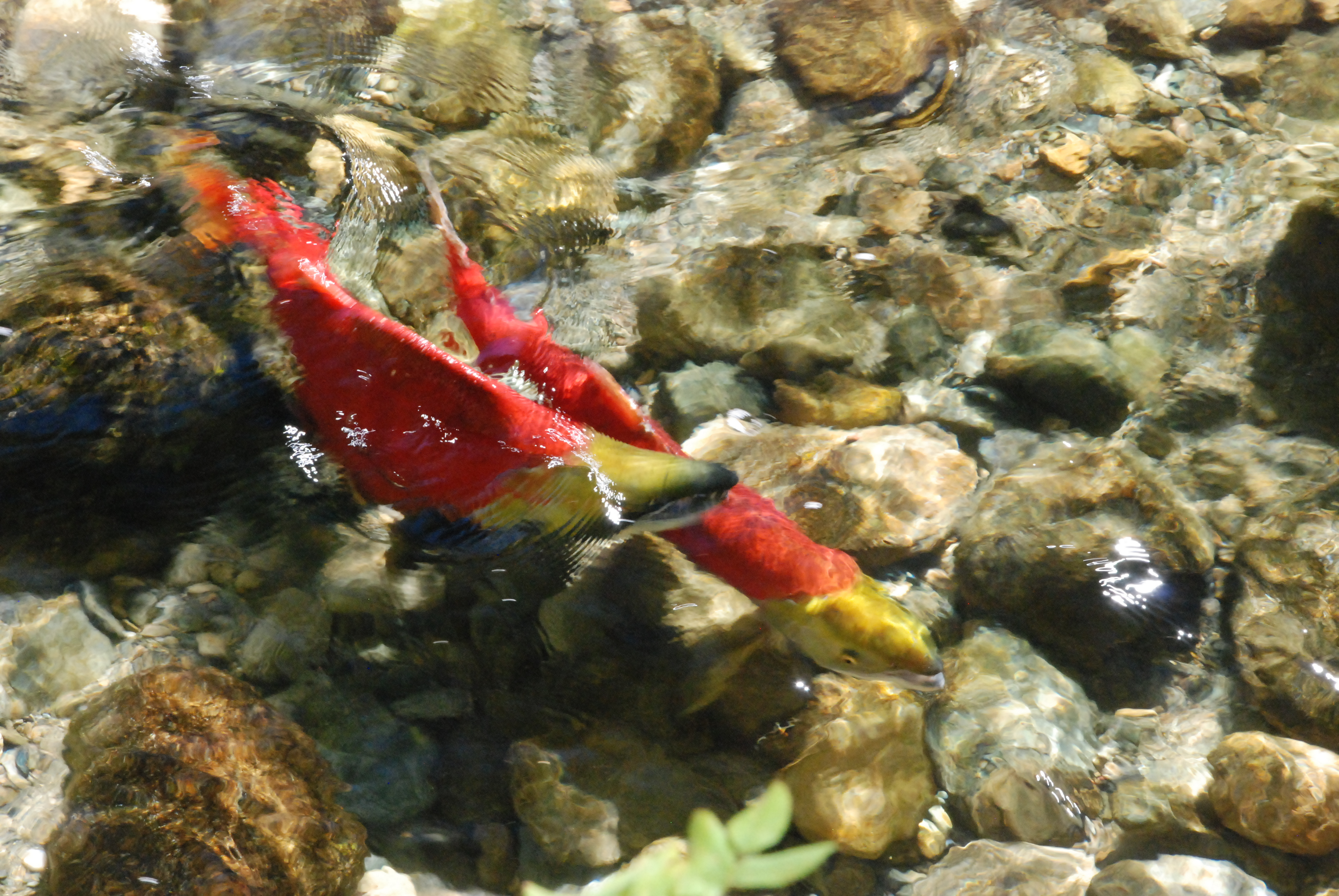
A male (left) and female (right) sockeye salmon spawning in the Adams River of British Columbia, Canada.

There is a dramatic sexual dimorphism at maturity. Males go through numerous morphological changes at maturation including an increase in body depth, hump height, and snout length. Snout size also increases in females, but hump height and adipose fin length do not increase. This could mean that longer snout sizes are sexually selected, but hump height and adipose fin length are not. Females develop large gonads that are about 25% of the body mass.

Females are responsible for parental care. They select, prepare, and defend a nest site until they die or are displaced. Males do not participate in parental care at all, and they move between females after egg deposition.

=== Sexual selection and natural selection ===
Sexual selection favors large males and females. Males choose females based on their readiness to spawn and their size in order to maximize their breeding opportunities. Larger bodies allow females to reproduce larger and more numerous eggs, better nest choice and ability to defend it, and the ability to bury eggs deeper and provide more protection. Females vary their breeding rate depending on the size of the courting male, mating more quickly with larger males. This increases the likelihood that larger males will displace attending, smaller males. Male sockeye salmon social status and greater reproductivity are directly associated with larger body size and more extreme body shapes; Larger bodies provide males with advantages when it comes to intrasexual competition and being selected for by females during reproduction. Males preferentially spawn with females who are red, which is the usual color of females. Even small changes in wavelength, saturation, and brightness can affect preference.

Some traits that lead to reproductive success, such as body size and sexual dimorphism can affect one's survival. This leads to opposing pressures of natural selection and sexual selection. Larger males are favored, unless the risk of predation is very high. Sockeye salmon that die prematurely from predation are typically the larger ones in a population. This shows natural selection against large bodies. Populations with higher levels of predation tend to evolve smaller body size. Without the threat of predation, salmon that breed early in the season live longer than those that breed late in the season.

Other ecological factors like stranding effect select for smaller body size in sockeye salmon when present in a habitat. Stranding is when salmon swim into dry land or shallow water during their migration for spawning and die from suffocation. In fact, studies show that the sockeye salmon with the largest bodies are most susceptible to stranding mortality.

=== Energy cost ===
Reproduction is marked by depletion in energy stores. Fat, protein, and somatic energy stores decrease from the final moments in marine migration through freshwater entry, spawning, and death. Sockeye salmon do not feed during reproduction. Feeding ends once they enter into freshwater, which can be several months before spawning. Embryos are maintained with only endogenous food supplies for about 3–8 months. Reproduction in the sockeye salmon has to be accomplished with the energy stores brought to the spawning grounds. How the salmon use their energy during migration and spawning affects how successful they will be reproductively; energy used for migration cannot also be used for courtship. If they waste too much energy, they might not be able to spawn. Males must also make the decision whether to invest energy in fighting for a female or for longevity on the spawning grounds. Sockeye salmon with longer and more difficult migration routes produce fewer eggs on the spawning grounds. High water temperatures also increase the energy expenditure of sockeye salmon as they migrate upriver.

== Competition ==
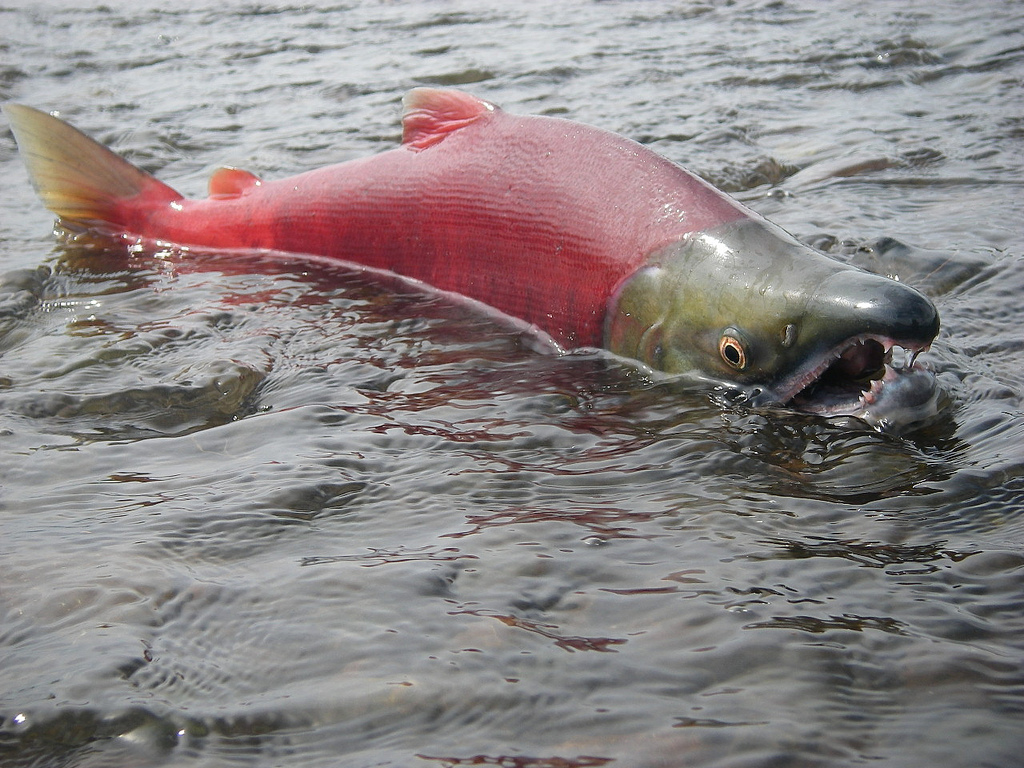
Male sockeye salmon

Aggressive behavior displayed by dominant males is predominantly directed towards intruding dominant males. Sometimes sockeye salmon males behave aggressively towards subordinate males. These encounters are short, with the intruding male leaving after one or two aggressive interactions. Spawning females direct their aggression primarily towards intruding females or other spawning females that are close by. However, they may also direct aggression towards intruding or subordinate males. Aggressive interactions between females only last one or two charges and/or chases. The intruder retreats and the spawning female settles back in her redd. These acts of aggression are important in terms of reproductive success, because they determine the quality of the nest site the female obtains and access to males.

Competition for food or space while the salmon are in their lake residence period can exist. This happens when there is a more populous class of young sockeye or when there are multiple classes present. It can also happen when resources are in short supply. Interspecific competition can also occur and can lead to interactive segregation, which is when species emphasize their differences in diet and habitat to avoid competition. Interspecific competition can affect the growth rates of the salmon if their access to resources is limited.

== Fisheries and consumption ==
Global capture production of Sockeye(=Red) salmon (Oncorhynchus nerka) in thousand tonnes from 1950 to 2022, as reported by the FAO

The total registered fisheries harvest of the sockeye in 2010 was some 170,000 tonnes, of which 115,000 tonnes were from the United States and the rest was equally divided between Canada and Russia. This corresponds to some 65 million fish in all, and to some 19% of the harvest of all Pacific salmon species by weight.

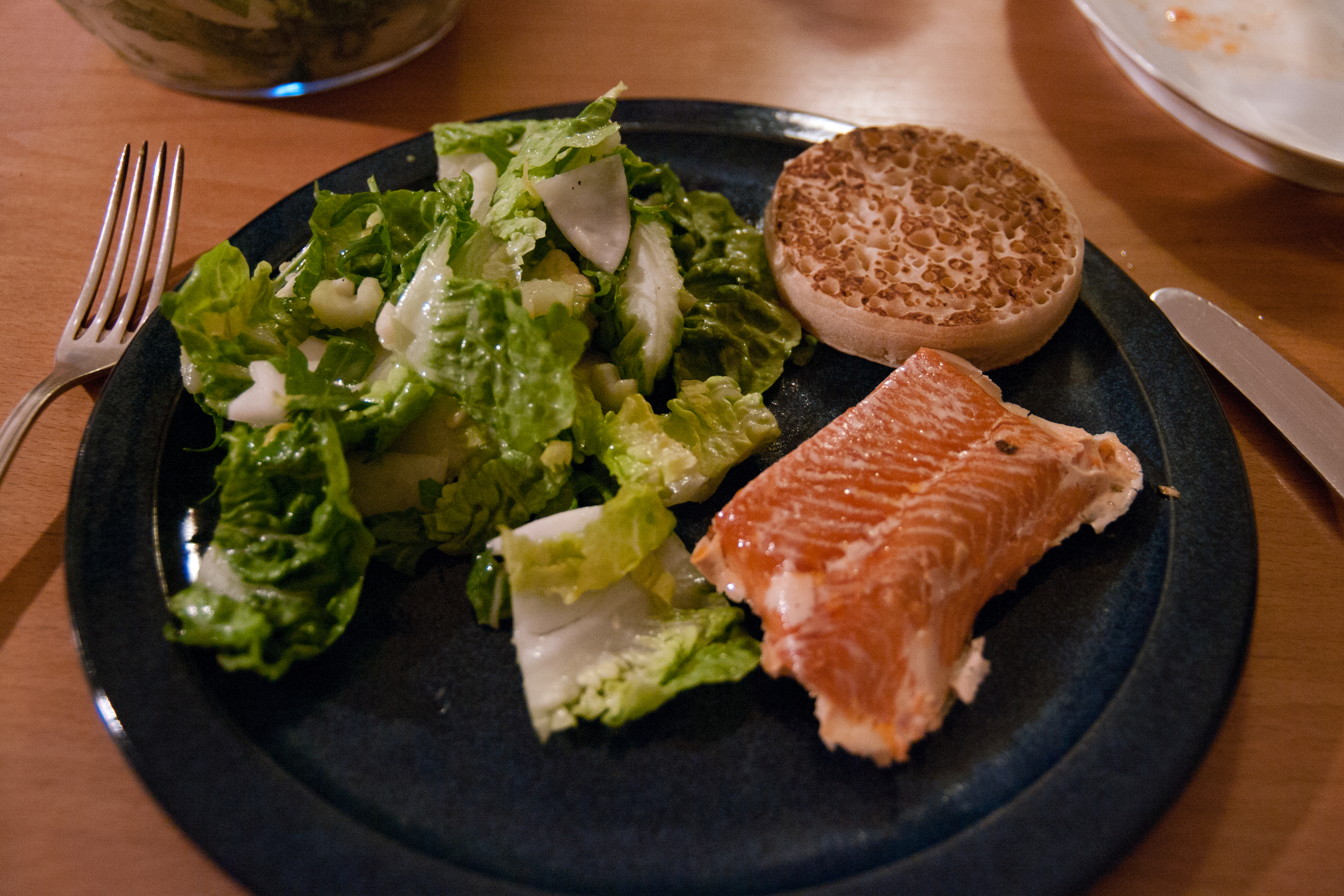
Smoked sockeye salmon ready for consumption

Commercial fishermen in Alaska net this species using seines and gillnets for fresh or frozen fillet sales and canning. The annual catch can reach 30 million fish in Bristol Bay, Alaska, which is the site of the world's largest sockeye harvest.

Sockeye salmon have long been important in the diet and culture of the Coast Salish people of British Columbia.

The largest spawning grounds in Asia are located on the Kamchatka Peninsula of the Russian Far East, especially on the Ozernaya River of the Kurile Lake, which accounts for nearly 90% of all Asian sockeye salmon production, and is recognized as the largest spawning ground outside of Alaska. Illegal fishing in Kamchatka is subject to environmental concern.

Sockeye is almost never farmed. A facility in Langley, BC harvested its first salmon in March 2013, and continues to harvest farmed salmon from its inland facility.

== Conservation status ==
=== United States ===
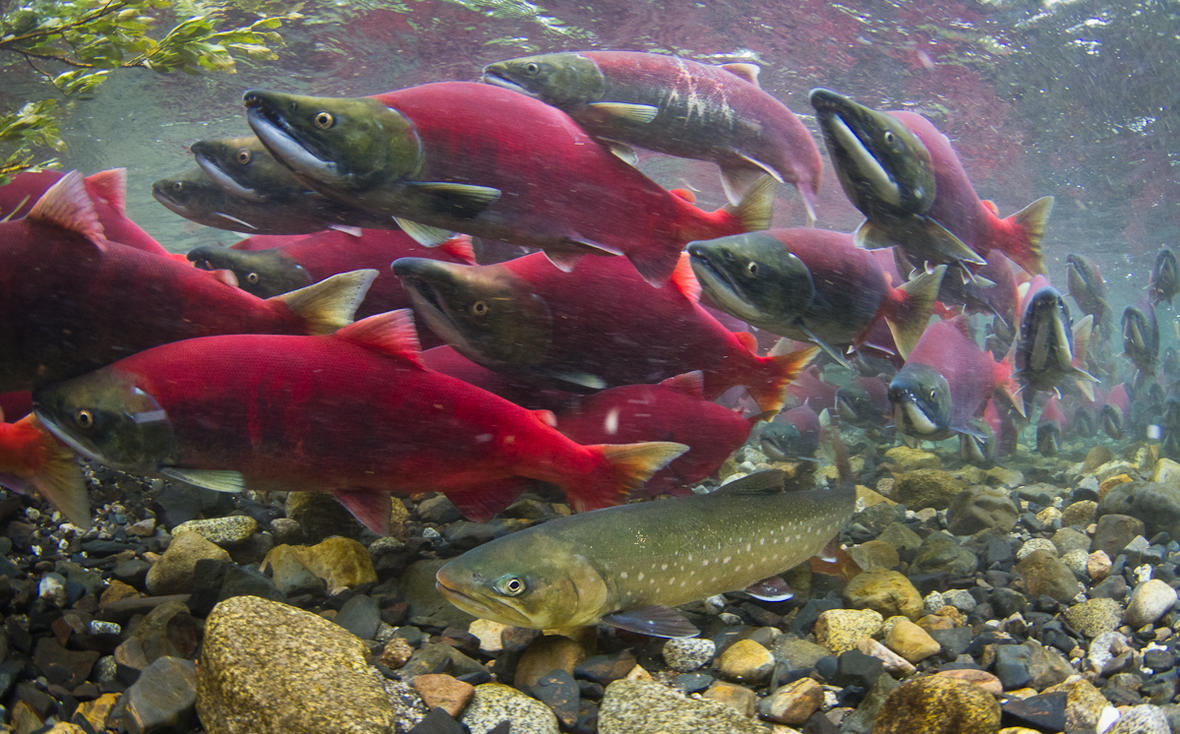
A school of sockeyes swimming upstream to spawn. In the foreground, an arctic char waits.

United States sockeye salmon populations are currently listed under the US Endangered Species Act by the National Marine Fisheries Service as an endangered species in the Snake River and as a threatened species in Lake Ozette, Washington. The Snake River sockeye salmon was listed as endangered in November 1991, after the Shoshone-Bannock Tribe at Fort Hall Indian Reservation petitioned the National Marine Fisheries Service.

Sockeye is an exception to 2010's forecast resurgence of Oregonian fish stocks. Spring Chinook, summer steelhead, and Coho are forecast to increase by up to 100% over 2008 populations. The sockeye population peaked at over 200,000 in 2008 and were forecast to decline to just over 100,000 in 2010. As an early indication of the unexpectedly high sockeye run in 2010, on July 2, 2010, the United States Army Corps of Engineers reported over 300,000 sockeye had passed over Bonneville Dam on the Columbia River. Lower temperatures in 2008 North Pacific waters brought in fatter plankton, which, along with greater outflows of Columbia River water, fed the resurgent populations.

Proposed legislative efforts, such as the Northern Rockies Ecosystem Protection Act, are attempting to protect the headwaters of the sockeye salmon by preventing industrial development in roadless areas.

Record numbers of a once-waning population of sockeye salmon have been returning to the Northwest's Columbia Basin (as of June 2012), with thousands more crossing the river's dams in a single day than the total numbers seen in some previous years.

=== Canada ===
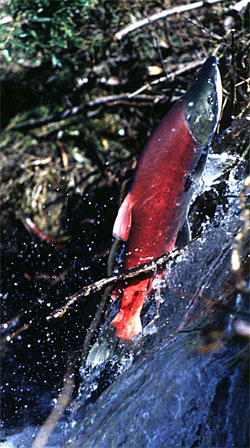
Sockeye salmon jumping over a beaver dam, Aleknagik Lake, Alaska, United States

The conservation status of sockeye populations in Canada is under review by Fisheries and Oceans Canada as part of its Wild Salmon Policy strategy to standardize monitoring of wild salmon status. Salmon runs of particular note are the Skeena and Nass river runs, and the most famous is the Fraser River sockeye run.

The Fraser River salmon run has experienced declines in productivity since the 1990s, mirroring a similar decline in the 1960s.

The return abundance (population) of Fraser River sockeye in 2009 was estimated at a very low 1,370,000, 13% of the pre-season forecast of 10,488,000. That represented a decline from the recent (1993) historical cycle peak of 23,631,000 and the return abundance was the lowest in over 50 years. The reasons for this (former) decline remain speculative. According to a consortium of scientists assembled to review the problem, the decline highlights the uncertainty in forecasting salmon returns. After the low returns, the Government of Canada launched a formal inquiry into the decline, the Commission of Inquiry into the Decline of Sockeye Salmon in the Fraser River.

The Commission has been tasked with investigating all the factors which may affect Fraser River sockeye salmon throughout their life cycle. According to the terms of reference, the subjects of investigation are "the impact of environmental changes along the Fraser River, marine environmental conditions, aquaculture, predators, diseases, water temperature and other factors that may have affected the ability of sockeye salmon to reach traditional spawning grounds or reach the ocean."

During the commission, hundreds of thousands of documents and scientific research papers were reviewed. Twelve technical reports were published using that information, looking at the possible impacts of diseases and parasites, hatchery diseases, contaminants, marine ecology, salmon farms, fisheries, predators, climate change and government management on the productivity of Fraser River sockeye runs.

While the commission was holding public hearings, in the late summer of 2010, the largest run of sockeye since 1913 returned to the Fraser River system. Final counts show that approximately 30 million salmon returned to the Fraser River and its tributaries in 2010. In total, approximately 11,591,000 Fraser sockeye were caught by Canadian fishers and 1,974,000 Fraser sockeye were caught by American fishers. The final projected escapement (fish which were not caught) was 15,852,990 fish.

Recent unpredictable fluctuations in runs are speculated to be due to changing water temperatures. There is high variation in thermal tolerance among the different sockeye salmon populations that migrate up the Fraser River. The Chilko River sockeye salmon population is able to maintain cardiorespiratory function at higher temperatures, which may make them more resilient to the effects of rising river temperatures. In one study examining possible physiological mechanisms underlying these population differences in thermal tolerance, juvenile sockeye salmon from the Chilko River and Weaver Creek did not show any differences in force-frequency response of the heart or cardiac pumping capacity when reared in common garden temperatures at 5 °C and 14 °C. Therefore, the physiology underlying these differences in thermal tolerance has yet to be determined.

== Gallery ==
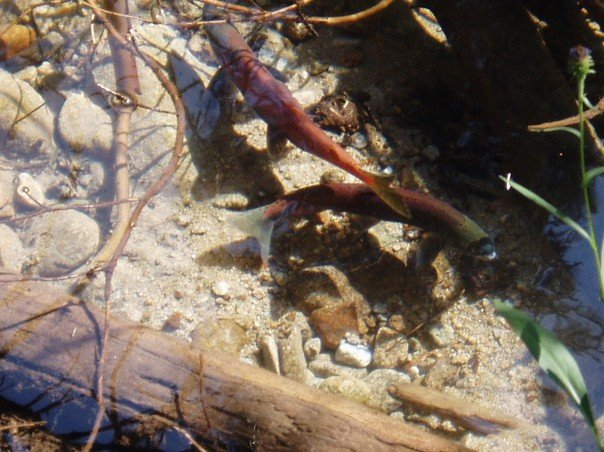
Spawning Kokanee salmon in the Sawtooth Range of Idaho

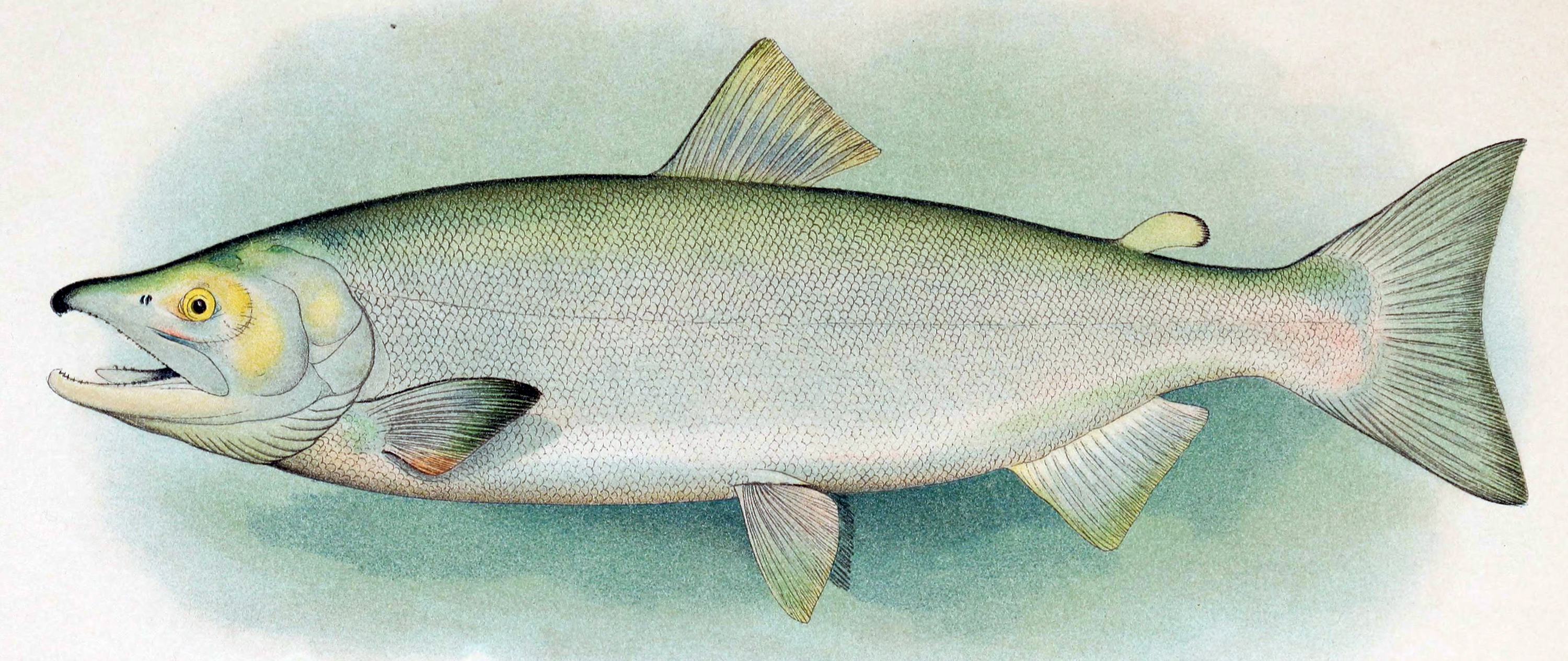
Male ocean-phase sockeye

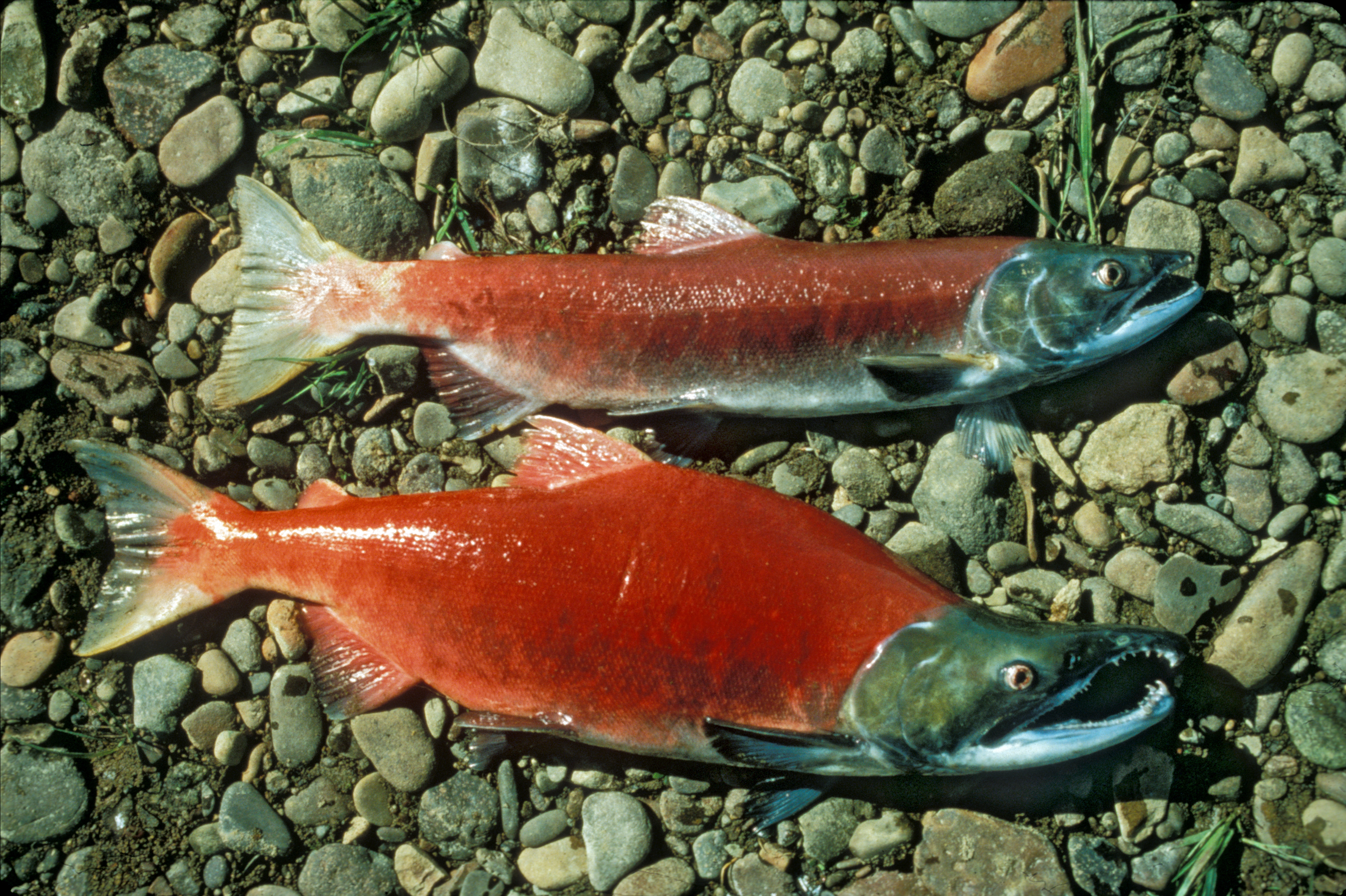
Female (top) and male (bottom) in spawning colors

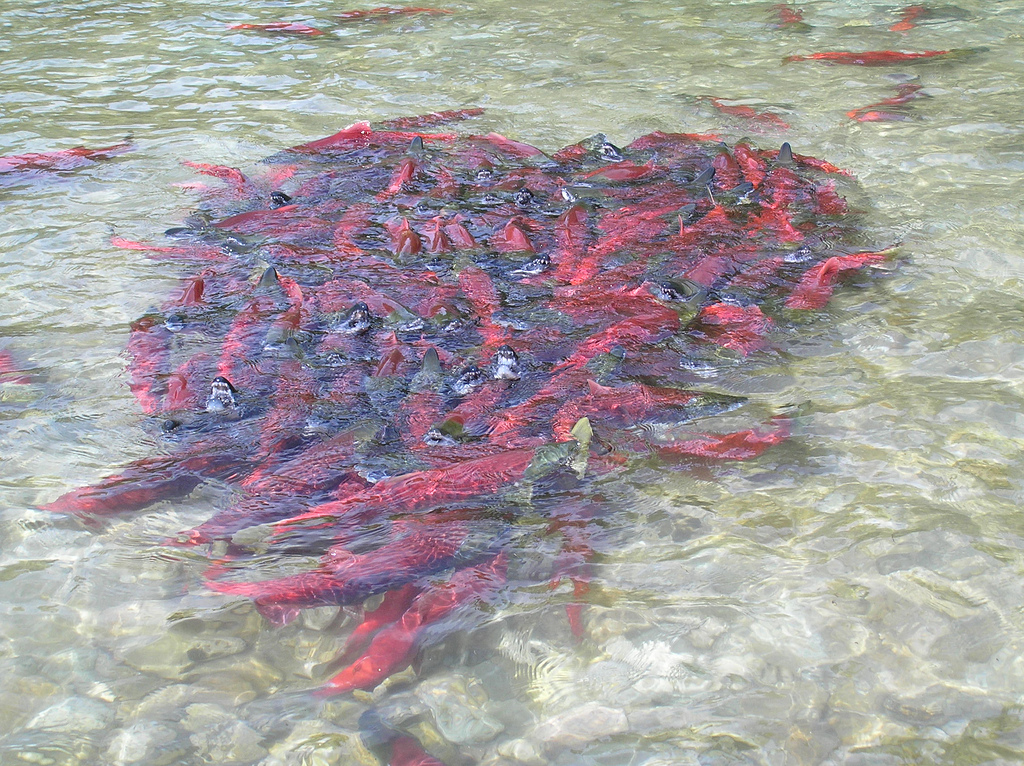
Sockeye salmon in Bristol Bay, Alaska

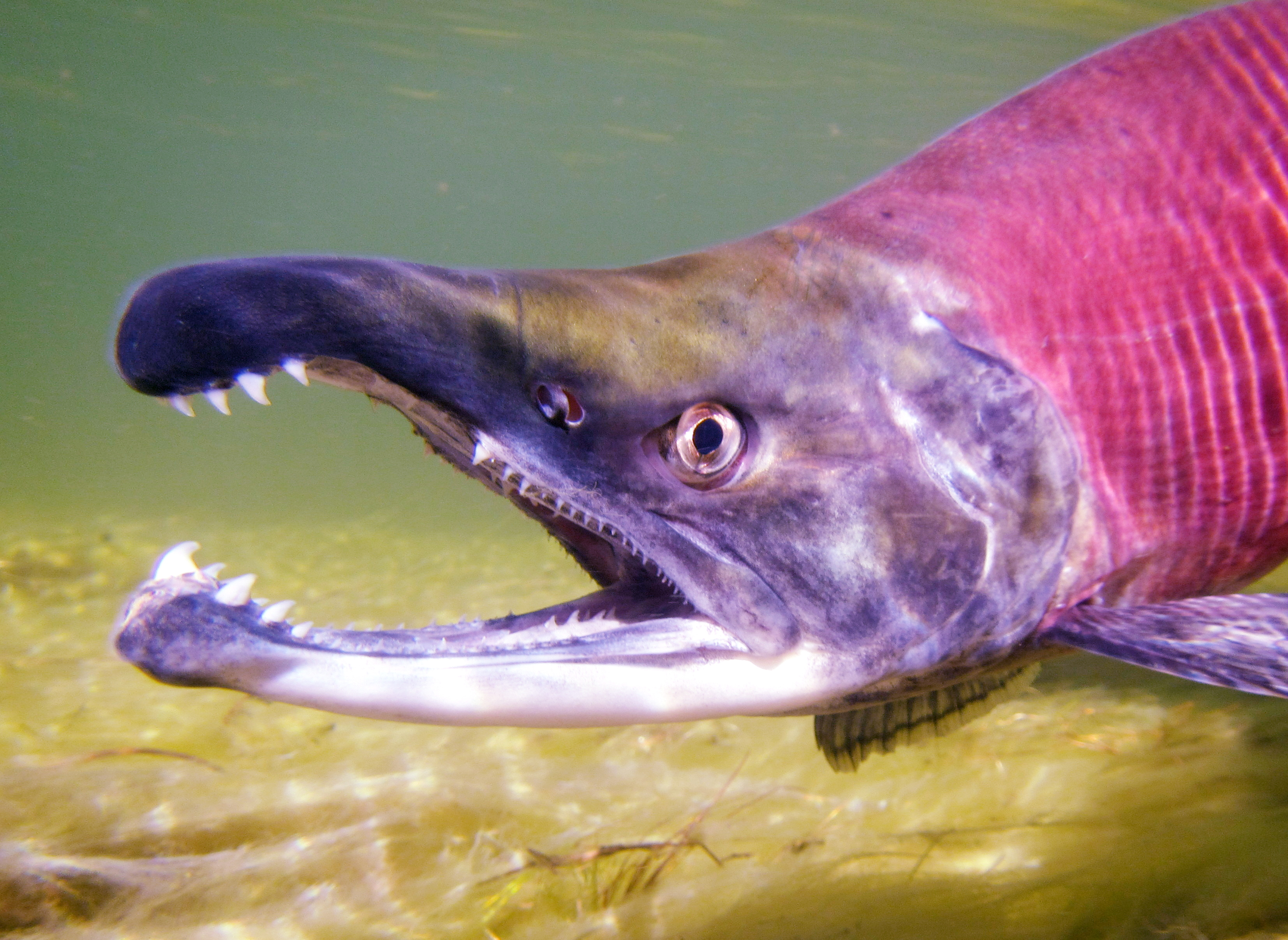
Closeup of a kokanee salmon
