= Coast Salish peoples =

Related Indigenous peoples of the Pacific Northwest Coast

- Distribution of Coast Salish and Tsamosan languages in the early 19th century

Regions with significant populations
- United States, Canada
- British Columbia, Canada: 28,406
- Washington, United States: 28,284

Languages
- Coast Salish languages

Related ethnic groups
- Other Indigenous peoples of the Northwest Coast, other Salish peoples

The Coast Salish peoples are a group of ethnically and linguistically related Indigenous peoples of the Pacific Northwest Coast, living in the Canadian province of British Columbia and the U.S. states of Washington and Oregon. They speak the Coast Salish languages and Tsamosan languages.

The Coast Salish are a large, loose grouping of many nations with numerous distinct cultures and languages. Territory claimed by Coast Salish peoples span from the northern limit of the Salish Sea on the inside of Vancouver Island and covers most of southern Vancouver Island, all of the Lower Mainland and most of Puget Sound and the Olympic Peninsula (except for territories of the Chemakum people). Their traditional territories coincide with modern major metropolitan areas, namely Victoria, Vancouver, and Seattle. The Tillamook or Nehalem around Tillamook, Oregon are the southernmost of the Coast Salish peoples.

Coast Salish cultures differ considerably from those of their northern neighbors. They have a patrilineal and matrilineal kinship system, with inheritance and descent passed through the male and female line. According to a 2012 estimate, the population of Coast Salish numbers at least 56,590 people, made of 28,406 Status Indians registered to Coast Salish bands in British Columbia, and 28,284 enrolled members of federally recognized tribes of Coast Salish in Washington State.

== Terminology ==
The term "Coast Salish" is used to refer to the speakers of fourteen contiguous Salishan languages on the western coast of North America. This definition sometimes extends to include the nearby communities of speakers of the Salishan languages Tillamook and Nuxalk. Usage of the term "Coast Salish" to refer to these peoples began in the late 19th century.

The name "Salish" comes from the Salish people of Montana, who are also known as the Bitterroot Salish or Flathead. Their language, Montana Salish, is an Interior Salish language and the easternmost Salishan language.

== Classification ==
The Coast Salish culture group can be broken up into four main subgroupings:

=== Northern Coast Salish ===
- Homalco
- Klahoose
- Island Kʼómoks (historically) (Note: The Comox were historically Coast Salish, however they were culturally absorbed by the neighboring Lekwiltok)
- Pentlatch
- shíshálh (Sechelt)
- Tla'amin (Sliammon)

=== Central Coast Salish ===
- Cowichan
- Esquimalt
- Halalt
- Hwlitsum
- Klallam (S'Klallam)
- Lekwungen (Songhees)
- Lummi
- Musqueam
- Nooksack
- Penelakut
- Saanich
- Samish
- Semiahmoo
- Snuneymuxw (Nanaimo)
- Squamish
- Stz'uminus (Chemainus)
- Stó꞉lō
- T'Sou-ke (Sooke)
- Tsawwassen
- Tsleil-Waututh

=== Southern Coast Salish ===
- Duwamish
- Nisqually
- Puyallup
- Sauk-Suiattle
- Snohomish
- Snoqualmie
- Squaxin Island
- Stillaguamish
- Suquamish
- Swinomish
- Twana
- Upper Skagit

=== Southwestern Coast Salish ===
- Quinault
- Lower Chehalis
- Upper Chehalis
- Cowlitz

== History ==
Evidence has been found from c. 3000 BCE of an established settlement at X̱á:ytem (Hatzic Rock) near Mission, British Columbia. Early occupancy of c̓əsnaʔəm (Marpole Midden) is evident from c. 2000 BCE – 450 CE, and lasted at least until around the late 1800s, when smallpox and other diseases affected the inhabitants. Other notable early settlements that record has been found of include prominent villages along the Duwamish River estuary dating back to the 6th century CE, which remained continuously inhabited until sometime in the later 18th century. Boulder walls were constructed for defensive and other purposes along the Fraser Canyon in the 15th century.

Early European contact with Coast Salish peoples dates back to exploration of the Strait of Georgia in 1791 by Juan Carrasco and José María Narváez, as well as brief contact with the Vancouver expedition by the Squamish people in 1792. In 1808, Simon Fraser of the North West Company entered Coast Salish territories via the Fraser Canyon and met various groups until reaching tidewater on the Fraser's North Arm, where he was attacked and repelled by Musqueam warriors. Throughout the 1810s, coastal fur trade extended further with infrequent shipping.

The establishment of Fort Vancouver in 1824 was important as it established a regular site of interaction with Clackamas, Multnomah, and Cascades Chinooks, as well as interior Klickitat, Cowlitz, Kalapuya. Parties from the Hudson's Bay Company (HBC), led by John Work, travelled the length of the central and south Georgia Strait-Puget Sound.

From the 1810s through to the 1850s, Coast Salish groups of Georgia Strait and Puget Sound experienced raiding from northern peoples, particularly the Euclataws and Haida.

In 1827, HBC established Fort Langley east of present-day Vancouver, B.C. Whattlekainum, principal chief of the Kwantlen people, moved most of his people from Qiqayt (Brownsville) across the river from what was to become New Westminster to Kanaka Creek, near the Fort, for security and to dominate trade with the Fort. European contact and trade began accelerating significantly, primarily with the Fraser River Salish (Sto:lo).

Fort Nisqually and its farm were established in 1833 by the Puget Sound Agricultural Company a subsidiary of the HBC, between present-day Olympia and Tacoma, Washington. Contact and trade began accelerating significantly with the southern Coast Salish. Significant social change and change in social structures accelerates with increasing contact. Initiative remained with Native traders until catastrophic population decline. Native traders and Native economy were not particularly interested or dependent upon European trade or tools. Trade goods were primarily luxuries such as trade blankets, ornamentation, guns and ammunition. The HBC monopoly did not condone alcohol, but freebooter traders were under no compunction.

Catholic missionaries arrive in Puget Sound around 1839–1840; interest diminished by 1843, and Methodist missionaries were in the area from 1840 to 1842 but had no success.

The Stevens Treaties were negotiated in 1854–55, but many tribes had reservations and did not participate; others dropped out of treaty negotiations. (See, for example, Treaty of Point Elliott#Native Americans and # Non-signatory tribes.) From 1850 to 1854, the Douglas Treaties were signed on Vancouver Island between various Coast Salish peoples around Victoria and Nanaimo, and also with two Kwakwaka'wakw groups on northern Vancouver Island. The Muckleshoot Reservation was established after the Puget Sound War of 1855–56.

Through the 1850s and 1860s, traditional resources became less and less available. Sawmill work and employment selling natural resources began; Native men worked as loggers, in the mills, and as commercial fishers. Women sold basketry and shellfish. Through the 1870s, agricultural work in hop yards of the east Sound river valley increased, including cultivation of mushrooms. The 1862 Pacific Northwest smallpox epidemic killed many, and commercial fisheries employment began to decline significantly through the 1880s.

After legislation amending the Indian Act was passed the previous year, in 1885 the potlatch was banned in Canada; it was banned in the US some years later. This suppression ended in the US in 1934, and in 1951 in Canada. Some potlatching became overt immediately. A resurgence of tribal culture began in the 1960s; national Civil Rights movements engendered civil action for treaty rights.

Chief Dan George delivered a pivotal speech in 1967 on what had happened to his people. This riveted audiences at a Canadian Centennial ceremony in Vancouver's Empire Stadium and touched off public awareness and Native activism in BC and Canada. By this point, through the 1960s and 1970s, employment in commercial fisheries had greatly declined; employment in logging and lumber mills also declined significantly with automation, outsourcing, and the decline in available resources through the 1980s.

The Boldt Decision, passed in 1974 upheld by the Supreme Court in 1979 was, based on the Treaty of Point Elliott of 1855 and restored fisheries rights to federally recognized Puget Sound tribes.

Since the 1970s, many federally recognized tribes have developed some economic autonomy with (initially strongly contested) tax-free tobacco retail, development of casino gambling, fisheries and stewardship of fisheries. Extant tribes not federally recognized continue ongoing legal proceedings and cultural development toward recognition. In British Columbia, 1970 marks the start of organized resistance to the "white paper" tabled by Jean Chrétien, then a cabinet minister in the government of Pierre Trudeau, which called for assimilation. In the wake of that, new terms such as Sto:lo, Shishalh and Snuneymuxw began to replace older-era names conferred by anthropologists, linguists and governments.

=== Population ===
The first smallpox epidemic to hit the region was in the 1680s, with the disease travelling overland from Mexico by intertribal transmission. Among losses due to diseases, and a series of earlier epidemics that had wiped out many peoples entirely, e.g. the Snokomish in 1850, a smallpox epidemic broke out among the Northwest tribes in 1862, killing roughly half the affected Native people, in some cases up to 90% or more. The smallpox epidemic of 1862 started when an infected miner from San Francisco stopped in Victoria on his way to the Cariboo Gold Rush. As the epidemic spread, police, supported by gunboats, forced thousands of First Nations people living in encampments around Victoria to leave and many returned to their home villages which spread the epidemic. Some consider the decision to force First Nations people to leave their encampments an intentional act of genocide. Mean population decline 1774–1874 was about 66%. Though the Salish peoples together are less numerous than the Cherokee or Navajo, the numbers shown below represent a small fraction of the group.

- Pre-epidemics about 12,600; Lushootseed about 11,800, Twana about 800.
- 1850: about 5,000.
- 1885: less than 2,000, probably not including all the off-reservation populations.
- 1984: sum total about 18,000; Lushootseed census 15,963; Twana 1,029.
- 2013: an estimate of at least 56,590, made up of 28,406 Status Indians registered to Coast Salish bands in British Columbia, and 28,284 enrolled members of Coast Salish Tribes in Washington state.

== Culture ==
=== Social organization ===
==== External ====
Neighboring peoples, whether villages or adjacent tribes, were related by marriage, feasting, ceremonies, and common or shared territory. Ties were especially strong within the same waterway or watershed. There existed no breaks throughout the south Coast Salish culture area and beyond. There were no formal political institutions.

External relations were extensive throughout most of the Puget Sound-Georgia Basin and east to the Sahaptin-speaking lands of Chelan, Kittitas and Yakama in what is now Eastern Washington. Similarly in Canada there were ties between the Squamish people and Sto:lo with Interior Salish neighbors, i.e. the Lil'wat/St'at'imc, Nlaka'pamux and Syilx.

No formal political office existed. Warfare for the southern Coast Salish was primarily defensive, with occasional raiding into territory where there were no relatives. No institutions existed for mobilizing or maintaining a standing force.

The common enemies of all the Coast Salish for most of the first half of the 19th century were the Lekwiltok aka Southern Kwakiutl, commonly known in historical writings as the Euclataws or Yucultas. Regular raids by northern tribes, particularly warriors of an alliance among the Haida, Tongass, and one group of Tsimshian, are also notable. Having gained superiority by earlier access to European guns through the fur trade, these warriors raided the southern Salish tribes for slaves and loot. Their victims organized retaliatory raids several times, attacking the Lekwiltok.

==== Internal ====
The highest-ranking male assumed the role of ceremonial leader but rank could vary and was determined by different standards. Villages were linked through intermarriage among members; the wife usually went to live at the husband's village, in a patrilocal pattern. Society was divided into upper class, lower class and slaves, all largely hereditary. Nobility was based on genealogy, intertribal kinship, wise use of resources, and possession of esoteric knowledge about the workings of spirits and the world — making an effective marriage of class, secular, religious, and economic power. Many Coast Salish mothers altered the appearance of their free-born by carefully shaping the heads of their babies, binding them with cradle boards just long enough to produce a steep sloping forehead.

Unlike hunter-gatherer societies widespread in North America, but similar to other Pacific Northwest coastal cultures, Coast Salish society was complex, hierarchical and oriented toward property and status.

Slavery was practiced, although its extent is a matter of debate. The Coast Salish held slaves as simple property; they were not members of the tribe. The children of slaves were born into slavery.

The staple of their diet was typically salmon, supplemented with a rich variety of other seafoods and forage. This was particularly the case for the southern Coast Salish, where the climate of their territories was even more temperate.

Bilateral kinship within the Skagit people is the most important system being defined as a carefully knit, and sacred bond within the society. When both adult siblings die, their children would be brought under the protection of surviving brothers and sisters, out of fear of mistreatment by stepparents.

The Salish Sea region of the Northwest coast has produced ancient pieces of art appearing by 4500 BP that feature various Salish styles recognizable in more recent historical works. A seated human feature bowl was used in a female puberty ritual in Secwépemc territory; it was believed to aid women in giving birth.

Salish-made bowls in the Northwest have different artistic designs and features. Numerous bowls have basic designs with animal features on the surface. Similar bowls will have more decorations including a head, body, wings, and limbs. A seated figure bowl is more complex in design, depicting humans being intertwined with animals.

For thousands of years, Northwest coast Salish people demonstrated valuing material possessions. They believe that material wealth included land, food resources, household items, and adornments. Material wealth not only improved one's life but it enhanced other qualities such as those needed to acquire high status. Wealth was required to enhance their status as elite born, or through practical skills, and ritual knowledge. An individual could not buy status or power, but wealth could be used to enhance them. Wealth was not meant to be hidden. It has been publicly displayed through ceremony.

==== Recreation ====
Games often involved gambling on a sleight-of-hand game known as slahal, as well as athletic contests. Games that are similar to modern day lacrosse, rugby and forms of martial arts also existed.

==== Beliefs ====
Belief in guardian spirits and shapeshifting or transformation between human and animal spirits were widely shared in many forms. The relations of soul or souls, and conceptions of the lands of the living and the dead were complex and mutable. Vision quest journeys involving other states of consciousness were varied and widely practised. The Duwamish had a soul recovery and journey ceremony.

The Quileute Salish people near Port Townsend had their own beliefs about where souls of all living things go. The shamans of these people believed everything had five components to its spirit; the body, an inner and outer soul, its life force, and its ghost. They believed that an individual becomes ill when their soul is removed from their body and this is followed by death when the soul reaches the underworld. It is the job of the shaman to travel to the underworld to save the individual by recovering the soul while it is travelling between the two worlds.

The shamans believed that once an individual's body was dead it was able to connect with its soul and shade in the underworld. It is believed that the spirits are able to come back amongst the living and cause family members to die of sickness and join them in the afterlife. Living individuals were terrified of the intentions of spirits, who only appear at night, prompting Salish people to travel only during the day and stay close to others for protection. Coastal Salish beliefs describe the journey to the underworld as a two-day adventure. The individual must walk along a trail passing through bushes and a lake to reach a valley that is divided by a river where they will reside. Salish beliefs about the afterlife very closely resemble the past life they lived, and they often assign themselves to jobs to keep busy, hunt for animals and game, and live with their families.

Coastal Salish people believe that through dances, masks, or ceremonies they express the spiritual powers that they are given. Spirit powers define a community's success through leadership, bravery, healing, or artistry. Spirit dancing ceremonies are common gatherings in the winter for members of the community to show their spirit powers through song, or dance. The powers they acquired were sought after individually after going through trials of isolation where their powers related to spirit animals such as a raven, woodpecker, bear, or seal. Oftentimes members of the community get together to show their powers on the longhouse floor, where the spiritual powers are for the individual alone for each member to share and display various songs.

=== Architecture ===
Villages of the Coast Salish typically consisted of northwest coast longhouses made with western red cedar split planks and with an earthen floor. They provided habitation for forty or more people, usually a related extended family. Also used by many groups were pit-houses, known in the Chinook Jargon as kekuli (see quiggly holes). The villages were typically located near navigable water for easy transportation by dugout canoe. Houses that were part of the same village sometimes stretched for several miles along a river or watercourse.

The interior walls of longhouses were typically lined with sleeping platforms. Storage shelves above the platforms held baskets, tools, clothing, and other items. Firewood was stored below the platforms. Mattresses and cushions were constructed from woven reed mats and animals skins. Food was hung to dry from the ceiling. The larger houses included partitions to separate families, as well as interior fires with roof slats that functioned as chimneys.

The wealthy built extraordinarily large longhouses. The Suquamish Oleman House (Old Man House) at what became the Port Madison Reservation was 152 x 12–18 m (500 x 40–60 ft), c. 1850. The gambrel roof was unique to Puget Sound Coast Salish.

The Salish later took to constructing rock walls at strategic points near the Fraser River Canyon, along the Fraser River. These Salish Defensive Sites are rock wall features constructed by Coast Salish peoples. One was excavated by Kisha Supernant in 2008 at Yale, British Columbia. The functions of these features may have included defense, fishing platforms, and creation of house terraces. House pits and stone tools have been found in association with certain sites. Methods used include use of a total station for mapping the sites as well as the creation of simple test pits to probe for stratigraphy and artifacts.

Native groups along the Northwest coast have been using plants for making wood and fiber artifacts for over 10,500 years. Anthropologists are searching for aquifer wet sites that would contain ancient Salish villages. These sites are created by a series of waters running through the archaeological deposits creating an environment with no oxygen that preserves wood and fiber The wet sites would typically contain perishable artifacts that were used as wedges, fishhooks, basketry, cordage, and nets.

=== Ethnobotany ===
The Coast Salish use over 100 species of plants. Salal is the source of multiple tinctures and teas, and its berries are often eaten during feasts. They use the leaves of Carex to make baskets and twine.

=== Diet ===
Coast Salish peoples' had complex land management practices linked to ecosystem health and resilience. Forest gardens on Canada's northwest coast included crabapple, hazelnut, cranberry, wild plum, and wild cherry species. There is also documentation of the cultivation of great camas, Indian carrot, and Columbia lily.

Anthropogenic grasslands were maintained. The south Coast Salish may have had more vegetables and land game than people farther north or among other peoples on the outer coast. Salmon and other fish were staples; see Coast Salish people and salmon. There was kakanee, a freshwater fish in the Lake Washington and Lake Sammamish watersheds. Shellfish were abundant. Butter clams, horse clams, and cockles were dried for trade.

Hunting was specialized; professions were probably sea hunters, land hunters, fowlers. Water fowl were captured on moonless nights using strategic flares.

The managed grasslands not only provided game habitat, but vegetable sprouts, roots, bulbs, berries, and nuts were foraged from them as well as found wild. The most important were probably bracken and camas; wapato especially for the Duwamish. Many, many varieties of berries were foraged; some were harvested with comblike devices not reportedly used elsewhere. Acorns were relished but were not widely available. Regional tribes went in autumn to the Nisqually Flats (Nisqually plains) to harvest them.

Salish groups such as Muckleshoot were heavily reliant on seasonal foods that included animals and plants. In January, they would gather along the river banks to catch salmon. By May, Salmonberry sprouts would be eaten with salmon eggs. Men would hunt deer and elk, while women gathered camas and clams from the prairies and beaches. By the summer, steelhead and king salmon appeared in masses along the rivers, and berries were abundant in the forests. This harvesting cycle is referred to as the Seasonal Rounds.

== In literature and TV ==
Legends of Vancouver by Canadian author E. Pauline Johnson (Tekahionwake) is a collection of Coast Salish "as told-to" narratives, stemming from the author's relationship to Squamish Chief Joe Capilano. It first appeared in 1911, now available online from UPenn Digital Library.

Victoria, British Columbia author Stanley Evans has written a series of mysteries featuring a Coast Salish character, Silas Seaweed, from the fictitious "Mohawt Bay Band", who works as an investigator with the Victoria Police Department.

== See also ==
- Indigenous peoples of the Pacific Northwest Coast
- Interior Salish

== Bibliography ==
- Amoss, Pamela. Coast Salish Spirit Dancing: The Survival of an Ancestral Religion. Seattle: University of Washington Press, 1978. ISBN 0-295-95586-4
- Blanchard, Rebecca, and Nancy Davenport. Contemporary Coast Salish Art. Seattle: Stonington Gallery, 2005.
- Granville Miller, Bruce (2011). Be of Good Mind: Essays on the Coast Salish. UBC Press. ISBN 978-0-7748-4089-7.
- Haeberlin, Hermann; Gunther, Erna (September 1930). "The Indians of Puget Sound". University of Washington Publications in Anthropology. 4 (1): 60.
- Porter, Frank W. The Coast Salish Peoples. New York: Chelsea House Publishers, 1989. ISBN 1-55546-701-6
- Pugh, Ellen, and Laszlo Kubinyi. The Adventures of Yoo-Lah-Teen: A Legend of the Salish Coastal Indians. New York: Dial Press, 1975. ISBN 0-8037-6318-2
- Suttles, Wayne (1990). "Introduction". Northwest Coast. Handbook of North American Indians. Vol. 7. Washington, DC: Smithsonian Institution. pp. 1–15.
- Suttles, Wayne; Lane, Barbara (1990). "Southern Coast Salish". Northwest Coast. Handbook of North American Indians. Vol. 7. Smithsonian Institution. pp. 485–502. ISBN 0-16-020390-2.
- Thom, Brian David (2005). Coast Salish senses of place: Dwelling, meaning, power, property and territory in the Coast Salish world. Ph.D. dissertation, McGill University (Canada), Canada. Retrieved: http://hdl.handle.net/10613/32
