= Viola Garfield =

American anthropologist

- Born: December 5, 1899; Des Moines, Iowa, US
- Died: November 25, 1983 (aged 83)

Academic background
- Education: University of Washington

Academic work
- Discipline: anthropology
- Main interests: social organization and plastic arts of the Tsimshian nation

Viola E. Garfield (December 5, 1899 – November 25, 1983) was an American anthropologist best known for her work on the social organization and plastic arts of the Tsimshian nation in British Columbia and Alaska.

== Early life ==
Viola Edmundson was born in Des Moines, Iowa. Her family moved a few years later to Coupeville, Washington, on Whidbey Island, where she attended local schools.

She enrolled at the University of Washington in Seattle beginning in 1919, transferring for financial reasons to what is now Western Washington University in Bellingham, where she became certified as a teacher. She started a position in the 1920s teaching Tsimshian children in Metlakatla, Alaska, on Annette Island. This experience sparked her interest in Pacific Northwest Coast ethnology.

While working at the Seattle Chamber of Commerce, she became the typist for Charles Garfield, an Alaskan former miner and fur trader. They married in 1924.

== Career ==
In 1927 Garfield re-enrolled at the University of Washington. She earned a B.A. in 1928 and an M.A. in anthropology in 1931, with a thesis on Tsimshian marriage patterns, based on fresh fieldwork in Metlakatla. At the U.W. she studied under Erna Gunther. For her Ph.D. work (1931–1933), she transferred graduate courses she took at Columbia University in New York City with Franz Boas and Ruth Benedict.

Through the early 1930s Garfield conducted fieldwork in Lax Kw'alaams, B.C., or Port Simpson, as it was then known. This was the largest of the Canadian Tsimshian communities. Her chief facilitator was William Beynon, the hereditary chief and a trained ethnographic fieldworker. Their work in Port Simpson covered every facet of Tsimshian culture, including social structure—this at the instigation of Boas, whose own Tsimshian monograph had been upstaged by Beynon and Marius Barbeau's published Tsimshian research. Her 1935 dissertation, published in 1939, was Tsimshian Clan and Society.

While in Port Simpson, Garfield was adopted into the Laxsgiik (Eagle clan) and given the Tsimshian name Diiks.

Her later work focused on art and music. She also studied the Tlingit in Alaska, facilitated by her husband, who spoke Chinook Jargon.

For decades until retirement she taught at the University of Washington. She never was promoted above the rank of Associate Professor or received tenure. She died in 1983.

In 1984 a Festschrift in her honor was published by University of Washington Press, edited by Jay Miller and Carol M. Eastman.

Garfield's extensive papers are housed in University of Washington Special Collections.

== Works ==
- (1931) Change in the Marriage Customs of the Tsimshian. M.A. thesis, University of Washington, Seattle.
- (1939) "Tsimshian Clan and Society." University of Washington Publications in Anthropology, vol. 7, no. 3, pp. 167–340.
- (1947) "Historical Aspects of Tlingit Clans in Angoon, Alaska." American Anthropologist, vol. 49, no. 3, pp. 438–452.
- (1948) (with Linn Forest) The Wolf and the Raven: Totem Poles of Southeastern Alaska. Seattle: University of Washington Press.
- (1951; reissued, 1966) (with Paul S. Wingert) The Tsimshian and Their Arts. Seattle: University of Washington Press.
- (1951) Meet the Totem. Sitka, Alaska: Sitka Printing Company.
- (1953) "Possibilities of Genetic Relationship in Northern Pacific Moiety Structures." American Antiquity, vol. 18, no. 3, pp. 58–61.
- (1955) "Making a Bird or Chief's Rattle." Davidson Journal of Anthropology, vol. 1, no. 11, pp. 155–168.
- (1967) "Tsimshian." In Encyclopædia Britannica. Chicago: University of Chicago.

== Sources ==
- Miller, Jay (1988) "Viola Edmundson Garfield (1899-1983)." In Women Anthropologists: A Biographical Dictionary, ed. by Uta Gacs, Aisha Khan, Jerrie McIntyre, and Ruth Weinberg, pp. 109–114. New York: Greenwood Press.
- Miller, Jay, and Carol M. Eastman (eds.) (1984) The Tsimshian and Their Neighbors of the North Pacific Coast. Seattle: University of Washington Press.
