= Ki-Ke-In =

Nuu-chah-nulth cultural figure

- Born: February 11, 1948 (age 78); British Columbia, Canada
- Other names: Chuuchkamalthnii; Haa'yuups; Ron Hamilton
- Known for: Multimedia

Ki-Ke-In, also known as Chuuchkamalthnii, Haa'yuups, and Ron Hamilton is a Nuu-chah-nulth cultural figure from the Hupacasath First Nation. His work includes sculpture, drawings, paintings, dance, song, writing, regalia and curatorial activities which document the ceremonial life of his people. A resident of Port Alberni, Ki-ke-in's exhibition of his own and historical Nuu-chah-nulth ceremonial curtains at the University of British Columbia formed part of the 2010 Vancouver Cultural Olympiad. A fisherman by trade, the resources he works with are Campbell River slate, wood, silver, gold, and ivory, often modelling his work on the sea serpent.

In 2006, he worked for a month with the National Museum of the American Indian, "writing artifact descriptions and a chapter in the accompanying exhibit book" and singing "an ancient ciquaa (prayer chant)" and "speaking to the artifacts in his language and assuring them they are safe and in a good place." In 2018, he was named co-curator of a "multi-year project to restore and conserve a section that highlights First Nations cultures of the Pacific Northwest" at the American Museum of Natural History.
