= Old Massett Village Council =

Haida band government in British Columbia, Canada

- Band No. 669
- Haida: G̱aw X̱aadée Council Née
- Logo used by Old Massett Village Council

- Traditional territory of the Haida people
- People: Haida
- Headquarters: Old Massett
- Province: British Columbia

Land
- Main reserve: Masset 1
- Reserves: List: Ain 6; Cohoe Point 20; Daningay 12; Egeria Bay 19; Guoyskun 22; Hiellen 2; Jalun 14; Kioosta 15; Kose 9; Kung 11; Lanas 4; Mammin River 25; Meagwan 8; Naden 10; Owun 24; Saouchten 18; Susk 17; Tatense 16; Tiahn 27; Tlaa Gaa Aawtlaas 28; Yagan 3; Yan 7; Yasitkun 21; Yatze 13
- Land area: 9.7 km^{2} (3.7 sq mi)

Population (2026)
- On reserve: 705
- On other land: 65
- Off reserve: 2587
- Total population: 3357

Government
- Chief: Donald Edgars
- Council: 2023–26: Lisa Bell; Cecil Brown; Robert Brown; Benjamin Edgars; Ashley Jacobson; Brodie Swanson; Lisa White

Tribal Council
- Council of the Haida Nation

Website
- oldmassettvillagecouncil.com

Old Massett Village Council (OMVC; Haida: G̱aw X̱aadée Council Née) is a band government of the Haida people, located in Old Massett, on Haida Gwaii. Old Massett Village Council is one of two Canadian band governments for the Haida Nation, the other being Skidegate Band Council. The main governing body of the Haida people is the Council of the Haida Nation, and as such the two band councils function as village governments.

The band was formed in the late 19th century through the consolidation of Haida communities who spoke X̱aad Kíl, the northern dialect of the Haida language.

As of September 2026, the band has 3,357 registered members, 705 of whom live on reserve. It has 27 reserves, with a total area of 9.7 square kilometres (2,400 acres). The band is governed by an elected band council, consisting of one Chief and seven councillors, with elections held every three years.

== History ==
The Haida people are an Indigenous peoples of the Pacific Northwest whose traditional territory encompasses Haida Gwaii, an archipelago of islands off the northwest coast of the Canadian province of British Columbia, and parts of southeastern Alaska. Haida of Old Massett are from communities which spoke X̱aad Kíl, the northern dialect of the Haida language. The northern Haida inhabited the northern half of Graham Island, including other smaller islands like Langara and Hippa Islands. Their major villages included Kung (Haida: Ḵang), Hiellen (Haida: Hl'yaalan 'Llngée), Dadens (Haida: Daadans), Kiusta (Haida: K’yuusda), and Yan (Haida: Yáan 'Llngée).

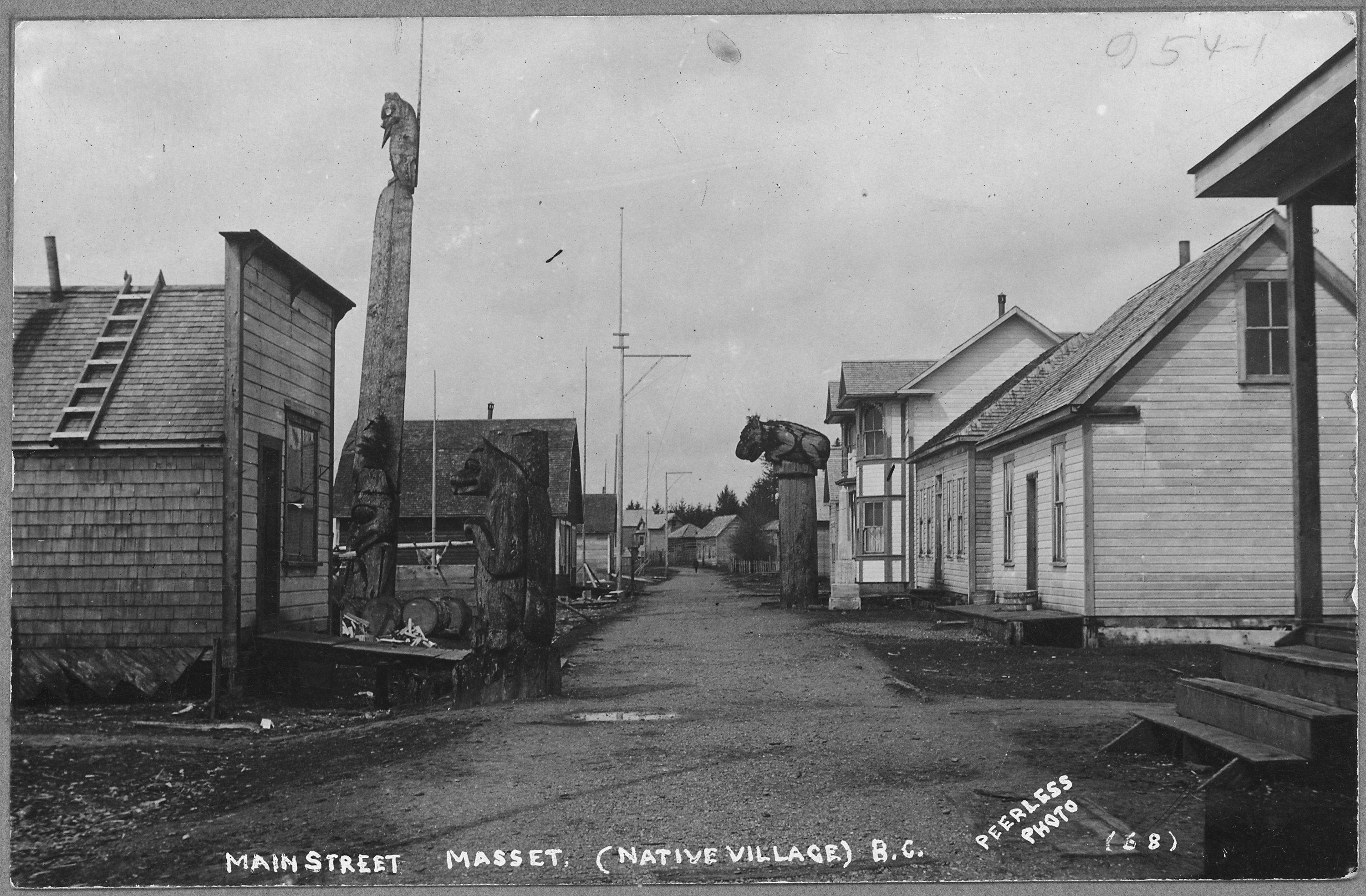
Old Massett in the early 20th century

Old Massett was created in the mid 19th century by the consolidation of many northern Haida villages in the wake of the smallpox epidemic of 1862. It was first the location of a Hudson's Bay Company post in 1850. In 1876, it became an Anglican mission, led by Rev. William H. Collison of the Church Missionary Society. That same year, the Haida were defined as Indians under the newly introduced Indian Act. In 1882, the Massett Band was allotted sixteen reserves, which amounted to 752.4 hectares (1,859 acres), by reserve commissioner Peter O'Reilly.

In 1886, Massett was part of the North West Coast Indian Agency, which was headquartered in Metlakatla. In 1910, the North West Coast Agency was subdivided, and Massett and Skidegate became part of the Queen Charlotte Indian Agency. This new agency introduced a full-time Indian agent who lived in Old Massett, subjecting the Haida to close government supervision for the first time. The band was governed by the Indian agent, with the support of the band council. The band council was formed in 1910, and consisted of seven elected community members, most of whom were graduates of the former Anglican Industrial school in Metlakatla.

In 1913, band members provided testimony to the McKenna–McBride Commission, rejecting the imposition of reserves and demanding allotments that were equal to those given to other First Nations in the province. The Commission resulted in the allotment of five additional reserves.

In 1966, the Queen Charlotte Agency was combined with the Naas Agency, which was based in Prince Rupert, ending the close oversight by an Indian Agent which had been in place since 1910. Eight years later, in 1974, the Council of the Haida Nation was formed to collectively represent Canadian Haida, with the specific mandate of settling land claims on Haida Gwaii. The band councils would maintain governing powers over social and economic development, education, and healthcare. The economic development included the establishment of the Yakoun River Hatchery in partnership with the Department of Fisheries and Oceans Canada in 1978, which sought to rebuild the salmon population of the Yakoun River.

== Demographics ==
Like other First Nation band governments, OMVC's registered population includes only status Indians as defined in the Indian Act, who are registered with the band. It therefore does not include individuals who are descended from the band, but have lost their status or are registered with a different band.

As of September 2026, Old Massett Village Council had 3,357 registered members. 705 members lived on reserve and 2,652 lived off reserve. The number of band members has been increasing from the historic low of 350 members in 1915.

Though the total band membership has been increasing, the population on the two inhabited reserves, Masset 1 and Tlaa Gaa Aawtlaas 28, has been decreasing, with a 19.6% decrease between 2006 and 2016.

Canada census – Masset 1 community profile

	2021	2016	2011
Population	475 (-14.4% from 2016)	555 (-9.6% from 2011)	614 (-11.5% from 2006)
Land area	3.16 km^{2} (1.22 sq mi)	3.21 km^{2} (1.24 sq mi)	3.21 km^{2} (1.24 sq mi)
Population density	150.4/km^{2} (390/sq mi)	173.1/km^{2} (448/sq mi)	191.5/km^{2} (496/sq mi)
Median age	44.8 (M: 47.2, F: 40.4)	42.4 (M: 43.2, F: 41.5)	40.4 (M: 41.2, F: 47.7)
Private dwellings	241 (total) 195 (occupied)	273 (total) 220 (occupied)	248 (total) 241 (occupied)
Median household income	$51,200	$30,208

Notes: Includes all residents on reserve, including non-status Indians
References: 2021 2016 2011

== Governance ==
The band council comprises eight members, with one chief councillor and seven council members. Elections are held every three years. The 2023–2026 council is:

- Donald Edgars (Chief Councillor)
- Lisa Bell
- Cecil Brown
- Robert Brown
- Benjamin Edgars
- Ashley Jacobson
- Brodie Swanson
- Lisa White

The primary governing body for the Haida people in Canada is the Council of the Haida Nation (CHN). Old Massett Village Council, alongside Skidegate Band Council, functions as a village government, while the CHN functions as a national government. OMVC is therefore responsible for membership, social development, education and healthcare.

== Economic Development ==
In 2014, Old Massett Village Council completed construction of the Hiellen Longhouse Village, a series of 7 cabins located on Hiellen Indian Reserve No. 2, in Naikoon Provincial Park.

== Education ==
Old Massett Village Council is responsible for the administration of Chief Matthews School (Haida: Chief Matthews Sk’adáa Née), a K-4 elementary school, which provides instruction in Haida. The school was first opened in 1994, and is named after longtime Chief Councillor and advocate for education Chief William Matthews.

In 2018, the band council established X̱aad Kíl Née (the Haida Language Office), to provide instruction and resources for learning X̱aad Kíl, the northern dialect of the Haida language.

== Geography ==
Old Massett Village Council has 27 reserves, whose combined total area is 9.7 square kilometres (2,400 acres), with the main reserve being Masset 1. The majority of the reserves are located on Graham Island (Haida: X̲aaydaɢ̲a Gwaay.yaay Iinaɢ̲waay), with 4 located on the nearby Langara Island (Haida: K’iis Gwaay). Reserves numbered 1-16 were part of the initial allotment by reserve commissioner Peter O'Reilly in 1882. Numbers 17-21 were allotted by Royal Commission in 1916.

The band is classified as a Zone 4, Sub-zone 1 geographic zone by CIRNAC, meaning that there is no year-round road access, leading to a higher coast of transportation, and that they are between 50 km and 160 km from the nearest service centre (Prince Rupert).

List of reserves
Reserve	Haida name	Location	Area	Coordinates	Ref.
Massett 1	Haida: G̱aw Tlagée	East shore of Masset Inlet below its entry point, north coast of Graham Island.	299.5 ha (740 acres)	54°02′00″N 132°10′00″W	
Hiellen 2	Haida: Hl'yaalan 'Llngée, lit. 'flat-slope town'	At mouth of Hiellen River, south of Taaw Tldáaw, northeast coast of Graham Island. Location of Hiellen.	27.4 ha (68 acres)	54°04′22″N 131°47′16″W	
Yagan 3	Haida: Yaagun Kún ‘Llngée	At Yakan Point, west of Taaw Tldáaw, on McIntyre Bay, north coast of Graham Island.	34.8 ha (86 acres)	54°04′01″N 131°49′19″W	
Lanas 4		At the mouth of the Yakoun River, Yakoun Bay, southeast shore of Masset Inlet, central Graham Island.	78 ha (190 acres)	53°39′11″N 132°13′03″W	
Satunquin 5	Haida: Saahldangkun	At Strathdang Kwun, point on west side of Yakoun Bay of Masset Inlet, Graham Island.	3.6 ha (8.9 acres)	53°40′11″N 132°13′25″W	
Ain 6	Haida: Áayan 'Llngée	At mouth of the Ain River, north shore of Masset Inlet, Graham Island.	66.4 ha (164 acres)	53°44′40″N 132°25′21″W	
Yan 7	Haida: Yaagun Kún ‘Llngée, lit. 'directly opposite a ledge'	West side of entrance to Masset Inlet, Graham Island.	106.8 ha (264 acres)	54°03′49″N 132°14′34″W	
Meagwan 8		At Wiah Point, north coast of Graham Island.	19.8 ha (49 acres)	54°06′35″N 132°18′43″W	
Kose 9		Left bank of the Naden River, four miles south of the mouth of Naden Harbour, Graham Island.	3.6 ha (8.9 acres)	53°54′23″N 132°42′41″W	
Naden 10		At mouth of Standly Creek, Naden Harbour, Graham Island.	2.6 ha (6.4 acres)	53°56′50″N 132°40′49″W	
Kung 11	Haida: Ḵang, lit. 'dream town'	West side of Alexandra Narrows, which connects Naden Harbour and Virago Sound. Location of Ḵang.	28.7 ha (71 acres)	54°03′02″N 132°34′34″W	
Daningay 12		West side of Virago Sound, north coast of Graham Island.	8.5 hectares (21 acres)	54°05′04″N 132°34′47″W	
Yatze 13	Haida: Yaats', lit. 'Knife Village'	Southeast of Klashwun Point, west of Virago Sound, north coast of Graham Island.	18.2 ha (45 acres)	54°08′41″N 132°39′46″W	
Jalun 14		Northwest of Nankivell Point, mouth of Jalun River, northwest coast of Graham Island.	7.1 ha (18 acres)	54°07′43″N 132°47′59″W	
Kioosta 15	Haida: Yaagun Kún ‘Llngée, lit. 'where the tail comes out'	South shore of Parry Passage, northwest tip of Graham Island. Site of Kiusta.	40.9 ha (101 acres)	54°10′44″N 133°01′45″W	
Tatense 16	Haida: Daadans	Southwest tip of Langara Island. Location of Dadens.	6.5 ha (16 acres)	54°11′19″N 132°59′02″W	
Susk 17		At Peril Bay east of Frederick Island, west coast of Graham Island.	63.1 ha (156 acres)	53°55′58″N 133°07′07″W	
Saouchten 18		Rooney Point, west side of Masset Harbour, Graham Island.	11.4 ha (28 acres)	54°00′53″N 132°11′02″W	
Egeria Bay 19	Haida: Ts'aahl	On Egeria Bay, east side of Langara Island.	10.1 ha (25 acres)	54°13′06″N 132°59′22″W	
Cohoe Point 20	Haida: Yaa Stl'ang, lit. 'town straight back [in the inlet]'	On Dibrell Bay, east coast of Langara Island.	8.5 ha (21 acres)	54°13′53″N 132°58′35″W	
Yasitkun 21		Northwest coast of Langara Island.	20.2 ha (50 acres)	54°15′02″N 133°03′27″W	
Guoyskun 22		At Rhodeas Point, west coast of Langara Island.	20.2 ha (50 acres)	54°13′11″N 133°01′56″W	
Naden 23	Haida: K'uu'laanas	At mouth of Standly Creek, Naden Harbour, north shore of Graham Island. Location of K'uu'laanas.	2.6 ha (6.4 acres)	53°58′25″N 132°41′24″W	
Owun 24		At the mouth of the Awun River, Awun Bay, south shore of Massett Inlet, Graham Island.	3 ha (7.4 acres)	53°39′14″N 132°31′23″W	
Mammin River 25	Haida: Maaman 'Llngée	At mouth of the Mamin River on Mammin Bay, Masset Inlet, Graham Island.	2.5 ha (6.2 acres)	53°37′25″N 132°18′21″W	
Tiahn 27	Haida: Tii.aan	At Tian Bay, west shore of Graham Island.	2.3 ha (5.7 acres)	53°46′23″N 133°04′49″W	
Tlaa Gaa Aawtlaas 28	Haida: Tlaga G̱áwtlaas, lit. 'New Town'	Just south of Massett on east side of Masset Sound between Camp and Skaga Points, Graham Island.	63.7 ha (157 acres)	53°59′40″N 132°08′05″W	

== See also ==
- Haida people
- Haida language
- Skidegate Band Council
- Council of the Haida Nation
