= Kung (Haida village) =

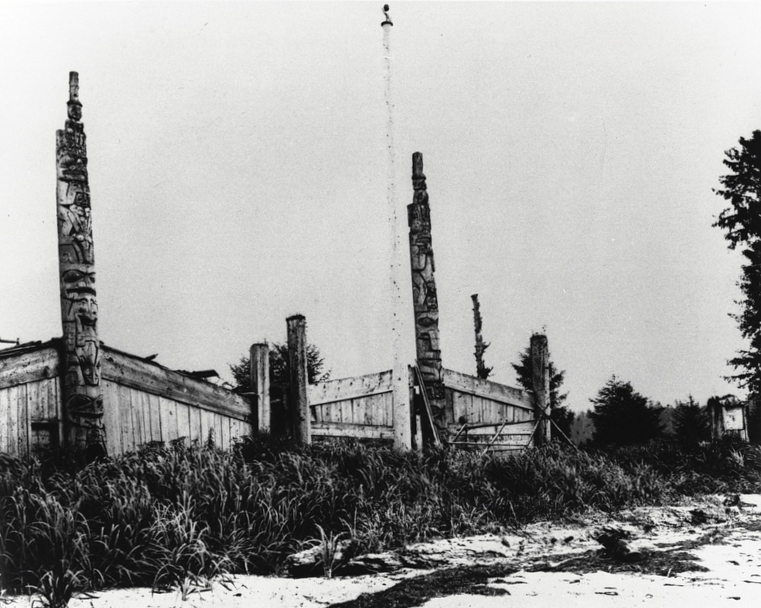
- Houses at Kung in 1878

- Location within British Columbia
- 54°2′58″N 132°34′6″W
- Type: Historic village site
- Location: Haida Gwaii

Site notes
- Governing body: Council of the Haida Nation

Ḵung (Haida: Ḵang, lit. 'Dream Town') is a Haida village, located on the west side of Alexandra Narrows on Graham Island, the largest and northernmost island of Haida Gwaii (X̱aayda gwaayaay) alongside British Columbia, Canada. Alexandra Narrows, known on some old maps as Mazzaredo Sound, connects Naden Harbour and Virago Sound. An earlier village located at the current village site was named ‘Nightasis’ by the fur trader John Work, and records that in 1840 there were 15 houses with 280 residents.

== Clans ==
The Ḵung village was populated by four main clans: the Staastas Eagles, Those Who Left The West Coast, the Up-inlet Town People and a single Saganusili Raven clan. The east of the village was home to the Up-inlet Town People, who were the original occupants, and Those Who Left The West Coast. The Staastas Eagle clan were the residents of the west side of Ḵung, with the exception of one Rose Spit Raven family known as Saganusili. Guulas was village chief and member of the Up-inlet Town People clan.

== Houses from west to east ==
In 1899, John Swanton interviewed a number of elderly people living in Massett about the village of Ḵung. He recorded information on the last stage of occupation:

- House 1: No recorded names.
- House 2: Belonged to Chief Qaskiath of the Staatas Eagles; named Hi'ilang Naas (Thunder House).
- House 3: Belonged to 7idansuu (Chief Albert Edward Edenshaw) of the Staatas Eagles; named Sk'ulxa Haay'ad (House That Can Hold A Great Crowd of People). Has features that are found in Kaigani Haida homes located in Alaska. 7idansuu also erected a pole at Ḵung in the early 1860s that depicts Governor James Douglas.
- House 4: Belonged to Wā'lans "Anything roasted on a stick" of the Saganusili of the Ravens; named Na Ḵehulas (House They Always Like to Go Into).
- House 5: Belonged to łq!a’ndé of the Staastas Eagles; named Stiil Naas (Steel House).
- House 6: Belonged to Xalas of the Staastas Eagles; named Na Giidii (House Child).
- House 7: Belonged to Tiiyasaangaay "The one they said would kill" of the Up-inlet Town People; Gaa'taga T'eeuu (House That Has Light in It).
- House 8: Belonged to the Chief of Those Who Left the West Coast clan, Gustamalk; named Skaawgan Naas (Salmon-berry House).
- House 9: Belonged to Ḵ'aalanga (Painted) of Those Who Left the West Coast clan; named Sgaan Naas (Killer Whale House).
- House 10: Belonged to Kuudada (Kodada) of Those Who Left the West Coast clan; named Guujaaw Naas (Drum House).
- House 11: Belonged to Kun staa'ads (Chief Kunstaits) of the Up-inlet Town People; named Gya'aang Kyyjaa (Valuable House Pole).
- House 12: Belonged to Guulas (Chief Abalone) of the Up-inlet Town People; no name for the home was recorded.
- House 13: Belonged to Ḵajahl (Chief Qadjatl) of the Up-inlet Town People; no name for home was recorded.

== Migration ==
In 1853 residents from Kiusta village migrated to Ḵung. Chief Albert Edward Edenshaw (Haida: 7idansuu, lit. 'One that can hold Crowds') of Kiusta moved his people to Ḵung as part of the larger Haida migrations occurring in the late 1800s, related to massive population decimation resulting from disease. The Haida were hit with a series of smallpox epidemics resulting in population decline from 20,000 prior to 1770 to less than 600 by the late 1800s. The 1862 Pacific Northwest smallpox epidemic alone killed over 70% of the Haida people. The surveyor and geologist, George Mercer Dawson visited the village in 1878 and describes 8 to 10 decaying homes some of which were still inhabited, facing long the bank towards the water. After Dawson’s visit to the village, residents moved from Ḵung to the larger area of G̲aaw (Old Massett). Provincial government surveyor Newton Chittenden visited Ḵung in 1884 and it had been left as a permanent village, but the site continued to be utilized as a halibut fishing camp with more temporary structures built.

Anthropologist George A. Dorsey collected ancestral remains from many Haida grave sites in Ḵung, which were stored at the Field Museum of Natural History in Chicago. Dorsey recorded details about the grave sites of former chiefs and spiritual healers (shamans) in his journal, while pillaging the grave sites for human remains. The Haida Repatriation Committee with the Haida Heritage Centre at Ḵay 'Llnagaay have been actively working on repatriating the ancestral remains of over 500 Haidas from provincial, federal and international museums back to Haida Gwaii for traditional burial.

There were proposals put forward by the Haida Heritage and Repatriation Society in 2010, to take canoes to the village sites of Yan, Ḵung and Kiusta to hold ceremonies to honour the Haida people that died from smallpox epidemics. Similar ceremonies have been done at sites like Bones Bay, to honour the kuuniisii (ancestors) that died during disease epidemics.

== Reserve ==
Kung Indian Reserve No. 11, or Kung 11 in official registries, is located at the site of Ḵung. The Kung Indian Reserve is under the administration of the Haida Nation (Old Massett Village Council) and is 28.7 ha in size.

== See also ==
- List of Indian Reserves in Canada
- List of Haida villages
