= Hecate Strait =

Strait between Haida Gwaii and mainland British Columbia

- French: Détroit d'Hécate
- K̲andaliig̲wii (Haida)
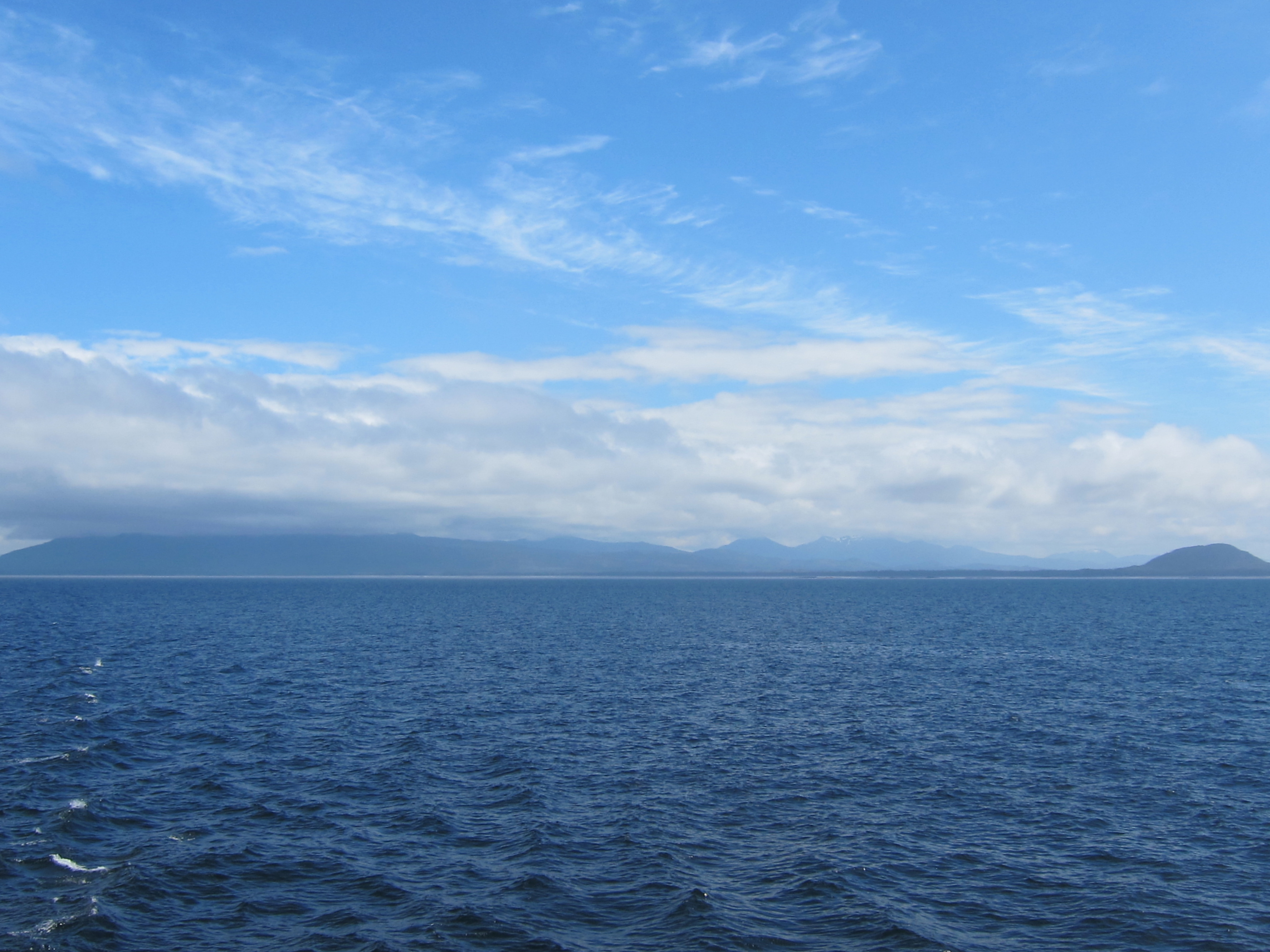
- Hecate Strait and Pitt Island

- Location within British Columbia

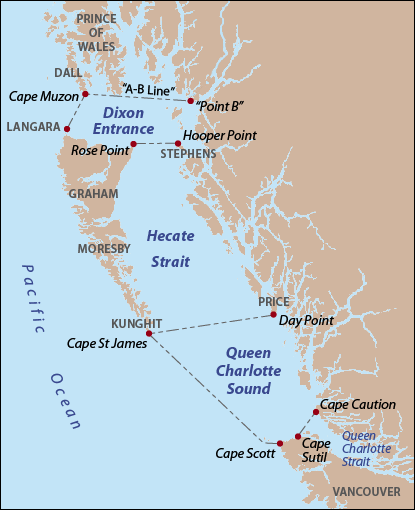
- Hecate Strait as delineated by BCGNIS, along with Queen Charlotte Sound and Dixon Entrance. Red dots indicate capes and points, gray text indicates island names.
- Location: British Columbia, Canada
- Coordinates: 53°11′N 130°50′W
- Ocean/sea sources: Pacific Ocean
- Max. length: 260 km (160 mi)
- Max. width: 140 km (87 mi)
- Settlements: Daajing Giids, Skidegate, Sandspit, Tlell, Kitkatla

Hecate Strait (/ˈhɛkɪt/; Haida language: K̲andaliig̲wii, also siigaay which means simply "ocean") is a wide but shallow strait between Haida Gwaii and the mainland of British Columbia, Canada. It merges with Queen Charlotte Sound to the south and Dixon Entrance to the north. About 140 kilometres (87 mi) wide at its southern end, Hecate Strait narrows in the north to about 48 kilometres (30 mi). It is about 260 kilometres (160 mi) in length.

== Definition ==
According to the BCGNIS, the southern boundary of Hecate Strait is defined as a line running from the southernmost point of Price Island to Cape St James on Kunghit Island, the southernmost point of Haida Gwaii. The northern boundary is a line from Rose Point, the northeastern tip of Graham Island, to Hooper Point at the north end of Stephens Island off the mainland.

== History ==
The Haida of Haida Gwaii crossed the Hecate Strait to the mainland to plunder coastal villages to take slaves and booty. Sometimes mainland First Nations crossed Hecate Strait to Haida Gwaii, such as a Nisga'a war party from the lower Nass River, which crossed the strait in a retaliatory raid after an attack by Haida Ravens from Hiellen, which took Nisga'a slaves back to Hiellen. The inhabitants of Hiellen, fearing a Nisga'a retaliation, took refuge in Masset. The Nisga'a found Hiellen abandoned and burned it to the ground. Haida from Masset counterattacked, resulting in a long battle at Hiellen and nearby Taaw Tldáaw. The Nisga'a survivors crossed Hecate Strait again to return home.

The Strait was first explored for the Europeans in 1792 by the Spanish Armada explorer Jacinto Caamaño. Hecate Strait was named by Captain George Henry Richards in 1861 or 1862 after his surveying vessel, HMS Hecate.

== Geology ==
During the last ice age, the seafloor in this area was a wide coastal plain stretching south to the Olympic Peninsula and including what is now Queen Charlotte Sound. The depth of the strait varies from 200 metres in the south to 25 metres east of Rose Spit.

== Flora and fauna ==
The strait once contained strong salmon and halibut fisheries.

Hecate Strait is one of the few locations in the world with species from the glass sponge class of fauna. Regions with these sponge are currently protected from damage by commercial fishing.

The Hecate Strait and Queen Charlotte Sound Glass Sponge Reefs Marine Protected Area was designated by the Fisheries and Oceans Canada in February 2017. The MPA is located in the Northern Shelf bioregion of the Pacific Region, southeast of Haida Gwaii, North and South of the entrance to the Douglas Channel. The MPA is composed of three individual areas known as the Northern Reef, the Central Reefs, and the Southern Reef. Together these three areas cover approximately 2,410 km^{2} (930 sq mi) The four reef complexes in the Hecate Strait and Queen Charlotte Sound discontinuously cover an area of about 1,000 km^{2} (390 sq mi), and are located in glacial troughs 140–240 m (460–790 ft) deep.

== Hazards and restrictions ==
Environment Canada comments that “it has been said that the Hecate Strait is the fourth most dangerous body of water in the world”. It is noted for strong winds, seasonal fog, powerful tidal currents, frequent southeast gales and shallow waters. During winter storms, swells commonly reach 8 to 10 metres in the southern part of the Strait. The northern Strait is more protected, experiencing swells near 8 metres only once or twice a winter. Shallow water depths over large sections of Hecate Strait allow short steep periods waves to develop quickly. This makes transiting across the Strait quite dangerous for smaller vessels.

A local author goes further, commenting that swells can reach 10 to 20 meters and expose the sea floor.

There is a moratorium on large oil tankers in a large zone that includes the Hecate Strait.
