= Hiellen River =

Coordinates: 54°04′00″N 131°47′00″W

The Hiellen River (Haida: Hl'yáalan G̱andlee) is a river on Graham Island in the Haida Gwaii of British Columbia, Canada. It flows north into McIntyre Bay to the east of Taaw Tldáaw, and is entirely within Naikoon Provincial Park, which covers most of the peninsula of the same name. At the mouth of the Hiellen River is Hiellen Indian Reserve No. 2, which is on the site of Hiellen, a once-large Haida village whose remaining families located to Masset during the 19th Century.

== See also ==
- List of rivers of British Columbia
