= Hiellen =

Hiellen Hl'yaalang Tlielang, Hliiyalang, Łi'elᴀñ
- Historic Haida village
- Location of Hiellen in British Columbia
- Coordinates: 54°3′59″N 131°47′6″W
- Country: Canada
- Province: British Columbia
- Haida Nation: Haida Gwaii

Hiellen, anglicized from the Haida name Hl'yaalang, and also spelled in various ways such as Hliiyalang (Bringhurst) and Łi'elᴀñ (Swanton), was a historic Haida village located on the northern shore of Graham Island, at the mouth of the Hiellen River, across the river from Taaw Tldáaw (formerly "Tow Hill"), in Haida Gwaii, British Columbia, Canada.

The site of Hiellen is in the Indian Reserve known as Hiellen 2, about 3 km (1.9 mi) east of "Yagan 3". Hiellen is located about 25 km (16 mi) east of Masset, about 90 km (56 mi) north of Skidegate, and about 100 km (62 mi) west of Prince Rupert, on the mainland across Hecate Strait.

== History ==
Hiellen was a very old village, occupied for a long period in prehistoric times. Two different branches of the Eagle moeity trace their origin back to Hiellen. In the early 19th century the most important Eagle chief at Hiellen, who occupied the largest house, was known as Sqilao. However the town's head chief was a Raven known as Giatlins. Sqilao, was a close relative of the first known Chief Edenshaw, who was the uncle of Albert Edward Edenshaw, who in turn was the uncle of Charles Edenshaw.

The location of Hiellen conferred various benefits which contributed to the town's size and importance. The Hiellen River supports rich salmon runs, while the extensive tide flats around the river's mouth provided an abundance of razor clams and other shellfish.

Nearby Taaw Tldáaw (formerly Tow Hill), a steep-sided remnant volcanic plug, was not only an important landmark for canoes crossing Dixon Entrance, but also served Hiellen defensively. According to Tsimshian war narratives collected by Marius Barbeau, there was an elaborate fort built on the hill, with pallisades set at overhanging angles and entry limited to a trap door. According to oral history collected by John R. Swanton, around 1860 a war party of Haida Ravens from Hiellen attacked the Nisga'a near their village of Anguidah on the Nass River. The raid was a success and the Haida brought slaves back to Hiellen. However, the people of Hiellen feared a retaliatory raid and took refuge in Masset. When the Nisga'a did mount an attack on Hiellen they found it deserted, and they burned the town to the ground. The smoke from the fire was visible to the people of Hiellen in Masset, and a counterattack was organized. The Haida and Nisga'a fought each other at Hiellen. The battle lasted all day and resulted in many casualties on both sides. After this, Hiellen was abandoned. The Raven families moved to Masset permanently, while most of the Eagle families relocated to Kiusta.

During the 19th century the Haida people suffered major depopulation due to multiple epidemics of many diseases, with the most catastrophic being the 1862 Pacific Northwest smallpox epidemic, which resulted in the abandonment of all Haida villages on Haida Gwaii except Masset and Skidegate.

In the 1920s a clam cannery operated at or near the site of Hiellen, causing a small community to spring up at the old town site. The remains of the old town were destroyed during this period. The cannery closed in the 1930s. In 1981 the National Museums of Canada conducted an archaeological survey, which was able to locate the sites of five houses, though there were probably more in proto- and prehistoric times. According to Swanton, the largest house was named "House For a Large Crowd of People".

== See also ==
- List of Haida villages
- Maritime fur trade
