= Tlell =

Community in British Columbia, Canada

Hamlet of Tlell
- Hamlet
- Location of Tlell in British Columbia
- Coordinates: 53°34′50″N 131°56′27″W
- Country: Canada
- Province: British Columbia
- Region: Haida Gwaii
- Regional district: Skeena-Queen Charlotte
- Founded: 1904

Government
  - Governing body: Skeena-Queen Charlotte board

Area
  - Total: 101.28 km^{2} (39.10 sq mi)
  - Land: 101.02 km^{2} (39.00 sq mi)
  - Water: 0.26 km^{2} (0.10 sq mi)
- Elevation: 5 m (16 ft)

Population (2016)
  - Total: 183
  - Density: 1.8/km^{2} (4.7/sq mi)
- Time zone: UTC-8 (PST)
- Postal code span: V0T 1Y0
- Highways: Highway 16 (TCH)
- Waterways: Hecate Strait

Tlell is a small, unincorporated area on the east coast of Graham Island, which is part of Haida Gwaii (formerly the Queen Charlotte Islands) in British Columbia, Canada.

== History ==
Besides Mexican Tom, who set up camp at Tlell in 1904, Eric Richardson was one of – if not the first – to make this camp a permanent settlement, by establishing the Richardson Ranch, which is still active and on the spot.

Tlell was connected to Port Clements and Skidegate (43 km) via a paved Highway 16 in 1969.

The village frames the southern end of Naikoon Provincial Park, known for the nearby Pesuta Shipwreck, and its long stretches of sandy beach. Other tourist attractions include the Tlell River and Mayer Lake, with the Tlell river hosting many salmon in fall. Services offered include some bed and breakfasts, a general store, several arts and crafts galleries, the Naikoon Park headquarters and a camp site.

== Demographics ==
Some 607 people reside in the greater periphery, additionally encompassing other small communities like Taaw Tldáaw, Lawn Hill and Miller Creek.

== Culture ==
Once every August, the Edge of the World Music Festival takes place in Tlell, as well as the Tlell Fall Fair in August; both attract many visitors from off the islands.

Apart from this, there is little municipal infrastructure and no such thing as a town center or a harbour. Tlell is rather a scattered cluster of separate homes, many of them occupied by artisans living alternative lifestyles.

== Climate ==
The climate is generally mild with no extremes in temperature, oceanic (Cfb), very similar to the west coast of Scotland.

Climate data for Tlell
Month	Jan	Feb	Mar	Apr	May	Jun	Jul	Aug	Sep	Oct	Nov	Dec	Year
Record high °C (°F)	12.8 (55.0)	12.0 (53.6)	19.4 (66.9)	20.6 (69.1)	25.0 (77.0)	30.6 (87.1)	32.2 (90.0)	28.5 (83.3)	25.0 (77.0)	19.4 (66.9)	14.0 (57.2)	12.2 (54.0)	32.2 (90.0)
Mean daily maximum °C (°F)	5.3 (41.5)	5.8 (42.4)	7.6 (45.7)	9.8 (49.6)	12.9 (55.2)	15.3 (59.5)	17.7 (63.9)	18.4 (65.1)	16.0 (60.8)	11.5 (52.7)	7.2 (45.0)	5.3 (41.5)	11.1 (52.0)
Daily mean °C (°F)	3.1 (37.6)	3.4 (38.1)	4.6 (40.3)	6.4 (43.5)	9.4 (48.9)	11.8 (53.2)	14.2 (57.6)	14.7 (58.5)	12.5 (54.5)	8.6 (47.5)	4.7 (40.5)	3.1 (37.6)	8.0 (46.4)
Mean daily minimum °C (°F)	0.9 (33.6)	0.9 (33.6)	1.6 (34.9)	2.9 (37.2)	5.8 (42.4)	8.4 (47.1)	10.5 (50.9)	10.9 (51.6)	9.0 (48.2)	5.6 (42.1)	2.1 (35.8)	0.8 (33.4)	4.9 (40.8)
Record low °C (°F)	−15.0 (5.0)	−13.0 (8.6)	−8.9 (16.0)	−3.9 (25.0)	−2.2 (28.0)	1.1 (34.0)	4.4 (39.9)	3.3 (37.9)	1.1 (34.0)	−6.5 (20.3)	−14.5 (5.9)	−16.7 (1.9)	−16.7 (1.9)
Average precipitation mm (inches)	146.1 (5.75)	121.8 (4.80)	95.6 (3.76)	96.1 (3.78)	64.4 (2.54)	60.5 (2.38)	55.8 (2.20)	71.2 (2.80)	92.6 (3.65)	177.8 (7.00)	174.5 (6.87)	164.6 (6.48)	1,321.1 (52.01)
Average rainfall mm (inches)	137.0 (5.39)	110.0 (4.33)	92.8 (3.65)	95.2 (3.75)	64.4 (2.54)	60.5 (2.38)	55.8 (2.20)	71.2 (2.80)	92.6 (3.65)	177.5 (6.99)	170.0 (6.69)	156.4 (6.16)	1,283.5 (50.53)
Average snowfall cm (inches)	9.1 (3.6)	11.8 (4.6)	2.8 (1.1)	0.9 (0.4)	0.0 (0.0)	0.0 (0.0)	0.0 (0.0)	0.0 (0.0)	0.0 (0.0)	0.3 (0.1)	4.5 (1.8)	8.2 (3.2)	37.6 (14.8)
Average precipitation days (≥ 0.2 mm)	23.4	20.0	22.3	21.2	17.8	17.1	15.1	16.6	18.9	25.8	25.6	24.0	247.9
Average rainy days (≥ 0.2 mm)	22.2	18.8	21.9	21.2	17.8	17.1	15.1	16.6	18.9	25.8	25.2	22.9	243.5
Average snowy days (≥ 0.2 cm)	2.9	3.1	1.6	0.6	0.0	0.0	0.0	0.0	0.0	0.3	1.8	2.6	12.8

== See also ==
- List of Haida villages
