= Hiellen Indian Reserve No. 2 =

Hiellen 2
- First Nation Reserve
- Interactive map of Hiellen 2
- Coordinates: 54°04′00″N 131°47′00″W
- Country: Canada
- Province: British Columbia
- Regional district: North Coast
- Region: Haida Gwaii
- Allotted: 13 July 1888

Government
  - Type: Band government
  - Body: Old Massett Village Council

Area
  - Total: 27.4 ha (68 acres)

Hiellen 2, or Hiellen Indian Reserve No. 2, is one of 27 Indian reserves under the administration of Old Massett Village Council, a band government of the Haida people. It is located within Naikoon Provincial Park, at the mouth of the Hiellen River on the north coast of Graham Island in Haida Gwaii, and is the site of the historic Haida village of Hiellen. Its total area is 24.70 hectares (61.0 acres).

It was one of 16 reserves initially allotted to Old Massett in 1888 by reserve commissioner Peter O'Reilly. At the time of his initial survey in 1882, the village was mostly abandoned, and was primarily used for salmon fishing.

In 2014, Old Massett Village Council constructed the Hiellen Village Longhouses, a series of rentable longhouse-style cabins, constructed by community members. In 2017, a totem pole carved by Christian White was raised at the site.
