= Taaw Tldáaw =

Hill in British Columbia, Canada

- Tow Hill
- Taaw Tldáaw on Graham Island

Highest point
- Elevation: 125 m (410 ft)
- Prominence: 118 m (387 ft)
- Listing: List of volcanoes in Canada
- Coordinates: 54°04′27.1″N 131°47′56.1″W

Geography
- Location: Graham Island, British Columbia, Canada
- District: Queen Charlotte Land District
- Topo map: NTS 103J4 Tow Hill

Geology
- Rock age: 2 million years
- Mountain type: Volcanic plug

Taaw Tldáaw, formerly known as Tow Hill, is a large isolated volcanic plug located 21 km (13 mi) east of Masset on the north end of the Naikoon Peninsula of northeast Graham Island in Haida Gwaii, British Columbia, Canada, east of McIntyre Bay and near the mouth of the Hiellen River, which is the site of Hiellen, a now-abandoned Haida village and of the Hiellen Indian Reserve No. 2, on the site of that village. Formerly Tow Hill Provincial Park, it is now part of Naikoon Provincial Park, which covers most of the northeastern flatland of Graham Island.

Taaw Tldáaw is the traditional, ancient name of this hill. During the colonial era it was, as the Haida phrase it, "briefly known as Tow Hill". The name Taaw Tldáaw was officially restored in 2022 as part of the Haida's ongoing efforts to reclaim their indigenous land rights and sovereignty.

Taaw Tldáaw is associated by the editors of Canadian Mountain Encyclopedia with the Queen Charlotte Mountains which in turn form part of the Insular Mountains, but it is not physically part of the range, and is separated from mountainous parts of Graham Island by expanses of forested flatland-marsh and is properly designated as being on the Argonaut Plain, one of the lowland areas of Haida Gwaii not in the Queen Charlotte Mountains.

Taaw Tldáaw consists of faceted columnar-jointed basalt columns that solidified about two million years ago during the Pleistocene epoch.

"This feature is an eroded volcanic plug - the most distinctive navigational landmark on the entire North Beach. Tow is derived from a Haida word that rhymes with "cow", and means place of food. Many legends about its origin and the significance of the blowhole at the base of the hill......"

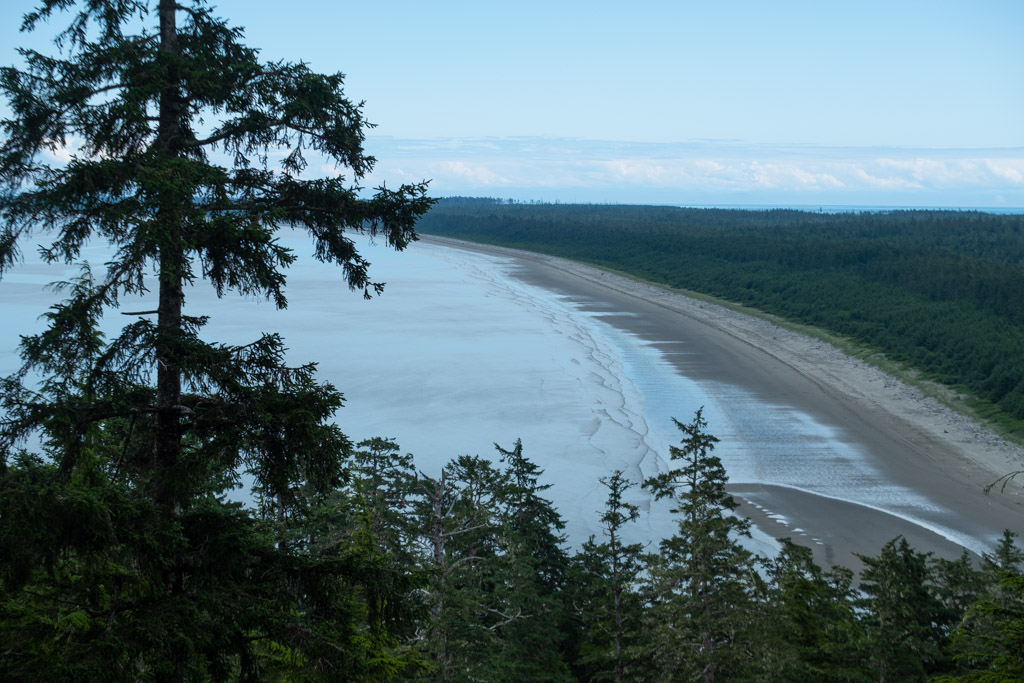
Looking Northeast from Taaw Tldáaw at North Beach

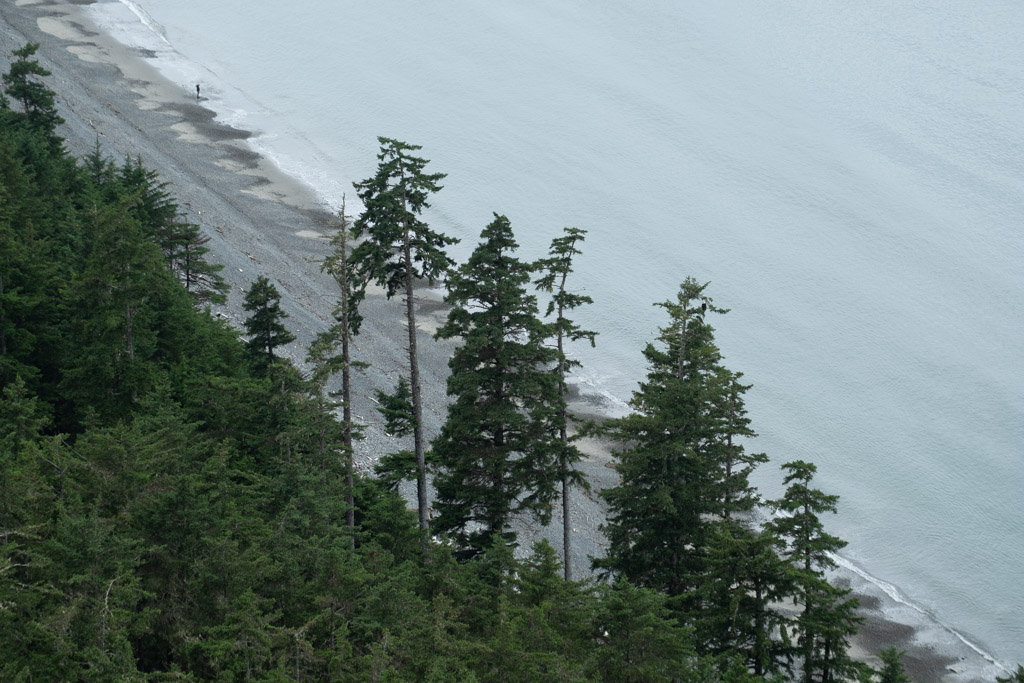
Looking down from Taaw Tldáaw

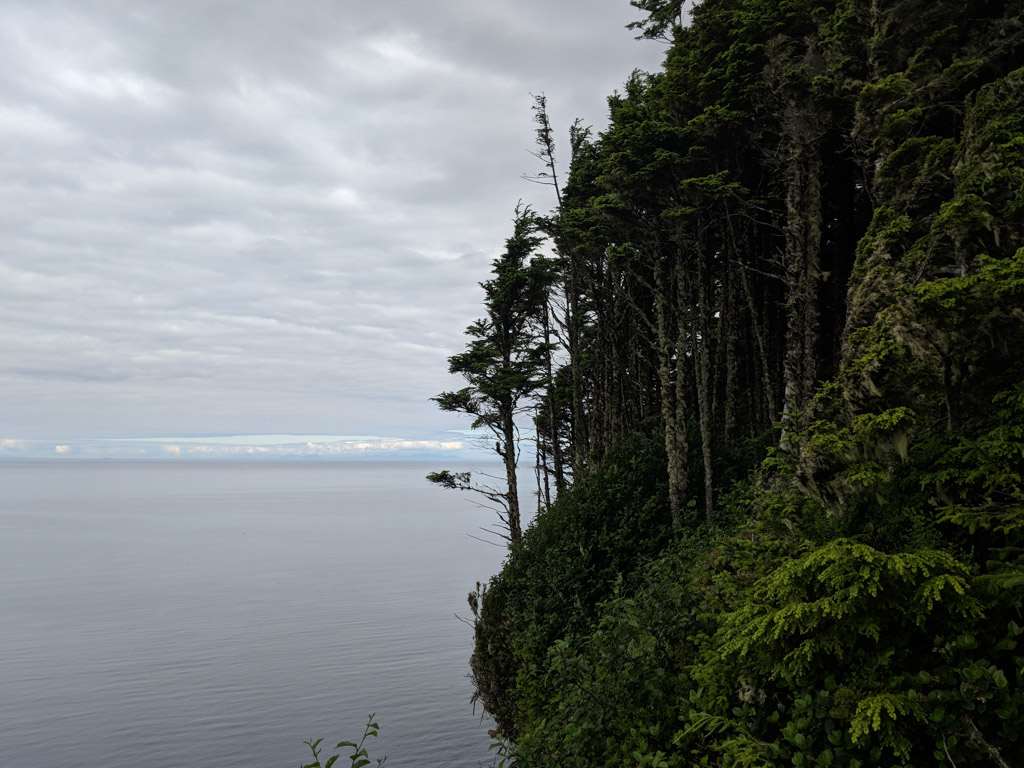
Looking North from Taaw Tldáaw; Alaska on the horizon

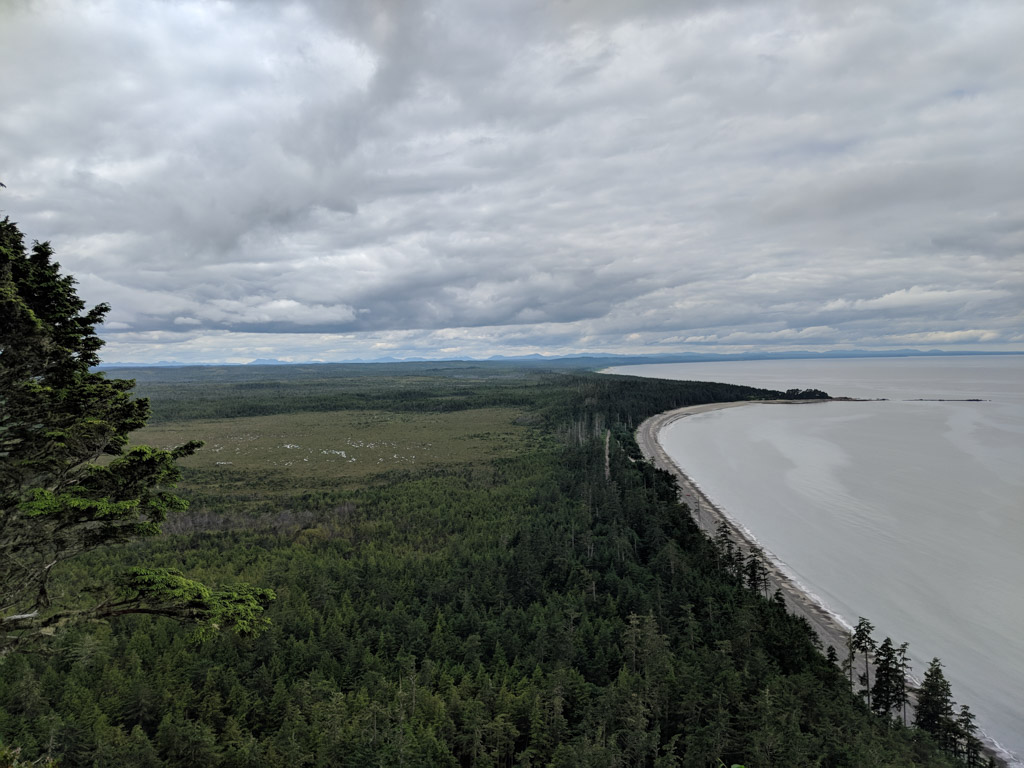
Looking South from Taaw Tldáaw

== See also ==
- Volcanism in Canada
- List of volcanoes in Canada
