= Smallpox Bay =

Coordinates: 48.5412092°N 123.1599073°W

Smallpox Bay is a bay on the west side of San Juan Island in the U.S. state of Washington.

Smallpox Bay was named for the fact that a group of indigenous victims of the 1862 Pacific Northwest smallpox epidemic died there and their corpses burned by US officers.
