= Ain River (Haida Gwaii) =

Coordinates: 53°43′57″N 132°25′24″W

The Ain River is a river on Graham Island in the Haida Gwaii archipelago of the North Coast region of British Columbia, Canada, flowing southeast into Masset Inlet.

== Name ==
The name was conferred by George Dawson of the Geophysical Survey of Canada in 1878, who derived it from the Haida name Qua'nun.

== See also ==
- List of rivers of British Columbia
