= Council of the Haida Nation =

Elected government of the Haida people

Council of the Haida Nation X̱aaydaG̱a Waadlux̱an Naay (Haida)
- 1974
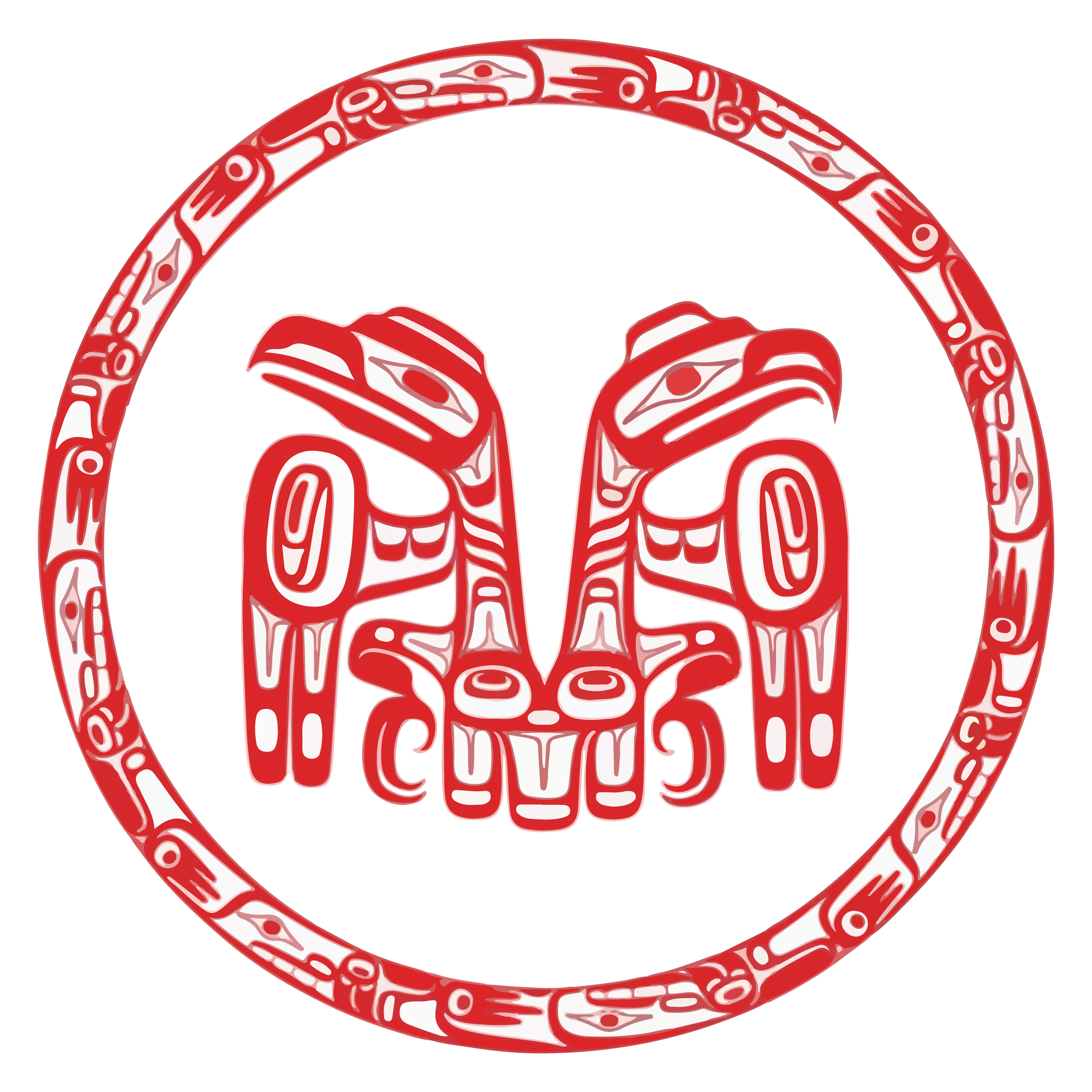
- Flag Coat of arms

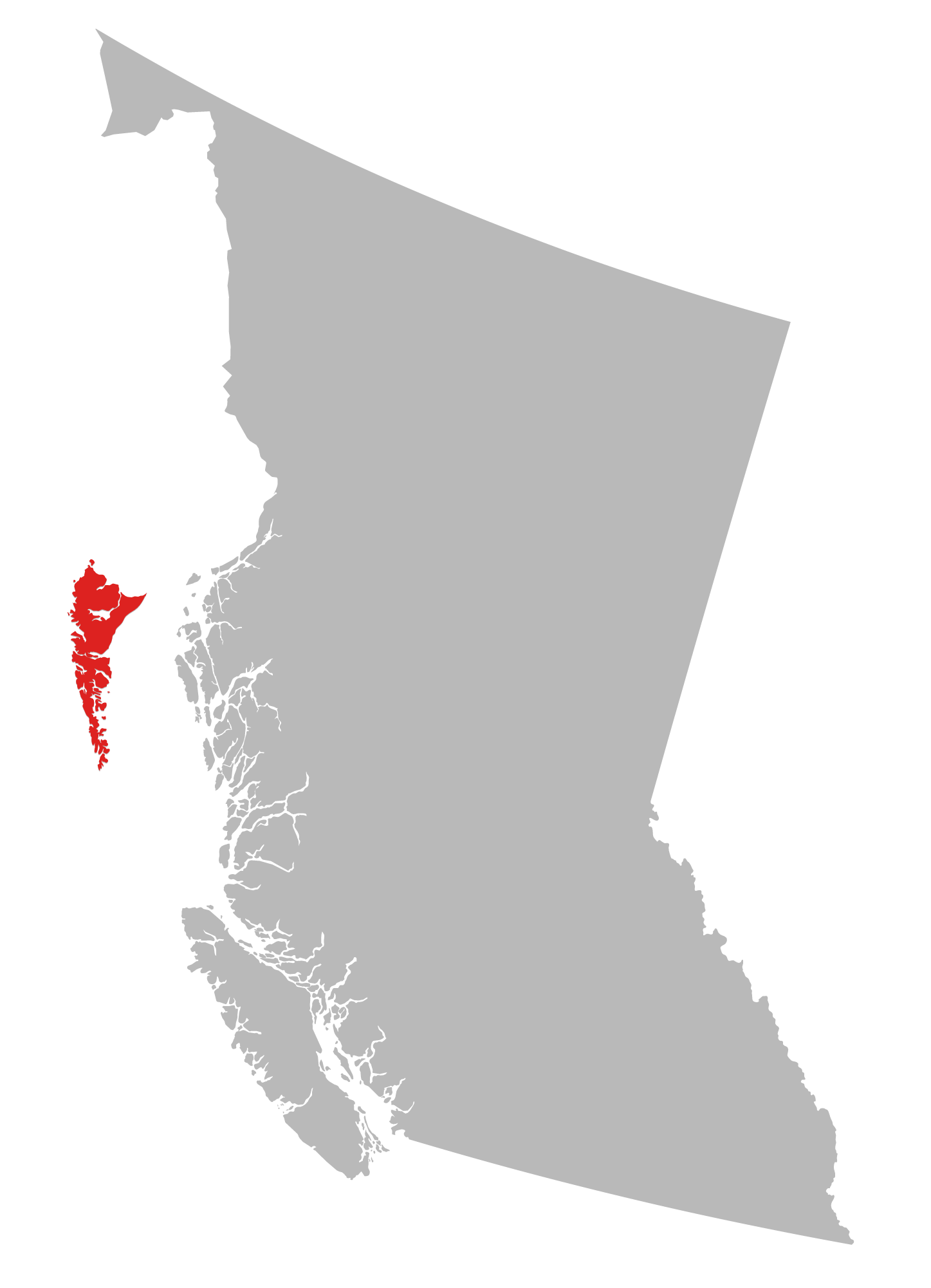
- Haida Gwaii and British Columbia
- Largest village: Skidegate
- Official languages: Haida; English
- Demonym: Haida
- Type: Indigenous Government

Government
  - President: Kil tlaats 'gaa (Peter Lantin)
  - Vice President: Ginn wadluu un uula isdaa ayaagang (Trevor Russ)
  - Regional Representatives for HlG̱aagilda (Skidegate): Gaagwiis (Jason Aslop); Kung Xangajii (Shawn Cowpar); Huux̱ (Percy Crosby); Guud Yuwans (William Russ)
  - Regional Representatives for G̱aaw (Old Massett): Kung Xyaalas (Tyler Bellis); Kaad Giidee (Robert Bennett); Xylang Jaad Xylaa (Leslie Brown); Stephen "Buck" Grosse
  - Regional Representatives for T'agwan (Vancouver): David Smith; Giinowaan (Earnest Swanson)
  - Regional Representatives for Kxeen (Prince Rupert): Kaakuns (Pansy Collison); Dave Dellil
  - Representative for the Skidegate Band Council: Billy Yovanovich, Chief Councillor
  - Representative for the Old Massett Village Council: Ken Rea, Chief Councillor
- Legislature: Multicameral Citizen Legislature: House of Assembly; Elected Government: Council of the Haida Nation; Hereditary Leadership: Hereditary Chiefs Council; Local Governments: Village Councils
- Establishment: 7 December 1974
- History
  - Established: 1974

Area
  - Total: 10,180 km^{2} (3,930 sq mi)

Population
  - 2016 estimate: 1,845 on Haida Gwaii; 2,000 elsewhere
  - Density: 0.181/km^{2} (0.5/sq mi)
- Currency: Canadian dollar
- Time zone: Pacific
- Calling code: +1 250
- Website www.haidanation.ca

The Council of the Haida Nation (CHN; Haida: X̱aaydaG̱a Waadlux̱an Naay) is the elected government of the Haida people, the Indigenous occupants of the Haida Gwaii archipelago in the Canadian province of British Columbia. The council consists of a president and vice-president elected by popular vote, twelve regional representatives from four electoral regions, and one appointed representative from each of the Old Massett Village Council and Skidegate Band Council.

The CHN was formed in 1974, with the goal of organizing the Haida nation to seek recognition of Aboriginal title throughout Haida Gwaii. In April 2024, after 20 years of negotiations, the CHN and the Government of British Columbia signed the "Rising Tide" Haida Title Lands Agreement (Haida: Gaayhllxid/Gíhlagalgang), which recognized Haida Aboriginal title throughout the entirety of Haida Gwaii, and which will see the transfer of all Crown land to the Haida Nation. In February 2025, the Government of Canada also recognized Haida title with the signing of the Big Tide (Haida: Chiix̲uujin · Chaaw K̲aawga) agreement.

There are two main Haida villages on Haida Gwaii: Old Massett (Haida: G̱aw) and Skidegate (Haida: Hlg̱aagilda). Haida populations in Prince Rupert (Haida: Kxeen) and Vancouver (Haida: T'agwan) are also represented in the CHN. The CHN recognizes the separate jurisdiction of the Kaigani Haida, in southern Alaska, who are members of the Haida Nation, but are governed by the Central Council of the Tlingit and Haida Indian Tribes of Alaska.

== Mandate ==
The Mandate is an order for the Council of the Haida Nation. The Council follows the Mandate to the best of their abilities.

The Mandate acknowledges the following:

- The Council shall strive for full independence, sovereignty and self-sufficiency of the Haida Nation.
- The Council must care for the lands and waters of the Nation area.
- The Council must preserve the language and culture of the Haida people.
- The Council must aim for independence of the Haida Nation.
- The Council must serve the best interests of the Nation in ways that align with the Constitution.
- The Council must encourage co-existence with other Nations, yet maintain the policies and interests of the Haida Nation.
- The Council must aim to improve the rights of all Indigenous peoples.
- The Council must create land policies which account for the resources available within the land.
- The Council must regulate citizen access to land resources.
- The Council must designate process for land use which account for the resources available within Haida Gwaii.
- The Council must deal with any external affairs within the Haida Nation.
- The Council must be the defence for the Haida Nation.
- The Council must update Haida citizens quarterly at formal meetings. This excludes any necessarily confidential information.
- The Vice President must advertise for the Council quarterly meetings at least seven days in advance to the meeting date.
- The Council must record meetings.
- The Council have the official publication as "Haida Laas".

== Languages ==
The constitution acknowledges the Haida language (X̱aad Kil and X̱aayda Kil) and English as the official languages of the Haida Nation.

== Governance ==
The House of Assembly is a legal form of Haida National government. This group has the right to pass laws which align with the Constitution of the Haida Nation. The House of Assembly meets yearly with the Council of the Haida Nation. These meetings occur in October during the third week of the month. Each yearly meeting alternates between G̱aaw (Old Masset) and Hlg̱aagilda (Skidegate). In addition to the House of Assembly meetings, the Council of the Haida Nation meet quarterly with Haida citizens.

The Vice President calls the House of Assembly meeting twenty days before the meeting date. They may also call other meeting dates if required, again, at least twenty days before the scheduled date. All motions placed through the House of Assembly can only be approved by a vote of three-quarter approval or more.

== Secretariat ==
The Council of the Haida Nation sustains a Secretariat. The duties of the Secretariat are as follows: the Secretariat answers to both the House of Assembly and the Council of the Haida Nation, the Secretariat acts as Treasurer and will manage the staff of the Council of the Haida Nation, and the Secretariat has multiple rights to the credit of the Council of the Haida Nation.

== Subsidiary bodies (Village Councils) ==
The Village Councils are concerned with the well-being of the communities and Band members. The Village Councils may initiate laws.

=== Skidegate Band Council ===
Chief Councillor: Billy Yovanovich

Councillors: Duane Alsop, Lyndale George, David Crosby, Michelle McDonald, Trent Moraes, Michelle Pineault, Robert Russ.

=== Old Masset Village Council ===
Chief Councillor: Donald (Duffy) Edgars

Councillors: Brodie Swanson (Deputy), Lisa White, Cecil Brown, Ashley Jacobson, Robert Brown, Brodie Swanson, Benjamin Edgars

== Citizenship ==
The Haida citizenship act was approved on 31 May 2017. When accepted as a Haida Nation citizen, one receives both a Card and a Certificate. The card is used for identification purposes, and the certificate is the official citizenship document. The Constitution of the Haida Nation states that the title of Haida Gwaii Citizen may be given to an individual who does not have Haida ancestry. This title does not include receiving Haida indigenous rights or Haida heritage claims.
