= Naden Harbour =

Harbour located in British Columbia, Canada

Coordinates: 54°00′00″N 132°36′00″W

Naden Harbour is a harbour on the north coast of Graham Island on Haida Gwaii (formerly known as the Queen Charlotte Islands), British Columbia, Canada. The locality of Naden Harbour, British Columbia is located on its western shore. Cape Naden is the point on the west side of the entrance to Virago Sound, which is at the entrance to Naden Harbour.
