= 1862 Pacific Northwest smallpox epidemic =

Disease outbreak in North America

- Disease: Smallpox
- Location: Pacific Northwest
- First outbreak: Victoria, British Columbia
- Arrival date: 12 March 1862
- Date: 1862–1863
- Deaths: 20,000+

The 1862 Pacific Northwest smallpox epidemic was a major outbreak of smallpox that began in Victoria, on Vancouver Island, and quickly spread among Indigenous peoples across the Pacific Northwest Coast and the Northwest Plateau. Over the course of 1862 and 1863, the disease swept along the coast from Puget Sound to Southeast Alaska, causing devastating loss of life and permanently altering Indigenous societies throughout the region.

While colonial authorities worked to contain the disease among settlers through vaccination and quarantine, fewer measures were taken to protect Indigenous communities. As a result, the epidemic continued to spread unchecked in many areas, leading to devastating loss of life and long-lasting demographic, social, and political consequences in what is now British Columbia and the northwestern United States.

== Background ==
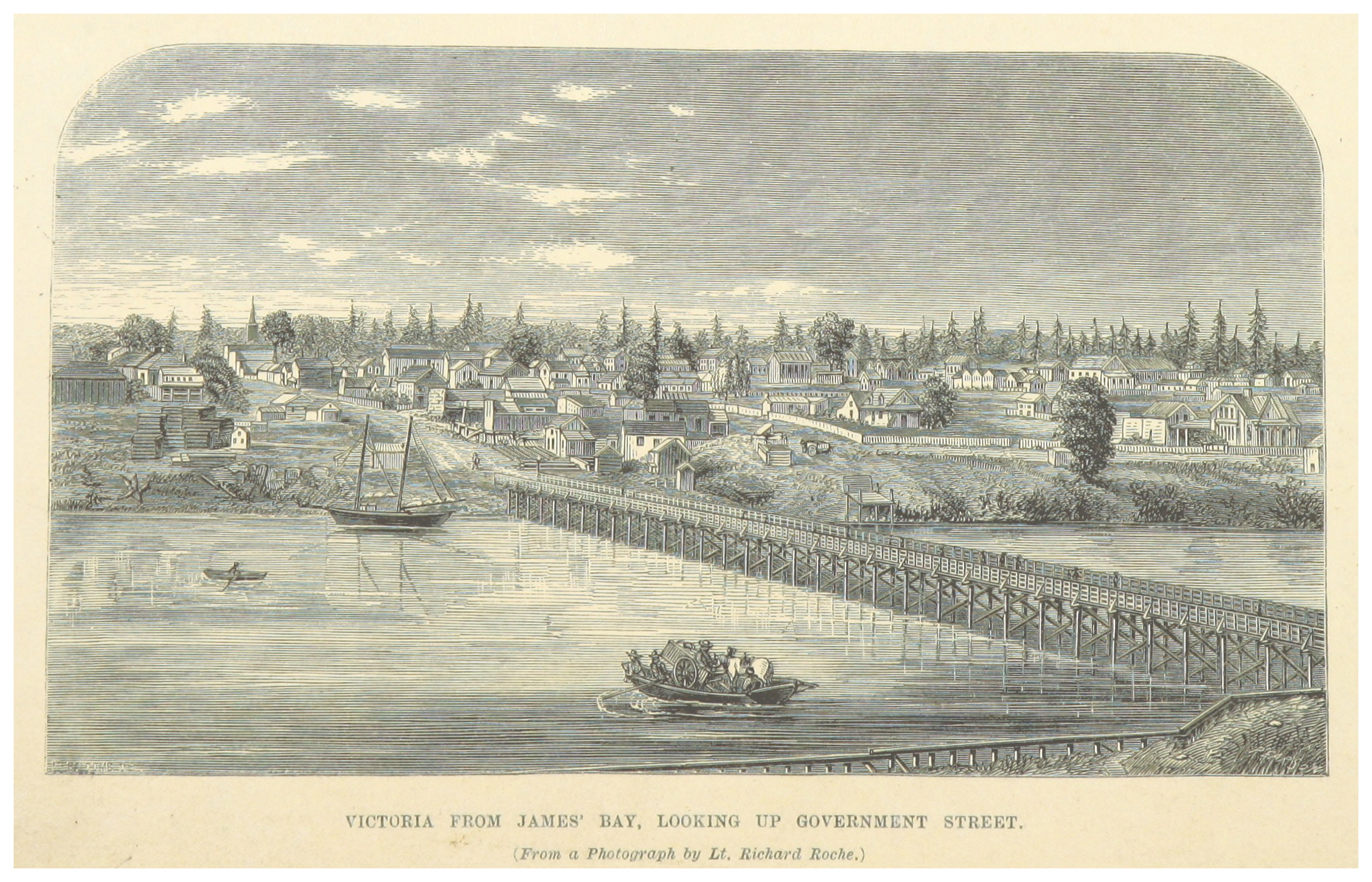
Victoria, British Columbia in 1862, the year of the outbreak

Pacific Northwest Indigenous peoples experienced several earlier smallpox epidemics, about once per generation after European contact began in the late 18th century: in the late 1770s, 1801–1803, 1836–1838, and 1853. Each outbreak is estimated to have killed between 30% and 90% of the Indigenous population.

Fort Victoria, which began as a Hudson's Bay Company fur trading fort, experienced a massive population boom in 1858, when it became the way station for prospectors en route to the Fraser Canyon Gold Rush. By 1862, the population of Victoria had grown from 500 to about 4,000–5,000 colonists. In addition to the influx of colonists after 1858, there were also several large semi-permanent camps of non-local First Nations around Victoria. The largest, known as the "Northern Encampment", had been in place since 1858 and was populated by First Nations from the north coast, namely the Tsimshian, Haida, Tlingit, Heiltsuk, and Kwakwakaʼwakw. There were also Songhees villages and other First Nations people from nearby areas, including Halkomelem and Wakashan speaking peoples, such as the Sto:lo and Nuu-chah-nulth.

== Introduction and spread of smallpox ==
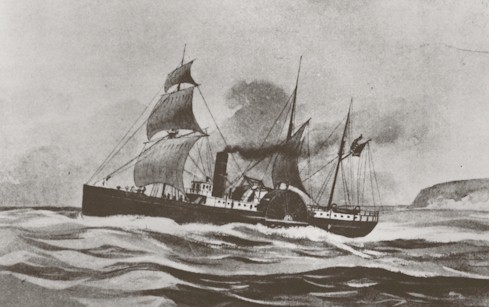
The Brother Jonathan docked at Victoria's Esquimalt Harbour on 12 March 1862, carrying smallpox infected passengers from San Francisco.

The steamship Brother Jonathan arrived at Victoria on 12 March 1862 and left the next day. On 18 March The Daily British Colonist reported one passenger had the disease. A second case was reported on 19 March. By 22 March this second infected person was in the Lower Mainland at New Westminster, having travelled across the Strait of Georgia on the Otter. On 24 March another vessel from San Francisco, the Oregon arrived with at least one passenger infected with smallpox. California was struggling with smallpox at the time, but vaccinations and other preventative measures had kept the death toll relatively low.

== Government actions and policy ==
In late March, the newspaper The Daily British Colonist published the first of several articles calling upon the government to take action, including quarantine and vaccination, to control the spread of smallpox among colonists as well as First Nations people camped near Victoria.

By 1 April, about half of the colonists in Victoria had been vaccinated. On the same day, the first case in a First Nation person was reported.

It is unclear how large a supply of the smallpox vaccine was available. Some sources stated that there was a shortage of vaccines.

During May, 3,400 Indians along the lower Fraser River were reportedly vaccinated, as were others, in Puget Sound and the Strait of Georgia. These groups avoided many deaths from the epidemic.

Governor James Douglas enlisted Hudson's Bay Company physician Dr. John Helmcken to vaccinate the Songhees.

In April, when the outbreak was just starting, Dr. John Sebastian Helmcken vaccinated about 500 Songhees. On 29 April the Songhees abandoned their villages and moved to Discovery Island in Haro Strait. Due to this and Dr. Helmcken's vaccines the Songhees survived the epidemic with few deaths.

Most of the Halkomelem-speaking people of the Lower Mainland were saved due to the vaccination efforts of missionaries. The Catholic Oblate missionary Leon Fouquet and his partner Father Pandosy vaccinated a large number Halkomelem peoples such as the Cowichan Quwutsun, as well as some members of other groups like the Squamish and Shishalh.

Fourquet also sent a large supply of vaccine to Casimir Chirouse at Tulalip. Chirouse vaccinated most of the Tulalip and Nooksack people. In August, when smallpox arrived in the Puget Sound area the Tulalip and Nooksack were mostly safe, while other Indigenous Peoples were devastated. The Anglican missionary John Good vaccinated the Snuneymuxw.

Some Hudson's Bay Company officials took part in vaccination efforts, such as Hamilton Moffat who vaccinated over 100 First Nations near Fort Rupert, and William Manson who vaccinated "a large number" at Fort Kamloops. Despite Manson's efforts he reported "violent outbreaks" of smallpox in the Kamloops area.

Some Indigenous People(s) attempted to inoculate themselves, although how many and how effective it was is not known.

Little was done to prevent smallpox from spreading to the other First Nations encamped near Victoria.

Two missionaries tended to the sick at the Northern Encampment and asked for government assistance. The colonial police commissioner, Augustus Pemberton, said the colony had no authority to interfere or even help bury the dead.

== Forced removals and deaths near Victoria ==
On 28 April, the Daily British Colonist called upon the government to "remove...the entire Indian population" from the Victoria area. Pemberton, with Governor Douglas's permission, ordered the Tsimshians to leave within one day, had a gunboat stationed to enforce the order, and placed armed guards around Victoria to prevent First Nations people from entering.

Most of the Tsimshians left on 1 May, along with a number of Haida and Tlingit. However, during May the epidemic continued to ravage the First Nations people still living in the Northern Encampment. Many moved to other nearby camps. The Haida set up a large camp at Cadboro Bay.

In early May, two gunboats arrived; HMS Grappler and HMS Forward. On 11 May, Police Commissioner Pemberton brought the gunboats and many policemen to Cadboro Bay. They forced about 300 First Nation people to evacuate in 26 canoes. One of the gunboats towed the canoes.

When the Cadboro Bay camp was empty the police went to what remained of the Northern Encampment and burned all the dwellings, leaving about 200 Haidas with no canoes.

On 13 May, the Daily British Colonist reported that these Haida were to be evicted "to one of the islands in the Straits—there to rot and die with the loathsome disease which is now destroying the poor wretches at the rate of six each day."

They were taken to San Juan Island where they died at a place today called Smallpox Bay.

Police efforts to drive the First Nation peoples away from Victoria continued through late May, as small groups still remained near Victoria. Reports of First Nations people dying of smallpox near Victoria continued into June.

The number of First Nations deaths near Victoria in 1862 is not known, but on 11 June, newspapers reported about 1,000 to 1,200 unburied Northern First Nations corpses just west of Victoria.

== Spread to the north ==
Starting in May 1862, thousands of infected First Nations people were evicted from the Victoria area and forced to return to their homes in the north, all along the coast from Nanaimo to the Stikine River in southeast Alaska. Unlike the region around the Salish Sea the northern coast had less previous exposure to smallpox and no vaccines available.

As the disease spread First Nations people suffered devastating losses. There are no first-hand accounts of the initial stages of the epidemic in the north. By mid-June Victoria newspapers began receiving reports of the toll the disease was taking. The Pentlatch, Eeksen, and Qualicom peoples were greatly reduced and merged with the K'ómoks (Comox). Although a few Shishalh people had been vaccinated the nation as a whole was devastated.

Many Kwakwakaʼwakw lived near Fort Rupert, on northern Vancouver Island. Over the summer of 1862 various ships reported high death tolls. The disease reduced the Kwakwakaʼwakw population by over 50%. Likewise there were harrowing reports about the Heiltsuk people of the Bella Bella area. On 18 July 1862 the Daily British Colonist reported that smallpox had killed about 60% of the Heiltsuk people.

Robert Boyd estimates the Heiltsuk population fell by about 72% due to the epidemic. Many villages were abandoned and survivors soon moved to the consolidated settlement at Bella Bella. Large areas of traditional Heiltsuk territory were abandoned. By 1899 the Heiltsuk population had dropped to 319, almost all at Bella Bella. The Nuxalk people were also decimated by smallpox, with a loss of about 58%, and a similar abandonment of villages and whole regions, with consolidation at Bella Coola.

The Haida people suffered the most from this smallpox epidemic. Haida Gwaii experienced a large amount of village abandonment and consolidation. No contemporary accounts describe what happened when the first infected Haida returned, but later reports suggest that smallpox circulated among Haida villages for over a year killing about 72% of the Haida people.

Many historic Haida villages were abandoned in the years following the epidemic, including Ninstints, Kloo, Skedans, Cumshewa, Dadens, Haina, Hiellen, Kung, Klinkwan, and "Old" Kasaan, among others. Survivors consolidated in four main settlements: Skidegate, Masset, Hydaburg, and "New" Kasaan.

The Tsimshian forced away from Victoria brought smallpox to Fort Simpson, whence it spread widely starting in June 1862. By early July the First Nations settlement outside the fort was deserted due to deaths and people fleeing the area. The Tsimshian settlement at Metlakatla had only just been founded by the missionary William Duncan, who intended it to be a utopian Christian community. Duncan was able to quarantine Metlakatla by refusing to allow First Nations people who showed any signs of smallpox to be admitted. His efforts resulted in Metlakatla being mostly spared from the disease.

Duncan also used the epidemic to proselytize, saying that the epidemic had been sent by God as a punishment for the sins of the Tsimshian, and that those who repented and "came to Jesus" and were baptized would be spared. Duncan also recorded news about the spread of the disease up the Skeena River, and elsewhere, as refugees sought entrance to Metlakatla.

Tlingits driven from Victoria brought smallpox to the Stikine River area. Some of the refugees were escorted by the gunboat HMS Topaz all the way from Victoria to Russian America. No records survive of the situation in the Stikine area during July and August, when the epidemic was likely at its height.

In early September HMS Devastation visited the area and noted major population loss and the continuing spread of smallpox. The epidemic spread north into the Alexander Archipelago but was limited due to an extensive Russian vaccination program. Some Tlingit groups had not been part of the Russian program and these were decimated by the disease, especially the Henya Tlingit of northern Prince of Wales Island. The Mainland Tlingit suffered losses of about 60%, and the Island Tlingit about 37%.

Other First Nations people who suffered major population loss include the Saanich (about 72%), Nisga'a (about 37%), Gitxsan (about 22%), Sabassas or Kitkatla Tsimshian (about 67%), Wuikinuxv (Oweekeno), as well as the interior nations of the Nlaka'pamux, Stʼatʼimc, Dakelh, Tsilhqotʼin, and Secwepemc, among others.

Two-thirds of British Columbia First Nations died—around 20,000 people. The death rate was highest in southeast Alaska and Haida Gwaii—over 70% among the Haida and 60% among the Tlingit. Almost all First Nations along the coast, and many in the interior, were devastated, with a death rate of over 50% for the entire coast from Puget Sound to Sitka, Alaska, then part of Russian America. In some areas the Indigenous population fell by as much as 90%. The disease was controlled among colonists in 1862 but it continued to spread among Indigenous populations through 1863.

== Aftermath ==
Up until the 1862–1863 epidemic, the British colonial authorities acquired First Nations land through treaties. Governor James Douglas had signed 14 land cession treaties on Vancouver Island, known as the Douglas Treaties. In 1864, after the epidemic, the colony's Chief Commissioner of Land and Works Joseph Trutch decided to stop recognizing Aboriginal title and abandon the treaty process. This set the precedent of British Columbia taking First Nations' land by fiat rather than treaty.

The large population losses also caused widespread Indigenous village abandonment and consolidation, cultural loss, and increased conflict and hostility with colonists. In Haida Gwaii, following the 1862 epidemic, over nineteen villages diminished to four by the early 20th century.

Settlers started occupying empty land that First Nation groups had left following the devastation of the epidemic with hopes of later returning. Some groups resisted encroachment, including the Tsilhqotʼin who resisted when settlers started to build a wagon road through their territory without permission, leading to the Chilcotin War in 1864. One of the foremen of the road-building project threatened the Tsilhqotʼin with smallpox. The war ended with the hanging of six Tsilhqotʼin chiefs. In 2014, British Columbia Premier Christy Clark formally exonerated the executed chiefs and apologized for these acts, acknowledging that "there is an indication [that smallpox] was spread intentionally."

== Allegation of genocide ==
Some historians have described the epidemic as a deliberate genocide because the Colony of Vancouver Island and the Colony of British Columbia could have prevented the epidemic but chose not to, and in some ways facilitated it.

While colonial authorities used quarantine, smallpox vaccine, and inoculation to keep the disease from spreading among colonists and settlers, it was largely allowed to spread among First Nations people. The Colony of Vancouver Island made attempts to save some First Nations people, but most were forced to leave the vicinity of Victoria and go back to their homelands, despite awareness that it would result in a major smallpox epidemic among First Nations along the Pacific Northwest coast.

Many colonists and newspapers were vocally in favour of expulsion. The situation in the Puget Sound region was similar, with newspapers encouraging settlers to get vaccinated, but with little effort towards protecting First Nations people. Most papers supported removing First Nations people. The effect of the epidemic in the Puget Sound area is not well documented and it appears it did not spread south beyond the Chehalis people of the Chehalis River area.

According to historian Kiran van Rijn, "opportunistic self-interest, coupled with hollow pity, revulsion at the victims, and smug feelings of inevitability, shaped the colonial response to the epidemic among First Nations"; and that for some residents of Victoria the eviction of First Nations people was a "long-sought opportunity" to be rid of them; and, for some, an opportunity to take over First Nations lands.

At the time, and still today, some First Nations people say that the colonial government deliberately spread smallpox for the purpose of stealing their land.

== See also ==
- List of epidemics
- 1770s Pacific Northwest smallpox epidemic
- Population history of Indigenous peoples of the Americas
- Native American disease and epidemics
- 1837 Great Plains smallpox epidemic
- Fraser Canyon Gold Rush
- List of notable disease outbreaks in the United States
