= Virago Sound =

Coordinates: 54°05′20″N 132°31′24″W

Virago Sound is a sound on the north coast of the Graham Island in the Queen Charlotte Islands, British Columbia, Canada, at the entrance to Naden Harbour.

The sound is named for HMS Virago, a Royal Navy sloop-of-war surveying these waters in 1853, under the command of Master George H. Inskip. The Haida name for Virago Sound was "tin-eye", meaning "big"

In 1792 Captain Ingraham of the brig Hope had named these waters Port Crafts after his first mate, John Croft or Cruft:

"In 1791, Captain Joseph Ingraham on the small brig Hope out of Boston, Massachusetts, spent time along the British Columbia coast trading for furs at Native American villages. His first officer was John Cruft. In Ingraham's logbook (original in the Smithsonian Library, Washington, DC) he mentions that he named an anchorage "Cruft's Cove after my chief officer...." (volume ii, p.80). This occurred a year (or possibly two) prior to the arrival of Captain Vancouver to the area."

(Information provided to the BCGNIS January 2008 by John Bakke, Portland, Oregon, descendant of John Cruft)
