= Old Massett =

Masset 1 Gaw Tlagée
- First Nation reserve
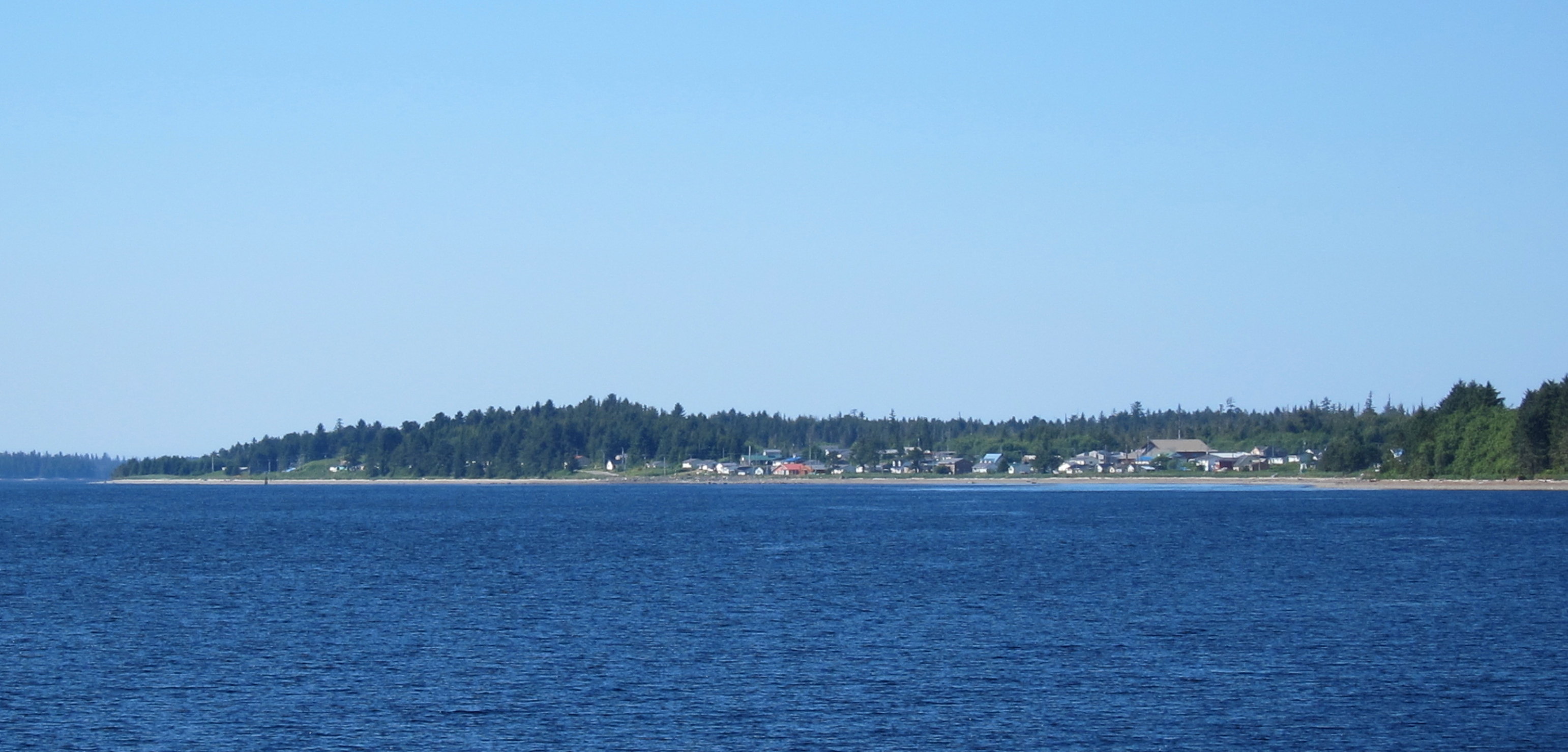
- Old Massett, from the Masset town pier
- Nickname: Old Massett
- Interactive map of Masset 1
- Coordinates: 54.040°N 132.188°W
- Country: Canada
- Province: British Columbia
- Regional district: North Coast
- Region: Haida Gwaii

Government
  - Type: Band government
  - Body: Old Massett Village Council

Area
  - Total: 299.6 ha (740 acres)

Population (2021)
  - Total: 475
  - Density: 159/km^{2} (411/sq mi)
- Time zone: UTC−8 (PST)
  - Summer (DST): UTC−7 (PDT)
- Highways: Highway 16 (TCH)

Old Massett (Haida: Gaw Tlagée) is a reserve on Graham Island in Haida Gwaii, British Columbia. It lies on the east side of Masset Sound close to the town of Masset; the area of land it is on is legally designated Masset Indian Reserve No. 1, or Masset 1. The original name of the settlement was Uttewas, meaning "white-slope village" in the Haida language. It is populated by Haida people of both Ḵuustak, the Eagle matrilineage, and Ḵayx̱al, the Raven matrilineage. The town is administered by the Old Massett Village Council. Its population has fluctuated over the last one hundred and fifty years; smallpox, especially the 1862 Pacific Northwest smallpox epidemic, drastically reduced its numbers in the late 1800s, but in 1968, it had over 1,000 people and was the largest village in Haida Gwaii. In 2009, the Village Council counted 2,698 band members in the area; the 2021 census counted 475 living at the Old Massett townsite.

== History ==
Indian Reserve Masset 1 was allotted by reserve commissioner Peter O'Reilly in July 1882, in his visit to Haida Gwaii. He chose to create a single reserve from the two villages, Uttewas and Kayung, the latter of which he describes as being nearly abandoned. This reserve would measure about 770 acres, not including the land owned by the Hudson's Bay Company and the Church Mission Society.

== Culture ==
Old Massett is home to a number of totem poles:

- Chief Matthews pole by Reg Davidson
- Geoffrey White Memorial pole by Christian White
- Medicine pole by Christian White
- Morris White pole by Christian White
- Skilay (Ernie Collison) by Jim Hart
- Family Center pole by Vernon White
- New Town poles by Todd and Derek White
- Hospital poles by Jordan Seward and Cooper Wilson
- Old Massett poles by Donnie Edenshaw and Jaalen Edenshaw
- Playing field poles by Lawrence Bell
- Morris White memorial pole by Jim Hart and Christian White
- St John's Church pole by Robert Davidson
- Amanda Edgar's memorial pole by Paul White
- Sharkhouse pole by Reg Davidson
- gyaaGang Monumental pole by Kilthguulans Christian White
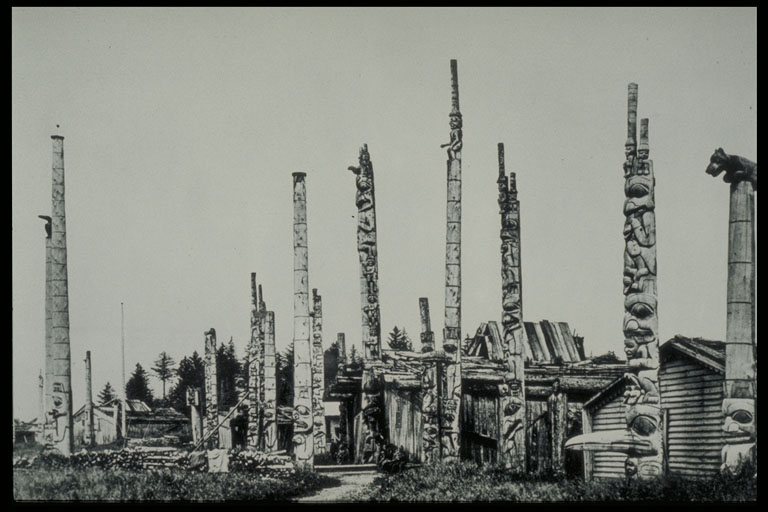

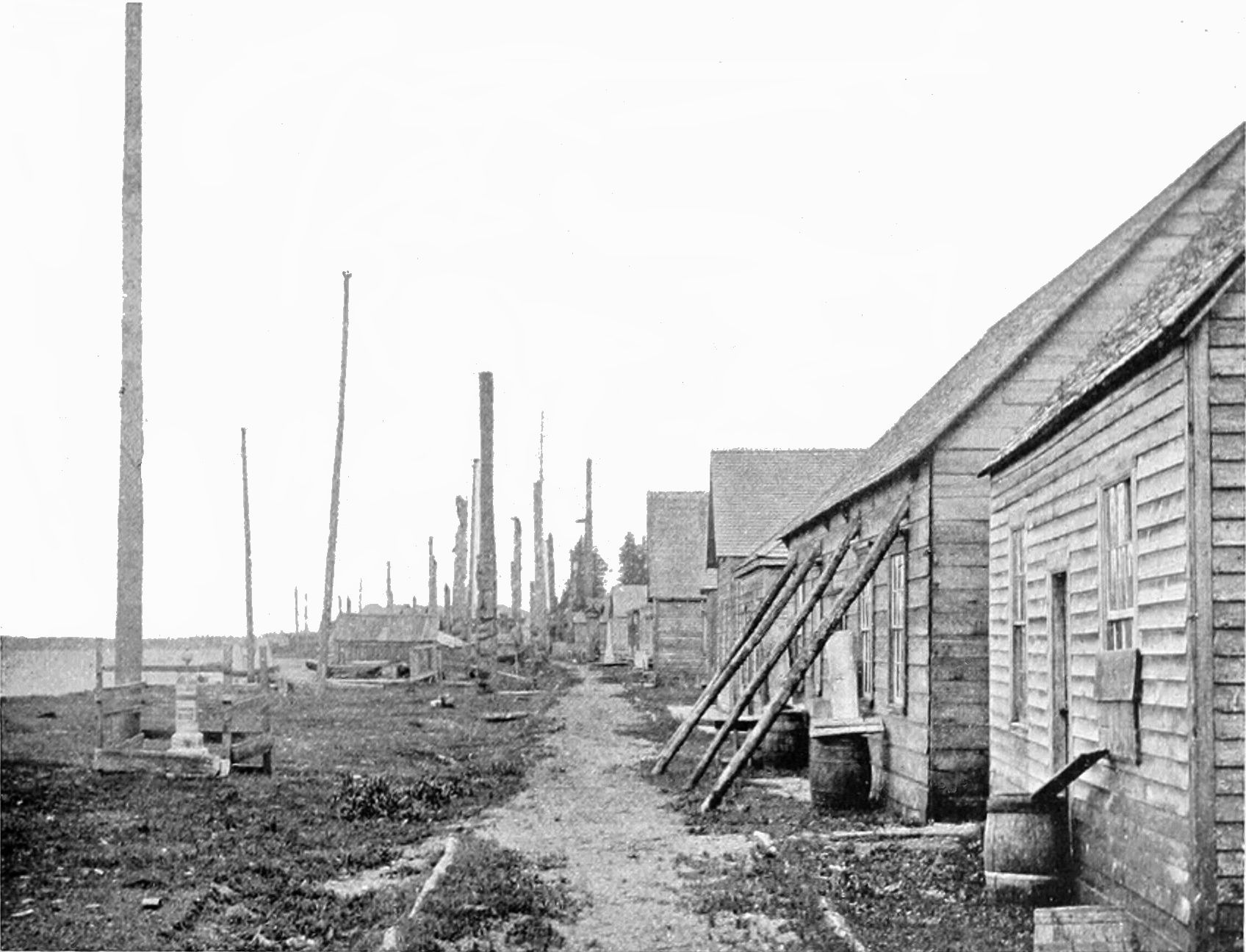

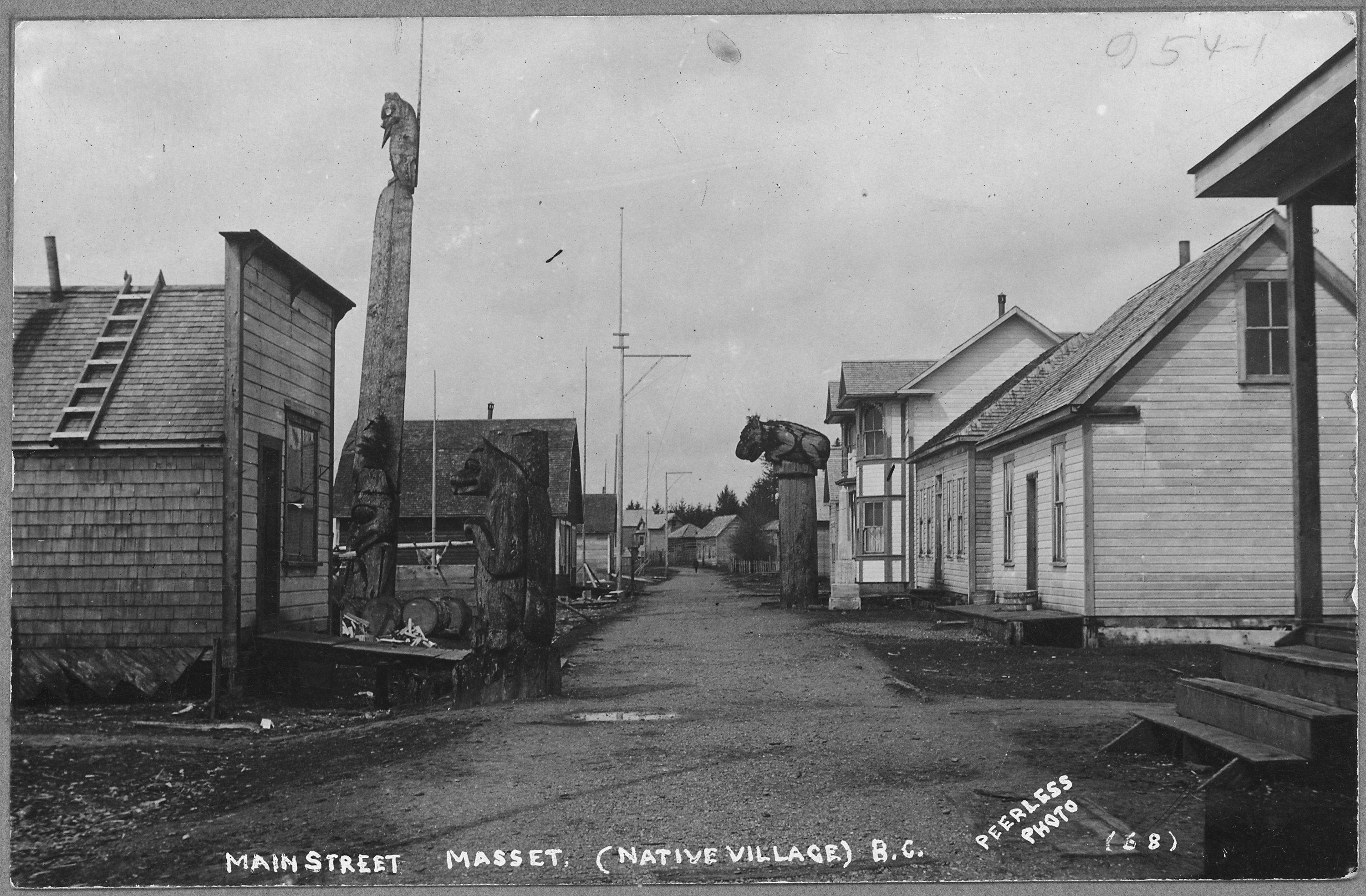

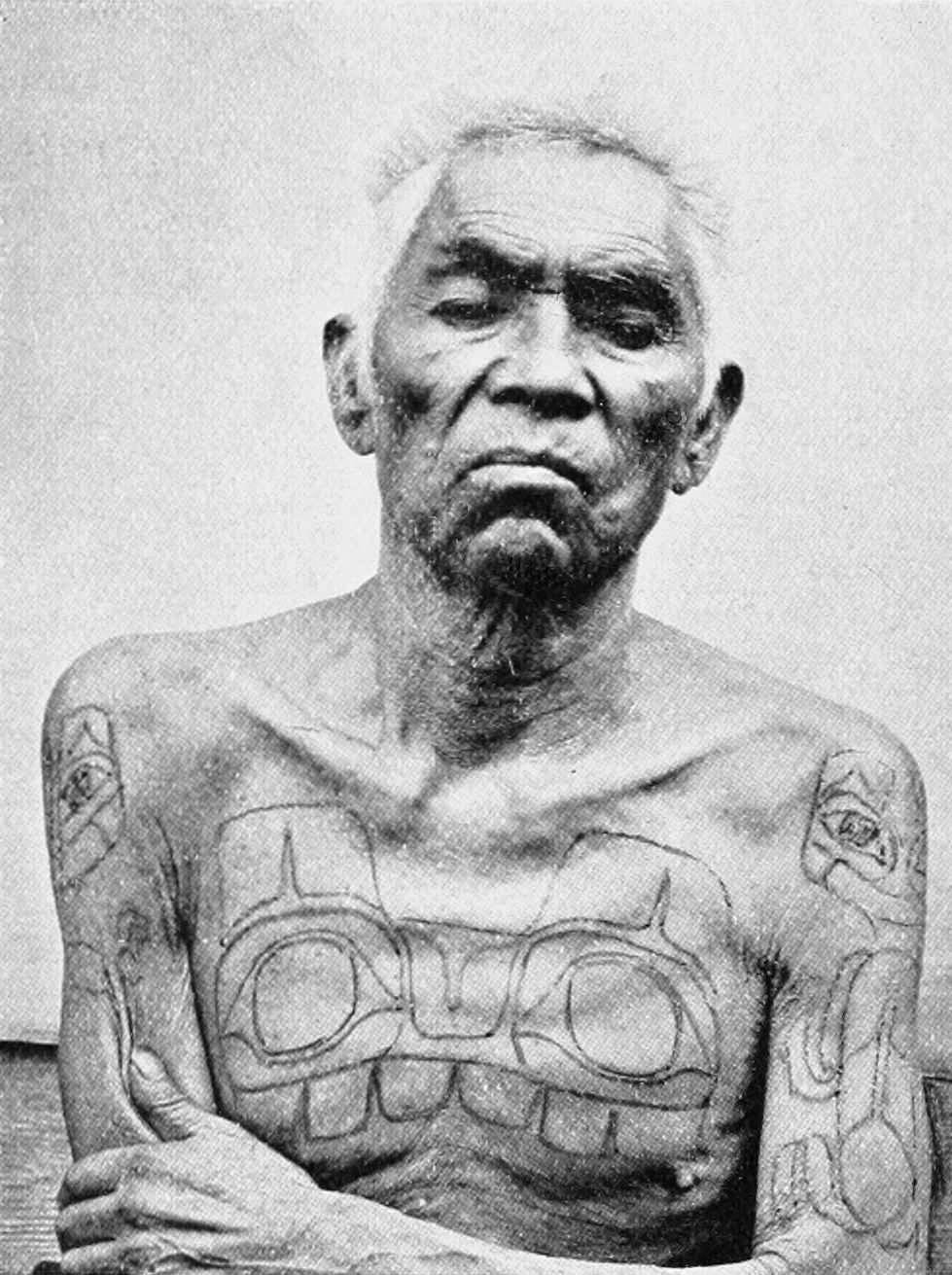

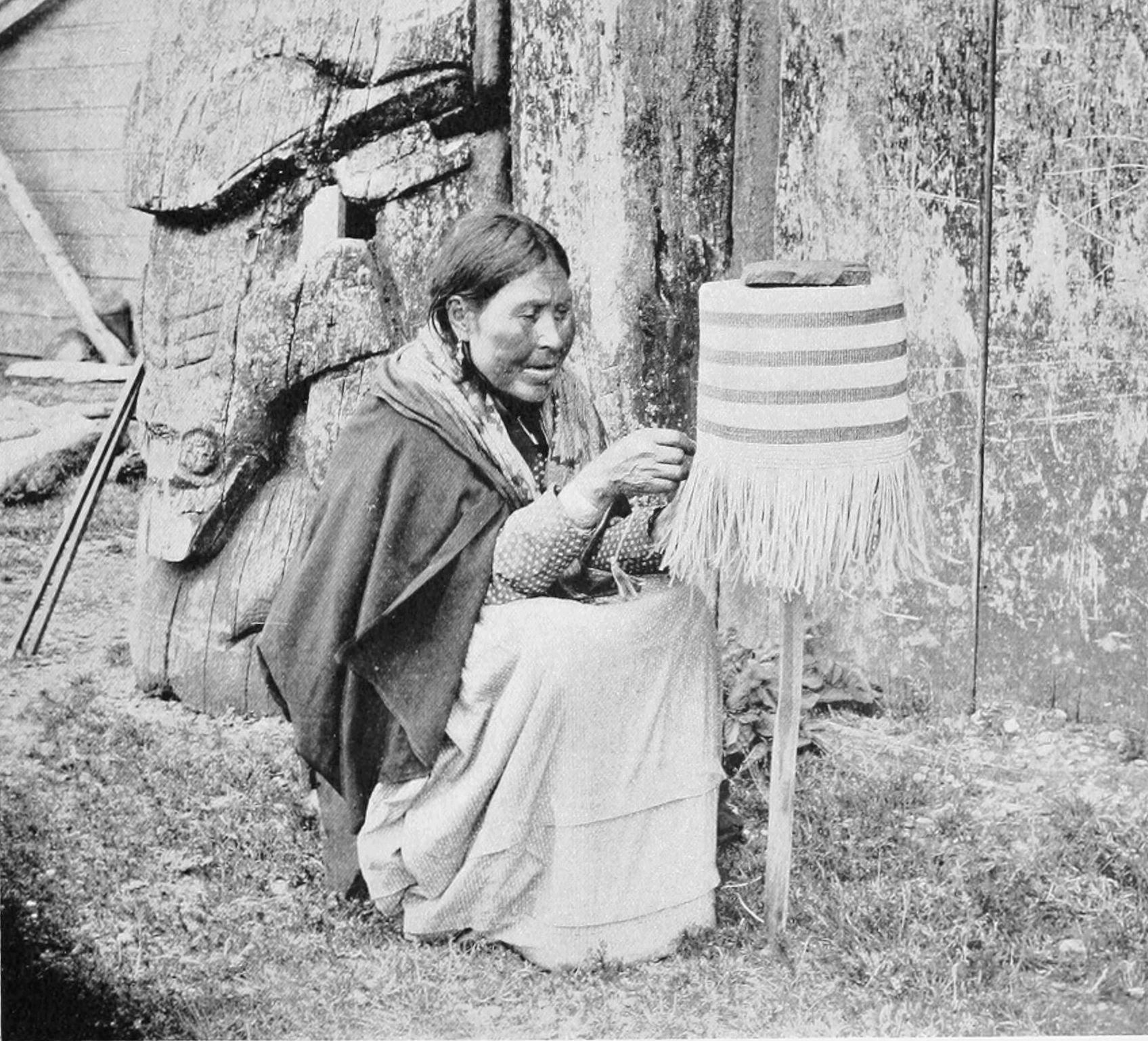

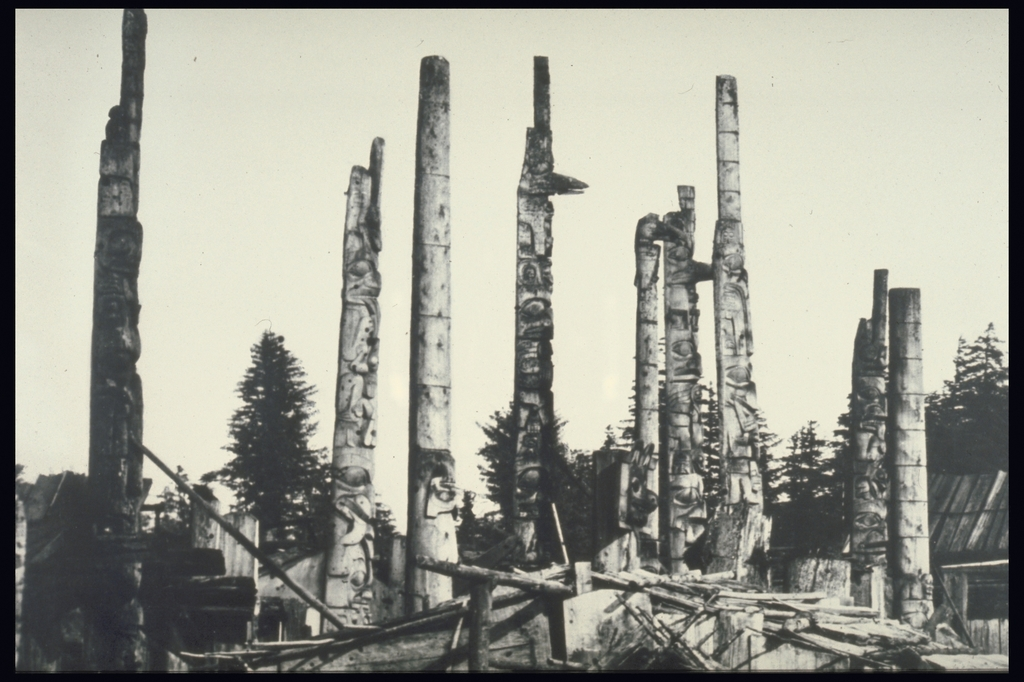

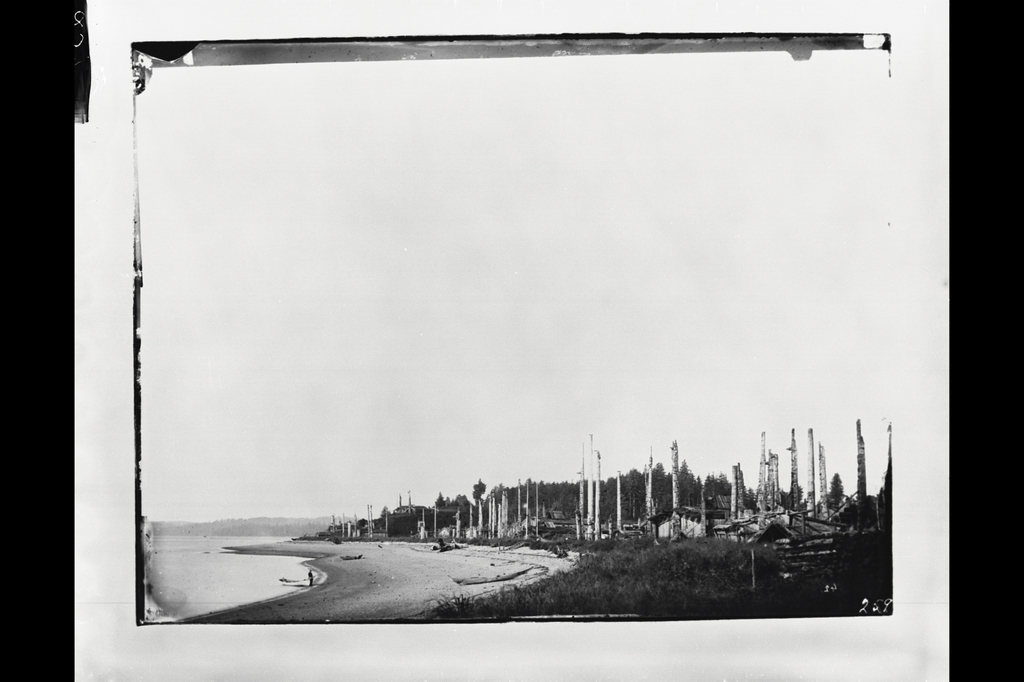

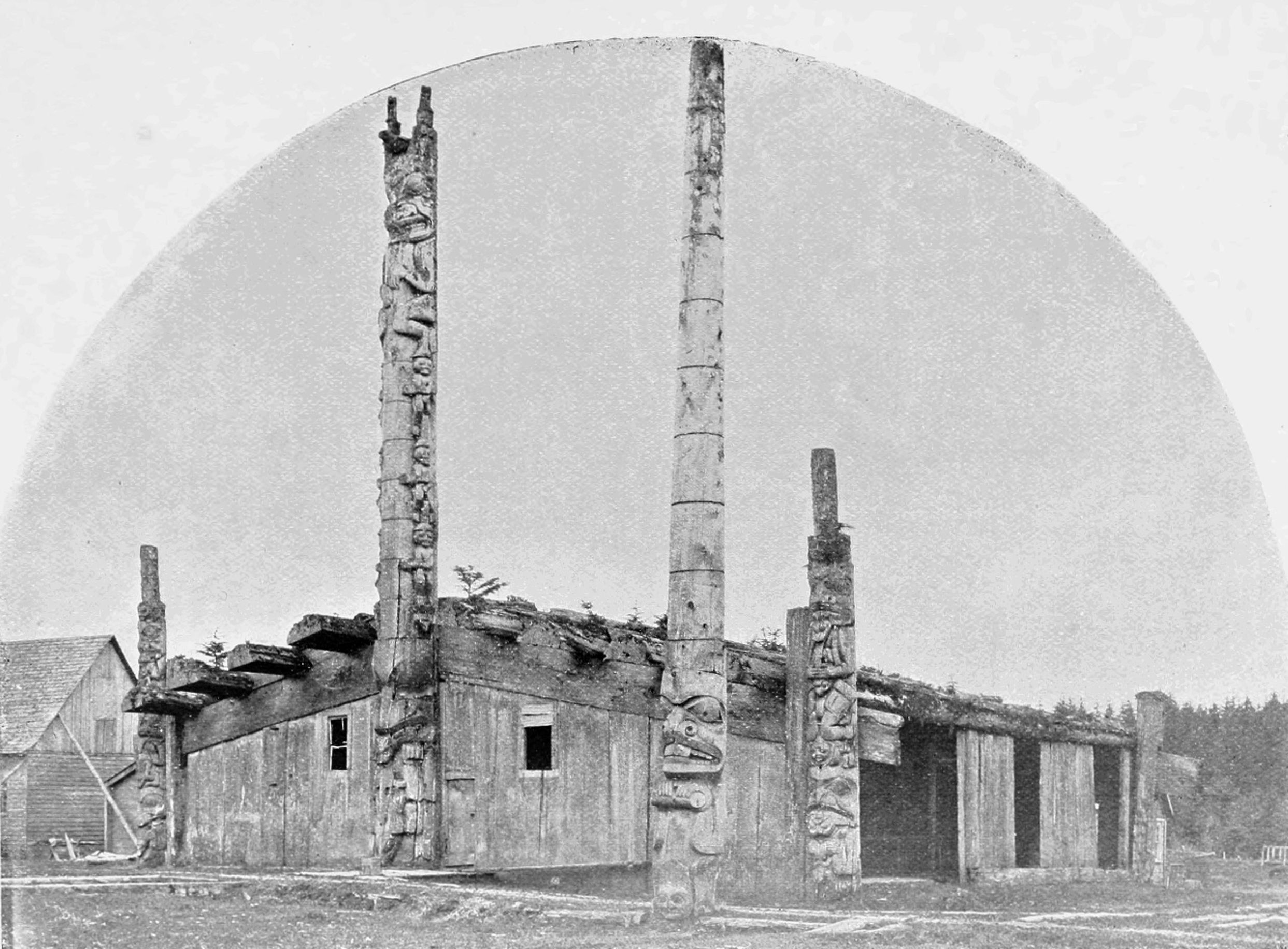

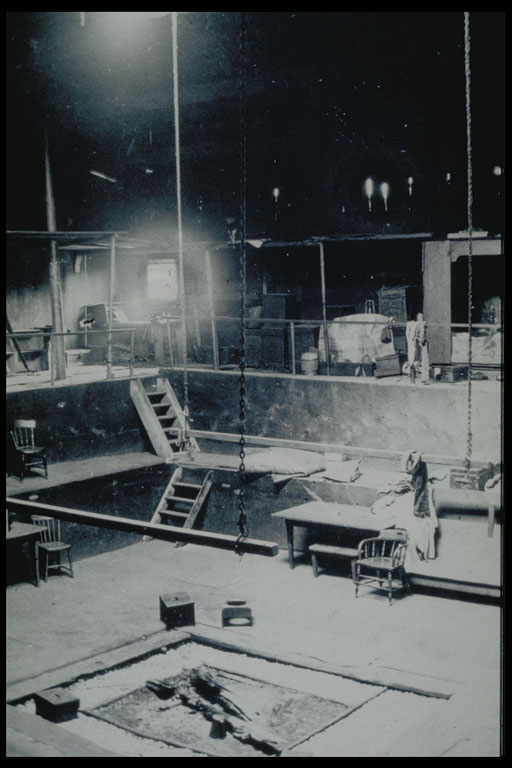

== Popular culture ==
Some Old Massett artists star on the Knowledge Network television series Ravens and Eagles.

== See also ==
- Pitt Rivers Museum in Oxford, England, includes a totem pole that originally stood in front of the Star House in Old Massett. The house belonged to Chief Anetlas (c.1816–1893); it is thought that the house was constructed in 1882. The pole was purchased by Edward Burnett Tylor and transported to the museum in 1901.
