= Naikoon Provincial Park =

Provincial Park in British Columbia

- IUCN category II (national park)
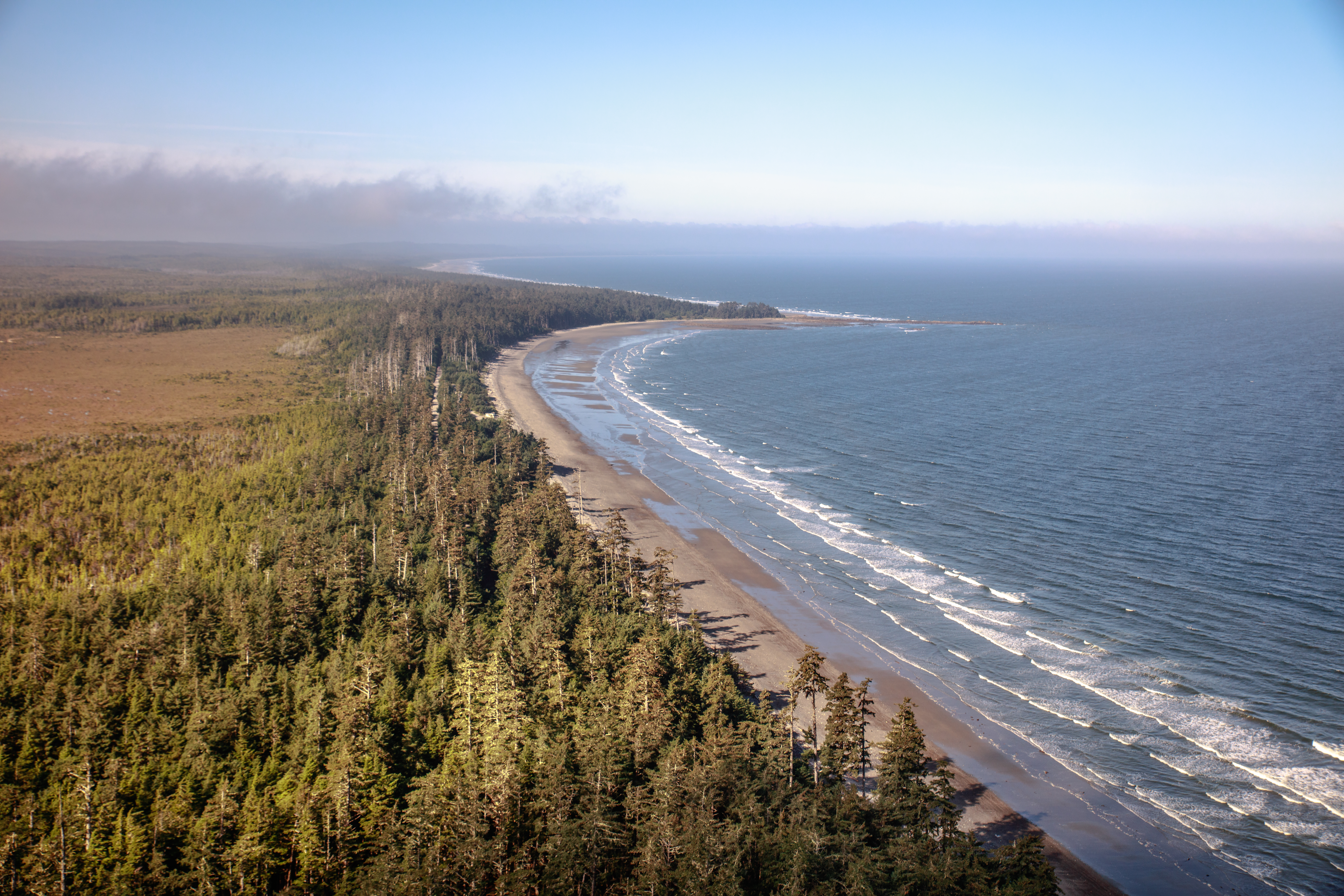
- View of North Beach from Tow Hill

- Location within British Columbia
- Interactive map of Naikoon Provincial Park
- Location: North Coast RD, British Columbia
- Nearest city: Masset
- Coordinates: 53°50′N 131°54′W
- Area: 69,071 ha (266.68 sq mi)
- Established: May 18, 1973
- Governing body: BC Parks

Naikoon Provincial Park is a provincial park on northeastern Graham Island in the Haida Gwaii archipelago, British Columbia, Canada. It is the ancestral home of the Gwak'rala'chala people, one of the many tribes that form the native group Haida. While it is a popular destination for adventurous campers, it is also very secluded, being over 16 km (9.9 mi) away from Masset.

== See also ==
- Duu Guusd Heritage Site/Conservancy
