= Masset =

- Village
- Village of Masset
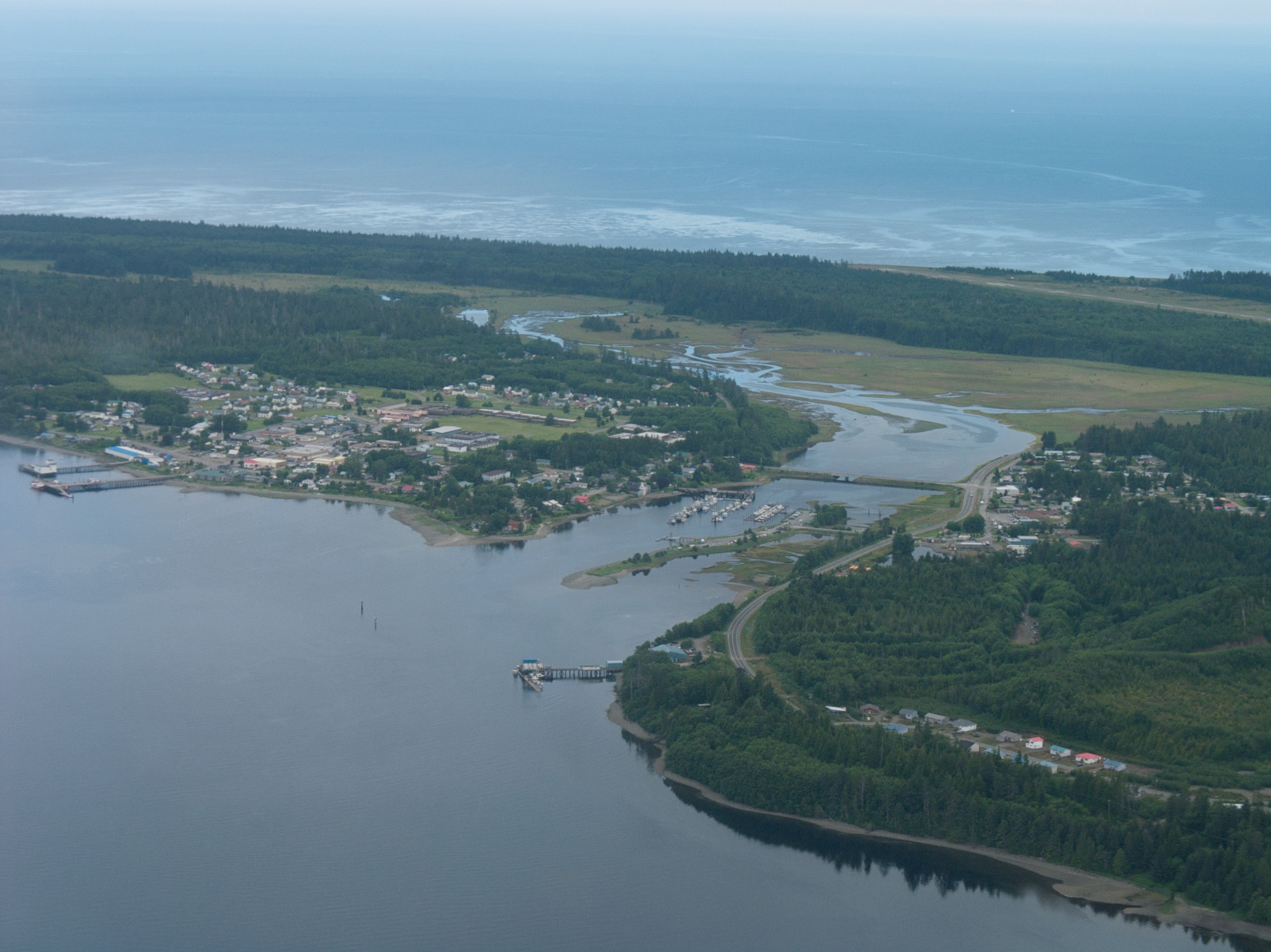

- Location of Masset in British Columbia Masset (Canada)
- Coordinates: 54°00′36″N 132°08′17″W
- Country: Canada
- Province: British Columbia
- Region: Haida Gwaii
- Regional district: North Coast
- Registered: 1907
- Incorporated: 11 May 1961

Government
  - Governing body: Masset Village Council
  - Mayor: Sheri Disney

Area
  - Total: 19.45 km^{2} (7.51 sq mi)
- Elevation: 10 m (33 ft)

Population (2021)
  - Total: 838
  - Density: 43.1/km^{2} (112/sq mi)
- Time zone: UTC−07:00 (PT)
- Highways: Highway 16 (TCH)
- Waterways: Dixon Entrance
- Website: massetbc.com

Masset (/ˈmæsɪt/; formerly Massett) is a village in the Haida Gwaii archipelago in British Columbia, Canada. It is located on Masset Sound on the northern coast of Graham Island, the largest island in the archipelago, and is approximately 50 km (31 mi) west of mainland British Columbia. It is the primary western terminus of Trans-Canada Highway 16 (the Yellowhead Highway) and is served by Masset Airport, with flights to Vancouver and Prince Rupert. During the maritime fur trade of the early 19th century, Masset was a key trading site. It was incorporated as a village municipality on May 11, 1961.

== Name ==
The name Masset was a gift from the captain of a Spanish vessel that was repaired with the assistance of the Haida citizens of Atewaas, Kayung, and Jaaguhl. These three villages accepted the gift and adopted the name Masset to commemorate what might be the first ever contact between Europeans and the Haida. Masset came from the Haida word masst, or "large island".

During the early years of Canadian colonization the name Masset and the post office were adopted by the (former) Reverend Charles Harrison as tactic for his land-selling scheme.

Currently, the name Masset is in use by two places: The Village of Masset – a municipality under Canadian legislation – and by the village of Old Massett, the original recipient of the name and a village under the Constitution of the Haida Nation. Masset's name in the local dialect of the Haida language is Uttewas, "white slope", probably referring to a small hill south of the village.

According to Walbran (1971), Captain Douglas, on his second visit from Nootka Sound aboard the Iphigenia on 19 June 1789, named the bay leading to the inlet McIntyre's Bay. This name was used on the charts of Dixon and Meares. The American traders called the inlet, Hancock's River as shown in Ingraham's chart of 1792 after the American brig Hancock. In 1853 H.N. Knox of the Royal Navy, mate on HMS Virago, made a survey sketch of the harbour when the name Masset was adopted by the British. A survey was made in 1907 by Captain Learmouth on HMS Egeria.

== Demographics ==
In the 2021 Census of Population conducted by Statistics Canada, Masset had a population of 838 living in 399 of its 518 total private dwellings, a change of 5.7% from its 2016 population of 793. With a land area of 20.69 km^{2} (7.99 sq mi), it had a population density of 40.5/km^{2} (104.9/sq mi) in 2021.

== Oceanographic research ==
From 1942 to 1942, the British Columbia Shore Station Oceanographic Program was collecting coastal water temperature and salinity measurements for the Department of Fisheries and Oceans from Masset everyday during this period.

== Military base ==
Canadian Forces Station Leitrim Detachment Masset, established as Naval Radio Station Masset in 1943, is a Canadian Forces facility used to gather signals intelligence for the Communications Security Establishment Canada and the Canadian Forces Intelligence Branch. The equipment at CFS Masset is operated remotely from CFS Leitrim near Ottawa, Ontario.

== Climate ==
The climate, moderated by a warm Pacific current from Japan, is generally mild with no extremes in temperature, oceanic (Cfb). Annual temperature varies only 20 degrees Celsius but is variable and unpredictable - even within a 24-hour period. Average rainfall is 1,337.4 mm (52.65 in) with snowfall of 75.3 cm (29.65 in) and there is generally a breeze, most often out of the southeast when it is raining, and the northwest when it is sunny.

Summer temperatures are in the 15 to 20 °C (59 to 68 °F) range and the days are long - May, June, July boasting 18 hours of daylight. August and May general have the most sun but there is a fair degree of rain throughout the summer months. Winter months are mild with temperatures in the 0–8 °C (32–46 °F) range and while precipitation is usually in the form of rain there can be some snowfall. Conditions can become severe without warning and Masset has registered wind gusts to 160 km/h (99 mph).

Although it is located at over 54 degrees north, rainfall follows a Mediterranean pattern. It is one of the northernmost places with this characteristic.

Climate data for Masset
Month	Jan	Feb	Mar	Apr	May	Jun	Jul	Aug	Sep	Oct	Nov	Dec	Year
Record high °C (°F)	15.6 (60.1)	14.4 (57.9)	17.8 (64.0)	22.2 (72.0)	25.0 (77.0)	27.2 (81.0)	28.3 (82.9)	28.9 (84.0)	23.9 (75.0)	21.7 (71.1)	18.9 (66.0)	15.6 (60.1)	28.9 (84.0)
Mean daily maximum °C (°F)	5.1 (41.2)	6.0 (42.8)	7.2 (45.0)	9.6 (49.3)	12.7 (54.9)	15.3 (59.5)	17.3 (63.1)	18.2 (64.8)	16.1 (61.0)	12.2 (54.0)	8.2 (46.8)	5.9 (42.6)	11.1 (52.0)
Daily mean °C (°F)	2.4 (36.3)	3.0 (37.4)	3.8 (38.8)	5.8 (42.4)	8.7 (47.7)	11.5 (52.7)	13.7 (56.7)	14.3 (57.7)	12.1 (53.8)	8.5 (47.3)	5.1 (41.2)	3.5 (38.3)	7.8 (46.0)
Mean daily minimum °C (°F)	−2.2 (28.0)	−0.4 (31.3)	0.6 (33.1)	2.1 (35.8)	4.6 (40.3)	7.6 (45.7)	9.9 (49.8)	10.5 (50.9)	8.0 (46.4)	4.8 (40.6)	2.0 (35.6)	0.6 (33.1)	4.8 (40.6)
Record low °C (°F)	−18.9 (−2.0)	−14.4 (6.1)	−12.8 (9.0)	−7.8 (18.0)	−2.8 (27.0)	0.0 (32.0)	1.7 (35.1)	1.7 (35.1)	−2.8 (27.0)	−8.3 (17.1)	−11.1 (12.0)	−13.3 (8.1)	−18.9 (−2.0)
Average precipitation mm (inches)	143.3 (5.64)	111.9 (4.41)	110.9 (4.37)	100.9 (3.97)	80.7 (3.18)	65.8 (2.59)	69.7 (2.74)	72.0 (2.83)	112.1 (4.41)	186.4 (7.34)	181.4 (7.14)	176.9 (6.96)	1,412 (55.59)
Source: Environment Canada

== See also ==
- Masset Formation
- List of Haida villages
