= Graham Island =

Island in Canada

Native name: X̱aaydag̱a Gwaay.yaay linag̱waay
- Location in British Columbia Location in Canada
- Interactive map of Graham Island

Geography
- Location: Pacific Ocean
- Archipelago: Haida Gwaii
- Area: 6,552.25 km^{2} (2,529.84 sq mi) (2026)
- Area rank: 22nd in Canada & 100th worldwide
- Highest elevation: 1,119 m (3671 ft)
- Highest point: TlldaGaaw Jii.ngasii (Mt La Perouse)

Administration
- Canada
- Province: British Columbia
- Regional district: North Coast Regional District
- Largest settlement: Daajing Giids (pop. 852)

Demographics
- Population: 3,858 (2016)
- Pop. density: 0.61/km^{2} (1.58/sq mi)
- Ethnic groups: Haida people

Graham Island (Haida: X̱aaydag̱a Gwaay.yaay linag̱waay) is the largest island in the Haida Gwaii archipelago, lying off the mainland coast of British Columbia, Canada. It is separated by the narrow Skidegate Channel from the other principal island of the group to the south, Moresby Island (Haida: T'aaxwii X̱aaydag̱a Gwaay.yaay linag̱waay). It has a population of 3,858 (2016 census), an area of 6,552.25 km^{2} (2,529.84 sq mi), and is the 100th largest island in the world and Canada's 22nd largest island. Graham Island was named in 1853 by James Charles Prevost, commander of HMS Virago, for Sir James Graham, 2nd Baronet, who was First Lord of the Admiralty at the time.

== Communities ==
- Daajing Giids (formerly known as Queen Charlotte City)
- Juskatla
- Masset
- Old Massett
- Port Clements
- Skidegate
- Tlell

== Attractions ==
- Naikoon Provincial Park
- North Beach
- Kano Inlet

== See also ==
- List of islands of British Columbia
