= Tanu, Canada =

Tanu
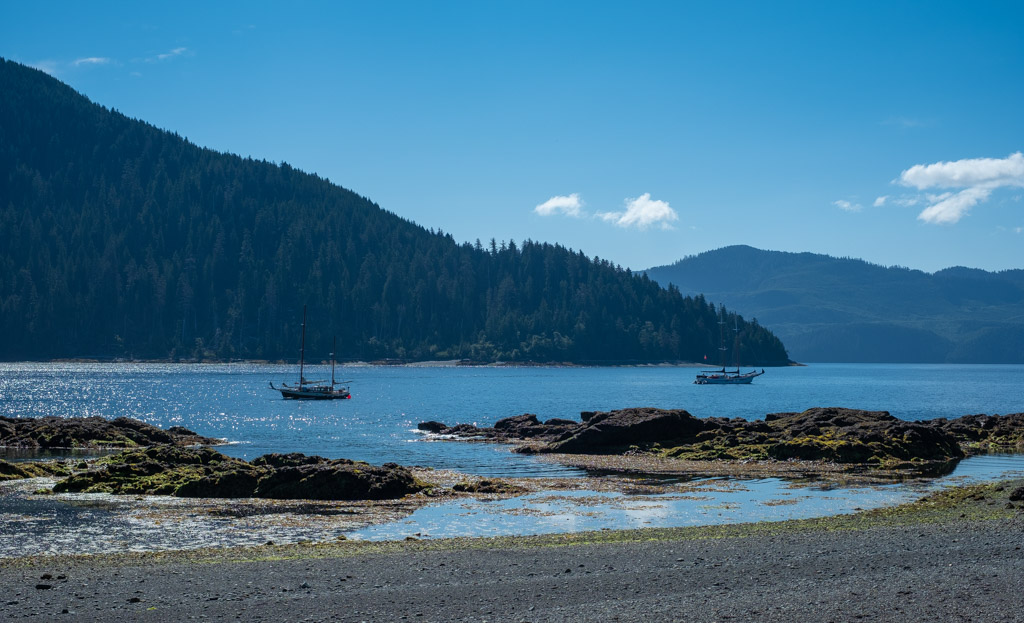
- Interactive map of Tanu
- 52.766634°N 131.616554°W
- Location: Haida Gwaii, British Columbia, Canada

Site notes
- Governing body: Council of the Haida Nation Parks Canada

National Historic Site of Canada
- Official name: Tanu National Historic Site of Canada
- Designated: 1987

Tanu (Haida: T'aanuu llnagaay) is a traditional Haida village site located on Tanu Island, Haida Gwaii, opposite of Kung'a Island in Laskeek Bay, within the Gwaii Haanas National Park Reserve and Haida Heritage Site in British Columbia, Canada. It is designated as a National Historic Site of Canada.

== Name ==
The anglicized name Tanu (anachronistically spelled Tanoo) derives from the Haida (X̱aayda Kil) word t'aanuu, meaning eel grass – referring to the abundant sea grass found at the mouth of the village. Historically, European newcomers commonly referred to the village as “Klue’s Village” (alternatively spelled Kloo, Clue, or Clew), referring to the original town chief, Xe-u (meaning 'Southeast Wind').

Note that the village New Clew (K’aadas Guu Gandlaay) at Church Creek in the Cumshewa Inlet on Moresby Island is often mistaken for the village of Tanu.

== History ==
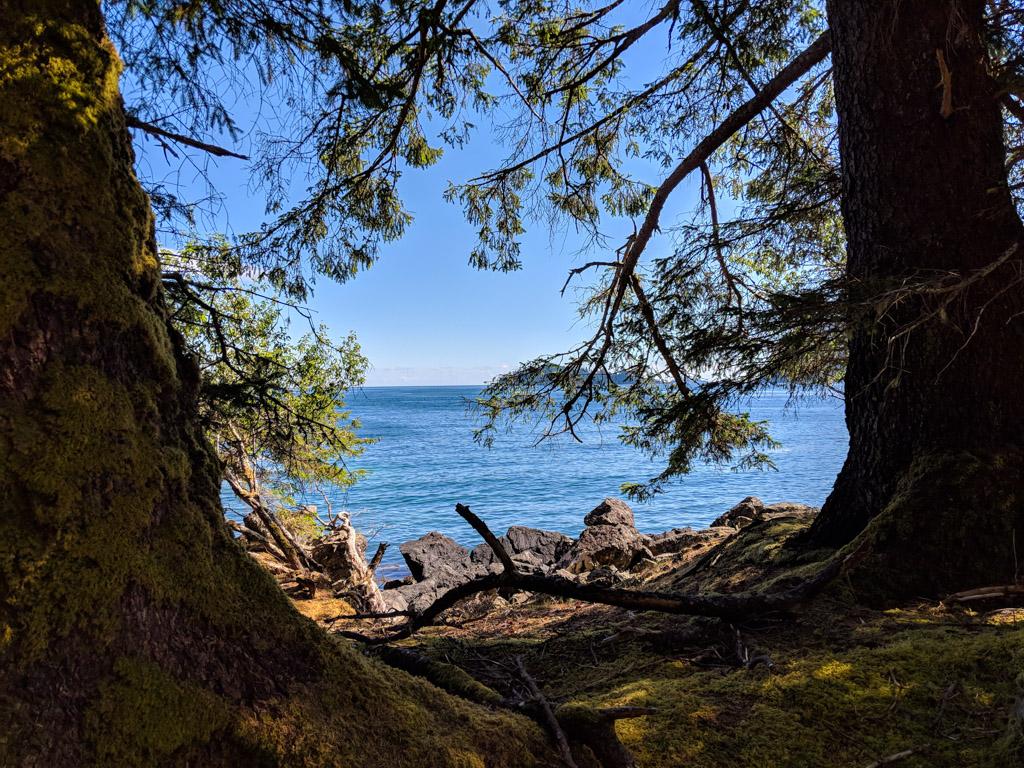
Beach and trees at Tanu, Haida Gwaii

According to George F. MacDonald, basing his estimation off of the accounts given by informants to John R. Swanton during the 1900-1901 Jesup Expedition, the town of Tanu likely did not exist earlier than 1735, approximating that the town was in existence for 110 to 165 years before the time of the village's final resident town chief, G̲itkun John Williams, at the turn of the 20th century.

The first settlers at Tanu arrived from Cumshewa Inlet, of the two closely aligned Eagle lineages, Those-Born-at-Skedans (K’uuna) and the Djigua-Town-People – among the most powerful Eagle families on the islands at the time. The first town chief of Tanu, Xe-u, was a member of the former.

The village was recorded to have a population of 545 inhabitants at around 1840 by John Work of the Hudson's Bay Company, making it one of the largest in the archipelago. Following multiple waves of epidemics (most notably the 1862 Pacific Northwest smallpox epidemic), the population had been reduced to only 150 inhabitants by 1884, and fell further to 80 individuals by 1887. The decision to relocate was made that year, with the surviving population moving north and establishing the village of New Clew, near the ancestral ‘old story town’ of Djigua. The new village was occupied until 1897; the residents then followed the island-wide consolidation of the Haida people to Graham Island, and settled at the southern town of Skidegate.

Visiting the village in 1883, James G. Swan recorded that there were thirty-one mortuary poles and fifteen mortuary houses, far outnumbering the remaining frontal house poles and longhouses. MacDonald speculates that soon before the relocation to New Clew, the mortuary remains of more than fifty individuals were interred in a mass gravesite at the prompting of Christian missionaries.

== Village site ==
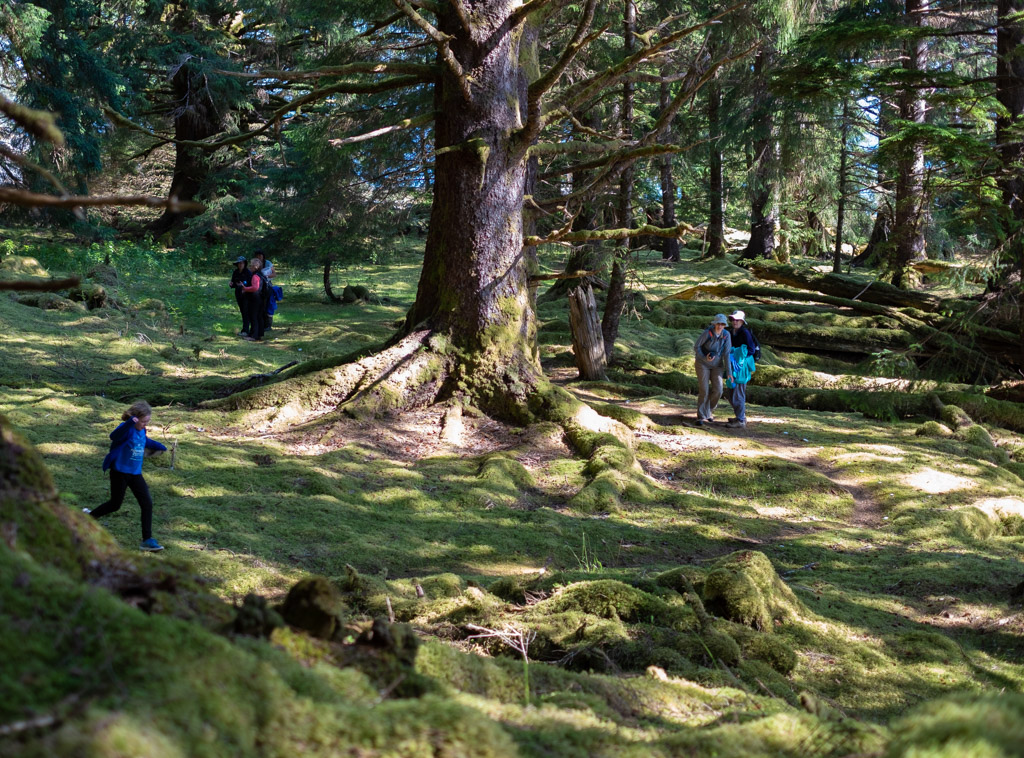
The village site at Tanu, Haida Gwaii.

Tanu is designated as a Haida Heritage Site by Parks Canada and the Council of the Haida Nation, and the site is co-managed by the joint venture of Gwaii Haanas National Park Reserve and Haida Heritage Site, though it is not included as part of the park reserve due to its zoning within Tanoo Indian Reserve No. 9.

The site today retains three visible house-pits and a number of house-beams along the forest undergrowth, along with a number of monumental poles in various stages of decomposition. It is among the sites covered by the Haida Gwaii Watchmen Program, and has a resident Watchman on-site between May and October each year to welcome visitors and provide information of its history.

Two ancestral frontal poles of the village were removed in the 1930s by B.C. Packers, and moved to Prince Rupert to be displayed in a local park. In response to worsening conditions of the poles, they were relocated in 1965 to the Royal British Columbia Museum in Victoria (which, along with the Museum of Anthropology in Vancouver and the Canadian Museum of History in Gatineau, houses other poles that were taken from Tanu). In 1976, the two poles were among the first Haida cultural artifacts to be reclaimed in repatriation efforts led by the Ḵay Llnagaay Haida Heritage Centre, where they are currently housed in the Xaayda Sahlinda Naay (lit. ‘Saving Things House’).

The ashes of Iljuwas Bill Reid were buried in Tanu following his death in 1998, near the birthplace of his maternal grandmother, Josephine, of the Kaadaas gaah Kiiguwaay Wolf clan Raven moiety. His headstone joins others that have been placed there by descendants of Tanu chiefs living in Skidegate.
