= Chaatl =

Chaatl Ttsaa'ahl
- Historic Haida village
- Location of Chaatl in British Columbia
- Coordinates: 53°6′28″N 132°31′36″W
- Country: Canada
- Province: British Columbia
- Haida Nation: Haida Gwaii

Chaatl, also spelled Cha'atl, Tsaa'ahl, Tts’aa’ahl, and other variations, was a historic Haida village located on the shore of Chaatl Island, facing south across Buck Channel to the western side of northern Moresby Island, near the western end of Skidegate Channel, Haida Gwaii, British Columbia, Canada. Across Buck Channel from Chaatl was the long-abandoned village site of Niisii. There were close connections between Chaatl and the nearby village of Kaisun, about 10 km (6.2 mi) to the south in a straight line, or about 20 km (12 mi) by water.

Chaatl is within the Daawuuxusda Conservancy.

According to John R. Swanton, Chaatl is the village written as Kow-welth by John Work in his list and census of towns conducted around 1836–41. Work described Chaatl as having 35 houses and 561 inhabitants. The Haida told Swanton that there had been a great fire in Chaatl sometime after 1878, which destroyed a large part of the town. Evidence of 25 house sites were found during surveys done in 1968 and 1970, verified by photographs from about 1900.

== History ==
Chaatl was founded by families of the Raven and Eagle moieties from a long-abandoned village known as "Pebble Town", at Second Beach near Skidegate.

The head chief of Chaatl was a Raven whose chieftainship was accompanied by the traditional name Nankilstlas ("he whose voice is obeyed"). In the 1850s Chaatl had a prominent chief with the personal name Wadatstaia, known to outsiders as "Captain Gold", because he and his wife were the first to find gold in Haida Gwaii. Wadatstaia was the brother of "Chief Skotsgai" of Kaisun.

During the early maritime fur trade era, about 1787–1830, Chaatl was well-located for trading ship visits. In the 1830s the Hudson's Bay Company (HBC) took over the coast trade, which had previously been dominated by American ships from New England. The Americans abandoned the coast trade after sea otters had been extirated in the Pacific Northwest. When the HBC took over they focused the coast trade on Fort Simpson (today called Lax Kwʼalaams) on the mainland, not far from Prince Rupert. This change put Chaatl into decline as its location was non-ideal for the new trade network. However, the discovery of gold by Wadatstaia in 1849 caused a gold rush, which sustained Chaatl until the 1860s.

In the 1860s, during the Haida village abandonment and consolidation era that followed multiple epidemics, especially the 1862 Pacific Northwest smallpox epidemic, survivors in Chaatl moved to the eastern end of Skidegate Inlet, mostly to a new town on Maude Island (Haida: Xaayna Gwaay) established by refugees from Kaisun. The new village was named Haina (also spelled Xayna), sometimes called "New Gold Harbour". In the 1890s, after suffering further epidemics of smallpox, measles, and other diseases, the survivors in Haina moved to the new mission town of Skidegate, which had displaced the old Haida village of Hlghagilda.

Due to the very high death tolls during the epidemics of the late 1800s, Chaatl was essentially abandoned as a permanent settlement. But it was occupied seasonally for fishing and seal hunting, with four or five plank houses maintained, until after 1900.

Around 1900 Charles F. Newcombe took photographs of Chaatl, recorded oral histories, and collected many artifacts. The site was heavily overgrown at that time, with only a few houses still used. In 1912 Emily Carr made one of her most famous paintings of Haida scenes at Chaatl. The painting is titled "Haida Totems, Cha-atl, Queen Charlotte Islands". She made another painting of Chaatl titled "Ts'aa.ahl Llnagaay, Haida Gwaii".

== See also ==
- List of Haida villages
