= Skidegate Band Council =

- Band No. 670
- SG̱iidagiids G̱an ga Ḵaagangx̱aaw
- People: Haida
- Headquarters: Skidegate
- Province: British Columbia

Land
- Main reserve: Skidegate 1
- Reserves: List: Black Slate 11; Cumshewas 7; Deena 3; Kaste 6; Khrana 4; Lagins 5; New Clew 10; Skaigha 2; Skedance 8; Skidegate 1; Tanoo 9
- Land area: 8.4 km^{2} (3.2 sq mi)

Population (2025)
- On reserve: 650
- On other land: 29
- Off reserve: 1106
- Total population: 1785

Government
- Chief: William Yovanovich
- Council: 2023–25: Sidney G. Crosby; John Gladstone; Michelle McDonald; Gord Mills; Trent Moraes; Michelle Pineault; Susan Wood

Tribal Council
- Council of the Haida Nation

Website
- https://skidegate.ca/

Skidegate Band Council (SBC; Haida: SG̱iidagiids G̱an ga Ḵaagangx̱aaw), is a band government of the Haida people, located in Skidegate, on Haida Gwaii. Skidegate Band Council is one of two Canadian band governments for the Haida Nation, the other is Old Massett Village Council. The main governing body of the Haida people is the Council of the Haida Nation, and as such the two band councils function as village governments.

As of March 2025, the band has 1,788 registered members, and 11 reserves, with a total area of 841.8 hectares (2,080 acres).

== Reserves ==
Skidegate Band Council has 11 reserves, whose combined total area is 841.8 hectares (2,080 acres), with the main reserve being Skidegate. Reserves numbered 1-8 were allotted by reserve commissioner Peter O'Reilly in 1882, 9 and 10 were added in 1916 by Royal Commission, and 11 was purchased from the British Columbia government in 1941.

Reserve	Location	Area	Coordinates
Skidegate 1	At Skidegate Mission, mouth of Skidegate Inlet, southeast of Graham Island.	505.7 ha (1,250 acres)	53°15′57″N 131°59′57″W
Skaigha 2	East coast of Graham Island at Halibut Bay, 7 miles (11 km) north of Skidegate Mission.	25.1 ha (62 acres)	53°22′18″N 131°55′55″W
Deena 3	South shore of Skidegate Inlet on north side of South Bay, north end of Moresby Island.	48.2 ha (119 acres)	53°08′38″N 132°07′35″W
Khrana 4	East end of Maude Island, in Skidegate Inlet, between Graham and Moresby Islands	85 ha (210 acres)	53°12′50″N 132°02′24″W
Lagins 5	Mouth of Lagins Creek at head of Skidegate Inlet, on Graham Island.	16.2 ha (40 acres)	53°13′52″N 132°19′41″W
Kaste 6	At mouth of Copper Creek, on Copper bay, northeast coast of Moresby Island.	15.4 ha (38 acres)	53°09′35″N 131°47′21″W
Cumshewa 7	North shore of Cumshewa Inlet west of McCoy Cove, east side of Moresby Island	22.6 ha (56 acres)	53°02′49″N 131°41′07″W
Skedance 8	On east tip of Louise Island, near, but not at the site, of the village of Skedans.	68.4 ha (169 acres)	52°57′41″N 131°37′12″W
Tanoo 9	East shore of Tanoo Island	26.3 ha (65 acres)	52°45′46″N 131°37′19″W
New Clew 10	On north shore of Louise Island	11.2 ha (28 acres)	52°45′46″N 131°37′19″W
Black Slate 11	On Slatechuck Creek, about 2 miles (3.2 km) west of its mouth on Kagan Bay, Skidegate Inlet	17.7 ha (44 acres)	53°14′01″N 132°15′43″W
