= List of Haida villages =

This is a list of Haida villages, located in Haida Gwaii and Prince of Wales Island, Alaska. The following list includes material from John R. Swanton's The Indian Tribes of North America and the Canadian Museum of History. The Haida language names for places on Haida Gwaii are primarily derived from information published by the Council of the Haida Nation.

== Currently active ==
Kaigani (Alaska)

- Hydaburg, on the north shore of Sukkwan Strait, Prince of Wales Island.
- Kasaan, on Skowl Arm of Kasaan Bay, east coast of Prince of Wales Island.

Graham Island (Canada)

- Old Masset (Haida: G̱aw Tlagée), located at the mouth of Masset Inlet on the north coast of Graham Island.
- Skidegate (Haida: HlG̱aagilda Llnagaay), on the north shore of Skidegate Inlet near its entrance, on the southeast coast of Graham Island.

== Historical villages and towns ==
- Chaatl (Haida: Ts'aahl), at the western entrance to Skidegate Inlet.
- Cape Ball (Haida: G̱aahllns Kun), on the east coast of Graham Island, north of Cape Ball River, part of Naikoon Provincial Park.
- Cumshewa (Haida: Hlḵinul Llnagaay), at the north entrance of Cumshewa Inlet, Moresby Island.
- Dadens (Haida: Dáadans), on the south coast of Langara Island, fronting Parry Passage.
- Haina (Haida: Xaayna Llnagaay), on the east end of Maude Island, Skidegate Inlet.
- Hiellen (Haida: Hl'yaalan 'Llngée), on the right bank of the Hiellen River, at its mouth, Graham Island.
- Howkan, on Long Island, Alaska, facing Dall Island, at Mission Cove.
- Kaisun (Haida: Ḵaysuun), on the northwest coast of Moresby Island.
- Kayung (Haida: Ḵ'aayang), on the east side of Masset Inlet, now part of Old Massett.
- Kiusta (Haida: K'yúusda 'Lngée), on the northwest coast of Graham Island, opposite Langara Island.
- Klinkwan (Haida: Hlankwa’án), on Cordova Bay, Prince of Wales Island, Alaska.
- Kung (Haida: Kang 'Llngée), at the mouth of Naden Harbor, Graham Island.
- Kweundlas (Haida: K’wíi Gándlaas), on the west coast of Long Island, Alaska.
- Naikun (Haida: Née Kun, lit. 'House Point'), on the northeast coast of Graham Island, now part of Naikoon Provincial Park.
- Ninstints (Haida: SG̱ang Gwaay Llnagaay), on Anthony Island, part of Gwaii Haanas National Park Reserve, and a UNESCO World Heritage Site.
- Skedans (Haida: Ḵ'uuna Llnagaay, lit. 'Village on the Edge' or Haida: Xuuajii Llnagaay, lit. 'Grizzly Bear Village'), on a point of land which extends into Hecate Strait from the east end of Louise Island.
- Sukkwan, on Cordova Bay, Prince of Wales Island, Alaska.
- Tanu (Haida: T’aanuu Llnagaay), Louise Island.
- Tian (Haida: Tii.aan), on the west coast of Graham Island south of Point Lewis.
- Tlell (Haida: Tllaal), on the east coast of Graham Island.
- Yaku (Haida: Yaak'u), on the northwest coast of Graham Island opposite Langara Island.
- Yan (Haida: Yáan 'Llngée), on the west side of Masset Inlet near its mouth.

=== Small towns and camps ===
- Aiodjus on the west side of Masset Inlet at its mouth.
- Atana, on House or Atana Island off the east coast of Moresby Island.
- Atanus, on the northeast coast of Hippa Island.
- Chaahl, on the east coast of Langara Island.
- Chatchini, near Kasaan, Prince of Wales Island.
- Chets, on an island at the mouth of Tsooskahli, Masset Inlet.
- Chuga, near Houston Stewart Channel and the town of Ninstints.
- Chukeu, on the southwest coast of Moresby Island.
- Dadjingits, on the north shore of Bearskin Bay, Skidegate Inlet.
- Dahua, north of Lawn Hill at the mouth of Skidegate Inlet.
- Daiyu, on Shingle Bay, east of Welcome Point, Moresby Island.
- Djigogiga, legendary town on Copper Bay, Moresby Island.
- Djigua, legendary town on the north shore of Cumshewa Inlet.
- Djihuagits, on a creek just south of Rose Spit, Graham Island.
- Edjao, around Edjao Hill at the east end of Masset Village.
- Gachigundae, on the northeast shore of Alliford Bay, Moresby Island.
- Gado, two towns:
  - (1) traditional, on the south side of De la Beche Inlet, Moresby Island;
  - (2), on the east side of Lyell Island.
- Gaedi, on the northeast shore of a small inlet just northeast of Houston Inlet.
- Gaesigusket, on Murchison Island at a point opposite Hot Springs Island.
- Gaiagunkun, legendary, near Hot Springs Island.
- Gaodjaos, on the south shore of Lina Island, Bearskin Bay.
- Gasins, on the northwest shore of Lina Island, Bearskin Bay.
- Gatgainans, on Hippa Island.
- Gitinkalana, on the north shore of Masset Inlet where it expands into the inner bay.
- Guhlga, legendary, on the north shore of Skidegate Inlet one mile above Skidgate Village.
- Gulhlgildjing, on the south shore of Alliford Bay, Moresby Island.
- Gwaeskun, at Gwaeskun, the northernmost point on the Queen Charlotte Islands.
- Hagi, on or near the largest of the Bolkus Islands.
- Heudao, on the east side of Gull Point, Prevost Island.
- Hlagi, on an island near the east end of Houston Stewart Channel.
- Hlakeguns, on Yagun River at the Head of Masset Inlet.
- Hlgadun, on Moresby Island facing Anthony Island.
- Hlgaedlin, on the south side of Tanoo Island.
- Hlgahet, near Skidegate.
- Hlgai, at the head of Skedans Bay.
- Hlgaiha, north of Dead Tree Point at the entrance of Skidegate Inlet.
- Hlgaiu, south of Dead Tree Point at the entrance of Skidegate Inlet.
- Hlgihla-ala, north of Cape Ball, on the east shore of Graham Island.
- Hlk'yah GaawGa (Hlkia in Swanton, Windy Bay), on the outer side of Lyell Island
- Hluln, in Naden Harbor.
- Hotao, legendary, on the southwest coast of Maude Island.
- Hotdjohoas, on Lyell Island near the north end of Darwin Sound.
- Hoyagundla, on a stream of the same name a short distance south of Cape Fife.
- Huados, near Hlgihla-ala, north of Cape Ball.
- Kadadjans, on the northwest end of Anthony Island.
- Kadusgo, at the mouth of a creek of the same name on Louise Island, flowing into Cumshewa Inlet from the south.
- Kae, on Skotsgai Bay above Skidegate.
- Kaidju, on Hewlett Bay, east coast of Moresby Island.
- Kaidjudal, on Moresby Island opposite Hot Springs Island.
- Kaigani, at the southeast end of Dall Island, Alaska.
- Kaisun (Haida: Ḵaysuun Llnagaay)
- Kasta, legendary, on Copper Bay, Moresby Island.
- Katana, on Louise Island.
- Kesa, on the west coast of Graham Island.
- Ket, on Burnaby Strait, Moresby Island.
- Kil, on Shingle Bay, Skidegate Inlet.
- Koagoagit, on the north shore of Bearskin Bay.
- Koga, on McKay Harbour, Cumshewa Inlet.
- Kogalskun, on Masset Inlet.
- Kostunhana, a short distance east of Skidegate.
- Kundji, 2 towns:
  - (1) legendary, on the south shore of Copper Bay, Moresby Island;
  - (2), on the west side of Prevost Island.
- Kung
- Kungga, on the south shore of Dog Island.
- Kungielung, on the west side of the entrance to Masset Inlet.
- Kunhalas, just inside of Cumshewa Inlet.
- Kunkia, on the north coast of North Island.
- Kuulana, in Naden Harbor.
- Lanadagunga, south of Tangle Cove, Moresby Island.
- Lanagahlkehoda, on a small island opposite, Kaisun, Moresby Island.
- Lanahawa, 2 towns:
  - (1) on the west coast of Graham Island opposite Hippa Island;
  - (2) on the west coast of Burnaby Island south of Ket.
- Lanahilduns, on the southwest side of Rennell Sound, Graham Island.
- Lanaslnagai, 3 towns:
  - (1) on the east coast of Graham Island south of Cape Ball,
  - (2) on the west side of Masset Inlet where the inner expansion begins;
  - (3) on Yagun River.
- Lanaungsuls, on Masset Inlet.
- Nagus, in an inlet on the southwest coast of Moresby Island.
- Sahldungkun, on the west side of the Yakoun River (Yagun River in Swanton) at its mouth.
- Sakaedigialas, traditional, on or near Kuper Island.
- Sgilgi, in an inlet on the southwest coast of Moresby Island.
- Sindaskun, near the south end of the islands.
- Sindatahls, near Tsoo-skahli, an inner expansion of Masset Inlet.
- Singa, on the north side of Tasoo Harbour, west coast of Moresby Island.
- Skae, close to Cape St. James at the south end of the Queen Charlotte Islands.
- Skaito, on the west coast of Moresby Island near Gold Harbour.
- Skaos, at the entrance of Naden Harbor.
- Skena, legendary, just south of Sand Spit Point, Moresby Island.
- Skudus, on the north side of Lyell Island.
- Stlindagwai, in an inlet on the west coast of Moresby Island.
- Stunhlai, on the northwest coast of Moresby Island.
- Sulustins, on the east coast of Hippa Island.
- Ta, on the east coast of Langara Island.
- Te, on the west coast of Graham Island opposite Frederick Island.
- Tlgunghung, on the north side of Lyell Island.
- Tlhingus, on Louise Island.
- Tohlka, on the north coast of Graham Island just west of the entrance to Masset Inlet.
- Widja, on the north coast of Graham Island just west of the entrance of Masset Inlet.
- Yagun, on the north coast of Graham Island.
- Yaogus, on the southwest side of Louise Island.
- Yastling, in Naden Harbor, Graham Island.
- Yatze, on the north coast of Graham Island between North Island and Virago Sound.
- Youahnoe, given as a Kaigani town, perhaps identical with the town of Kaigani.
