= Kaisun (Haida village) =

Kaisun Qaysun
- Historic Haida village
- Location of Kaisun in British Columbia
- Coordinates: 53°01′58″N 132°27′06″W
- Country: Canada
- Province: British Columbia
- Haida Nation: Haida Gwaii

Kaisun, also Ḵaysuun, Qaysun, Qaysun Llanagaay, or Sealion Town, is a former village of the Haida people located on the west side of Moresby Island in Haida Gwaii of the North Coast of British Columbia, Canada. The Haida of Kaisun were Qayahl Llaanas, the Sealion People, of the Eagle moiety. It was normal for members of both Haida moieties to live in a village. In Kaisun, houses of the Raven moiety were on the west side of the village, while Eagle houses were on the east side. There were close connections between Kaisun and the nearby village of Chaatl, about 10 km (6.2 mi) to the north in a straight line, or about 20 km (12 mi) by water.

Today Kaisun is part of the Daawuuxusda Conservancy.

== History ==
During the early maritime fur trade era British and American traders called the village and its nearby waters by various names, including "Scots Guy", "Skotsgai", "Scotsi", and "Scots Guy's Cove". These names and similar variants derive from Sqaatsigaay ("Bravery Itself"), also called Nañ na’gage skilxa’ogas, one of the headmen of the Qayahl Llaanas who lived in Kaisun. He was frequently referred to as "Chief Skotsgai" by Westerners during the early contact period. The Haida of Kaisun learned that "Scots Guy" or "Skotsgai" was a useful name to use when interacting with visiting traders. Later traders and visitors sometimes called the village Kaisun, often in various spellings such as Kai-shun. The Hudson's Bay Company trader John Work called the village Kish-a-win.

The name "Gold Harbour", sometimes "Old Gold Harbour", was used after gold was found nearby in the mid-19th century. The current location of Gold Harbour is about 20 km (12 mi) southeast of Kaisun.

Around 1875, during the Haida village abandonment and consolidation era that followed the 1862 Pacific Northwest smallpox epidemic, the survivors in Kaisun and Chaatl moved to a new village on Maude Island (Haida: Xaayna Gwaay) in Skidegate Inlet. The new village was named Haina (also spelled Xayna), sometimes called "New Gold Harbour". In the 1890s, after suffering further epidemics of smallpox, measles, and other diseases, the survivors in Haina moved to the new mission town of Skidegate, which had displaced the old Haida village of Hlghagilda.

== See also ==
- List of Haida villages
