= Haina (Haida village) =

Coordinates: 53°12′43″N 132°02′9″W

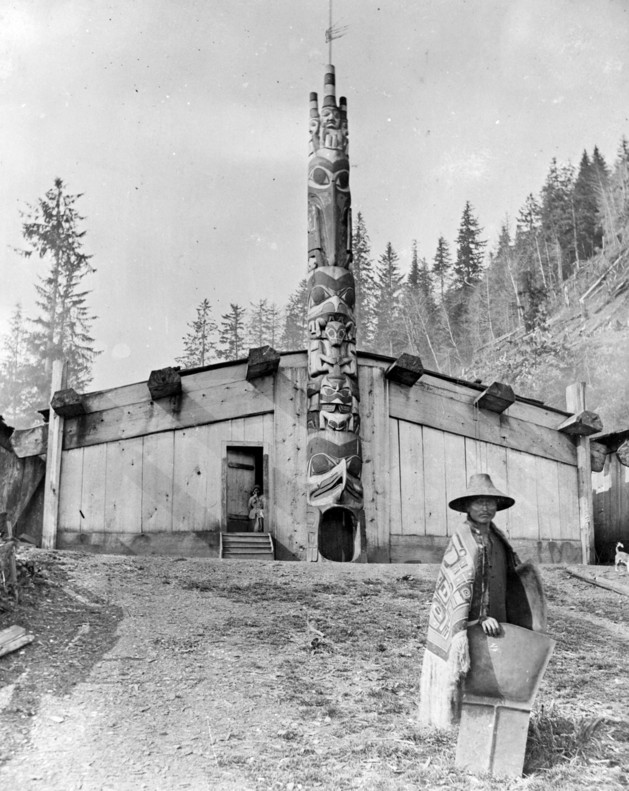
"House Where People Always Want to Go," Haina village, 1888

Haina (Haida: Xaayna Llnagaay, lit. 'Sunshine Village') was a Haida village located on the east side of Maude Island (Haida: Xaayna Gwaay) in Skidegate Inlet, Haida Gwaii. Today the village site is in the Indian Reserve known as Khrana 4.

Haina was founded around 1875 by refugees from Kaisun (also spelled Qaysun), during the Haida village abandonment and consolidation that occurred in the wake of multiple epidemics, especially the 1862 Pacific Northwest smallpox epidemic, which alone killed over 50%, in some areas up to 90%, of the Haida people. Although the village of Haina was new, it was built on an old site known as Xayna or Haina. The village was sometimes called "New Gold Harbour", since Kaisun was sometimes called "Gold Harbour" or "Old Gold Harbour" after a small gold rush occurred nearby in 1852. In the 1890s, after suffering further epidemics of smallpox, measles, and other diseases, the survivors in Haina moved to the new mission town of Skidegate, which had displaced the old Haida village of HlG̲aagilda.

== See also ==
- List of Haida villages
