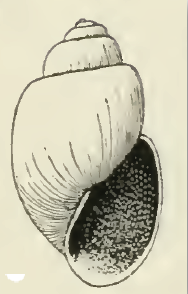
- Apertural view of Odostomia cassandra

Scientific classification
- Kingdom: Animalia
- Phylum: Mollusca
- Class: Gastropoda
- Family: Pyramidellidae
- Genus: Odostomia
- Species: O. cassandra

Binomial name
- Odostomia cassandra Bartsch, 1912

Synonyms
- Odostomia (Evalea) cassandra Bartsch, 1912

= Odostomia cassandra =

Species of gastropod

Odostomia cassandra is a species of sea snail, a marine gastropod mollusc in the family Pyramidellidae, the pyrams and their allies.

== Description ==
The small shell measures 2.5 mm. It is, ovate, very thin, semitransparent, light yellow. The nuclear whorls are deeply immersed in the first of the succeeding turns. The four post-nuclear whorls are very strongly, tabulatedly shouldered at the summit, moderately rounded. They are marked by fine incremental Iines, and numerous exceedingly closely spaced, very fine, spiral striations. The sutures are strongly constricted. The periphery of the body whorl is well-rounded. The base of the shell is rather long, well-rounded. The aperture is very large and broadly oval. The posterior angle is decidedly obtuse. The outer lip is very thin. The inner lip is very slender, very oblique, somewhat sinuous, strongly curved, and slightly reflected over the base, but not appressed to it. It is provided with a weak fold some little distance anterior to its insertion.

== Distribution ==
This species occurs in the Pacific Ocean off Skidegate, British Columbia.
