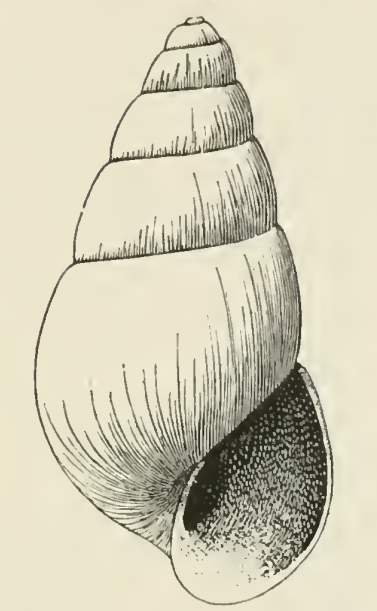
- Apertural view of Odostomia hypatia

Scientific classification
- Kingdom: Animalia
- Phylum: Mollusca
- Class: Gastropoda
- Family: Pyramidellidae
- Genus: Odostomia
- Species: O. hypatia

Binomial name
- Odostomia hypatia Dall & Bartsch, 1912

Synonyms
- Odostomia (Evalea) hypatia Dall & Bartsch, 1912

= Odostomia hypatia =

Species of gastropod

Odostomia hypatia is a species of sea snail, a marine gastropod mollusc in the family Pyramidellidae, the pyrams and their allies.

== Description ==
The shell is large and measures 5.2 mm. It is elongate-ovate, strongly umbilicated, yellowish-white. The nuclear whorls are deeply immersed in the first of the succeeding turns, above which the tilted edge of the last volution only projects. The six post-nuclear whorls are well rounded, and feebly shouldered at the summit. They are marked by fine incremental lines, and numerous exceedingly fine, closely spaced, spiral striations. The sutures are moderately constricted. The periphery of the body whorl is inflated, well rounded. The base of the shell is moderately long, well rounded, openly umbilicated. The aperture is oval, effuse anteriorly. The posterior angle is obtuse; The outer lip is thin. The inner lip is very oblique, slender, curved, and decidedly reflected, but not appressed to the base. The columella is provided with a moderately strong fold a little anterior to its insertion. The parietal wall is glazed with a thin callus.

== Distribution ==
The type specimen was found in the Pacific Ocean off Skidegate, British Columbia
