= Haida Heritage Centre =

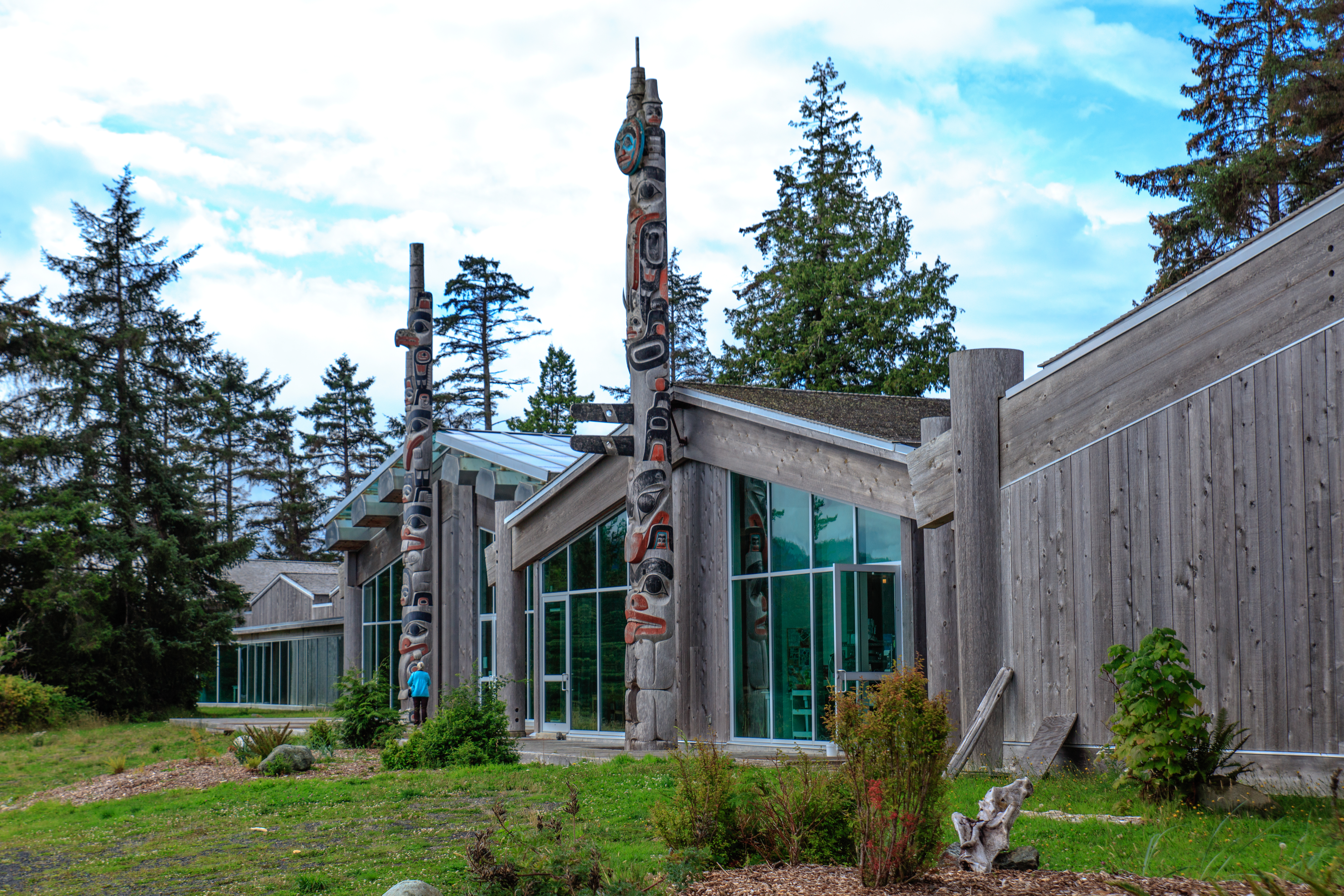
- Haida Heritage Centre at Kay Llnagaay

- Location within British Columbia

General information
- Location: Second Beach Road, Skidegate, British Columbia, Canada
- Coordinates: 53.2481°N 131.9998°W
- Completed: July 1, 2007 (soft opening)
- Opening: August 23, 2008
- Cost: $19.2 million (total projected cost)

Technical details
- Floor area: 4,800 m^{2} (52,000 sq ft)

Design and construction
- Architects: David Nairne & Associates Ltd.

Website
- www.haidaheritagecentre.com

The Haida Heritage Centre is the premier cultural centre and museum of the Haida people. It is located in Skidegate, a community on Graham Island in Haida Gwaii off the Pacific coast of British Columbia, Canada. The centre is situated just south of the site of a historical village in Kay Llnagaay (pronounced kie-il-na-guy, which means "Town of Sea Lions"). The Centre was built and is managed by Gwaalagaa Naay, an economic development branch of the Skidegate Band Council, the owners of the site. It is one of the major aboriginal cultural tourism attractions in Haida Gwaii and has been described as "a place for the Haida voice to be heard." Educational programs are offered in partnership with School District 50 Haida Gwaii, the University of Northern British Columbia, and with the Haida Gwaii Higher Education Society.

The Centre includes an interpretive centre, temporary exhibit space, Performing House, Canoe house, Carving Shed, the Bill Reid Teaching Centre, Program Management Centre, an expanded Haida Gwaii Museum, a gift shop and a small restaurant and cafe.

== History ==
Planning for the Heritage Centre began in the early-mid 1990s and in 1995, the Qay’llnagaay Heritage Centre Society was formed.

The facility was planned in partnership various entities, including the Heritage Centre Society, the Skidegate Band Council, and Parks Canada. Funding was provided by various sources: Parks Canada (in return for long-term office, classroom, lab, exhibit and interpretive space and a sharing of exhibits), Indian and Northern Affairs Canada, Department of Canadian Heritage, Gwaii Trust Fund, Haida Gwaii Museum Society, the Skidegate Band Council, and fundraising efforts (continuing as of 2013)

The project was targeted to be completed in mid-2005; actual completion and a "soft opening" to the public on July 1, 2007. The Grand Opening Ceremonies were held on August 23, 2008 and included the launching, naming, and traditional presenting of three canoes, the first canoes made in Skidegate since Bill Reid's Loo Taas in 1985. Both Loo Tas and Loo-plex joined the canoes coming in to land on the beach.

== Facilities and exhibits ==
The Centre was designed by architects David Nairne and Associates Ltd. to resemble a series of longhouses to evoke the feeling of a traditional Haida village. The facility comprises five contemporary monumental timber longhouses made of cedar and connected by an atrium.

The most visible elements of the facility are six Haida totem poles representing each of the six villages of Skidegate: Chaatl, Cumshewa, Skedans, SGang Gwaii, and Tanu. They were created respectively by Norman Price, Garner Moody, Guujaaw, Jim Hart, Tim Boyko and Giitsxaa. They were raised in 2001.

Principal spaces in the Centre include:

- Welcome House (or Stlaay Daw Naay)
- The Carving House (or Gyaa K'id Naay) - a large, open-walled building designed to house local artists working on monumental poles, canoes and other large work.
- The Canoe House (or Skaajang Naay) - exhibits on the Haida's historical mode of transportation, food and resource gathering, and trade. It houses noted Haida artist Bill Reid’s 50 ft cedar canoe Loo Taas, and its full scale fiberglass replica Loo-plex. Both canoes are used for ceremonies, weddings and the annual Skidegate Days canoe races. Ongoing projects undertaken in this space include paddle-making and bentwood box construction.
- Performance House (or Gina Guu Aahliuu Naay) - an amphitheater that can seat up to 250 people in a room designed like a traditional Haida style dugout longhouse.
- Bill Reid Teaching Centre (or Aahl Sgwaansing Naay) - studio and classrooms for Haida apprentices to learn their craft from Haida master carvers and designers, and for special training seminars and university-accredited courses in fine arts.

== Haida Gwaii Museum ==
The Queen Charlotte Islands Museum Society was established in 1973 to create a museum for the Islands. The museum opened in 1976 and conducts research on the Haida peoples and culture, as well as acquiring artifacts, archival records, and reference material relating to the Haida and to European settlement of the islands. The museum's collection includes artifacts and documents from 1890 to present, but predominantly between 1900 and 1990. The Museum was expanded when the Haida Heritage Centre was constructed and is now part of the Centre.

The museum uses a chronological layout for the galleries: pre-(European) contact ("In the Beginning"), post-contact ("Contact & Conflict"), to contemporary ("Our Way of Life"). Gallery exhibits showcase pieces of Haida history and contemporary life, and Haida art and culture (including button blankets, argillite carvings, and totem poles), natural history of the Islands, and the Gwaii Haanas National Park Reserve and Haida Heritage Site. An exhibitions gallery features art shows during the year. Prominently featured in the Museum are various totem poles, both contemporary and ones carved in the 19th Century. In August 2022, the Haida Gwaii Museum added priceless Haida Nation artifacts to its collection when the Buxton Museum and Art Gallery in the UK offered to repatriate items that it had long displayed. The artifacts include an argillite tray with an ivory inlay and an argillite sculpture.
