= Laskeek Bay =

- Location of Laskeek Bay
- Location: British Columbia, Canada
- Coordinates: 52°48′51″N 131°35′21″W
- Type: Bay
- Ocean/sea sources: Pacific Ocean

Laskeek Bay is a bay in Haida Gwaii, British Columbia, Canada. It is located on the east side of Moresby Island, north of Lyell Island, south of Louise Island, and east of Talunkwan Island.

Some of Laskeek Bay's shores are within Ḵ'uuna Gwaay Conservancy and Gwaii Haanas. Part of Laskeek Bay is within the Gwaii Haanas National Marine Conservation Area.

Laskeek Bay's name is said to be an adaptation of a Tsimshian word meaning "on the eagle", which was the Tsimshian name for the historic Haida village Tanu.
