= Skedans =

- Ḵ'uuna Llnagaay (Haida)
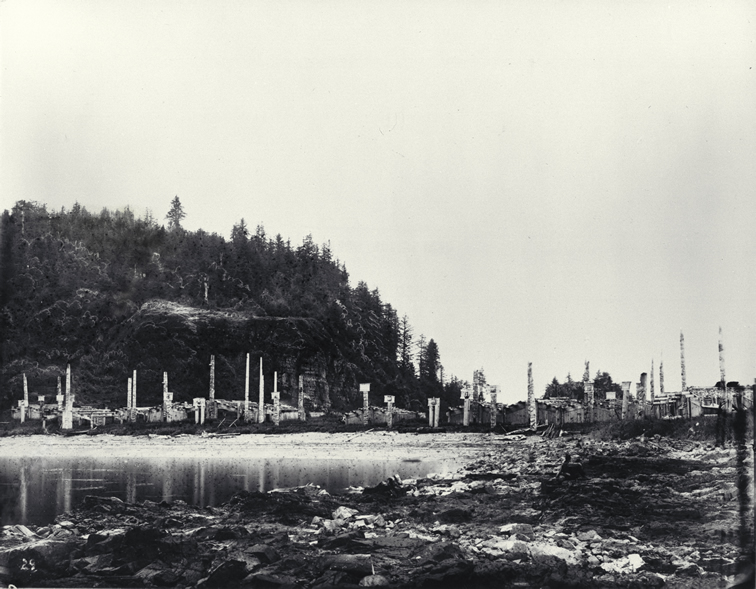
- Skedans village in 1878

- Location within British Columbia
- 52°57′51″N 131°36′28″W
- Type: Village
- Location: Louise Island, Haida Gwaii

Site notes
- Governing body: Council of the Haida Nation

National Historic Site of Canada
- Designated: 1987-03-30

Skedans (Haida: Ḵ'uuna Llnagaay, lit. 'Village on the Edge' or Haida: Xuuajii Llnagaay, lit. 'Grizzly Bear Village') is a historic Haida village located on Louise Island at the head of Cumshewa Inlet in Haida Gwaii, British Columbia, Canada.

The village is located within the K'uuna Gwaay Conservancy, administered by the Council of the Haida Nation, and is a National Historic Site of Canada.

== Names ==
The name Skedans is derived from the name of the village's reigning chief during the maritime fur trade, Gida'nsta, a Haida term of respect meaning "from his daughter."

The village was also known by two Haida names. The first, Ḵ'uuna Llnagaay meaning "Village at the Edge", refers to its geographical position on the edge of a small peninsula. The second, Xuuajii Llnagaay, meaning "Grizzly Bear Village", references the prominent depictions of grizzly bears on the totem poles and other artwork adorning the village.

== Gallery ==
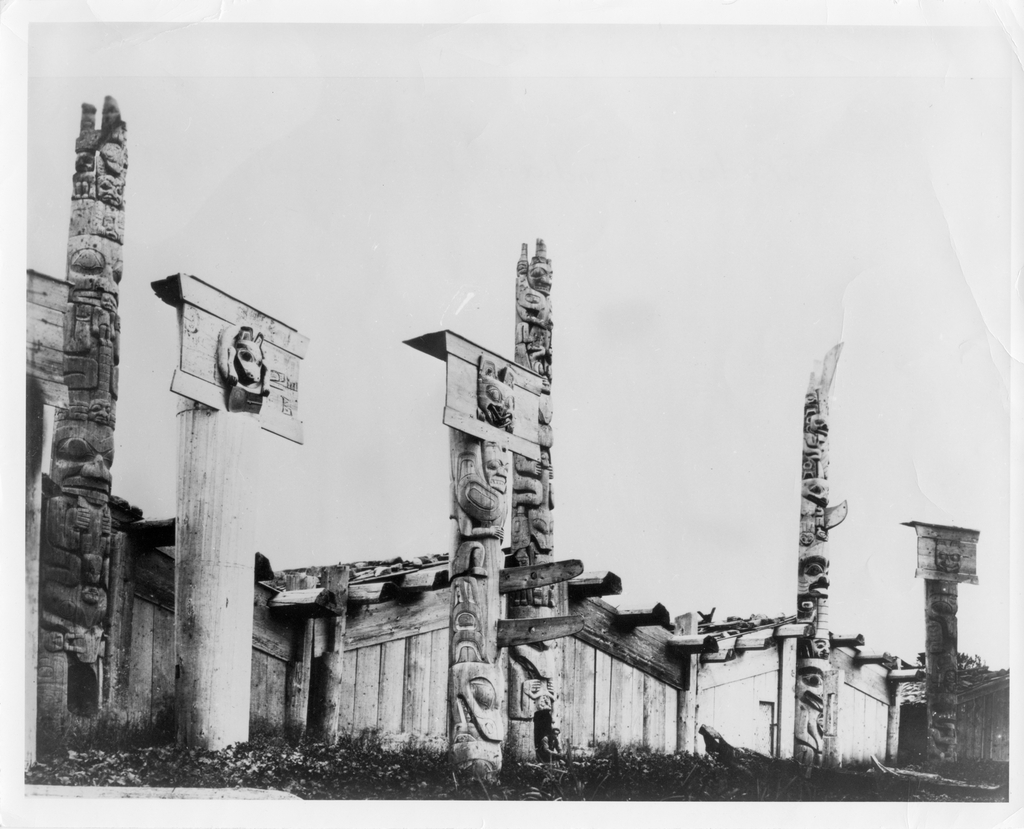
Skedans, 1878

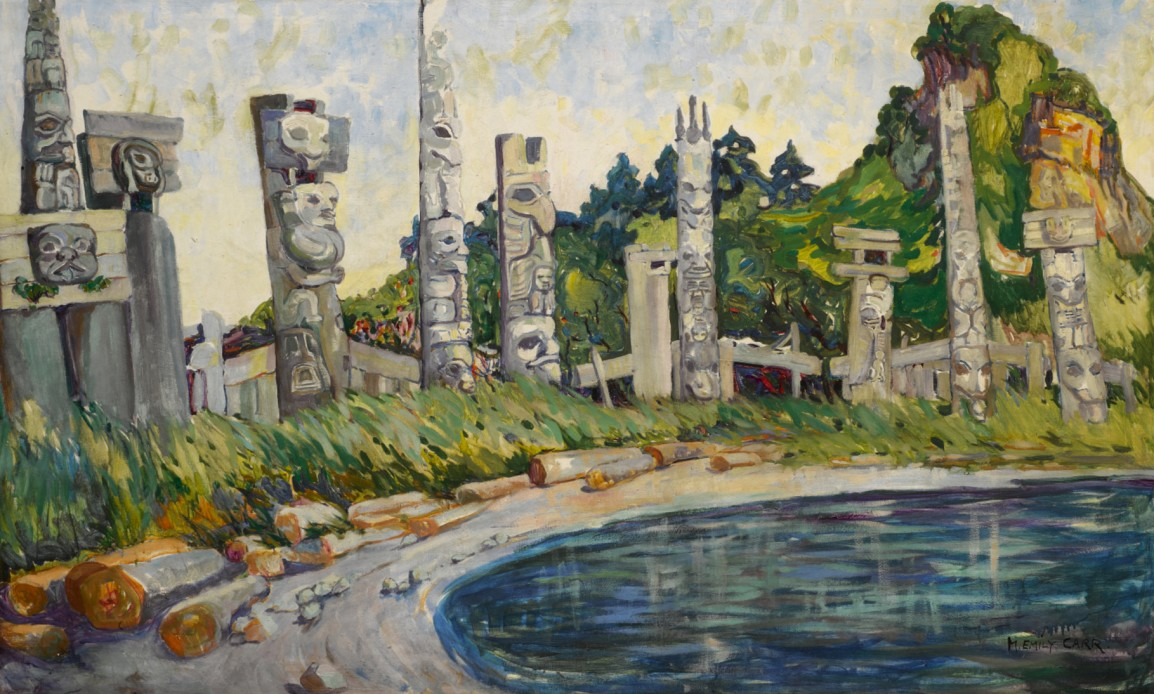
Painting of Skedans by Emily Carr, 1912

== See also ==
- List of Haida villages
