= Skidegate Channel =

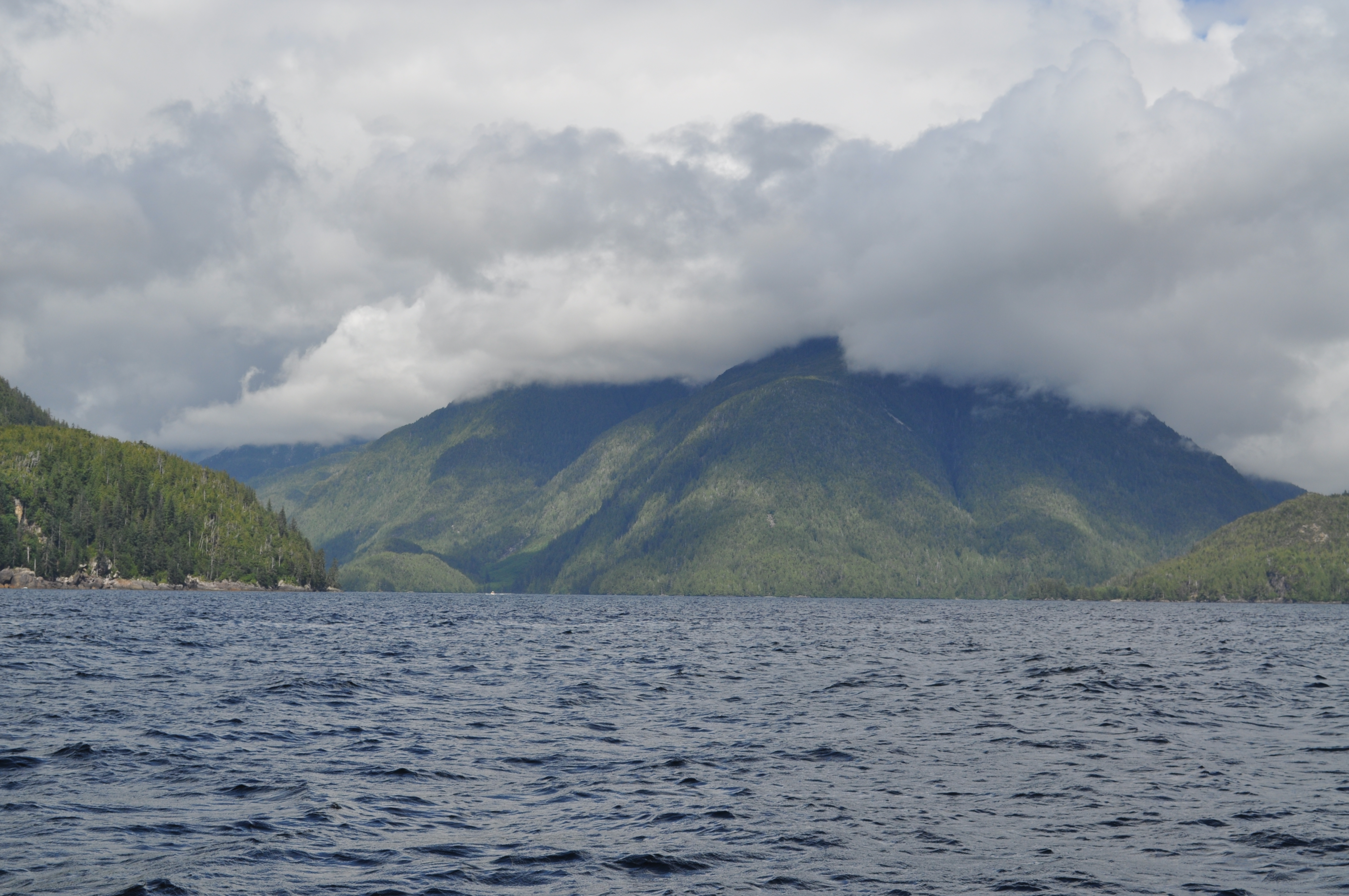
- View up Dawson Inlet from Skidegate Channel

- Location in British Columbia
- Location: Haida Gwaii, British Columbia, Canada
- Coordinates: 53°9′N 132°20′W
- Type: Channel
- Ocean/sea sources: Pacific Ocean
- Max. length: 33 kilometres (21 mi)
- Max. width: 4.3 kilometres (2.7 mi)

Skidegate Channel is a strait located in the Haida Gwaii archipelago of British Columbia, Canada. It divides the archipelago's two main islands, Graham Island to the north and Moresby Island to the south.

== Geography ==
Skidegate Channel is a located between Graham Island to the north, the Pacific Ocean to the west, Skidegate Inlet to the northeast, and Moresby Island to the south. The channel has a length of 33 kilometres (21 mi), a maximum width of 4.3 kilometres (2.7 mi), and a minimum width of no more than 65 metres (213 ft) at East Narrows. Dawson Inlet branches off to the north from Skidegate Channel near its western terminus at the Pacific Ocean. Trounce Inlet branches off to the north from Skidegate Channel near its midpoint.
