= Cumshewa Inlet =

Inlet in British Columbia, Canada

Coordinates: 53°3′N 131°47′W

Cumshewa Inlet (English: /ˈkʌmʃuːə/), also recorded or referred to in exploration logs as Cumchewas Harbour and Tooscondolth Sound, is a large inlet on the east coast of Moresby Island in the Haida Gwaii islands of the North Coast of British Columbia. The inlet was the site of various Haida villages, including Cumshewa (known as Thlinul or Tlkinool in the Haida language), Tanu (New Clew) and Djí-gua. The name for the inlet was conferred in the days of the Maritime Fur Trade following a custom whereby captains named locations for the most important local chief, in this case Cumshewa (or G'omshewah), who figures in maritime fur trade vessel logs from 1787 onwards. In 1794 Cumshewa and his followers massacred the crew of the American trading vessel Resolution in Cumshewa Inlet.
