= Maude Island =

Island in British Columbia, Canada

Coordinates: 53°12′16″N 132°04′37″W

Maude Island is an island in the Haida Gwaii archipelago of the North Coast region of British Columbia, Canada. It is located within Skidegate Inlet, a large saltwater inlet within Graham Island. It is the larger of two islands in British Columbia by that name, the other being a small islet offshore from Nanoose Bay and Lantzville on southeastern Vancouver Island.

It is the location of the former Haida village known as Haina. "Ha'ina" is the name of the island in Haad Kil, the Haida language.
