= Skidegate Inlet =

Inlet on the coast of British Columbia, Canada

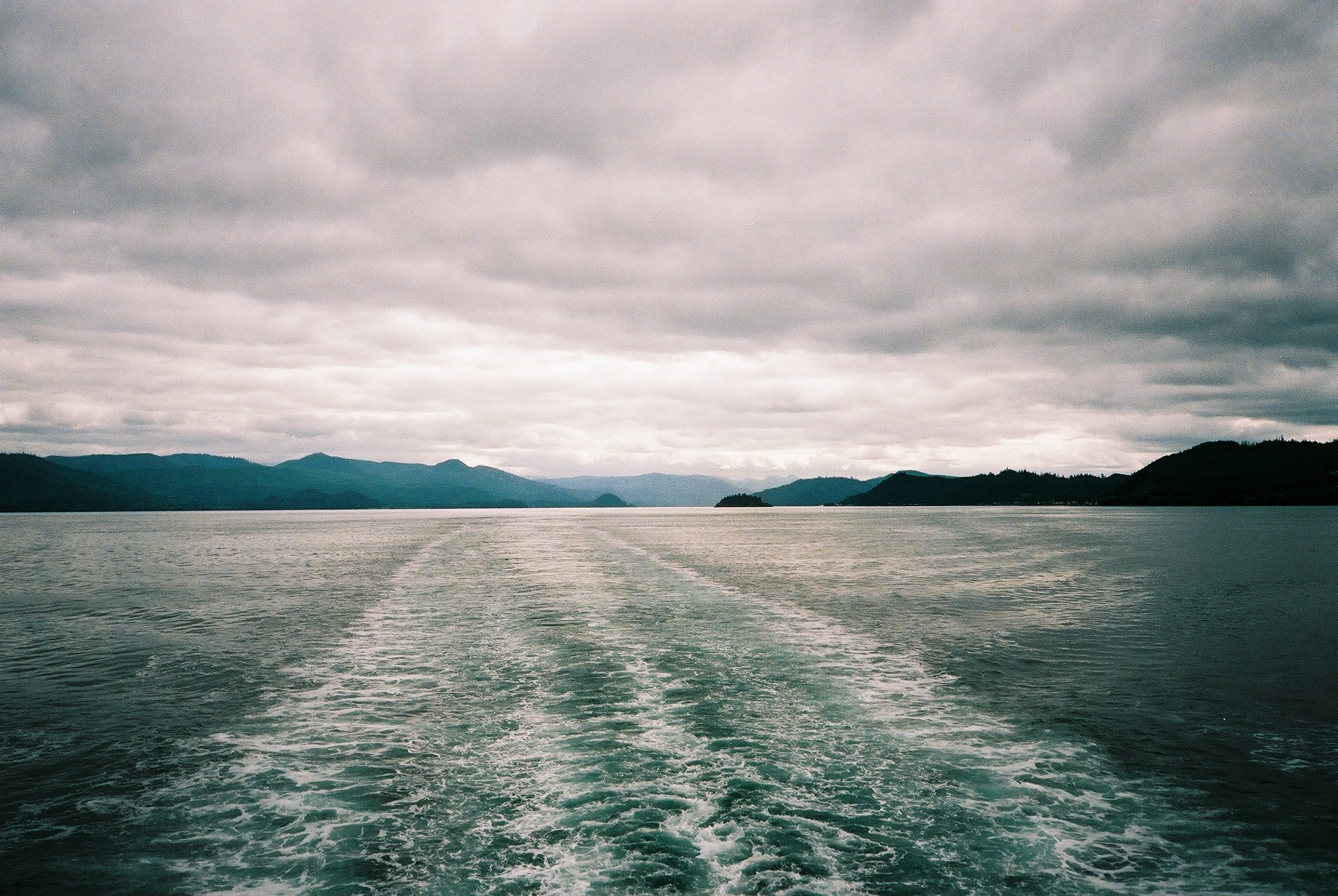
- View of Skidegate Inlet from the east

- Location in British Columbia
- Location: Haida Gwaii, British Columbia, Canada
- Coordinates: 53°14′N 132°02′W
- Type: Inlet
- Ocean/sea sources: Pacific Ocean
- Settlements: Daajing Giids, Skidegate

Skidegate Inlet is a broad inlet on the east coast of the Haida Gwaii archipelago of the North Coast of British Columbia, Canada. It is the easternmost of a series of waterways separating Graham Island to the north from Moresby Island to the south.

== Name origin ==
The name is derived from that of the village, which gets its name from one of the hereditary chiefs there, Chief Skidegate, whose chiefly name means "red paint stone".

== Geography ==
Skidegate Inlet is a located between Graham Island to the north, Skidegate Channel to the southwest, Hecate Strait to the east, and Moresby Island to the south.

The village of Daajing Giids (previously named Queen Charlotte) and community of Skidegate are located on its northern shore on Graham Island.
