= Skidegate =

Skidegate Hlg̱aagilda
- First Nation reserve
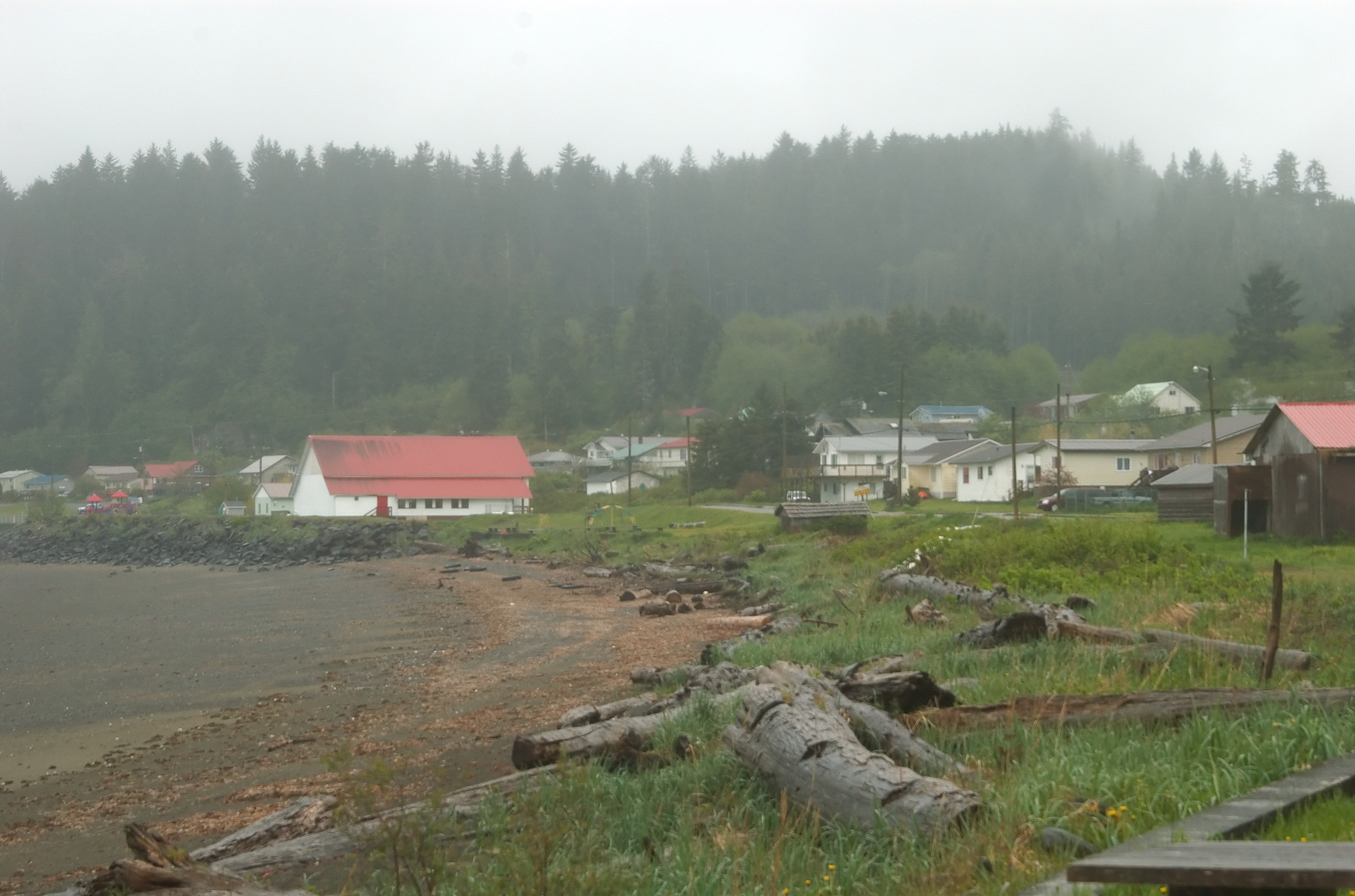
- View of the Kay Llnagaay beach in Skidegate.

- Location of Skidegate in Haida Gwaii
- Coordinates: 53°16′02″N 131°59′26″W
- Country: Canada
- Province: British Columbia
- Region: Haida Gwaii
- Regional district: North Coast
- Founded: 1850

Government
  - Type: Band government
  - Body: Skidegate Band Council
  - Chief Councillor: Willard Wilson

Area
  - Total: 5.65 km^{2} (2.18 sq mi)
- Elevation: 28 m (92 ft)

Population (2016)
  - Total: 837
  - Density: 138.3/km^{2} (358/sq mi)
- Time zone: UTC−8 (PST)
  - Summer (DST): UTC−7 (PDT)
- Highways: Highway 16 (TCH)
- Waterways: Hecate Strait

Skidegate /ˈskɪdɪɡɪt/ (Haida: Hlg̱aagilda) is a Haida community in Haida Gwaii in British Columbia, Canada. It is on the southeast coast of Graham Island, the largest island in the archipelago, and is approximately 50 kilometres (31 mi) west of mainland British Columbia across Hecate Strait.

Skidegate, which is on Skidegate Indian Reserve No. 1 and was formerly home to the Skidegate Mission is also the northern terminal for the BC Ferries service between Graham Island and Alliford Bay on Moresby Island.

The Haida Heritage Centre is in Skidegate along the town's eastern boundary.

== Naming ==
According to tradition, the village was named after an earlier village chief, Sg̱iida-gidg̱a Iihllngas, 'Son of the Chiton' whose name late 18th-century traders in sea otter pelts recorded as Skidegate. Between 1790 and 1820, the community was a hub for the exploitation of sea otter furs.

== Totem poles ==
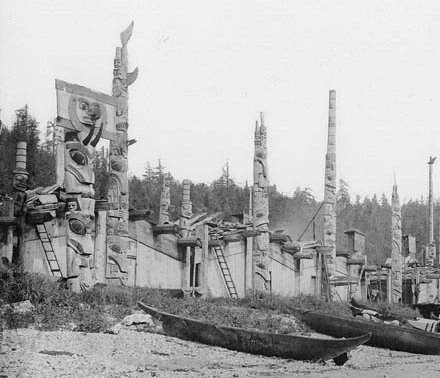
Houses and totem poles, Skidegate, 1878

Skidegate is home to a number of totem poles:

- T'anuu'llnagaay (Tanu) by Giitsxaa
- Hlknul'llnagaay (Cumshewa) by Gidansda Guujaaw
- HlGaagilda'llnagaay (Skidegate) by Norman Price
- K'uuna'llnagaay (Skedans) by Jim Hart
- Ts'aahj'llnagaay (Chaatl) by Garner Moody
- Eagle and Bear Mother by Dick Bellis
- Dogfish, by Bill Reid
- Unity Pole
- Chief Skedans Jimmy Wilson Memorial by Bert Wilson and Joe Mander
- Strongman by Tim Boyko, Skaadgaa Naay elementary school
- Chief Wiiganaad Sid Crosby Naa'uuwans (chieftanship) by Tim Boyko and Jason Goetzinger
- Weeping Woman of Taanu by Norman Price St
- Chieftanship Pole to Honour Matriarch Barb Wilson
- SGang Gwaay'llnagaay (Ninstints) by Tim Boyko
- Kaay Watchman's pole

== See also ==
- Council of the Haida Nation
- Skidegate Band Council
- List of Haida villages
