= Moresby Island =

Island in Canada

Gwaii Haanas (Haida)
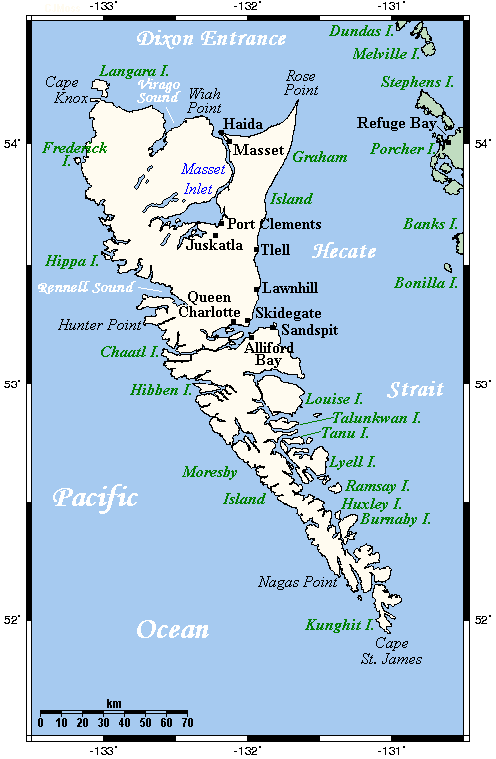
- Haida Gwaii. Moresby Island is the large southern island. Alaska lies north

- Location within British Columbia

Geography
- Location: Pacific Ocean
- Coordinates: 53°04′44″N 132°07′40″W
- Archipelago: Haida Gwaii
- Area: 2,929.22 km^{2} (1,130.98 sq mi) (2026)
- Area rank: 30th in Canada & 170th worldwide

Administration
- Canada
- Province: British Columbia
- Regional District Electoral Area: North Coast Regional District Electoral Area E
- Electoral Area Director: Evan Putterill
- Largest settlement: Sandspit

Demographics
- Population: 325 (2021)
- Pop. density: 0.10/km^{2} (0.26/sq mi)

Moresby Island (Haida: Gwaii Haanas) is a large island (2,929.22 km^{2} [1,130.98 sq mi]) that forms part of the Haida Gwaii archipelago (formerly known as Queen Charlotte Islands) in British Columbia, Canada, located at 53°04′44″N 132°07′40″W It is separated by the narrow Skidegate Channel from the other principal island of the group to the north, Graham Island. Gwaii Haanas National Park Reserve and Haida Heritage Site includes Moresby and other islands. The island, together with numerous nearby smaller islands and islets in the southern archipelago, is defined by Statistics Canada as North Coast E, Regional district electoral area, with a population of 325 as of the 2010 census. Almost all of its population, 310 people, resided in the unincorporated community of Sandspit, on the northeast corner of Moresby. The total land area of the electoral area is 3,408.85 km^{2} (1,316.16 sq mi). Moresby Island is the 170th largest island in the world, and the 30th largest island in Canada. On October 27, 2012, the Haida Gwaii earthquake of magnitude 7.7 (the strongest earthquake in Canada since the 1949 Queen Charlotte Islands earthquake) was epicentres at a depth of 17.5 km (10.9 mi) under the island.

== Name ==
Moresby Island is named for Rear Admiral Fairfax Moresby of the Royal Navy, as is the smaller Moresby Island in the Gulf Islands. The traditional name in the Haida language is Gwaii Haanas, which is the source of the national park name.

Moresby Island (Haida: Gwaii Haanas)
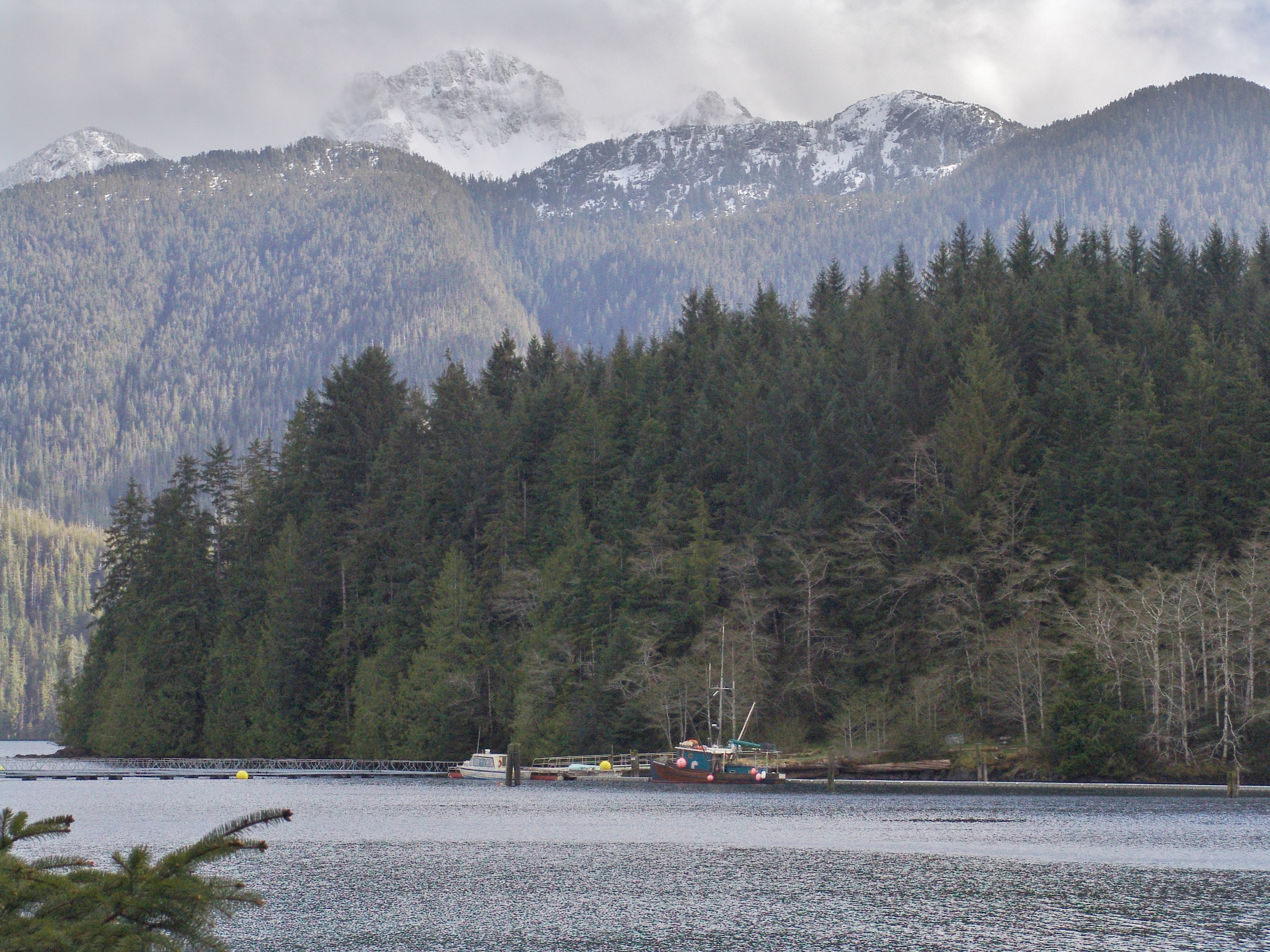
Newcombe Peak in April 2013

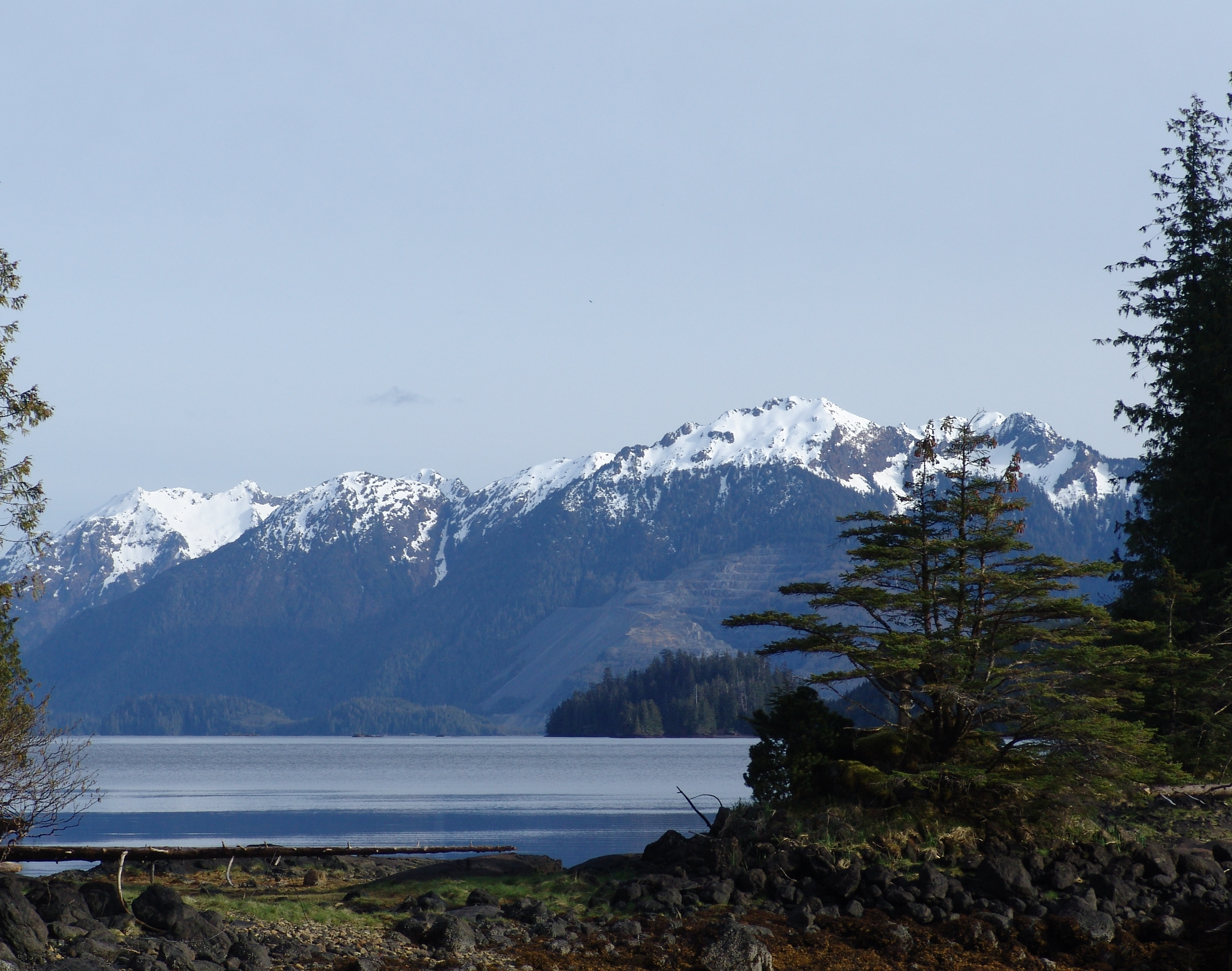
Tasu Mountain Range in May 2006

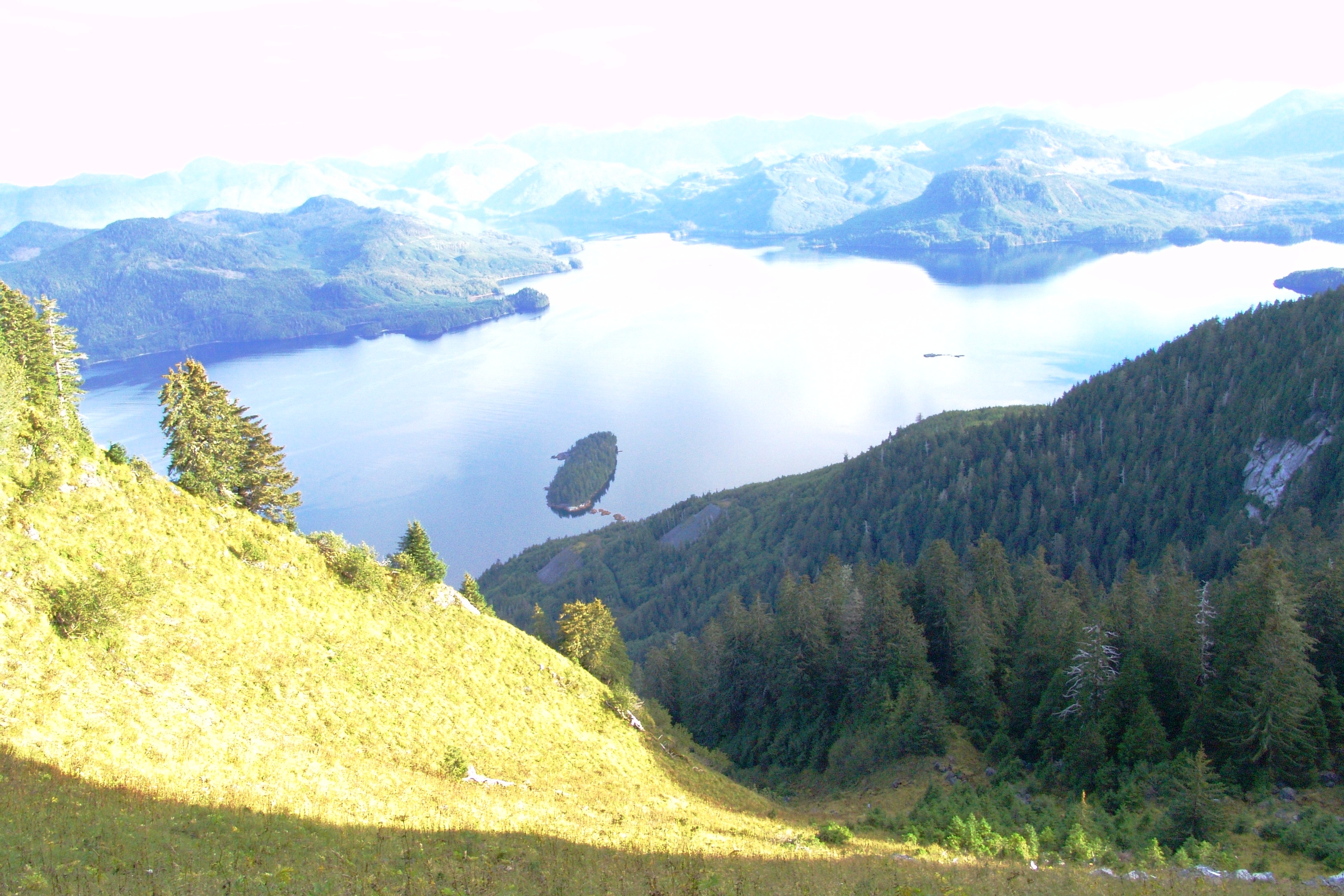
View of Tasu Mountain

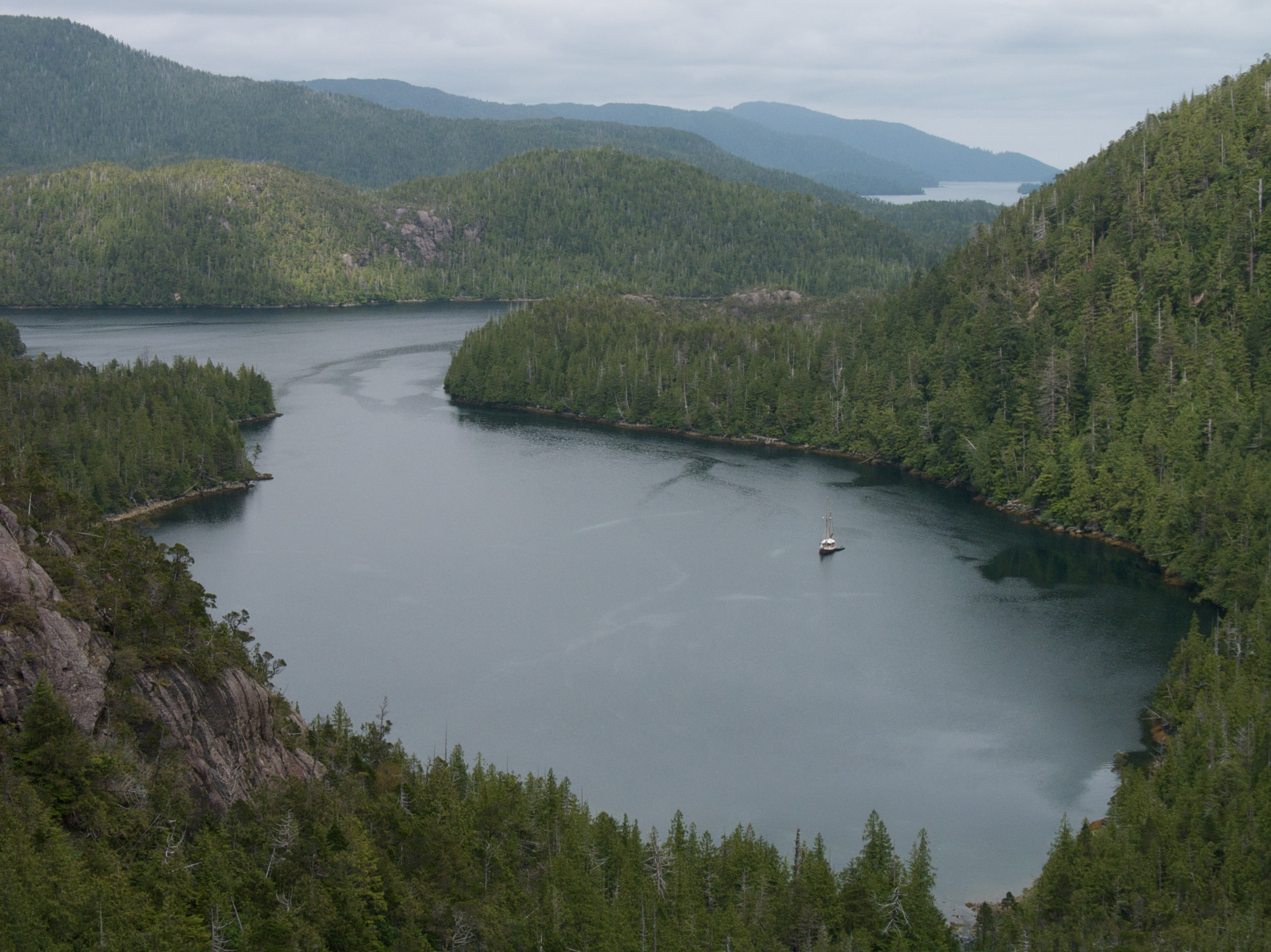
Sac Bay

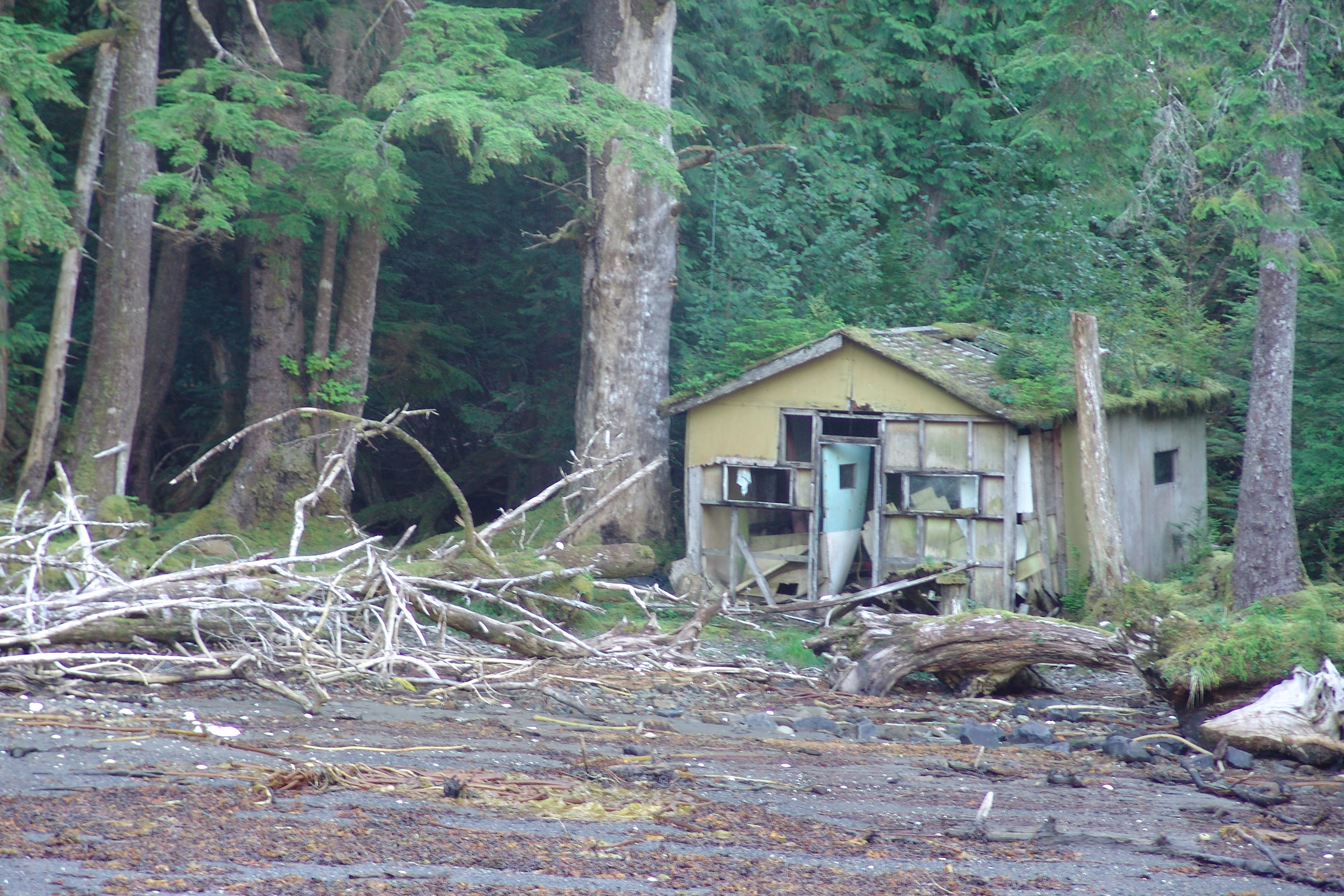
A hidden cabin at Tasu

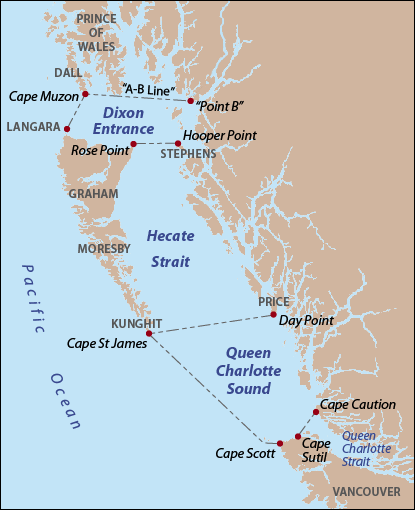
Map showing the location and delineation of Queen Charlotte Sound, Hecate Strait, and Dixon Entrance in relation to the island

== Climate ==
Climate is from Sandspit Airport. The island experiences an oceanic climate (Köppen Cfb) with a rainy season in the colder months. This climate is typical for the Pacific Northwest. The island is very warm for its high latitude in North America. Its annual average temperature is the same as that of Port Hardy, which is located almost three degrees further south.

Climate data for Sandspit (Sandspit Airport) Climate ID: 1057050; coordinates 53°15′14″N 131°48′47″W; elevation: 6.4 m (21 ft); 1991–2020 normals, extremes 1945−present (Note: Composite station metadata: Sandspit Airport AUTO; Climate ID: 1057051; WMO ID: 71101; coordinates 53°14′58″N 131°48′47″W; 6.5 m (21 ft): Sandspit; Climate ID: 1057052; WMO ID: 71111; coordinates 53°15′15″N 131°48′50″W; 6.4 m (21 ft): Sandspit AWOS; Climate ID: 1057055; coordinates 53°15′15″N 131°48′50″W; 6.4 m (21 ft))
Month	Jan	Feb	Mar	Apr	May	Jun	Jul	Aug	Sep	Oct	Nov	Dec	Year
Record high humidex	14.3	13.3	13.8	15.4	23.0	27.1	30.8	30.2	26.4	22.0	17.6	16.6	30.8
Record high °C (°F)	13.3 (55.9)	13.4 (56.1)	14.1 (57.4)	18.9 (66.0)	21.7 (71.1)	26.7 (80.1)	27.8 (82.0)	26.7 (80.1)	24.1 (75.4)	20.6 (69.1)	16.3 (61.3)	13.4 (56.1)	27.8 (82.0)
Mean daily maximum °C (°F)	6.5 (43.7)	6.6 (43.9)	7.4 (45.3)	9.7 (49.5)	12.5 (54.5)	15.0 (59.0)	17.4 (63.3)	18.2 (64.8)	16.1 (61.0)	12.3 (54.1)	8.7 (47.7)	6.7 (44.1)	11.4 (52.5)
Daily mean °C (°F)	4.1 (39.4)	4.2 (39.6)	4.5 (40.1)	6.7 (44.1)	9.7 (49.5)	12.3 (54.1)	14.7 (58.5)	15.3 (59.5)	13.2 (55.8)	9.5 (49.1)	6.1 (43.0)	4.3 (39.7)	8.7 (47.7)
Mean daily minimum °C (°F)	1.8 (35.2)	1.7 (35.1)	1.6 (34.9)	3.7 (38.7)	6.8 (44.2)	9.5 (49.1)	11.9 (53.4)	12.4 (54.3)	10.3 (50.5)	6.7 (44.1)	3.5 (38.3)	1.8 (35.2)	6.0 (42.8)
Record low °C (°F)	−13.9 (7.0)	−12.3 (9.9)	−12.2 (10.0)	−5.1 (22.8)	−1.1 (30.0)	2.2 (36.0)	5.0 (41.0)	1.9 (35.4)	−0.6 (30.9)	−3.1 (26.4)	−15.5 (4.1)	−12.8 (9.0)	−15.5 (4.1)
Record low wind chill	−22.9	−24.1	−22.9	−10.8	−3.4	0.0	0.0	0.0	0.0	−10.7	−26.0	−20.8	−26.0
Average precipitation mm (inches)	166.9 (6.57)	118.1 (4.65)	118.1 (4.65)	94.2 (3.71)	54.2 (2.13)	49.3 (1.94)	48.6 (1.91)	57.6 (2.27)	78.3 (3.08)	164.2 (6.46)	175.3 (6.90)	197.2 (7.76)	1,322.1 (52.05)
Average rainfall mm (inches)	157.9 (6.22)	120.9 (4.76)	116.5 (4.59)	93.0 (3.66)	57.6 (2.27)	48.3 (1.90)	48.0 (1.89)	60.1 (2.37)	78.9 (3.11)	166.7 (6.56)	180.8 (7.12)	193.4 (7.61)	1,322.1 (52.05)
Average snowfall cm (inches)	12.0 (4.7)	3.5 (1.4)	6.5 (2.6)	0.4 (0.2)	0.0 (0.0)	0.0 (0.0)	0.0 (0.0)	0.0 (0.0)	0.0 (0.0)	0.0 (0.0)	1.6 (0.6)	5.0 (2.0)	28.9 (11.4)
Average precipitation days (≥ 0.2 mm)	22.2	18.7	22.1	20.7	16.0	14.8	15.1	13.9	17.2	22.3	23.3	25.1	231.3
Average rainy days (≥ 0.2 mm)	21.1	17.8	21.1	20.2	16.2	14.8	15.0	14.4	17.3	22.6	23.2	24.0	227.6
Average snowy days (≥ 0.2 cm)	2.6	1.6	2.1	0.45	0.0	0.0	0.0	0.0	0.0	0.0	0.87	1.6	9.1
Average relative humidity (%) (at 1500 LST)	84.8	79.1	75.9	76.2	75.4	76.9	76.6	76.5	77.4	79.1	82.2	84.6	78.7
Average dew point °C (°F)	0.6 (33.1)	1.8 (35.2)	1.7 (35.1)	3.6 (38.5)	6.2 (43.2)	8.8 (47.8)	11.1 (52.0)	11.9 (53.4)	10.5 (50.9)	7.2 (45.0)	3.9 (39.0)	1.9 (35.4)	5.8 (42.4)
Mean monthly sunshine hours	48.6	78.1	118.1	154.6	199.1	176.8	186.6	186.8	141.8	97.9	63	47	1,498.1
Percentage possible sunshine	19.3	28.2	32.2	36.9	40.5	34.9	36.7	40.8	37.1	29.7	24.1	19.9	31.7
Source: Environment and Climate Change Canada (sunshine 1971–2000) (dew point at 1300 LST, 1951–1980)
