= Epps =

Epps may refer to:

== People ==
- Aaron Epps (born 1996), American basketball player
- Anna Epps (1930–2017), American microbiologist and medical school dean and CEO
- Archie Epps (1937–2003), American academic and dean of students at Harvard College
- Aubrey Epps (1912–1984), American baseball player
- Ben T. Epps (1888–1937), American pioneering aviator and airplane designer
- Bobby Epps (1932–2014), American football player
- Bubber Epps (born 1943), American politician
- Charles Epps (disambiguation), various people
- Chris Epps (born 1961), U.S. state department of corrections commissioner
- Christina Epps (born 1991), American triple jumper
- Danny Epps (1941–2007), American musician
- Dedrick Epps (born 1988), American football player
- Edwin Epps (1808–1867), American cotton planter and slave owner of kidnapped free black Solomon Northup (1807/08–c. 1863), whose ordeal is detailed in the memoir Twelve Years a Slave
- Elisabeth Epps, American politician
- Garrett Epps (born 1950), American law professor, novelist and journalist
- George Epps (disambiguation), various people
- Hal Epps (1914–2004), American baseball player
- Harland Epps, American astronomer
- Harold T. Epps Sr. (died 1962), American attorney
- Jack Epps (disambiguation), various people
- Jeanette Epps (born 1970), American astronaut
- JoAnne A. Epps (1951–2023), American law professor, author and Executive Vice President and Provost of Temple University
- John Epps (1805–1869), English physician, phrenologist, homeopath and political activist
- Joseph L. Epps (1870–1952), United States Army private who received the Medal of Honor
- L. Macon Epps (1920–2012), American engineer, inventor, author, and poet
- Leonidas Epps (1918–1997), American sports coach and athletics administrator
- Lyman Epps Sr. and Jr., American enslaved people
- Makayla Epps (born 1995), American basketball player
- Marcus Epps (disambiguation), various people
- Mary Ellen Epps (1934–2014), American politician
- Matt Van Epps (born 1983), American politician
- Michael Epps (born 1992), British racing driver
- Mike Epps (born 1970), American actor and comedian
- Omar Epps (born 1973), American actor
- Orlo Epps (1864–1926), American architect, mathematician, physicist and socialist
- Oties Epps (born 1978), American women's basketball coach
- Patience Epps, American linguist
- Phil Epps (born 1959), American football player
- Preston Epps (1930–2019), American percussionist
- Ray Epps (disambiguation), various people
- Roselyn P. Epps (1930–2014), American pediatrician and first African-American president of the American Medical Women's Association
- Shareeka Epps (born 1989), American actress
- Sheldon Epps (born 1952), American television and theater director
- Stuart Epps, British record producer and audio engineer
- Tauheed Epps (born 1977), American rapper known professionally as 2 Chainz
- Thomas H. Epps III, American chemist
- Tory Epps (1967–2005), American football player
- W. Epps (died 1833), English cricket writer and historian in the late 18th century

== Places in the United States ==
- Epps, Louisiana, a village
- Epps Township, Butler County, Missouri

== Other ==
- HEPPS (molecule) (or EPPS), common names for the compound 3-[4-(2-Hydroxyethyl)-1-piperazinyl]propanesulfonic acid
- Edwards Personal Preference Schedule
- Energetic Particle and Plasma Spectrometer, an instrument aboard MESSENGER space probe that measures the charged particles in the magnetosphere around Mercury
- Epps effect, in econometrics and time series analysis, the phenomenon that the empirical correlation between the returns of two different stocks decreases as the sampling frequency of data increases
- Epps 1907 Monoplane, a pioneering aircraft built and flown in 1907 by Ben T. Epps
- Half-Sack Epps, a fictional character on the TV series Sons of Anarchy

== See also ==
- Eppes (disambiguation)
