= Ross Bay Villa =

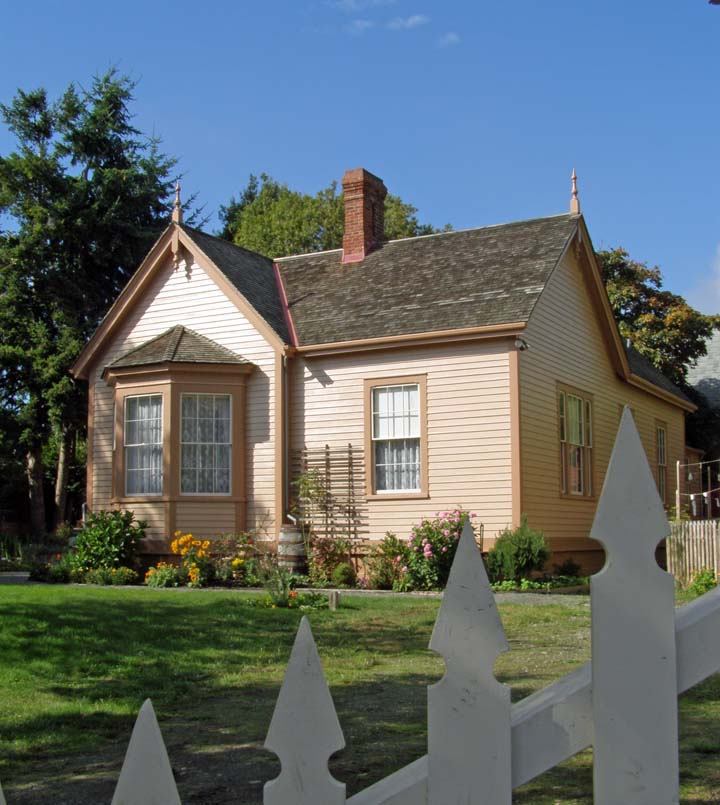
- Ross Bay Villa, south façade
- Interactive map of Ross Bay Villa
- Type: Historic House Museum
- Location: 1490 Fairfield Road; Victoria, British Columbia; V8S 1E8
- Coordinates: 48°24′43″N 123°20′30″W
- Built: 1865
- Architect: John Wright, likely
- Architectural style: Gothic Revival
- Owner: Ross Bay Villa Society

The Ross Bay Villa is a historic house museum, at 1490 Fairfield Road in Victoria, British Columbia, owned and operated by the Ross Bay Villa Society. The single-family home, built in 1865, is a Heritage Designated building in the City of Victoria. The Villa is one of only about 10 residences in Victoria known to survive from before 1870.

Originally located on a 1.9-acre parcel owned by Charles Buxton, an English philanthropist and MP, the one-storey cottage was built five km from the growing town of Victoria, well outside the existing town limits, and served only by a dirt trail to the nearest neighbours, Mrs. Isabella Ross (the first woman to own property in the colony), and Robert Burnaby. The house was largely surrounded by bush, farmland and the swamps of Fairfield, Greater Victoria. The first occupants were Francis James Roscoe and his wife Anna Letitia Roscoe. The house was likely designed by John Wright, the only full-time professional architect practising in Victoria at the time. Wright has been described as the founding father of BC's architectural establishment. The Villa, which was not so named until 1882–83, was designed in the popular Gothic Revival architecture style, in which John Wright specialised.

== Style ==
The Gothic Revival elements at the Ross Bay Villa include the porch with turned columns and trefoil in the gable; finials on four peaks; and chamfered exterior window detailing.

== The house ==
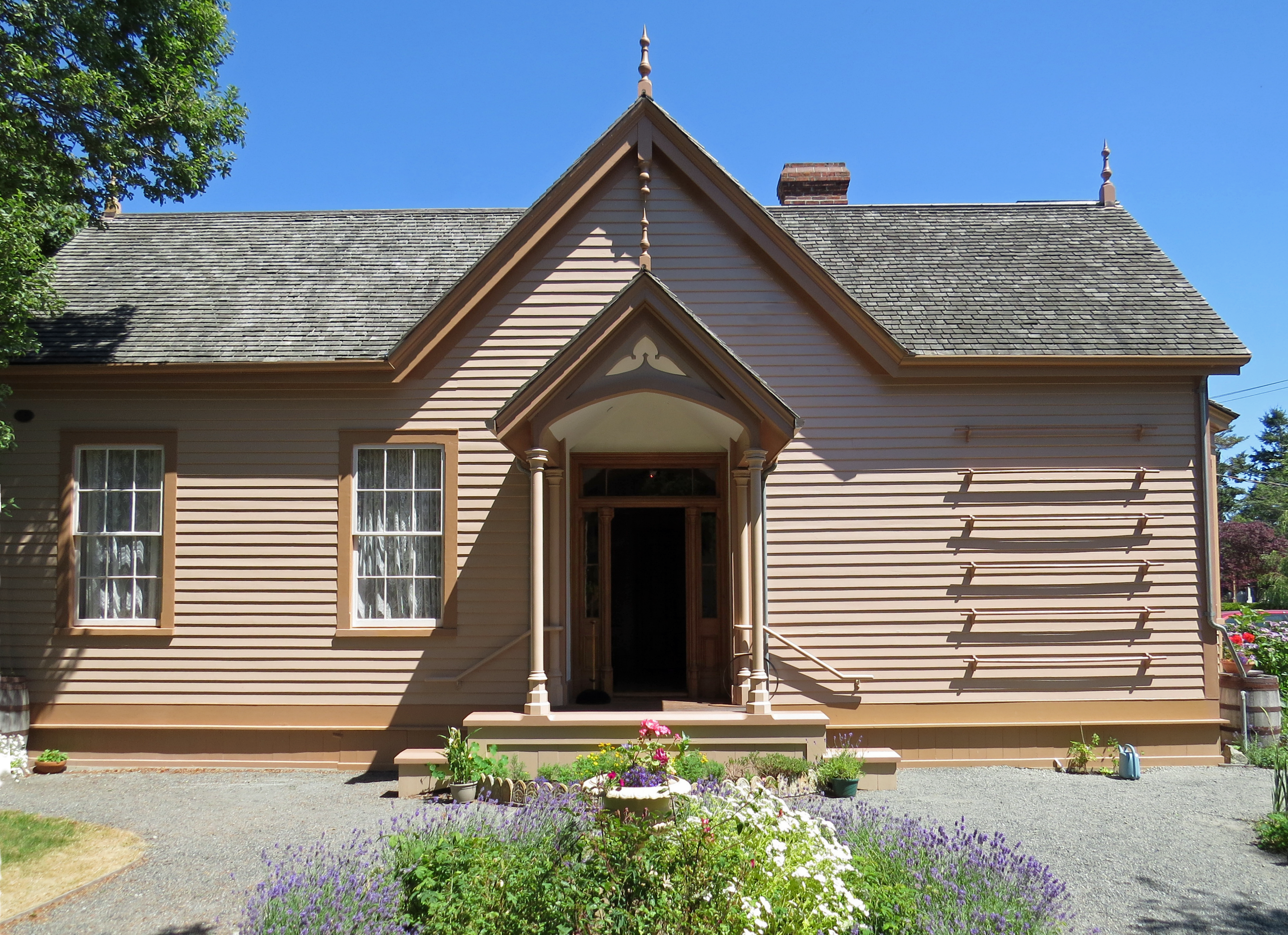
Ross Bay Villa front porch

The house appears small from the outside, but measures approximately 1,650 square feet, all on one floor. The main house has 12-foot ceilings; the original rear kitchen annex is much more compact. Other significant design elements include: A split-flue chimney; an angled front bay with hipped roof; recessed porch with sidelights and transom and original front door, all originally finished in faux oak; an unusual double-ridged roof; six-over-six windows; an original cast-iron fireplace, a marbleized mantle; a plaster ceiling medallion.

== Property history ==
In 1869, Sir James Douglas (governor), retired Governor of British Columbia, described the house, built four years earlier, in a letter to his daughter as a pretty cottage, half-buried in roses and honeysuckle.... Over time, it changed hands several times, and several large families were born and raised here. In 1912, the acreage was subdivided into 14 lots. The house straddled two lots, so retains both. By the late 1980s the residence needed major work, and in 1988 it was bought for potential development. The building continued to deteriorate and became an eyesore. In 1992, owners agreed to the property being placed on the Victoria City Heritage Register. However, development plans fell through, and in 1998 developers proposed to demolish the house, and replace it with townhouses. Heritage advocates encouraged The Land Conservancy of British Columbia to buy the property, for restoration as a heritage resource.

Today, the house and garden comprise a Historic house museum, operated by the Ross Bay Villa Society, open for tours and available for special events. One room is headquarters for the Old Cemeteries Society. The house and garden can be rented for such events as weddings.

== Occupants ==
Ross Bay Villa has had several significant owners/occupants.

Francis James Roscoe (1830–78) and his wife, Anna Letitia Le Breton, raised five children in the house, until Roscoe's early death, in 1878. Roscoe was grandson of the prominent Liverpool Unitarian reformer and MP, William Roscoe. Francis Roscoe, with a business background in the U.K., moved to Victoria in 1862 and joined with Arthur Fellows to form Fellows & Roscoe Hardware, serving miners heading for the Cariboo Gold Rush and the growing town. Roscoe became politically active, and was elected Liberal MP for Victoria, 1874–8. (He did not run a second time, and his seat was taken by Prime Minister Sir John A. Macdonald.) Roscoe, said to be suffering from depression, apparently shot himself in December 1878. Mrs. Roscoe returned to England with her five children, and the house was subsequently rented to George Winter, coachman to the colonial governor and to several lieutenant-governors. Winter purchased the property in 1889, and rented to Harvey and Margaret Combe. Combe, registrar to the BC Supreme Court, is credited with founding the Victoria Golf Club in 1893, Canada's oldest golf club. A photograph of the Combe family in front of the Villa is the earliest known picture of the house. The Winter family lived in the house, 1892–1911. Subsequent occupants included stonemason John Mortimer, founder of Mortimer's Monumental Works. Many monuments in the Ross Bay Cemetery, opposite, bear his mark.

== Restoration ==
On January 2, 2000, volunteers began clean-up and restoration of the Villa, clearing the house and grounds of debris and securing the building envelope. With the aid of donations and several grants, a new roof and new electrical, plumbing, alarm and fire suppression systems were installed. Volunteers replaced all the decaying foundation posts, and mounted the house's first-ever under-floor insulation and heating. On the interior, samples of every wallpaper were analyzed, with more than 100 patterns being identified, including originals in the dining-room and drawing-room, which have been reproduced on vintage wallpaper printing machines. Other papers will be made as funding and time allows. Original paint colours have been matched on all woodwork. Faux-wood panelling paper was hand-made to match the original in the entry hall. Floor coverings have been meticulously replicated by hand. When Mrs. Roscoe left the house, she sold the contents by auction, and the 1879 auction list has provided guidance in acquiring appropriate furnishings. The dining-room, drawing room, kitchen and entry hall are now virtually complete, with furnishings, books, chinaware, pictures and oil-lamps from the 1860s & '70s.

== The garden ==
Most details of the original garden have been lost over 150 years. However, there was evidence of a circular flower-bed in front of the porch. Several ancient fruit trees have survived, though none is as old as the house.

The restoration plan calls for all trees, bushes, perennials and annuals to be appropriate to the 1860s and '70s, including a vegetable garden, based on contemporary nursery catalogues. Early roses and honeysuckle are being trained to grow up the house, following Sir James Douglas' description. A flowering ginger plant, Roscoea purpurea, is particularly prized, as it is named after Roscoe's grandfather, William Roscoe. Roscoea purpurea. Nick Russell photo

== The Ross Bay Villa Society ==
The Society was incorporated 17 January 2013. It is a registered charity with the purpose of protecting, researching and promoting the Ross Bay Villa. When The Land Conservancy encountered financial difficulties, the Ross Bay Villa Society began fund-raising to purchase the property, which was completed in October 2015. The year 2015 was also celebrated as the Villa's 150th Birthday, with special events and tours throughout the year.

== See also ==
Barr, Jones & Edwards, Ross Bay Villa: A Colonial Cottage. 2000.
