= Peter O'Reilly (civil servant) =

Canadian civil servant

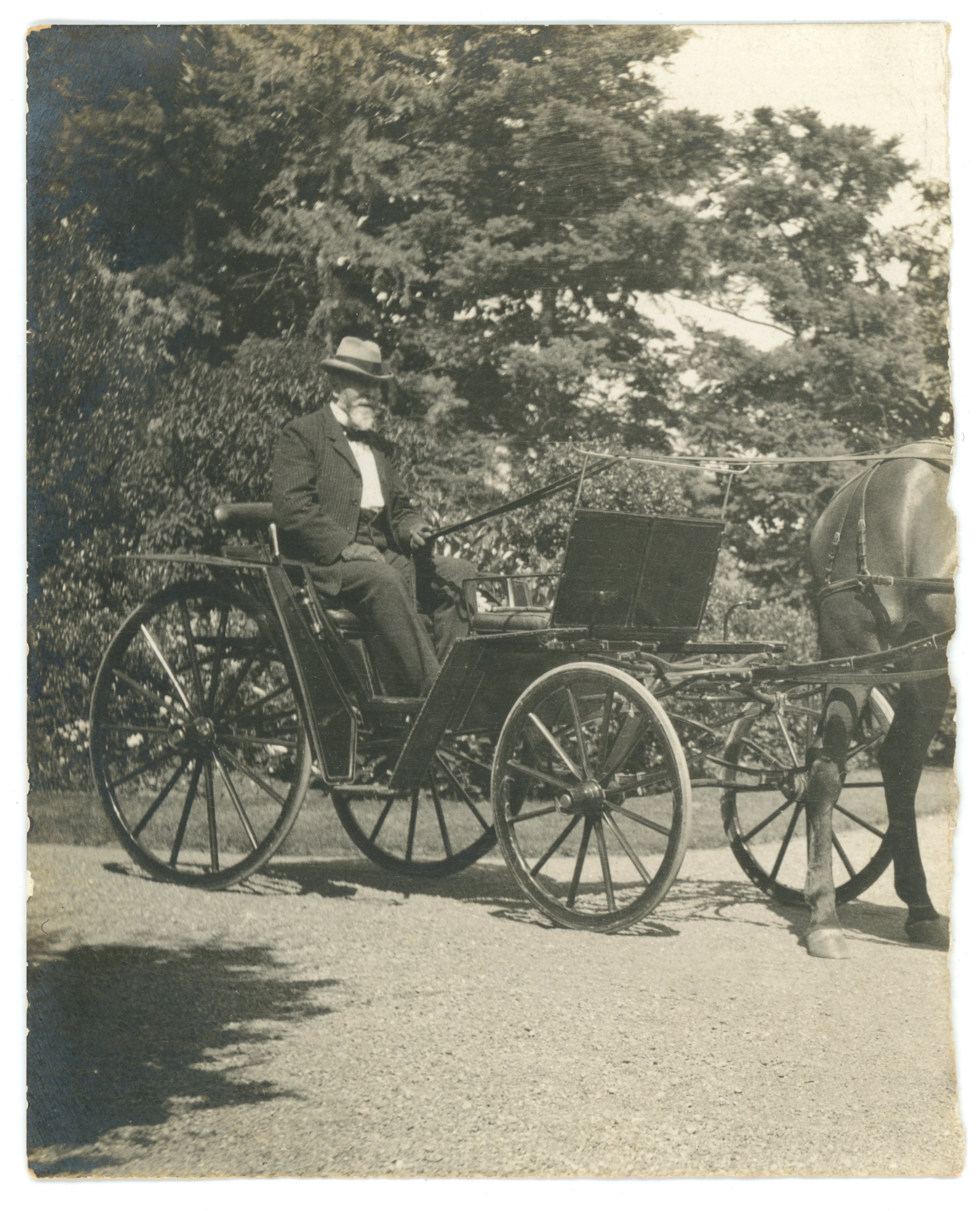
- O'Reilly c. 1900
- Born: March 27, 1827; Ince, England
- Died: September 3, 1905 (aged 78); Victoria, British Columbia, Canada
- Resting place: Ross Bay Cemetery; 48.4114°N 123.3399°W
- Occupations: Indian reserve commissioner; magistrate; gold commissioner; sheriff
- Years active: 1860–1898
- Known for: Establishing Indian reserves in British Columbia
- Spouse: Caroline Agnes Trutch (m. 1863)
- Children: 4
- Relatives: Joseph Trutch (brother-in-law)

Peter O'Reilly (27 March 1827 – 3 September 1905) was a prominent settler and official in colonial British Columbia who held a variety of positions, most notably as the head of a commission struck to revise and allocate Indian reserves throughout the province.

== Biography ==
Peter O'Reilly was born in Ireland in 1827 and immigrated to Canada in 1859. Peter married Caroline Agnes Trutch (sister to John and Sir Joseph W. Trutch) in 1863 and moved into Point Ellice House in December 1867. The couple had four children: Francis "Frank" Joseph O'Reilly, Charlotte Kathleen O'Reilly, Mary Augusta O'Reilly, and Arthur John "Jack" O'Reilly. A carriage accident in 1885 left him immobile for several months. The injuries sustained during this accident would cause him to walk with a cane for the remainder of his life.

== Indian Reserve Commissioner ==
O'Reilly was appointed as Indian Reserve Commissioner in 1880 and served in this position for 18 years before retiring in 1898. He was criticized in his time and by latter-day academics for largely shirking his duties and avoiding meetings with First Nations leaders, but the basis of the Indian Reserve system as it remains in British Columbia today is the outcome of his assignment, known informally as the O'Reilly Commission. O'Reilly was also the second Gold Commissioner of the Rock Creek Mining District, replacing W.G. Cox at the time of the Governor's visit during the Rock Creek War.

== Point Ellice House ==
O'Reilly's residence in Victoria, Point Ellice House, is preserved today as a house museum and gardens. Positioned overlooking Selkirk Water and the Gorge Waterway, Point Ellice House was constructed between 1861 and 1862 for Catherine and Charles Wentworth Wallace. Architects Wright & Sanders chose an Italianate Villa-style design that was popular during the nineteenth century. The Canadian Register of Historic Places lists the character-defining elements of the house as:

- The house's location next to the Gorge Waterway, with access to the place from both land and water
- The design of the house as a single storey (plus attic) rambling Victorian Italianate villa with all of its details, such as the shallow-pitched gabled roofs, wide overhanging bracketed eaves, verandahs and porches, medieval style chimneys, tall spacious windows and classical detailing
- The asymmetrical floor plan and spatial configuration of the interior, with its narrow halls and enclosed rooms, and the physical integrity of its finishes, such as floors, wall coverings, ceilings, doors, moldings and architectural hardware
- All of the mature historic garden and landscaping features, which include the croquet/tennis lawns, pathways, rose bushes, flower beds, mature trees and shrubs, and the sequoia tree planted by Peter O’Reilly
- The unobstructed views and relationship between house and garden
- The existing form and materials of the carriage shed.

Point Ellice House was designated a National Historic Site in 1966 and became a Provincial Historic Site in 1975. The house is also listed on the City of Victoria's heritage registry. It is located right next to the site of the Point Ellice Bridge Disaster.

== See also ==
- Gold Commissioner
- Indian Act
