= Ray Epps =

Ray Epps or Raymond Epps may refer to:

- Ray Epps (basketball) (born 1956), basketball player
- Ray Epps (military veteran) (born 1961), military veteran known for his association with the January 6 United States Capitol attack
- Raymond Epps, a member of the 2015 Arizona State Sun Devils football team

== See also ==
- Epps (disambiguation)
