= Church of St. James the Apostle =

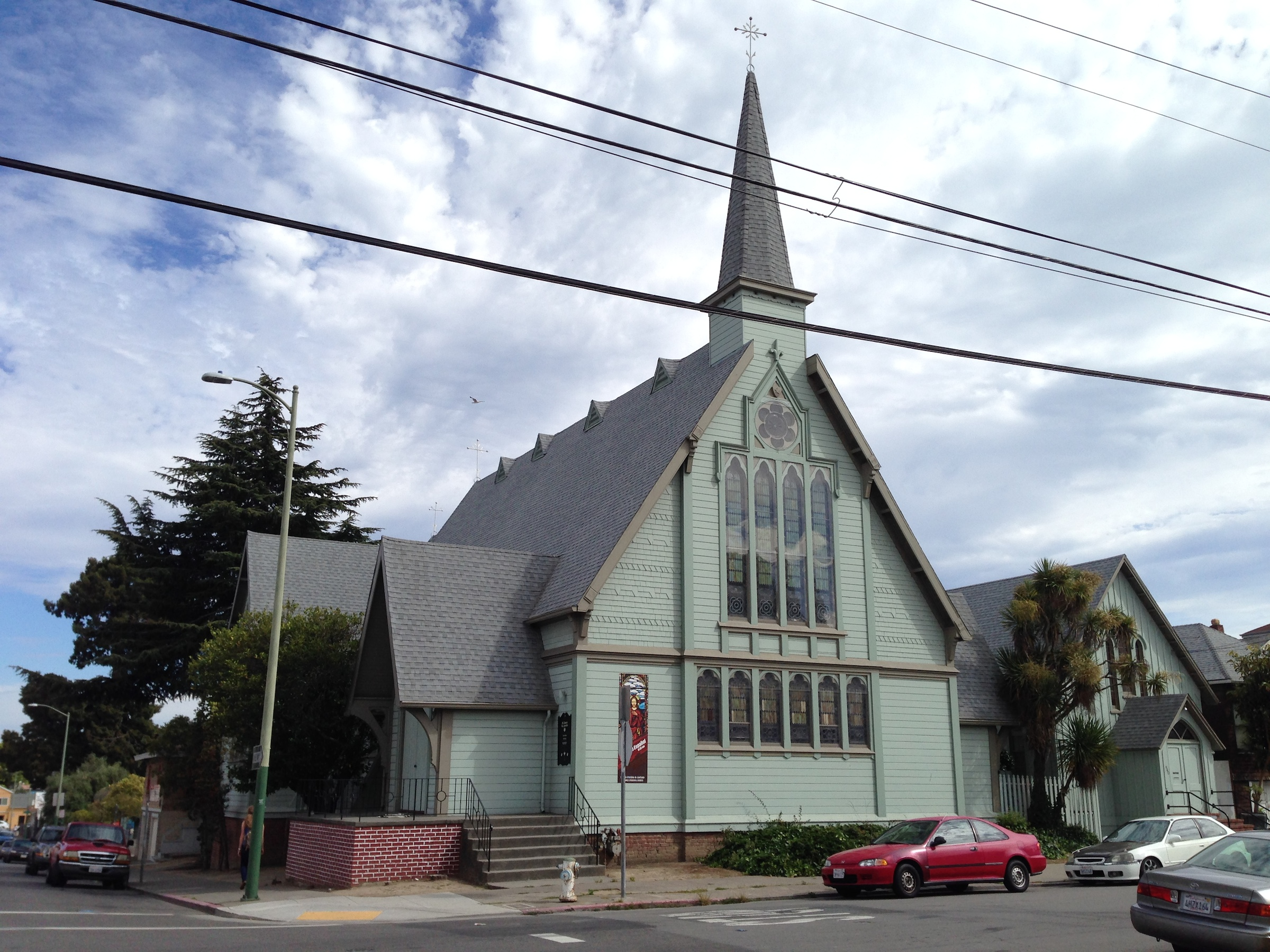
- St. James Episcopal Church in 2015
- Interactive map of Church of St. James the Apostle
- 37.791693°N 122.246069°W
- Location: 1540 12th Ave., Oakland, California

California Historical Landmark
- Designated: September 11, 1959
- Reference no.: 694

Oakland Designated Landmark
- Designated: May 29, 1984
- Reference no.: 83

The Church of St. James the Apostle, or as it is known today as St. James Episcopal Church or Iglesia Episcopal de Santiago is an Episcopal church in Oakland, California, United States. The church has been providing weekly services without break since 1858. It is a California Historical Landmark.

== History ==
The church was founded by Bishop William Ingraham Kip. Its first day of service was June 27, 1858. The first church, completed circa 1860, is now used as a parish house. The current church was built in 1886 to a design by San Francisco architects Wright & Sanders.
