= Lick Observatory =

Astronomical observatory in California

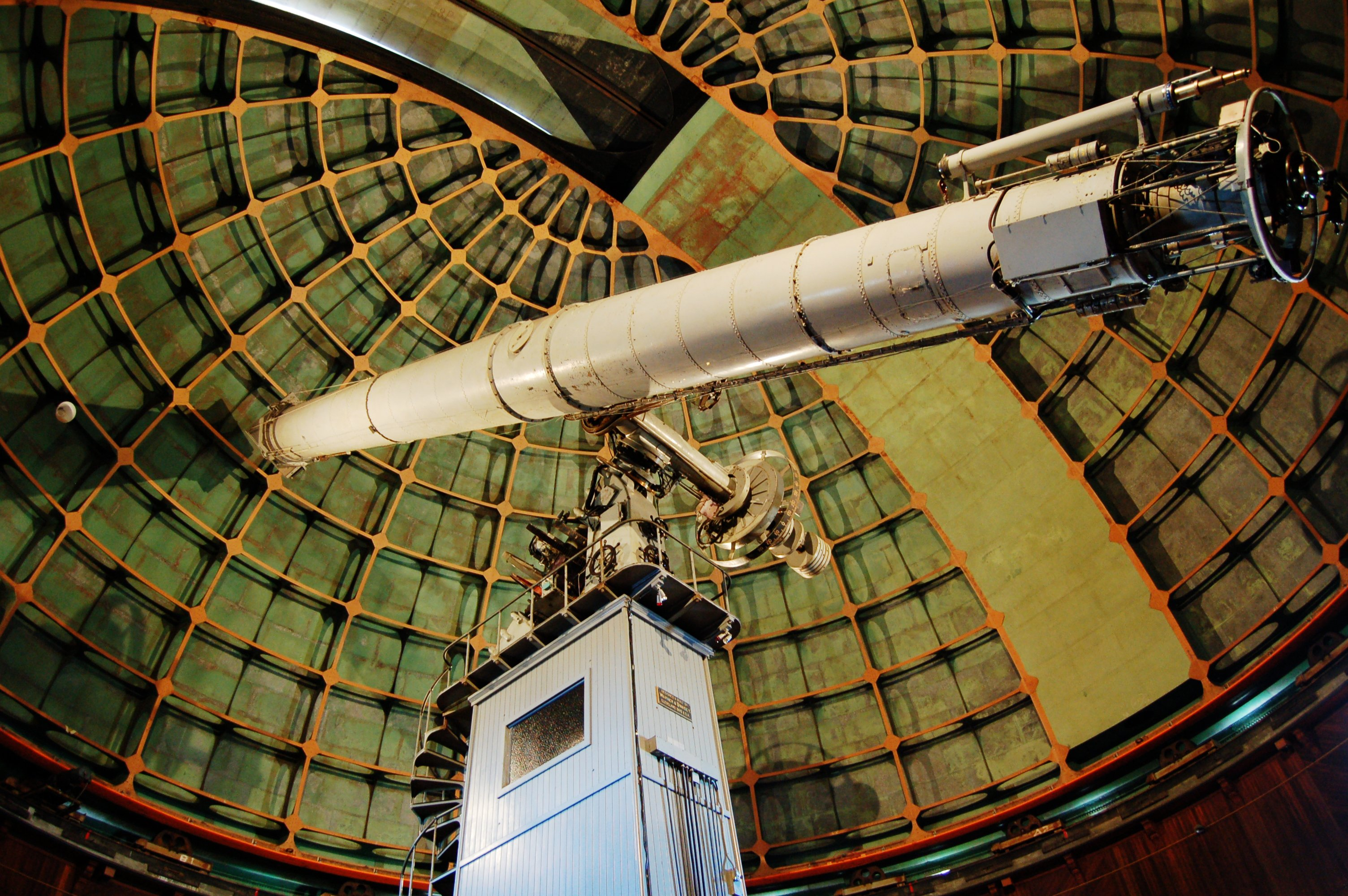
- The James Lick telescope, housed in the South (large) Dome of main building
- Alternative names: lick
- Named after: James Lick
- Organization: University of California
- Observatory code: 662
- Location: near San Jose, California
- Coordinates: 37°20′28″N 121°38′35″W
- Altitude: 1,283 m (4,209 ft)
- Website: ucolick.org/main/
- Telescopes: Lick Observatory Main Building; Anna L. Nickel telescope; Automated Planet Finder; C. Donald Shane Telescope; Carnegie telescope; Coudé Auxiliary Telescope; Crossley telescope; James Lick telescope; Katzman Automatic Imaging Telescope; Tauchmann telescope
- Related media on Commons

The Lick Observatory is an astronomical observatory owned and operated by the University of California. It is on the summit of Mount Hamilton, in the Diablo Range just east of San Jose, California, United States. The observatory is managed by the University of California Observatories, with headquarters on the University of California, Santa Cruz, campus, where its scientific staff moved in the mid-1960s. It is named after James Lick, who donated the funds for its construction.

The first new moon of Jupiter to be identified since the time of Galileo, Amalthea, the planet's fifth moon, was discovered at this observatory in 1892.

== Early history ==
Lick Observatory is the world's first permanently occupied mountain-top observatory. The observatory, in a Classical Revival style structure, was constructed between 1876 and 1887, from a bequest from James Lick of $700,000, equivalent to $25,100,000 in 2025. Lick, originally a carpenter and piano maker, had arrived from Peru in San Francisco, California, in late 1847; after accruing significant wealth he began making various donations in 1873. In his last deed he chose the site atop Mount Hamilton, and was buried there in 1887 under the future site of the telescope, with a brass tablet bearing the inscription, "Here lies the body of James Lick".

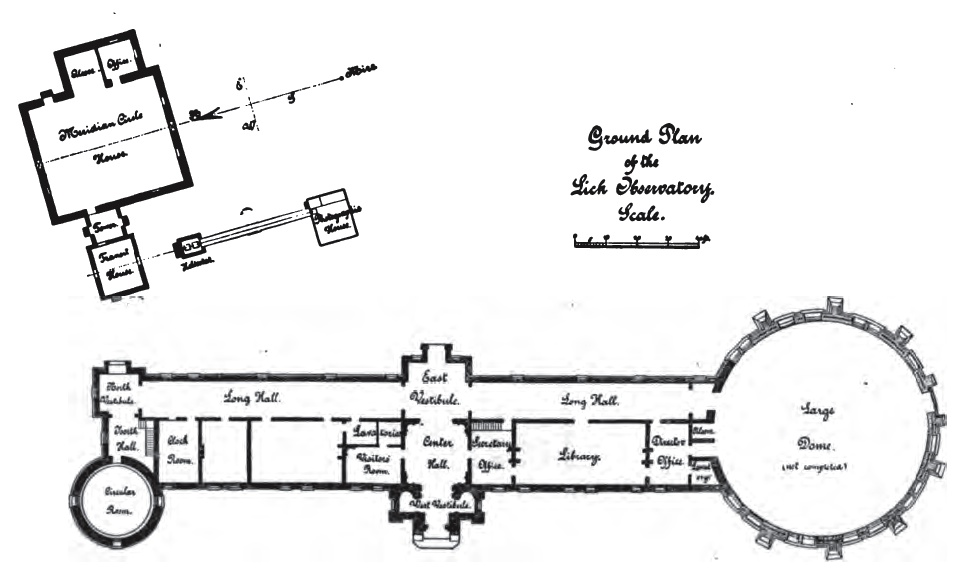
Layout of Lick Observatory. The dome housing the 91-centimeter (36-inch) Great Lick refractor telescope is on the right.

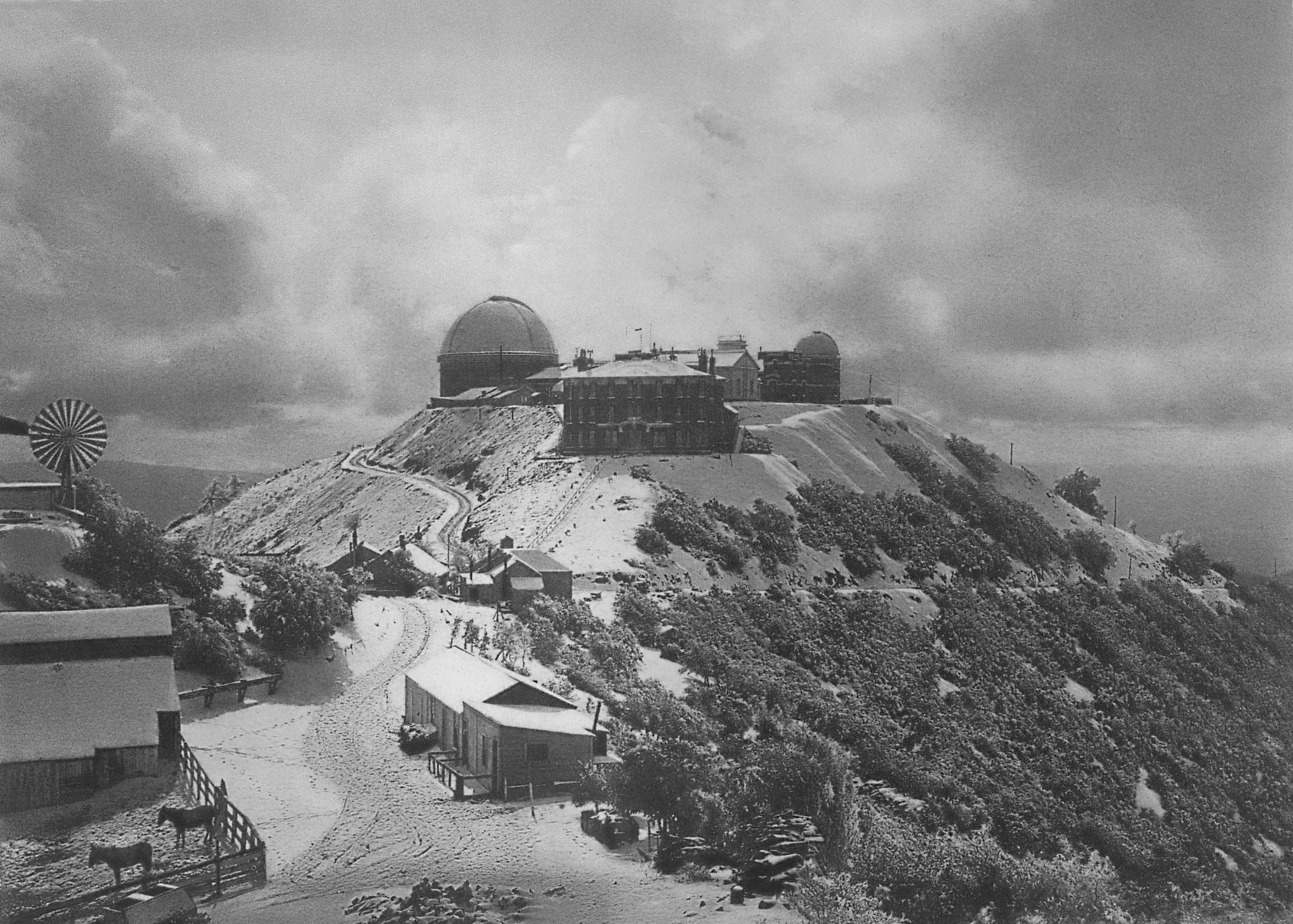
Lick Observatory in 1900

Lick additionally negotiated that Santa Clara County construct a "first-class road" to the summit, completed in 1876. Lick chose John Wright of San Francisco's Wright & Sanders firm of architects to design both the Observatory and the Astronomer's House. All of the construction materials had to be brought to the site by horse and mule-drawn wagons, which could not negotiate a steep grade. To keep the grade below 6.5%, the road had to take a very winding and sinuous path, which the modern-day road (California State Route 130) still follows. The road from Smith Creek to the summit makes 367 complete turns, in a distance of seven miles. The road is closed when there is snow.

The first telescope installed at the observatory was a 12-inch (300-millimeter) refractor made by Alvan Clark. Astronomer Edward Emerson Barnard used the telescope to make "exquisite photographs of comets and nebulae", according to D. J. Warner of Warner & Swasey Company.

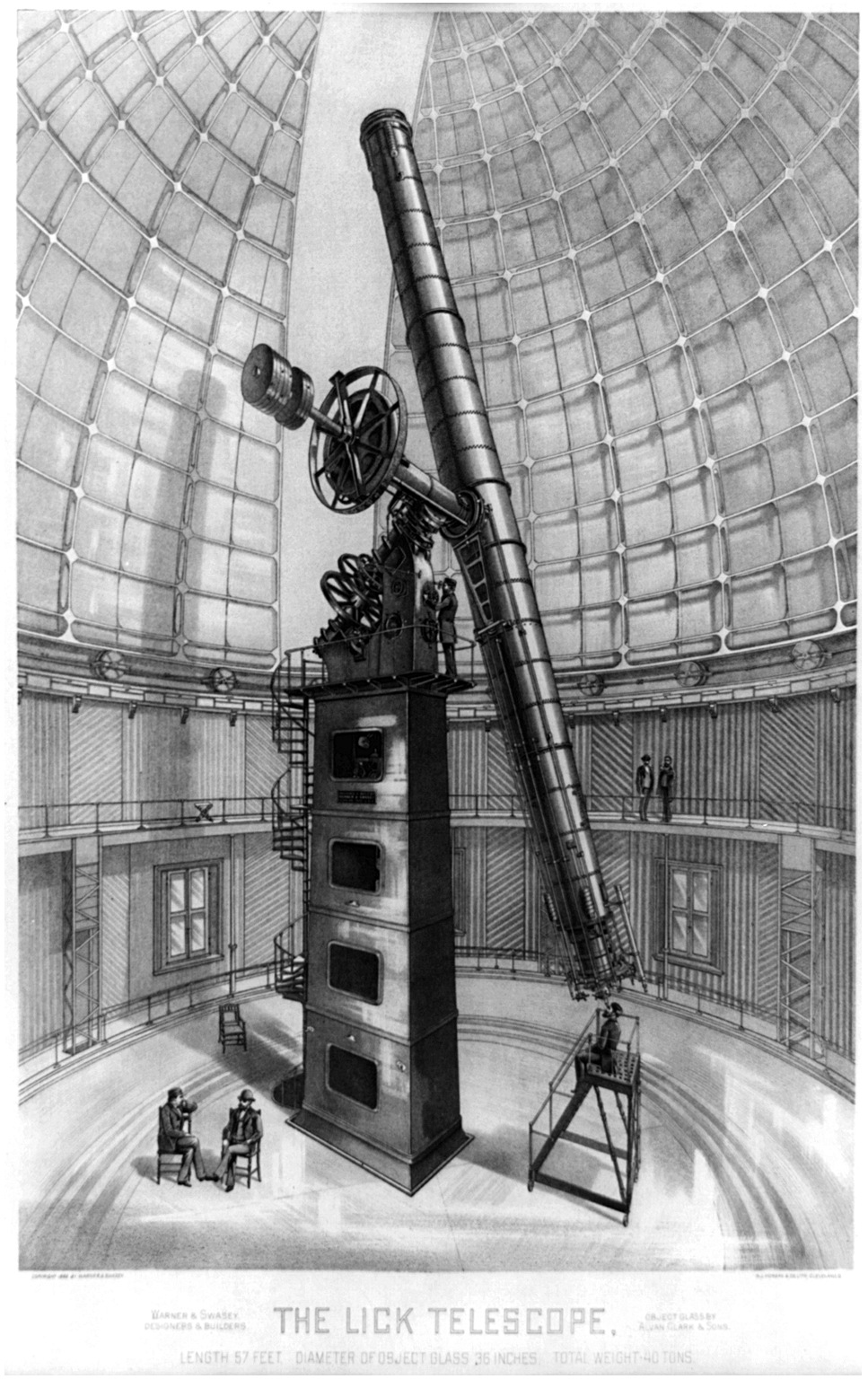
The Great Lick 91-centimeter (36-inch) refractor, in an 1889 engraving

In 1880, a 36-inch (91-centimeter) lens was commissioned to Alvan Clark & Sons, for $51,000 (equivalent to $1,700,000 in 2025). Manufacturing of the lens took until 1885 and it was delivered to the observatory on December 29, 1886. Warner & Swasey Company designed and built the telescope mounting. The telescope, built with this lens, became the world's largest refracting telescope from when it saw first light on January 3, 1888, until the construction of Yerkes Observatory in 1897.

=== Under the University of California ===
In May 1888, the observatory was turned over to the Regents of the University of California, and it became the first permanently occupied mountain-top observatory in the world. Edward S. Holden was the first director. The location provided excellent viewing performance because of lack of ambient light and pollution; additionally, the night air at the top of Mt. Hamilton is extremely calm. Often a layer of low coastal clouds invades the valley below, especially on nights from late spring to midsummer, a phenomenon known in California as the June Gloom. On nights when the observatory remains above that layer, light pollution can be greatly reduced.

E. E. Barnard used the telescope in 1892 to discover a fifth moon of Jupiter, Amalthea. This was the first addition to Jupiter's known moons since Galileo Galilei observed the planet through his parchment tube and spectacle lens. The telescope provided spectra for W. W. Campbell's work on the radial velocities of stars.

B/W photograph of the Meridian Instrument, at Lick Observatory, Mount Hamilton, near San Jose, California. Circa 1888.

In 1905 (Jan. 5 and Feb. 27), Charles Dillon Perrine discovered the sixth and seventh moons of Jupiter (Elara and Himalia) on photographs taken with the 36-inch Crossley reflecting telescope which he had recently rebuilt.

On August 7, 1921, an unusually bright mysterious astronomical object was seen from the observatory only about three degrees from the Sun, where recent analysis in 2016 concluded that this is highly likely a comet.

In 1928, Donald C. Shane studied carbon stars, and was able to distinguish them into spectral classes R0–R9 and N0–N7 (on this scale N7 is the reddest and R0 the bluest). This was an expansion of Annie Jump Cannon of Harvard's work on carbon stars that had divided them into R and N types. The N stars have more cyanogen and the R stars have more carbon.

On May 21, 1939, during a nighttime fog that engulfed the summit, a U.S. Army Air Force Northrop A-17 two-seater attack plane crashed into the main building. Because a scientific meeting was being held elsewhere, the only staff member present was Nicholas U. Mayall. Nothing caught fire and the two individuals in the building were unharmed.

The pilot of the plane, Lt. Richard F. Lorenz, and passenger Private W. E. Scott were killed instantly. The telephone line was broken by the crash, so no help could be called for at first. Eventually help arrived together with numerous reporters and photographers, who kept arriving almost all night long. Evidence of their numbers could be seen the next day by the litter of flash bulbs carpeting the parking lot.

The press widely covered the accident and many reports emphasized the luck in not losing a large cabinet of spectrograms that was knocked over by the crash coming through an astronomer's office window. There was no damage to the telescope dome.

In 1950, the California State Legislature appropriated funds for a 120-inch (300-centimeter) reflecting telescope, which was completed in 1959. The observatory additionally has a 24-inch (61-centimeter) Cassegrain reflector dedicated to photoelectric measurements of star brightness, and received a pair of 20-inch (51-centimeter) astrographs from the Carnegie Corporation of New York.

== Time-signal service ==
In 1886, Lick Observatory began supplying Railroad Standard Time to the Southern Pacific Railroad, and to other businesses, over telegraph lines. The signal was generated by a clock manufactured by E. Howard & Co. specifically for the Observatory, and which included an electric apparatus for transmitting the time signal over telegraph lines. While most of the nation's railroads received their time signal from the U.S. Naval Observatory time signal via Western Union's telegraph lines, the Lick Observatory time signal was used by railroads from the West Coast all the way to Colorado.

== 21st century ==
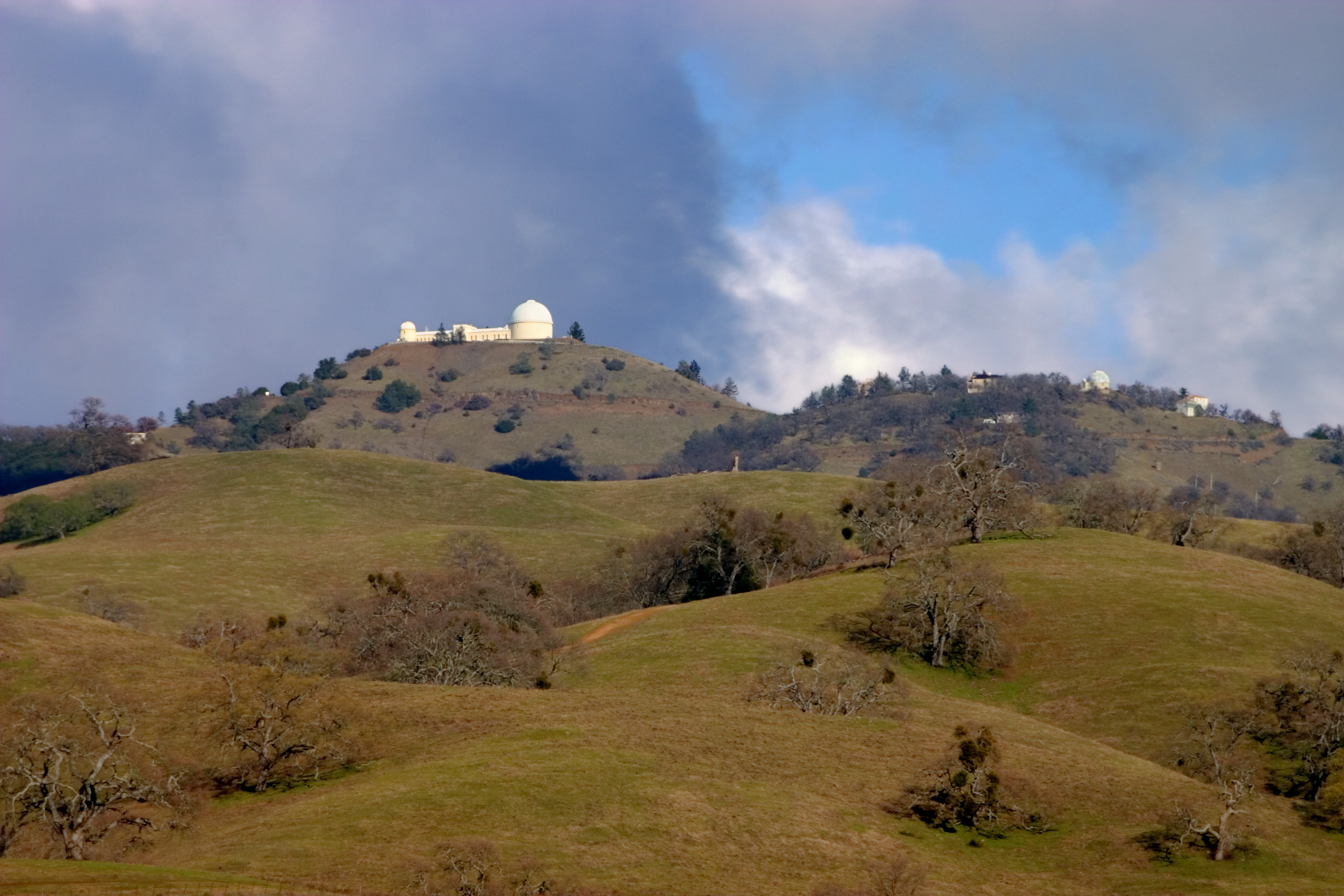
Lick Observatory from Joseph D. Grant County Park

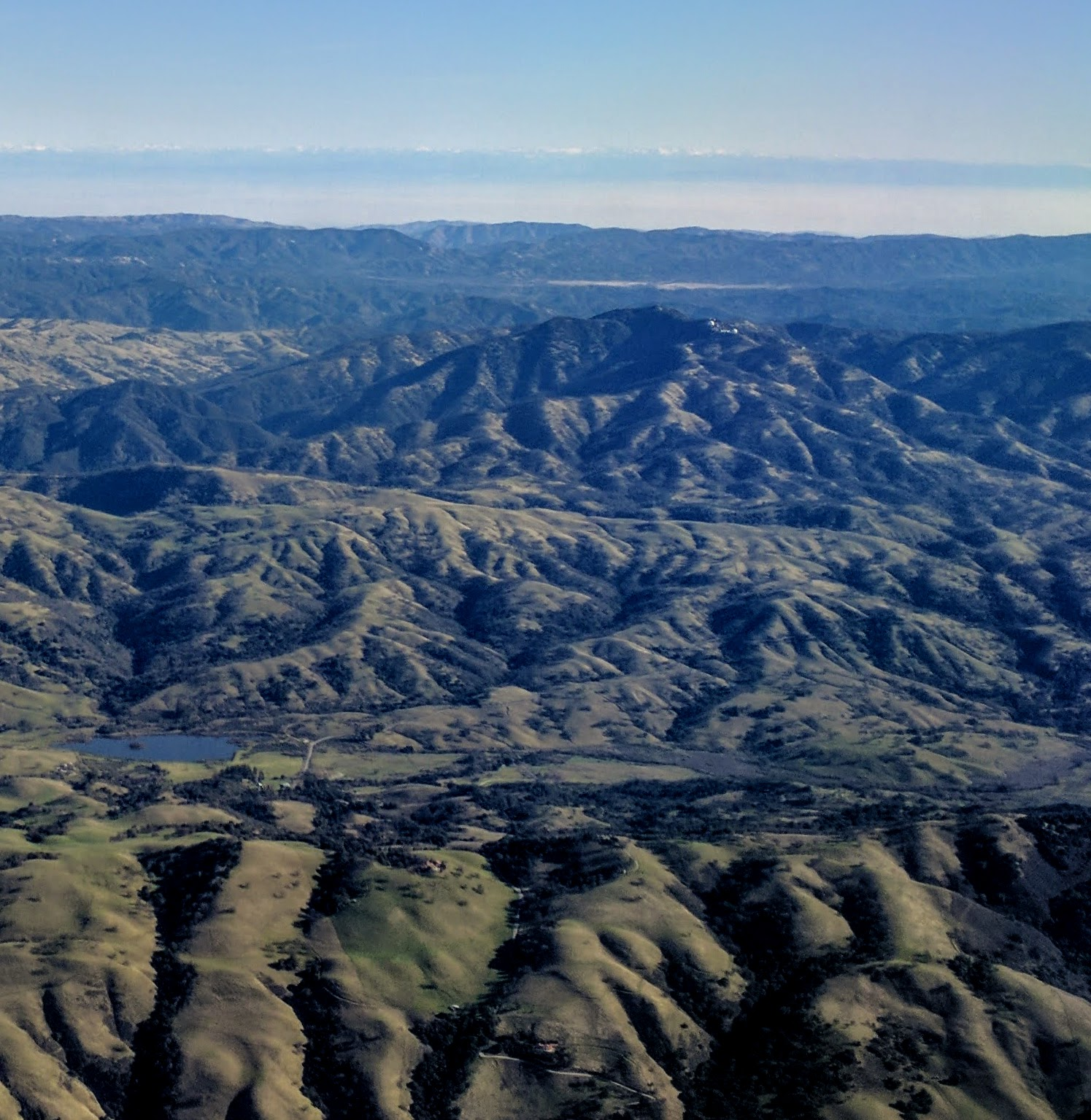
Aerial view of Lick Observatory and Mount Hamilton, looking east after takeoff from Norman Y. Mineta San Jose International Airport

With the growth of San Jose, and the rest of Silicon Valley, light pollution became a problem for the observatory. In the 1970s, a site in the Santa Lucia Range at Junípero Serra Peak, southeast of Monterey, was evaluated for possible relocation of many of the telescopes. However, funding for the move was not available, and in 1980 San Jose began a program to reduce the effects of lighting, most notably replacing all streetlamps with low-pressure sodium-vapor lamps. The result is that the Mount Hamilton site remains a viable location for a major working observatory.

The International Astronomical Union named Asteroid 6216 San Jose to honor the city's efforts toward reducing light pollution.

In 2006, there were 23 families in residence, plus typically between two and ten visiting astronomers from the University of California campuses, who stay in dormitories while working at the observatory. The little town of Mount Hamilton atop the mountain has a post office, at one point had its own police, and until 2005 had a one-room K-8 school.

By 2013, it was common for the observers to work from remote observing stations rather than make the drive, partly as a result of the business office raising the cost to stay in the dormitories. The swimming pool has been closed.

In 2013, one of Lick Observatory's key funding sources was scheduled for elimination in 2018, which many worried would result in the closing of the entire observatory.

In November 2014, the University of California announced its intention to continue support of Lick Observatory.

Telescopes at Lick Observatory are used by researchers from many campuses of the University of California system. Topics of research carried out at Lick include exoplanets, supernovae, active galactic nuclei, planetary science, and development of new adaptive optics technologies.

In 2015, Google donated $1 million to the observatory over two years.

In August 2020, the observatory was in danger of being destroyed by the rapidly growing SCU Lightning Complex fires. Firefighters were on standby at Lick Observatory to defend the buildings if necessary. As of the evening of August 19, 2020, the fire was on observatory property and moving quickly. While the residences on Mt. Hamilton sustained some damage during the following night, the telescopes and domes survived.

In the early hours of 25 December 2025 strong winds of 100 miles per hour (160 km/h) with gusts up to 114 miles per hour (183 km/h) damaged the Great Refractor dome, tearing off half the shutter. The telescope was not damaged, however.

== Significant discoveries ==
The following astronomical objects were discovered at Lick Observatory:

- Measurement of the size of the major moons of Jupiter by Albert A. Michelson in 1891
- Several moons of Jupiter
  - Amalthea
  - Elara
  - Himalia
  - Sinope
- Near-Earth asteroid (29075) 1950 DA
- Several extrasolar planets
  - Quintuple planet system
    - 55 Cancri
  - Triple planet system
    - Upsilon Andromedae (with Fred Lawrence Whipple Observatory)
  - Double planet systems
    - HD 38529 (with W. M. Keck Observatory)
    - HD 12661 (with Keck)
    - Gliese 876 (with Keck)
    - 47 Ursae Majoris
- The first detection of spectral lines in the spectrum of an active galaxy
- The jet emerging from the active nucleus in Messier 87
- The hidden active galactic nucleus in NGC 1068, detected using spectropolarimetry

In addition to observations of natural phenomena, Lick was also the location of the first laser range-finding observation of the Apollo 11 reflector, although this was only for confirmation purposes and no ongoing range-finding work was performed.

== Equipment ==
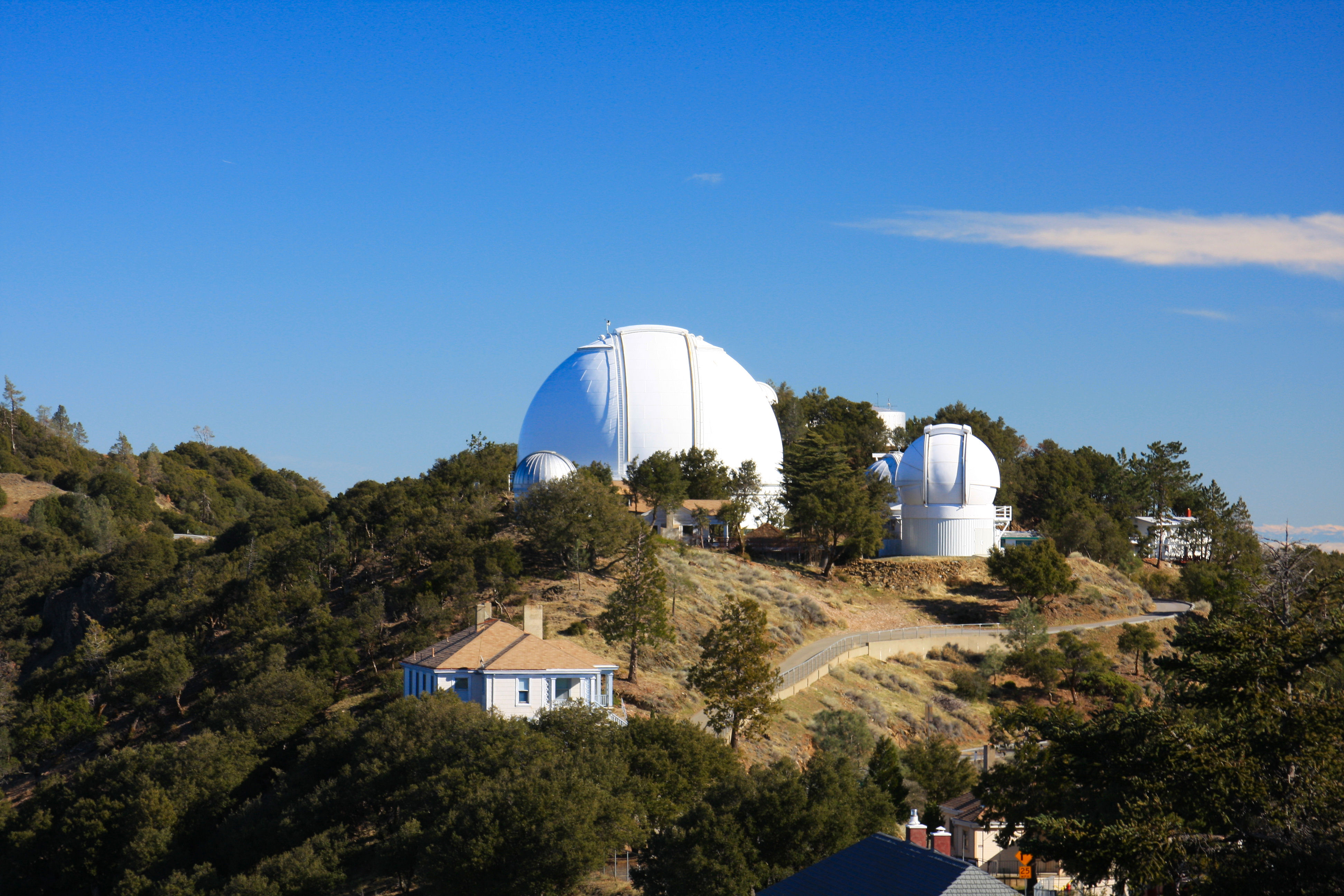
Lick Observatory's Shane 120-inch (3-meter) telescope (center) along with the nearby Automated Planet Finder 100-inch (250-centimeter) reflector

Below is a list of the nine telescopes currently operating at the observatory:

- The C. Donald Shane telescope 120-inch (3-meter) reflector (Shane Dome, Tycho Brahe Peak). Its instrumentation includes:
  - The Hamilton spectrometer
  - The Kast double spectrograph
  - The ShaneAO adaptive optics system with laser guide star
- The Automated Planet Finder 94-inch (2.4-meter) reflector. First light was originally scheduled for 2006. The telescope finally came into regular use in 2013.
- The Anna L. Nickel 39-inch (1-meter) reflector (North (small) Dome, Main Building)
- The Great Lick 36-inch (91-centimeter) refractor (South Dome, Main Building, Observatory Peak)
- The Crossley 35-inch (90-centimeter) reflector (Crossley Dome, Ptolemy Peak)
- The Katzman Automatic Imaging Telescope (KAIT) 30-inch (76-centimeter) reflector (24-inch Dome, Kepler Peak)
- The 24-inch (60-centimeter) Coudé Auxiliary Telescope (Inside of Shane Dome, South wall, Tycho Brahe Peak)
- The Tauchmann 20-inch (50-centimeter) reflector (Tauchmann Dome atop the water tank, Huygens Peak)
- The Carnegie 20-inch (50-centimeter) twin refractor (Double Astrograph Dome, Tycho Brahe Peak)

Below is a list of equipment that formerly operated at the observatory:

- CCD Comet Camera 135-millimeter (5.3-inch) Nikon camera lens ("The Outhouse" Southwest of the Shane Dome, Tycho Brahe Peak)

== See also ==
- Charles Dillon Perrine
- Harland Epps
- List of astronomical observatories
- List of largest optical refracting telescopes
