= Lick Object of 1921 =

Lost comet

X/1921 P1 (Lick)
Discovery
- Discovered by: William W. Campbell
- Discovery site: Lick Observatory
- Discovery date: 7 August 1921

Orbital characteristics
- Observation arc: 1 day
- Perihelion: ~0.25 AU

Physical characteristics
- Apparent magnitude: –2.0 (1921 apparition)

The Lick Object of 1921 is an unidentified astronomical object that was observed from the Lick Observatory in August 1921. Although follow-up observations were not successfully conducted, it is hypothesized that this object is highly likely a non-periodic comet.

== Observational history ==
William Wallace Campbell reported the sighting of a star-like object about three degrees from the Sun on the evening of 7 August 1921. Observers noted that the object was as bright as Venus, reaching an apparent magnitude of –2 at its maximum. A possibility that it was a nova explosion was ruled out due to its high relative position (about 40 degrees) to the Galactic plane. (Note: Reported initial position upon discovery was: α = 9^{h} 22^{m} , δ = 15.5°)

Zdenek Sekanina and Rainer Kracht published a study in 2016 where they concluded that the Lick object is highly likely a fragment of the same parent body as the comet C/1847 C1 (Hind). Their findings suggested that the Lick Object and C/1847 C1 split from a parent body sometime during their perihelion on the 7th millennium BC at a relative velocity of ~1.0–1.5 m/s (3.3–4.9 ft/s).
