= Eppes =

Eppes may refer to:

== People ==
- Francis W. Eppes (1801–1881), American planter, slave owner and civic leader
- Henry Eppes (1830/31–1903), African-American politician
- John Wayles Eppes (1772–1823), American lawyer and politician
- Mary Jefferson Eppes (1778–1804), younger of Thomas Jefferson's two daughters who survived infancy
- Richard Eppes (1824–1896), American planter and surgeon
- T. J. Eppes, American cotton planter and politician, President of the Florida Senate in 1860 and 1861

== Fictional characters ==
- Alan Eppes, a character on the television show Numb3rs, the father of Charlie and Don
- Charlie Eppes, a protagonist in the television program Numb3rs
- Don Eppes, a protagonist in the television show Numb3rs

== Places ==
- Eppes, Aisne, a commune in France
- Eppes Island, Virginia, United States
- Francis Eppes Plantation, Florida, United States

== See also ==
- Epps (disambiguation)
