= Tauchmann telescope =

Telescope in California

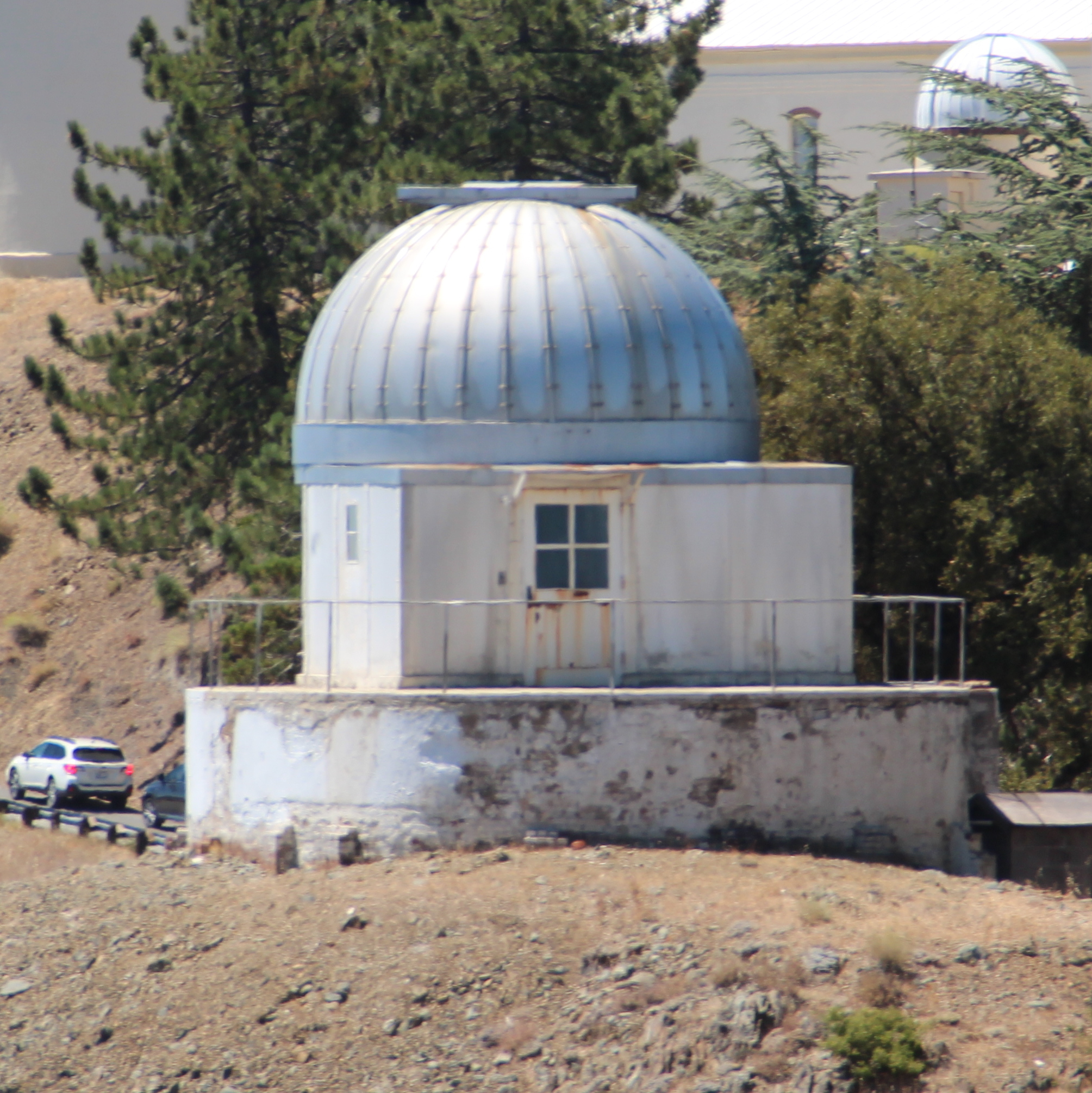
- Tauchmann telescope dome
- Location(s): Santa Clara County, California, Pacific States Region
- Coordinates: 37°20′31″N 121°38′25″W
- Diameter: 0.5 m (1 ft 8 in)
- Location of Tauchmann telescope
- Related media on Commons

Tauchmann telescope is a 0.5 m (22-inch) reflector atop the water tank at Huyghens Peak. It is part of the Lick Observatory at Mount Hamilton.

The telescope has been constructed by George Tauchmann, an amateur astronomer from Berkeley, California. In 1937 it was the biggest amateur reflecting telescope in the world. Lick Observatory purchased the telescope in 1950.
