= Point Ellice House =

Historic site in British Columbia, Canada

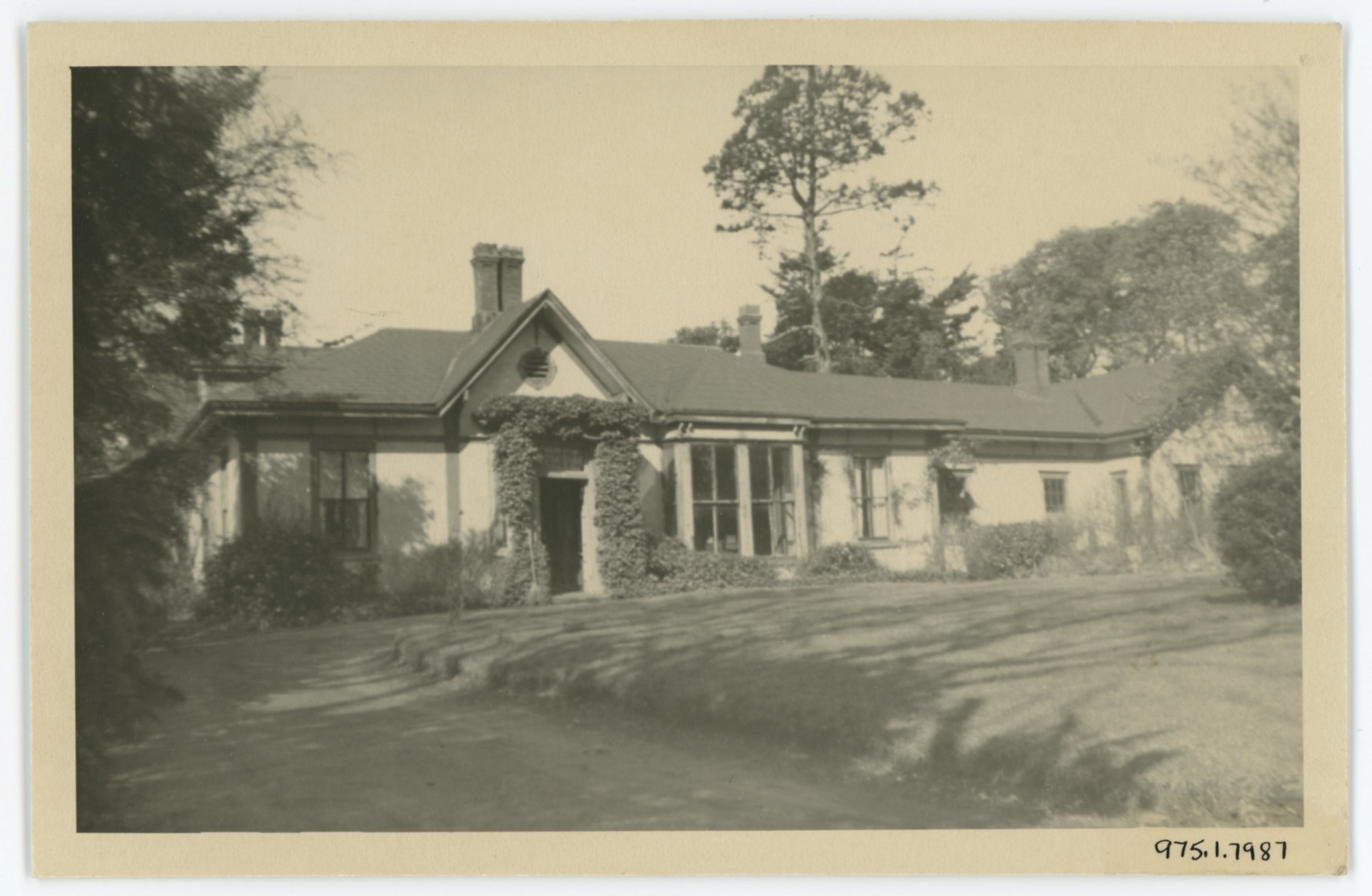
- historic black and white photograph of Point Ellice House.
- Interactive map of Point Ellice House
- Type: Historic house
- Location: 2616 Pleasant Street; Victoria, British Columbia
- Coordinates: 48.4361°N 123.3772°W
- Built: 1861–1864
- Built for: Charles Wallace
- Architect: Wright & Sanders
- Architectural style: Italianate
- Governing body: Métis Nation British Columbia
- Website: pointellicehouse.com

National Historic Site of Canada
- Official name: Point Ellice House / O'Reilly House National Historic Site of Canada
- Designated: 26 October 1966
- Reference no.: 101

Point Ellice House is located in the Burnside-Gorge neighbourhood of Victoria, British Columbia, Canada. Point Ellice House was designated a National Historic Site in 1966 and became a Provincial Historic Site in 1975. The house is also listed on the City of Victoria's heritage registry. The site is under the management of the Métis Nation British Columbia.

== History ==
=== Wentworth Wallace family ===
Positioned overlooking Selkirk Water/Gorge Waterway, Point Ellice House is among the oldest homes in Victoria and was constructed between 1861 and 1862 for Catherine (née Work) Wallace and Charles Wentworth Wallace. To build the home, Catherine's father, John Work, sold his daughter and son-in-law a two-acre parcel from his estate for $100. Charles was invested in many business ventures in Victoria and British Columbia. By 1866 he was bankrupt, forcing the family to depart from Point Ellice House to pay off debts

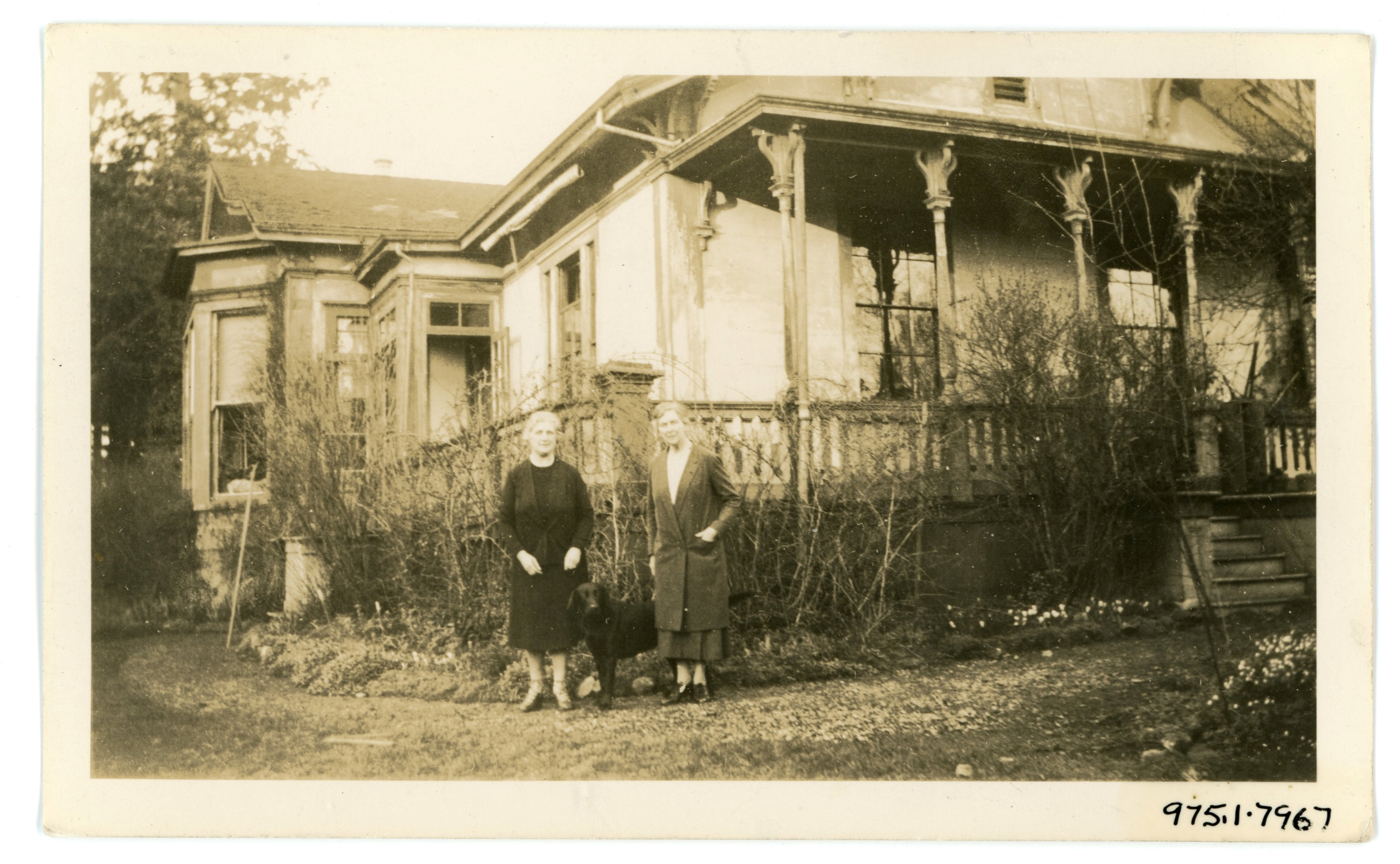
Mary Windham O'Reilly and Kathleen O'Reilly on the back lawn of Point Ellice House

=== O'Reilly family ===
The O'Reilly family lived at Point Ellice House from 1867 until 1975 when the remaining O'Reilly's sold the historic house, the land, and the collection of household ephemera to the province of British Columbia.

Peter O'Reilly and his wife Caroline O'Reilly (née Trutch) moved into Point Ellice House December, 1867 with their infant son, Francis (Frank) Joseph O'Reilly. Weeks later, their eldest daughter, Charlotte Kathleen O'Reilly, would be born. The couple would have two more children, both born at Point Ellice House: Arthur John "Jack" O'Reilly (born in 1873) and Mary Augusta O'Reilly (born 1869).

Peter's employment as Gold Commissioner, Judge, and Indian Reserve Commissioner gave him the financial freedom to make extensive changes to the house, including the addition of an entire wing in the late 19th century. Diaries and letters sent between family members discuss house renovations and the ongoing work of maintaining kitchen and flower gardens.

== History of Site Management ==
Point Ellice House was purchased from the O'Reilly family in 1975 by the Province of British Columbia. In 2002, the province sought to outsource the sites management to a non-profit society. A willing non-profit was not found until 2004 when the Capital Mental Health Association agreed to manage the site. In 2009, the Point Ellice House Preservation Society took over operations but was replaced by the Vancouver Island Local History Society (VILHS) in 2019. The VILHS ran the site until March 2023 but they were unable to continue, citing a lack of sustainable funding from the provincial government. In May 2023, the province contracted The Forager Foundation to act as an interim operator of the site, until a permanent organization could be found. In December 2023, it was announced that the Métis Nation British Columbia would be taking over the sites management, beginning in January 2024.

== Architecture ==
Architects Wright & Sanders chose an Italianate Villa-style design that was popular during the 19th century.

== See also ==
- List of National Historic Sites of Canada in British Columbia
- List of historic places in Victoria, British Columbia
