= Valiant Air Command Warbird Museum =

Valiant Air Command, Inc. Warbird Museum

- Location within Florida
- Established: 1977
- Location: Space Coast Regional Airport; 6600 Tico Road; Titusville, Florida
- Coordinates: 28.519°N 80.794°W
- Type: Aviation museum
- Website: Valiant Air Command Warbird Museum

The Valiant Air Command, Inc. Warbird Museum (VAC) is located at the Space Coast Regional Airport in Brevard County, just south of Titusville, Florida. The VAC contains vintage aircraft and a 30,000-square-foot (2,800 m^{2}) hangar with a restoration area. The VAC also has a Memorabilia Hall with flight gear, dress uniforms, weapons and artifacts. The collection includes fixed and rotary wing aircraft from World War I to the present. The flagship aircraft of the museum is a Douglas C-47 Skytrain called "TICO Belle" which returned to flying status in July 2009 after the aircraft was involved in an accident.

== History ==
The museum began raising money as part of a four phase plan for expansion in 2021.

Following an accident a year prior, the museum was forced to sell its damaged TBM Avenger in March 2022.

The museum opened the 20,000 sq ft (1,900 m^{2}) Lt. Cmdr. Stockton N. Smith Center on 11 October 2025.

== Aircraft on display ==
=== Aircraft on display ===
- Beechcraft RU-21A Ute
- Beechcraft T-34C Turbo Mentor
- Bell H-13 Sioux
- Bell UH-1 Iroquois
- Cessna O-2 Skymaster
- de Havilland DH.82A Tiger Moth
- Douglas TA-4J Skyhawk
- Douglas C-47A Skytrain – Airworthy - "Tico Belle"
- Douglas SBD Dauntless
- English Electric Canberra TT.18
- Epps 1907 Monoplane – Replica
- Fouga CM.170 Magister
- General Dynamics F-16A Fighting Falcon
- Grumman F-11F Tiger
- Grumman A-6 Intruder
- Grumman FM Wildcat
- Grumman F9F-5 Panther
- Grumman F-14A Tomcat
- Grumman S-2F Tracker
- Lockheed T-33
- Ling-Temco-Vought A-7A Corsair II
- McDonnell Douglas F-4J Phantom II
- McDonnell Douglas F/A-18 Hornet
- McDonnell F-101B Voodoo
- Mikoyan-Gurevich MiG-17
- Mikoyan-Gurevich MiG-21
- Nord Noralpha
- North American B-25 Mitchell
- North American F-86 Sabre
- North American F-100D Super Sabre
- North American T-2C Buckeye
- North American SNJ-5 Texan
- North American XP-82 Twin Mustang – On loan
- Piper L-4J Grasshopper
- Republic F-105 Thunderchief
- Sikorsky H-19 Chickasaw
- Sikorsky MH-53E Sea Dragon – On loan
- Northrop F-5E Shaped Sonic Boom Demonstration
- Stearman PT-17
- Stinson L-5 Sentinel
- Vought F-8K Crusader

=== Aircraft under restoration ===
- Grumman OV-1C Mohawk

== See also ==
- List of aerospace museums
