= Carnegie telescope =

Refractor telescope in California, US

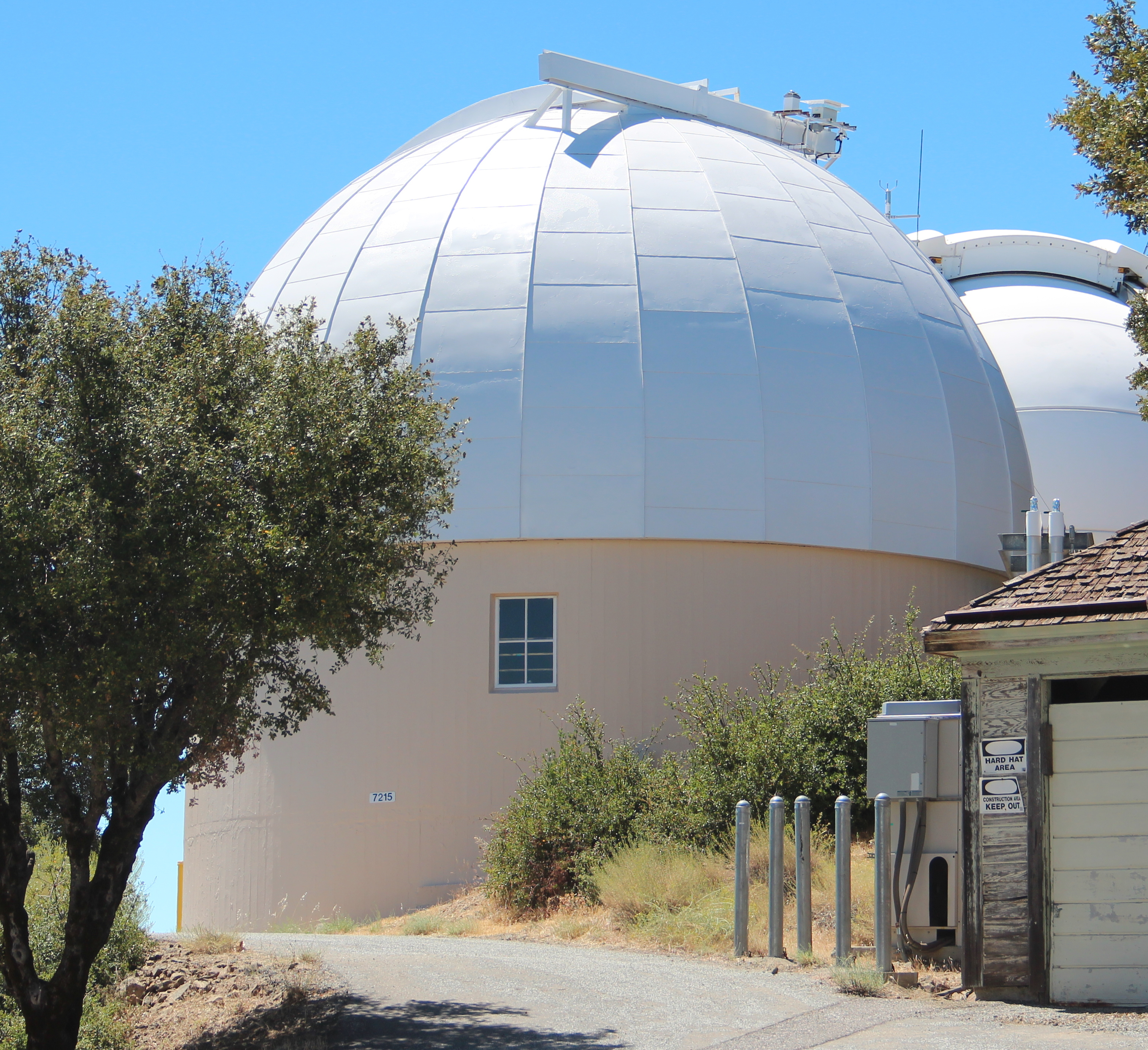
- Carnegie telescope dome
- Alternative names: Carnegie Double Astrograph
- Location(s): Santa Clara County, California, Pacific States Region
- Coordinates: 37°20′33″N 121°38′17″W
- Diameter: 20 in (0.51 m)
- Website: www.ucolick.org/public/telescopes/astrograph.html,%20https://www.ucolick.org/main/science/telescopes/carnegie.html
- Location of Carnegie telescope
- Related media on Commons

The Carnegie telescope (i.e. Carnegie double astrograph) is a twin 20-inch (510 mm) refractor telescope located at Lick Observatory in California, United States. The double telescope's construction began in the 1930s with a grant from the Carnegie institution, although it was not completed until the 1960s when a second lens was added. The telescope is not designed for visual observation, rather it has two lenses used for taking photographs for a specific wavelength recorded on a film emulsion. It was used for photographic sky surveys in the late 20th century, which were successfully completed.

The overall goal of the telescope was to study the "problem of galactic rotation and proper motion.. "

== History ==
The first survey was conducted between 1947 and 1954, using the blue-light corrected lens which was installed in 1946.

Lenses:

- Ross-Fecker lens added in 1946
  - Corrected for blue light
- Perkin-Elmer lens added in 1962
  - Corrected for yellow light, four elements

== Description ==
The double telescope is on a precision equatorial mount.

It was designed for astrophotographic surveys, and two noted results were the Shane-Wirtanen galaxy counts and the Lick Northern Proper Motion project.

The Carnegie 20-inch (510 mm) twin refractor is located in a mid-sized dome at the observatory. Because the Carnegie is actually two 20-inch (510 mm) telescopes, side by side on a single mount, it looks more like a large set of very long binoculars rather than a telescope. One side is designed to photograph blue light and the other yellow light.

The Carnegie was built expressly to measure the motions of as many stars as possible in our local area of the Milky Way. Called the Lick Proper Motion Survey, the Carnegie's mission was to photograph the entire night sky twice; once in the 1950s and again 20 years later. By comparing both sets of photographs, much was learned about the motion of stars and the structure of our galaxy. The Carnegie is not used today except when photographs of a wide area of the sky are needed.

The telescope was built by Warner & Swasey according to a design by Doctor F.E. Ross.

The second lens was not installed until 1962, and was corrected for yellow light. The second lens was manufactured by Perkin-Elmer. This lens has four elements, including two crown elements and two flint elements. The clear aperture of the first element surface is 21.5 inches and the entire lens weighs 820 pounds including all four elements. (The clear aperture of the entrance pupil is 20 inches)

== See also ==
- List of observatories
