= George Epps =

George Epps may refer to:

- George Epps (actuary) (1885–1951), British actuary and civil servant
- George Napoleon Epps (1815–1874), homeopathic practitioner and author
