= Jack Epps =

Jack Epps may refer to:

- Jack Epps (American football) (born 1963), former professional American football player
- Jack Epps Jr. (born 1949), American screenwriter, co-writer of Top Gun

== See also ==
- John Epps (1805–1869), English physician, phrenologist, homeopath and political activist
