= Marcus Epps =

Marcus Epps may refer to:

- Marcus Epps (soccer) (born 1995), American soccer midfielder
- Marcus Epps (American football) (born 1996), American football safety
