= Charles Epps =

Charles Epps may refer to:

- Charles H. Epps Jr. (born 1930), American orthopaedic surgeon
- Charles T. Epps Jr. (1944–2015), American politician in the New Jersey General Assembly

== See also ==
- Charlie Eppes, a character in the TV series Numb3rs
