= Harland Epps =

American astronomer

Harland Epps is an astronomer, known for designing effective optics for telescopes all around the world. He is also a professor at the University of California Observatories (UCO) / Lick Observatory, teaching astronomy and astrophysics.

== Education ==
Epps received his B.A. in Astronomy in 1959, from Pomona College, Claremont, California. He then moved to Wisconsin to pursue an M.S. and Ph.D. in Astronomy, from the University of Wisconsin–Madison. He earned his M.S. in 1961, and later, received his Ph.D. in 1964.

== Career ==
From 1955-1958, Epps worked as an optical technician. He worked at Davidson Optronics, Inc., West Covina, California.

From 1964-1965, Epps aided an astronomy teacher during the school year at San Diego State College, San Diego, California. Then he decided to become an assistant at the University of California, Los Angeles from 1965-1970.

Epps has been a consultant of optical designs since 1969 and continues to do so. He designs new and more effective optics for telescopes in observatories. His optics have effected more than 15 major research groups at various universities, observatories and laboratories throughout the world.

In 1970 he became an associate professor of astronomy at University of California, Los Angeles, which then ended in 1976.

He worked his way up to become an Astronomy professor at University of California, Los Angeles. He held this position from 1976-1990. Astronomer and Professor of Astronomy and Astrophysics Epps teaches Astronomy and Astrophysics at UCO/ Lick Observatory at the University of California, Santa Cruz. He entered this position in 1989 and continues to teach astronomy and astrophysics to this day.
