= Epps 1907 Monoplane =

1907 Monoplane
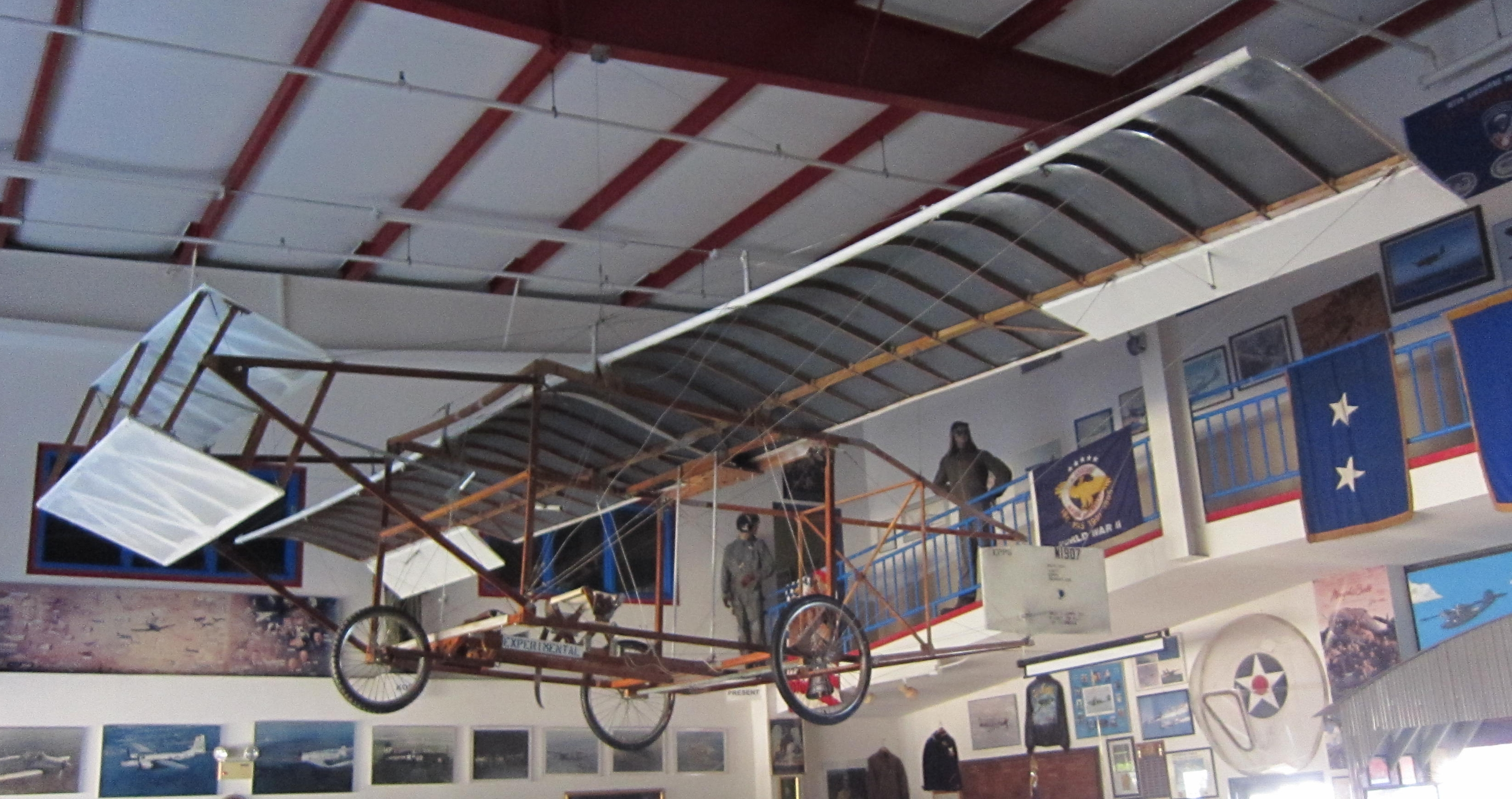
- Epps 1907 Monoplane replica at Valiant Air Command Warbird Museum.

General information
- Type: Experimental
- National origin: United States
- Designer: Ben T. Epps

History
- First flight: October 1907

The Epps 1907 Monoplane was a pioneering aircraft built and flown in 1907 by Ben T. Epps of Athens, Georgia from an original design. The aircraft consisted of an open framework suspended below a wire-braced monoplane wing. The undercarriage consisted of three bicycle wheels, one at the front of this frame, and two behind it. A buggy seat was located beneath the wing for the pilot. A 15-horsepower (11 kW) two-cylinder Anzani motorcycle engine was mounted behind the seat and drove a two-bladed propeller from an exhaust fan mounted pusher-fashion behind the wing's trailing edge. A biplane elevator unit was carried on struts at the front of the aircraft, and a single rudder on struts to its rear. The airframe was made from scrap timber collected from a sawmill, with the flying surfaces covered in cotton. Only the undersurfaces of the wings were covered.

Inspired by the Wright Brothers and pioneering European aviators, Epps first conceived of the design at the age of sixteen. In 1907, he built the aircraft in the workshop of his bicycle, electrical contracting, and automobile repair business on Washington Street, Athens.

In October 1907, he flew the machine from a cow pasture near Brooklyn Creek. After rolling downhill, Epps took off and flew around 100 yards (90 metres) at a maximum altitude of around 50 feet (15 metres). The flight ended in a crash, but made Epps Georgia's first aviator. In 1949, Lola Trammel told The Atlanta Journal Magazine that Epps had already made a successful flight in the machine prior to the public demonstration, testing the machine by moonlight with the help of friends at two o'clock in the morning.

In his 2016 book To Lasso the Clouds and his 2017 article published in Air & Space/Smithsonian, Dan A. Aldridge Jr. documents how this plane actually first flew in 1909, not 1907. The book shows how the Epps aircraft was actually the first monoplane to fly in the United States, predating the monoplane flight of Henry Walden, who was credited with the historic milestone.

The Valiant Air Command Warbird Museum in Titusville, Florida has a replica of the aircraft on display. Bearing the registration N1907, it was constructed by John D. Pruett.

== Specifications ==
Data from The Georgia Historical Society et al 2007

General characteristics

- Crew: One pilot
- Wingspan: 35 ft 0 in (10 m)
- Powerplant: 1 × 2-cylinder Anzani , 15 hp (11 kW)
