= Leonidas Epps =

American sports coach and athletics administrator (1918–1997)

Biographical details
- Born: September 5, 1918; Hope, Arkansas, U.S.
- Died: January 5, 1997 (aged 78); Atlanta, Georgia, U.S.

Playing career

Football
- c. 1940: Xavier (LA)

Basketball
- c. 1940: Xavier (LA)

Coaching career (HC unless noted)

Football
- 1945–1947: Gilbert Academy (LA) (assistant)
- 1948: Gilbert Academy (LA)
- 1949–1950: Clark (GA) (assistant)
- 1951–1969: Clark (GA)

Basketball
- 1949–1978: Clark (GA)

Administrative career (AD unless noted)
- c. 1960 – 1983: Clark (GA)

Head coaching record
- Overall: 71–72–9 (college football); 431–291 (college basketball).

Leonidas Sondric Epps Jr. (October 5, 1918 – January 5, 1997) was an American football and basketball coach, college athletics administrator, and educator. He served as the head football coach at Clark College—now known as Clark Atlanta University—from 1951 to 1969, compiling a record of 71–72–9. Epps was also the head basketball coach at Clark from 1949 to 1978, tallying a mark of 431–291.

Epps was born on October 5, 1918, in Hope, Arkansas. He grew up in East St. Louis, Illinois, where he attended East St. Louis Lincoln High School. He then went to Xavier University of Louisiana, lettering in football and basketball before graduating in 1943. After serving in the United States Army during World War II, Epps began his coaching career in 1945 as an assistant coach at Gilbert Academy in New Orleans under Jesse "Silver Fox" Blakeley. He succeeded Blakeley as head coach in 1948. Epps left Gilbert Academy a year later to become an assistant coach at Clark under Marion M. Curry. He succeeded Curry as head football coach at Clark in 1951. At the time, Epps was pursuing graduate studies at Wayne University—now known as Wayne State University—in Detroit.

Epps also served as athletic director at Clark for more than 20 years, until 1983. He died of pneumonia, on January 5, 1997, at Southwest Atlanta Hospital in Atlanta.

== Head coaching record ==
=== College football ===
Year	Team	Overall	Conference	Standing	Bowl/playoffs
Clark Panthers (Southern Intercollegiate Athletic Conference) (1951–1969)
1951	Clark	3–5	3–5		
1952	Clark	3–5	3–5		
1953	Clark	5–3	5–3	T–5th	
1954	Clark	1–7	1–7	13th	
1955	Clark	2–5–1	2–5–1	10th	
1956	Clark	4–4	3–4	7th	
1957	Clark	5–2	4–2	T–5th	
1958	Clark	4–4	3–4	7th	
1959	Clark	5–1–2	3–1–2	3rd	
1960	Clark	2–5–1	1–3–1	11th	
1961	Clark	3–3–2	2–3–1	10th	
1962	Clark	6–1	5–1	4th	
1963	Clark	7–1			
1964	Clark	3–4			
1965	Clark	2–6–1			
1966	Clark	5–3			
1967	Clark	3–4–1			
1968	Clark	4–5	3–4	5th (Division II)	
1969	Clark	4–4–1	4–3–1	3rd (Division II)	
Clark:		71–72–9			
Total:		71–72–9			
