= Harold T. Epps Sr. =

American lawyer

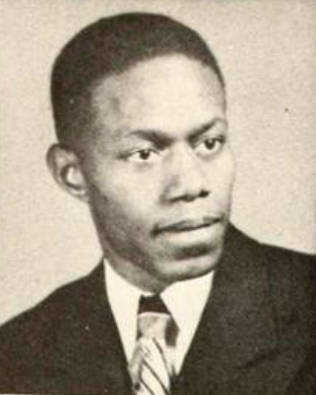
Harold T. Epps Sr.

Harold T. Epps Sr. was a prominent attorney in North Carolina who was instrumental in desegregating the University of North Carolina at Chapel Hill School of Law.

== Early life and education ==
Harold T. Epps Sr., a native of Asheville, N.C., obtained a bachelor's degree in business administration in 1948 from the North Carolina College at Durham later named North Carolina Central University (NCCU). During his time at NCCU he was active in campus life serving as senior class president, editor-in-chief of the Maroon and Gray yearbook and as a member of the Gamma Beta chapter of Alpha Phi Alpha fraternity, among other activities.

On October 25, 1949, Epps and Robert D. Glass, then law students at NCCU, filed a lawsuit seeking admission to the University of North Carolina at Chapel Hill School of Law. The suit was filed after both Epps and Glass applied to the law school but were denied admission. Epps obtained a law degree from NCCU School of Law in 1950 preceding the final court judgment in the case.

== Career ==
Harold T. Epps Sr. was a prominent attorney in North Carolina. He established a successful criminal law and civil rights practice where he played an important role in integrating the Asheville City School System. Epps was well known for his work to increase African American voter registration and maintaining civil rights and racial equality for the African American community.

== Personal life ==
Harold T. Epps Sr. married Wilma Vestal Epps in October 1951, and from that union three children were born: Harold Jr., Marguerite, and Jannifer. In the fall of 1962, after stringent requests of Epps and his wife, their three children were granted enrollment into Claxton Elementary School.

Epps died in November 1962.
