= Wright & Sanders =

19th-century American architectural firm

Practice information
- Partners: John Wright FAIA, George H. Sanders FAIA
- Founders: John Wright
- Founded: 1858
- Dissolved: c. 1906
- Location: Victoria, British Columbia; San Francisco

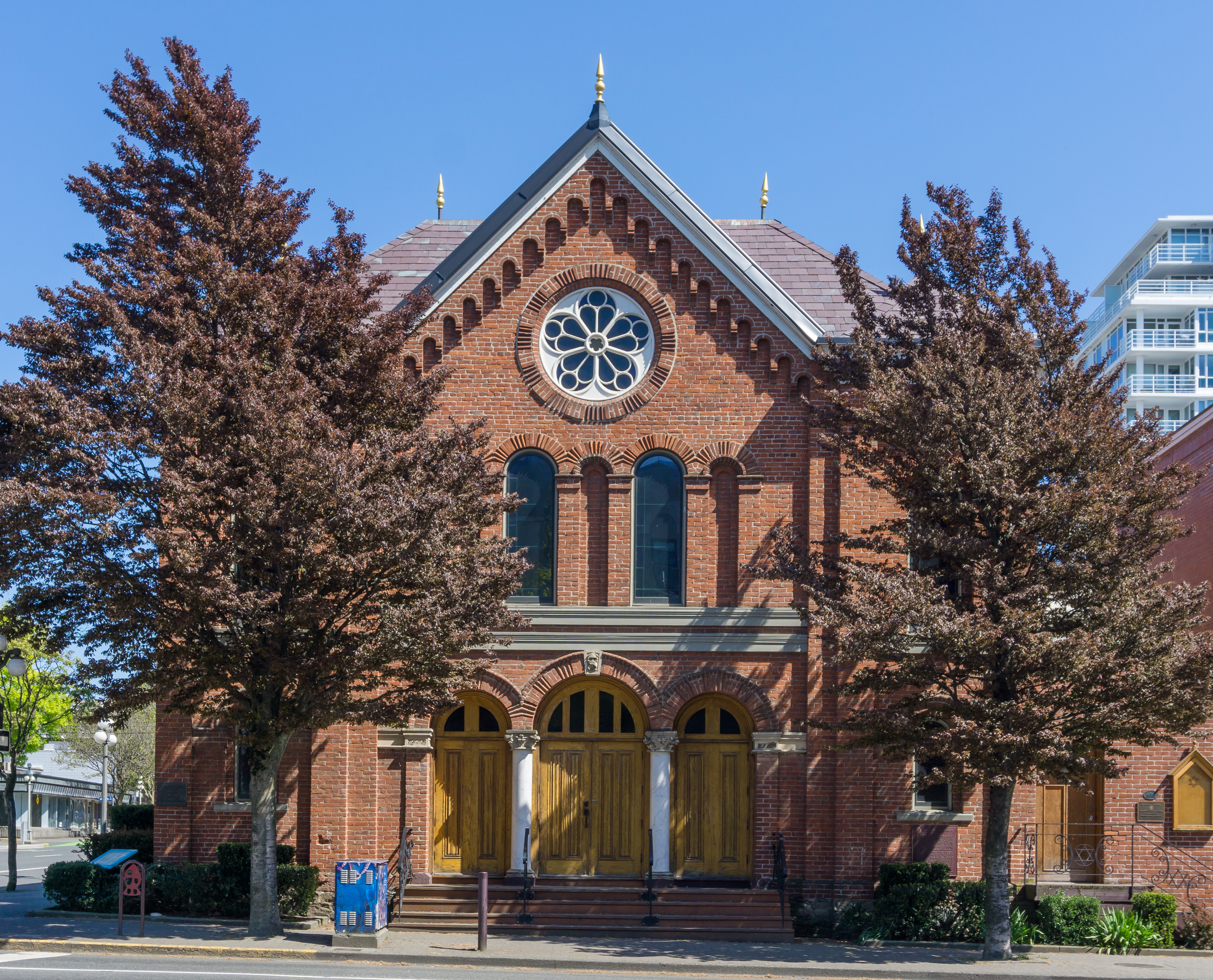
Congregation Emanu-El in Victoria, British Columbia, designed by Wright & Sanders in the Rundbogenstil and completed in 1863.

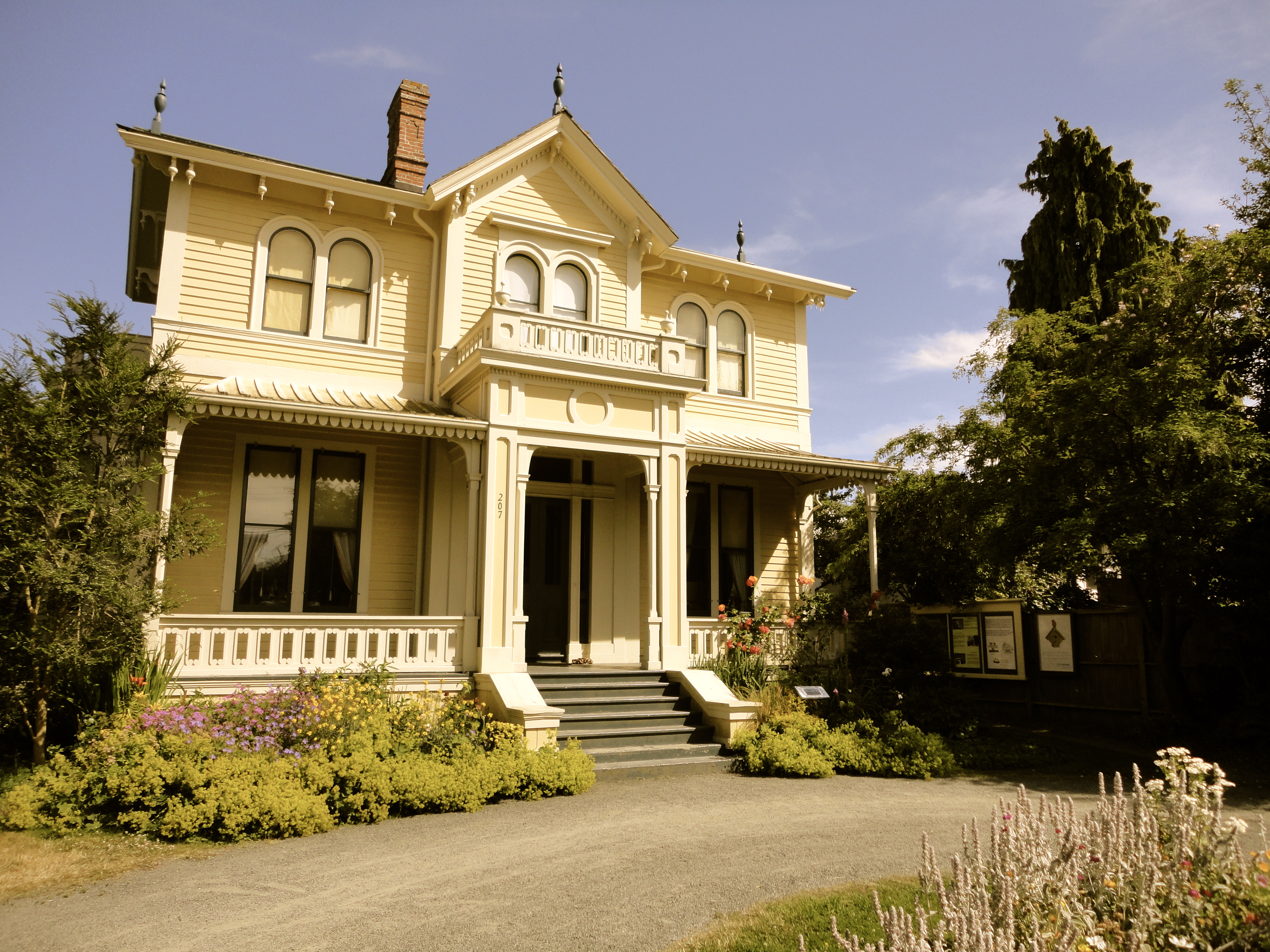
The Emily Carr House in Victoria, designed by Wright & Sanders in the Italianate style and completed in 1863.

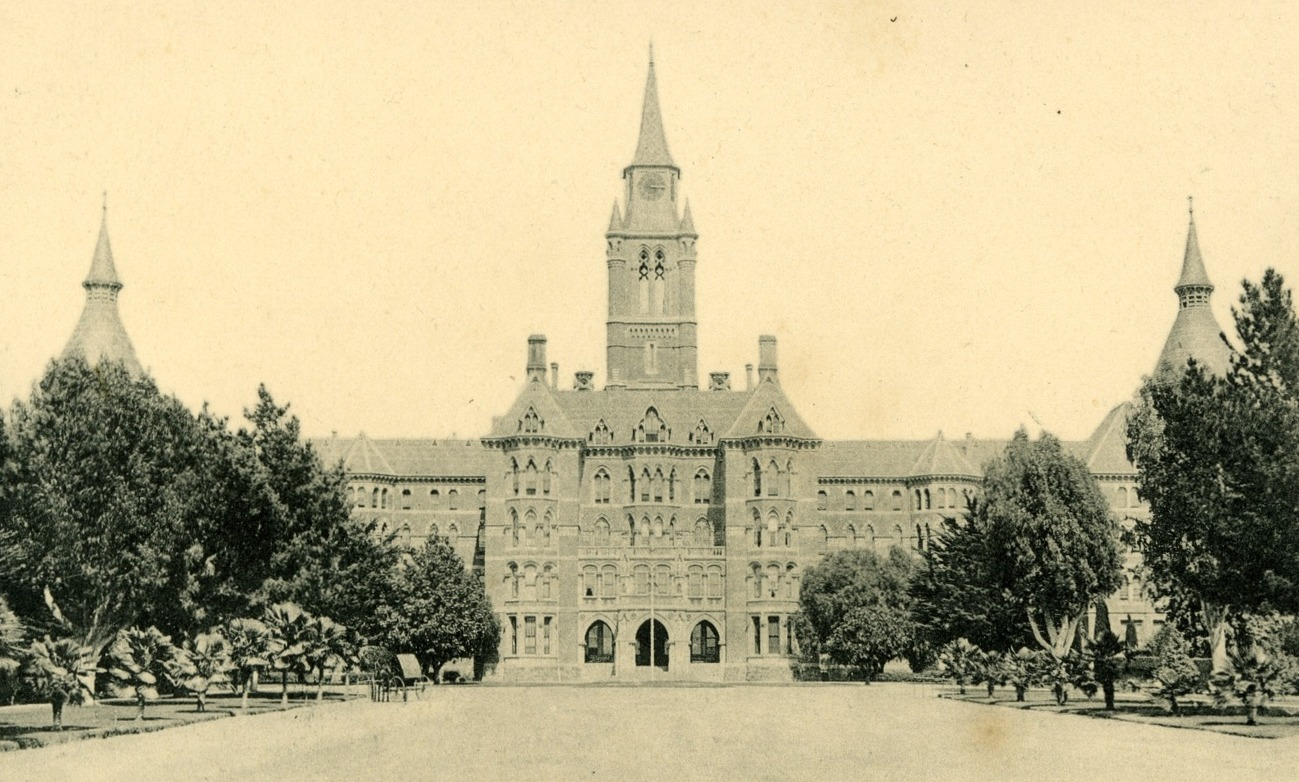
The former Napa State Hospital, designed by Wright & Sanders in the High Victorian Gothic style and completed in 1875.

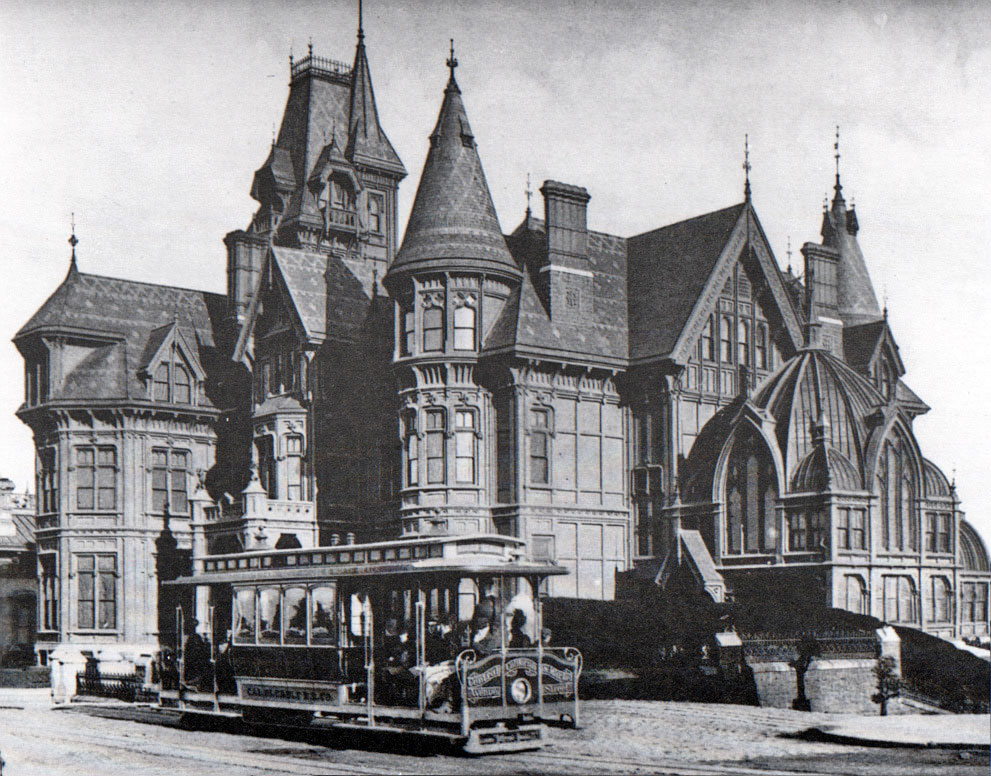
The former mansion of Mark Hopkins Jr. in San Francisco, designed by Wright & Sanders in the Stick style and completed in 1878.

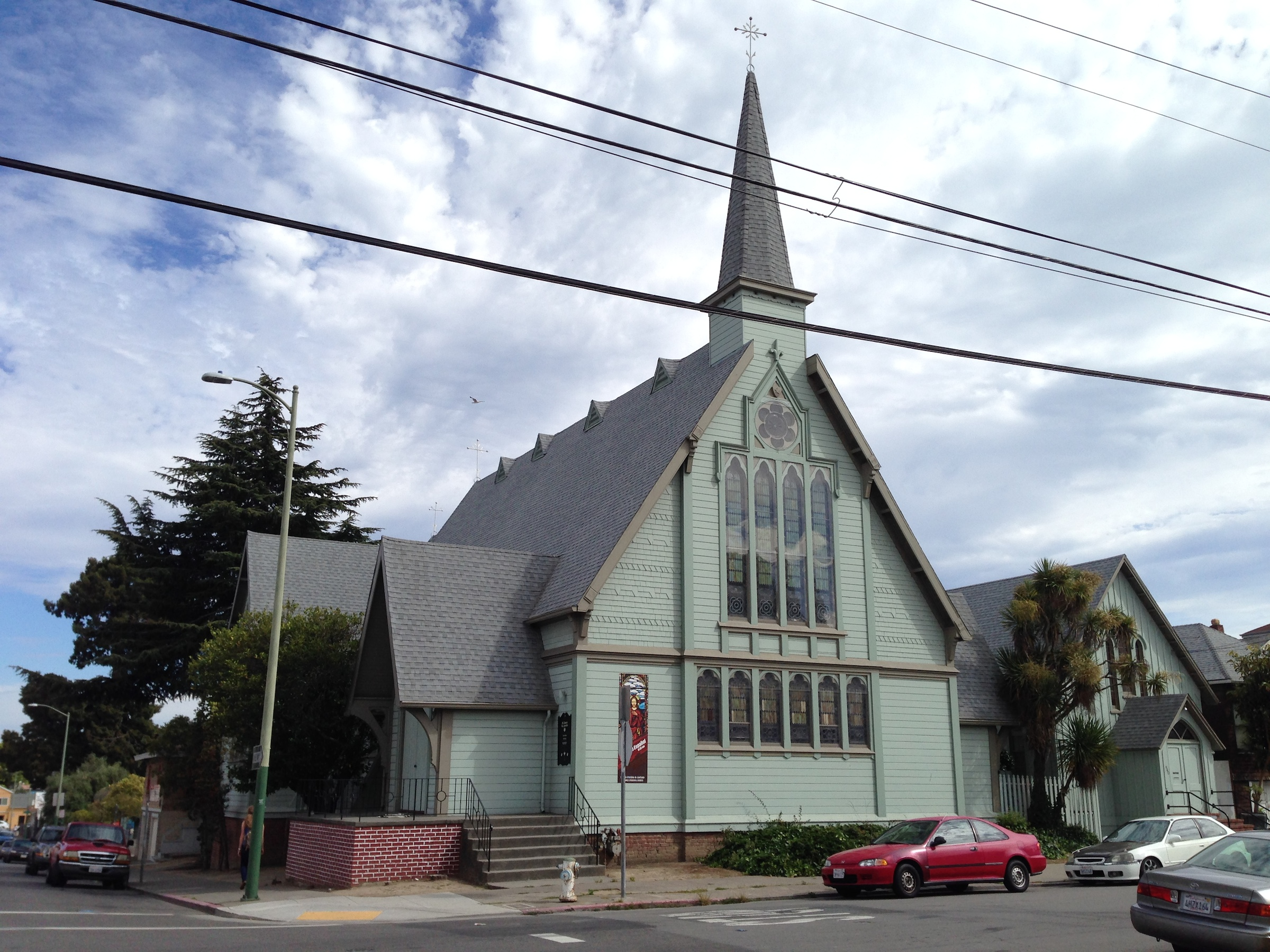
The Church of St. James the Apostle in Oakland, designed by Wright & Sanders in the Stick style and completed in 1886.

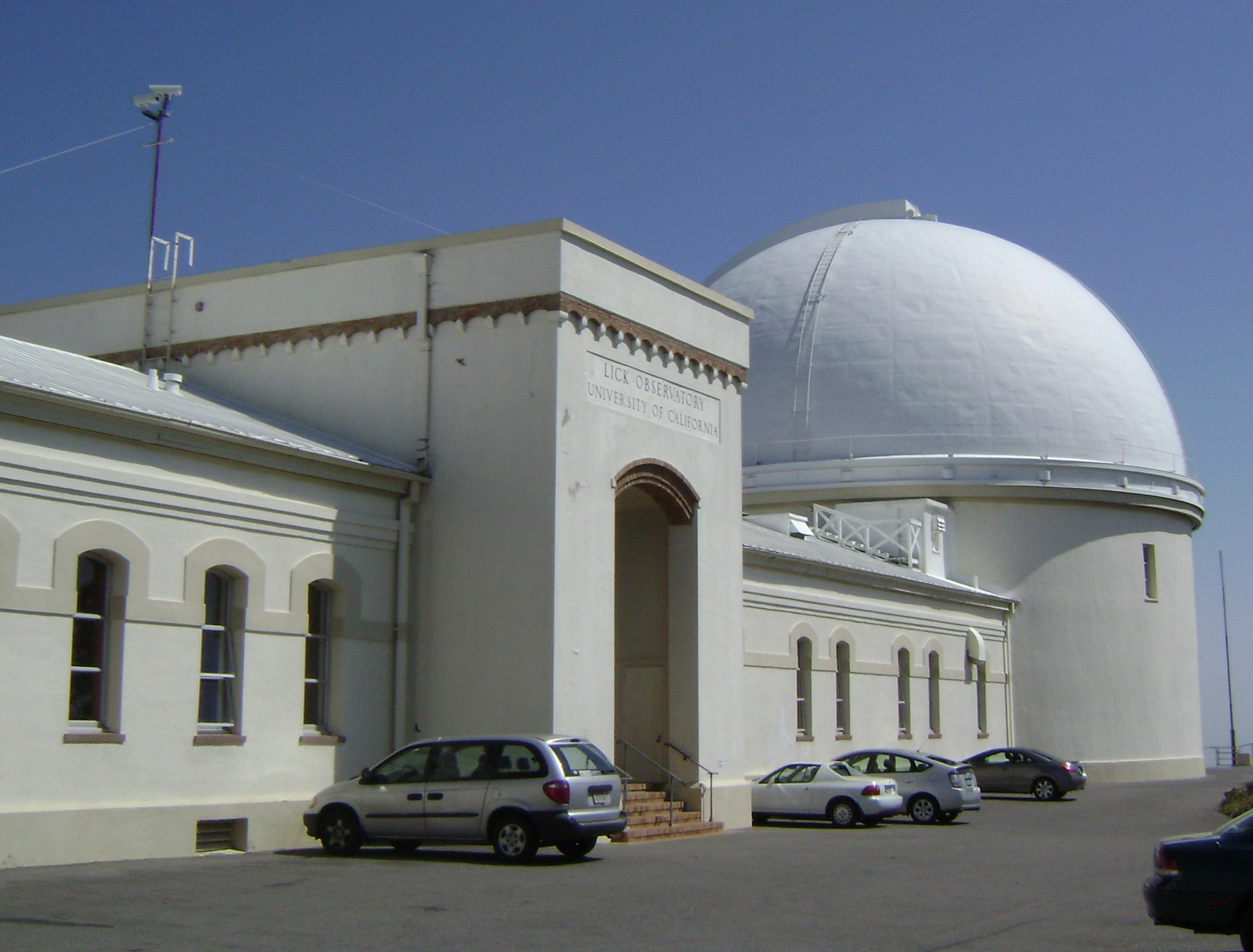
The Lick Observatory on Mount Hamilton, designed by Wright & Sanders in the Queen Anne style and completed in 1888.

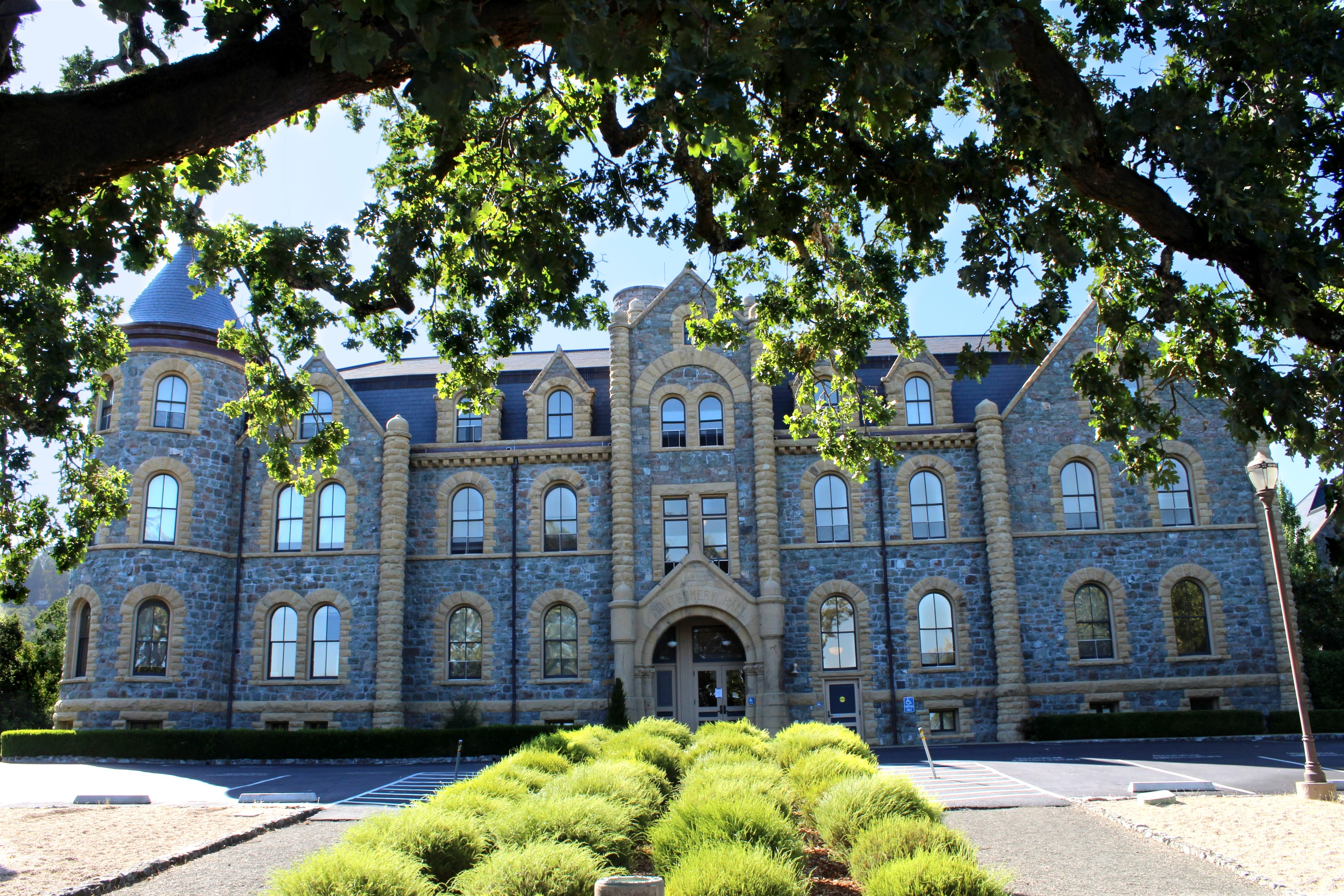
Montgomery Hall of the San Francisco Theological Seminary, designed by Wright & Sanders in the Richardsonian Romanesque style and completed in 1892.

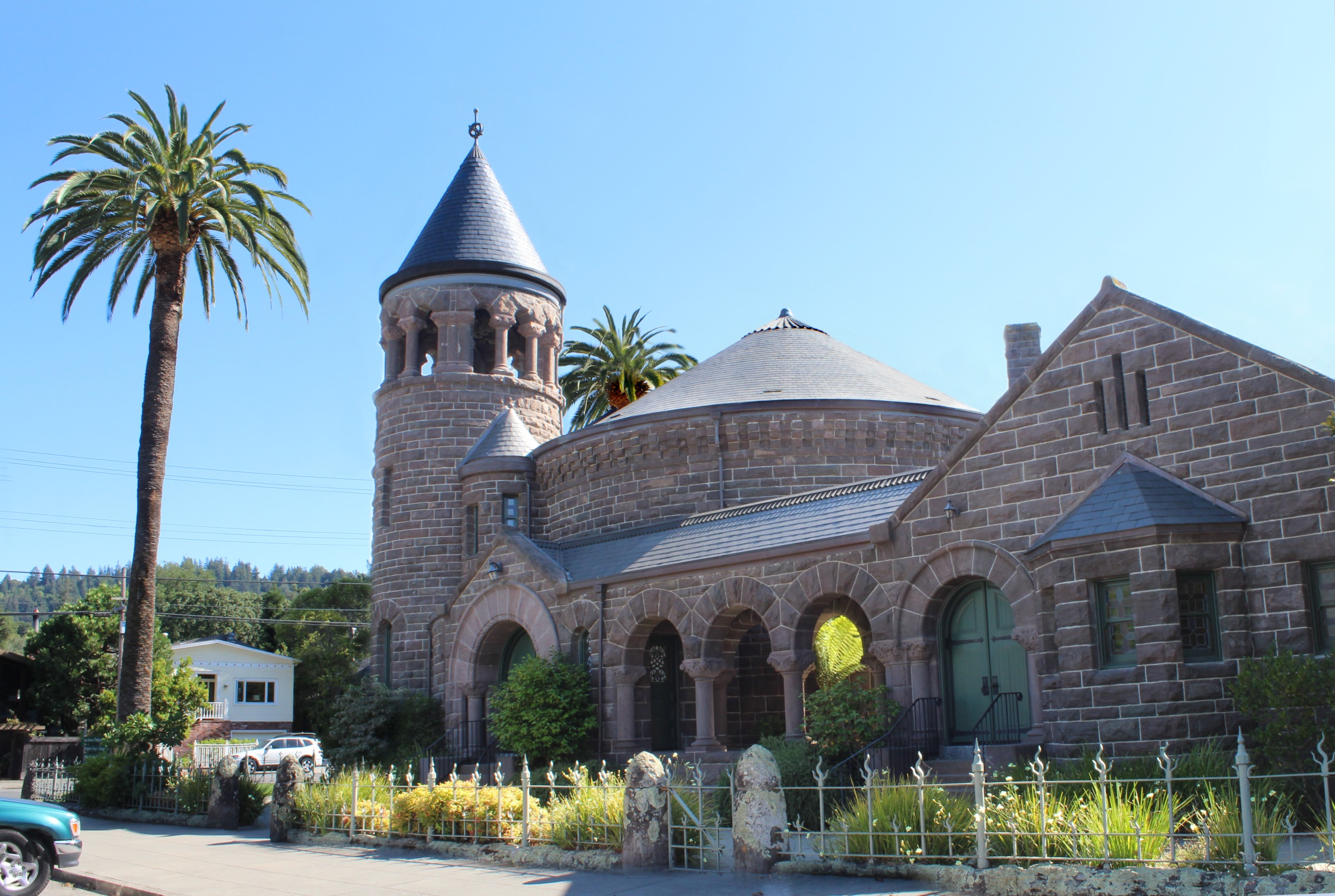
The Montgomerey Memorial Chapel of the San Francisco Theological Seminary, designed by Wright & Sanders in the Richardsonian Romanesque style and completed in 1893.

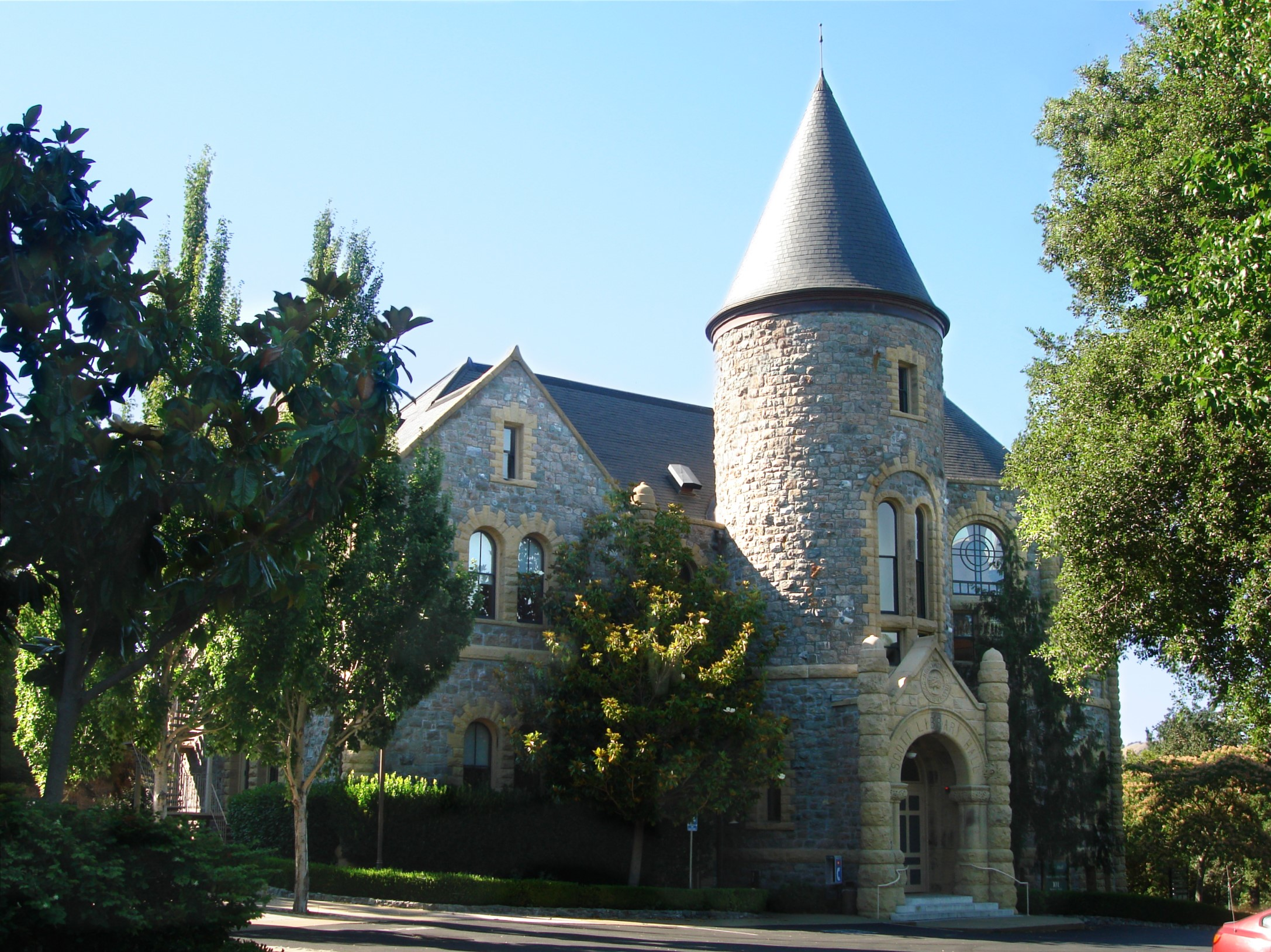
Scott Hall of the San Francisco Theological Seminary, designed by Wright & Sanders in the Richardsonian Romanesque style and completed in 1897.

Wright & Sanders was an American architectural firm. It was established in 1858 in Victoria, British Columbia, by John Wright, the first professional architect to practice in the province. In 1861 Wright formed the partnership of Wright & Sanders with George H. Sanders; they moved to San Francisco in 1867. Wright retired from practice in 1895, followed by Sanders c. 1906, about the time the firm's office, and much of its built work, was destroyed by the 1906 San Francisco earthquake. The firm was responsible for major projects in both British Columbia and California.

== History ==
John Wright, a native of Scotland, immigrated to Canada in 1845 and settled in Victoria in 1858. He was the first professional architect to establish himself in British Columbia. In 1861 Wright formed the partnership of Wright & Sanders with George H. Sanders, who had joined the office as a drafter the year before. Wright was the public face of the firm, and it is to him that firm's works are usually attributed. Sanders' role is not specifically known and he has usually been assigned the role of business manager. However, it was Sanders, not Wright, who had architectural training while Wright had been trained in carpentry and engineering, indicating that Sanders may have had a behind-the-scenes role in architectural design while Wright handled the more practical aspects of design and superindendence.

Wright & Sanders practiced in Victoria for the next six years, designing a variety of buildings including houses, churches and Congregation Emanu-El, the oldest synagogue on the west coast of North America. In 1866 they entered and won an architectural competition to design the new Asylum for the Deaf, Dumb and Blind in Berkeley, California. Due to the project's size and complexity, they relocated to San Francisco in 1867. In 1868 they also won a competition to design the new campus of the University of California, Berkeley, but refused the job over a compensation dispute.

The firm was even more productive in San Francisco. In addition to churches, they designed houses for men like Mark Hopkins Jr. and Alfred A. Cohen, the campus of the San Francisco Theological Seminary, the Napa State Hospital, Lick Observatory on Mount Hamilton and some of San Francisco's earliest skyscrapers. The firm kept up their Victoria connections and late in their partnership they were commissioned to design the Great Western Hotel, plans for which were completed but the project was ultimately canceled due to local conditions and the panic of 1893. Wright withdrew from the partnership in 1895, at about the age of 65. Sanders continued the firm after Wright's retirement at least until the time of the 1906 San Francisco earthquake. The earthquake and ensuing fires destroyed the firm's drawings and records as well as a large part of their built work. The firm appears in a business directory published shortly after the disaster at a temporary address, though Sanders likely chose to retire shortly thereafter.

== Partner biographies ==
=== John Wright ===
John Wright FAIA (May 15, 1830 – August 23, 1915) was born in Killearn, Scotland. He immigrated to Canada in 1845, settling with relatives near Guelph, Ontario. He trained there as a carpenter and engineer, and established himself as a contractor. In 1856 he was appointed superintendent for the new Guelph City Hall (1857), which was designed by William Thomas. He moved to Victoria the year after that building was completed. There, in addition to his practice, he was appointed superintendent of Fisgard Lighthouse and Race Rocks Light, both completed in 1860.

In 1881 Wright was a founding member of the Pacific Coast Association of Architects (PCAA), a San Francisco-based organization, and was elected its first vice president. In 1882 the PCAA joined the American Institute of Architects (AIA) as the organization's San Francisco chapter. At this time Wright was made a Fellow of the AIA and was elected the first chapter president. He served until 1884.

In 1858 Wright married Agnes Scott Armstrong, the daughter of a Guelph businessman. They had ten children. Mrs. Wright died in 1890. After his retirement, Wright spent his time traveling and mentoring young architects. He died in Victoria at the age of 85 while en route to Ontario.

=== George H. Sanders ===
George Hippisley Sanders FAIA (August 2, 1838 – January 22, 1920) was born in Guelph, Ontario, to John Arnold Sanders, an artist and teacher, and Fanny Sanders, née Hippisley. His parents had immigrated to Canada from England in 1832 and his paternal grandfather, John Sanders, was also an artist. Sanders was articled to Toronto architect William Thomas. It was during this period that Wright was superintending construction of Thomas' Guelph City Hall, and the men may have met on the building site. Regardless of how they met, Sanders followed Wright to Victoria in 1860.

Like Wright, Sanders was a founding member of the PCAA in 1881 and became a Fellow of the AIA the following year. He served as chapter president from 1888 to 1894. In 1900 he was a delegate to the fifth International Congress of Architects, held in concert with the Exposition Universelle in Paris. Sanders led the drafting and design courses offered by the chapter and in 1895 was involved in the organization of the first formal architectural school on the west coast, at the California School of Design.

In 1868 Sanders married Euphemia Armstrong, a sister of Wright's wife, in San Francisco. On Independence Day, about two months later, Mrs. Sanders drowned when the gangway connecting the Oakland Long Wharf and the El Capitan collapsed. Sanders and his sister also fell into the water but were rescued. Sanders married his second wife, Emma Burgess, in 1907. Sanders and his second wife were affiliated with The New Church and were congregants of the First Swedenborgian Church of the New Jerusalem, or O'Farrell Street Church, for which he was the architect. The second Mrs. Sanders died in 1916 and Sanders moved to Berkeley, where he lived with a stepdaughter. He died there at the age of 81.

== Legacy ==
At least two notable San Francisco architects, Bernard Maybeck and George Applegarth, worked for Wright & Sanders. Applegarth, a nephew of Sanders, worked for the firm from c. 1895 to c. 1901.

The bulk of Wright & Sanders' work in San Francisco was destroyed during the 1906 San Francisco earthquake and ensuing fires. Other projects were demolished or otherwise destroyed over time. Much move of his work in British Columbia survives. In California, major extant works include the Church of St. James the Apostle (1886) in Oakland, the Lick Observatory (1888) and three major buildings on the campus of the San Francisco Theological Seminary.

Three of the firm's works have been designated National Historic Sites of Canada, and two others have been designated California Historical Landmarks.

== Architectural works ==
- 1860 – Pandora Avenue Methodist Church, (Note: Demolished or otherwise destroyed.) Pandora Ave and Broad St, Victoria, British Columbia
- 1861 – James Bissett house, 140 Government St, Victoria, British Columbia
- 1861 – Nanaimo Methodist Church, Wallace St, Nanaimo, British Columbia
- 1862 – Church of St. John the Divine, Douglas St, Yale, British Columbia
- 1862 – Dickson, Campbell & Company Store, 1900 Store St, Victoria, British Columbia
- 1863 – Emily Carr House, (Note: Designated a National Historic Site of Canada.) 207 Government St, Victoria, British Columbia
- 1863 – Congregation Emanu-El, 1461 Blanshard St, Victoria, British Columbia
- 1863 – First Presbyterian Church, Blanshard St and Pandora Ave, Victoria, British Columbia
- 1863 – Point Ellice House, the Charles W. Wallace house, 2616 Pleasant St, Victoria, British Columbia
- 1866 – Angela College (former), 923 Burdett Ave, Victoria, British Columbia
- 1869 – California State Asylum for the Deaf, Dumb and Blind, 2601 Warring St, Berkeley, California
- 1869 – Calvary Presbyterian Church, Powell St and Geary Blvd, San Francisco
- 1869 – Friedlander's Building, California and Sansome Sts, San Francisco
- 1870 – First Congregational Church, (Note: Destroyed in the 1906 San Francisco earthquake.) 491 Post St, San Francisco
- 1870 – First Methodist Church, Powell St, San Francisco
- 1870 – The White House, Kearny and Post Sts, San Francisco
- 1871 – Oakland High School, Market and 12th Sts, Oakland, California
- 1872 – Central Presbyterian Church, Tyler St, San Francisco
- 1873 – Central Pacific Railroad Office Building, 4th and Townsend Sts, San Francisco
- 1875 – Napa State Hospital, Napa, California
- 1876 – McCreery Building, Pine St, San Francisco
- 1878 – California State Asylum for the Deaf, Dumb and Blind, 2601 Warring St, Berkeley, California
- 1878 – Mark Hopkins Jr. house, 999 California St, San Francisco
- 1880 – Bellrose, the John Garber house, Claremont Ave, Berkeley, California
- 1881 – Cooper Medical College, Webster and Sacramento Sts, San Francisco
- 1881 – St. Stephen Episcopal Church (former), (Note: Designated a California Historical Landmark.) 864 Fulton St, San Francisco
- 1882 – Eagle Block, Pine and Davis Sts, San Francisco
- 1882 – First Presbyterian Church, Sacramento and Van Ness Sts, San Francisco
- 1884 – Odd Fellows Building, 26 7th St, San Francisco
- 1885 – Pacific Union Club, Post and Stockton Sts, San Francisco
- 1885 – Pioneer Hall for the Society of California Pioneers, 24 4th St, San Francisco
- 1886 – Church of St. James the Apostle, 1540 Twelfth Ave, Oakland, California
- 1887 – Lachman Block, Market and Fremont Sts, San Francisco
- 1888 – First National Bank Building, Sansome and Bush Sts, San Francisco
- 1888 – Lick Observatory, 7281 Mt Hamilton Rd, Mount Hamilton, California
- 1890 – James Lick Baths, 165 10th St, San Francisco
- 1891 – First Swedenborgian Church of the New Jerusalem, 1640 O'Farrell St, San Francisco
- 1891 – Pacific Mutual Life Insurance Company Building, 500 Montgomery St, San Francisco
- 1892 – Montgomery Hall, San Francisco Theological Seminary, San Anselmo, California
- 1893 – Montgomery Memorial Chapel, San Francisco Theological Seminary, San Anselmo, California
- 1897 – Scott Hall, San Francisco Theological Seminary, San Anselmo, California
