= List of museums in British Columbia =

This list of museums in British Columbia, Canada contains museums which are defined for this context as institutions (including nonprofit organizations, government entities, and private businesses) that collect and care for objects of cultural, artistic, scientific, or historical interest and make their collections or related exhibits available for public viewing. Also included are non-profit art galleries and university art galleries. Museums that exist only in cyberspace (i.e., virtual museums) are not included.

Name	Town/City	Regional District	Type	Summary
3 Valley Gap Heritage Ghost Town	Three Valley Gap	Columbia-Shuswap	Open air	website, includes over 25 historic buildings, antique automobile museum, railway roundhouse, mining company, wagon and buggy shop
5th (BC) Artillery Regiment Museum	Victoria	Capital	Military	History of 5th (British Columbia) Field Artillery Regiment, RCA and associated units from 1861 to the present day, field artillery, located in the Bay Street Armoury
12 Service Battalion Museum	Richmond	Greater Vancouver	Military	Open by appointment
108 Heritage Site	108 Mile Ranch	Cariboo	Open air	website
Agassiz-Harrison Museum	Agassiz	Fraser Valley	History	website, local history and area railroad history
Akerman Museum	Saltspring Island	Capital	History	information, pioneer and native artifacts
Alaska Highway House	Dawson Creek	Peace River	History	information, history and technology of the construction of the Alaska Highway
Alberni Valley Museum	Port Alberni	Alberni-Clayoquot	History	website, local history and culture, including collection of First Nations artifacts
Alder Grove Community Museum & Archives	Aldergrove	Greater Vancouver	History	website, operated by the Alder Grove Heritage Society, focus is on preserving and sharing Aldergrove's community history
Alert Bay Public Library and Museum	Alert Bay	Mount Waddington	History	website, local history and culture
Armstrong-Spallumcheen Museum and Art Gallery	Armstrong	North Okanagan	Multiple	, local history and art
Art Gallery of Greater Victoria	Victoria	Capital	Art	website, Features Asian, Canadian and contemporary art
Artspeak	Vancouver	Greater Vancouver	Art	website, contemporary art centre
Ashcroft Museum	Ashcroft	Thompson-Nicola	History	website, local history
Ashton Armoury Museum	Victoria	Capital	Military	website, histories of the local Service Corps, Medical Corps, Signals Corps and Military Police units
Atchelitz Threshermen's Association Museum	Chilliwack	Fraser Valley	Technology	website, includes old cars, trucks, horse equipment, tractors, steam engines, gas engines and local artifacts
Atlin Historical Museum	Atlin	Stikine	History	information, local history, operated by the Atlin Historical Society
Audain Art Museum	Whistler	Sea to Sky Corridor	Art	The Audain Art Museum's Permanent Collection of nearly 200 works of art is a visual journey through the history of art from coastal British Columbia.
Audain Gallery	Vancouver	Greater Vancouver	Art	website, operated by Simon Fraser University at the Goldcorp Centre for the Arts
Barkerville Historic Town	Barkerville	Cariboo	Open air	website, 19th century gold mining town
Beaty Biodiversity Museum	Vancouver	Greater Vancouver	Natural history	website, Part of University of British Columbia
BC Artifacts Mobile Museum	Delta	Metro Vancouver	Aboriginal Artifacts	website, Fur Trade and Gold Rush
BC Farm Museum	Langley	Metro Vancouver	Agriculture	website, farm equipment and machinery
BC Forest Discovery Centre	Duncan	Cowichan Valley	Industry	website, Logging industry equipment and artifacts, railroad equipment
BC Golf Museum and Hall of Fame	Vancouver	Greater Vancouver	Sports	website
BC Interior Forestry Museum	Revelstoke	Columbia-Shuswap	Industry	website, forestry industry
BC Orchard Industry Museum	Kelowna	Central Okanagan	Industry	website, includes irrigation, fruit picking, packing, and 50-foot working model railway
BC Sports Hall of Fame and Museum	Vancouver	Greater Vancouver	Sports	Located at BC Place Stadium
BC Wildlife Park Train Museum	Kamloops	Thompson-Nicola	Railway	
BC Wine Museum	Kelowna	Central Okanagan	Industry	wine making and local history
Bella Coola Valley Museum	Bella Coola	Cariboo	History	website, local history
Black Nugget Museum	Ladysmith	Cowichan Valley	History	Former hotel with historic mining town artifacts
Bowen Island Community Museum	Bowen Island	Metro Vancouver	History	website, local history and Higgens Cabin, a 1948 period logger's cabin with tools and period rooms
Boundary Museum & Interpretive Centre	Grand Forks	Kootenay Boundary	History	website, local history, Doukhobor history
Bralorne Pioneer Museum	Bralorne	Squamish-Lillooet	History	Local history
Britannia Shipyards National Historic Site	Richmond	Greater Vancouver	Maritime	website, historic shipyard with ongoing restoration of vessels
Britannia Mine Museum	Britannia Beach	Squamish-Lillooet	Mining	Former copper mine with buildings, mine tunnel and equipment; also includes Mill No. 3, a National Historic Site
British Columbia Aviation Museum	Sidney	Capital	Aerospace	website, Aircraft, engines, pictures, models and artifacts
Bulkley Valley Museum	Smithers	Bulkley-Nechako	History	website, natural history, social and technological development of the Bulkley Valley
Burnaby Art Gallery	Burnaby	Greater Vancouver	Art	website, contemporary and historical art exhibits and events by local, regional, national and international artists in the galleries of Ceperley House and throughout the community
Burnaby Village Museum	Burnaby	Greater Vancouver	Open air	website, 1890-1920s period British Columbia village
Canadian Lacrosse Hall of Fame and Museum	New Westminster	Greater Vancouver	Sports	Located at Anvil Centre
Canadian Military Education Centre	Chilliwack	Fraser Valley	Military	website
Canadian Museum of Flight	Langley	Metro Vancouver	Aerospace	website, Includes over 25 civilian and military jets, engine aircraft, gliders, helicopters, aviation art gallery
Canadian Museum of Rail Travel	Cranbrook	East Kootenay	Railway	Also known as Trains Deluxe
Canadian Scottish Regiment (Princess Mary's) Regimental Museum	Victoria	Capital	Military	
Centre A	Vancouver	Greater Vancouver	Art	website, Non-profit gallery for contemporary Asian art
CFB Esquimalt Naval & Military Museum	Esquimalt	Capital	Military	History and heritage of the naval presence on Canada's West Coast and of the military on Southern Vancouver Island
Chase & District Museum and Archives	Chase	Thompson-Nicola	History	website, local history
Chemainus Valley Museum	Chemainus	Cowichan Valley	History	Local history
Cherryville Museum	Cherryville	North Okanagan	History	website, local history, operated by the Cherryville & Area Historical Society
Chilliwack Museum	Chilliwack	Fraser Valley	Multiple	website, local history and art, a National Historic Site of Canada
Chinese Cultural Center Museum	Vancouver	Greater Vancouver	Ethnic	website, also includes Chinese Canadian Military Museum
Clinton Museum	Clinton	Thompson-Nicola	History	information, local history; also known as South Cariboo Historical Museum
Comox Air Force Museum	Comox	Comox Valley	Aerospace	History of CFB Comox and military aviation on the west coast of Canada
Comox Valley Art Gallery	Courtenay	Comox Valley	Art	website, regional public art gallery dedicated to exhibiting, interpreting and celebrating emergent contemporary art practices
Contemporary Art Gallery	Vancouver	Greater Vancouver	Art	website
Cortes Island Museum	Cortes Island	Strathcona	Multiple	website, art, natural and cultural history of the island
Cottonwood House Historic Site	Quesnel	Cariboo	History	website, Historic road house along the Cariboo Road
Courtenay and District Museum and Palaeontology Centre	Courtenay	Comox Valley	Multiple	website, area's natural and cultural history and art
Cowichan Bay Maritime Centre	Cowichan Bay	Cowichan Valley	Maritime	website, maritime heritage and culture of wooden boats
Cowichan Valley Museum	Duncan	Cowichan Valley	History	website, local history, operated by the Cowichan Historical Society
Craigdarroch Castle	Victoria	Capital	Historic house	website, Victorian-era mansion
Craigflower Manor and Schoolhouse	Victoria	Capital	Historic house	19th century manor and schoolhouse
Creston Museum	Creston	Central Kootenay	History	website, local history
Crofton Old School House Museum	Crofton	Cowichan Valley	Education	Historic one room school
Cumberland Museum & Archives	Cumberland	Comox Valley	History	website, local history, coal mining, historic telephones
Dawson Creek Art Gallery	Dawson Creek	Peace River	Art	website
Deep Creek Tool Museum	Salmon Arm	Columbia-Shuswap	Technology	Collection of tools, engines, and equipment dating back to the early 20th century
Delta Museum and Archives	Delta	Greater Vancouver	History	website, local history
Denman Island Museum	Denman Island	Comox Valley	History	information, local history
Dixon Entrance Maritime Museum	Masset	Skeena-Queen Charlotte	Maritime	information
Doukhobor Discovery Centre	Castlegar	Central Kootenay	Culture	website, arts, crafts, and daily life of the Doukhobors of the Kootenays in 1908–1938
Emily Carr House	Victoria	Capital	Historic house	website, Childhood home of Canadian painter Emily Carr
Emily Carr University of Art and Design Galleries	Vancouver	Greater Vancouver	Art	website, Charles H. Scott, Media and Concourse Galleries
Enderby and District Museum	Enderby	North Okanagan	History	website, local history
Evergreen Cultural Centre	Coquitlam	Greater Vancouver	Art	Cultural arts centre with exhibition gallery
The Exploration Place	Prince George	Fraser-Fort George	Multiple	website, science, natural history, paleontology, regional sports history, local history, First Nations; formerly known as Fraser-Fort George Regional Museum
Falkland Museum and Heritage Park	Falkland	Columbia-Shuswap	Open air	website, includes 1800s sod roofed pioneer cabin, church, agriculture tools and equipment
Fintry Estate	Fintry	Central Okanagan	Historic house	website
Fisgard Lighthouse National Historic Site	Colwood	Capital	Maritime	Lighthouse keeper's residence and maritime exhibits
Fort Langley Heritage CN Station	Fort Langley	Greater Vancouver	Railroad	website Restored 19th-century station with railroad artifacts
Fort Langley National Historic Site	Fort Langley	Greater Vancouver	Open air	Former trading post of the Hudson's Bay Company with historic crafts and demonstrations
Fort Nelson Heritage Museum	Fort Nelson	Northern Rockies	Multiple	website, antique cars and trucks, road building equipment, license plates, historic buildings, tools, minerals, toys, household items
Fort Rodd Hill National Historic Site	Colwood	Capital	Military	19th-century coastal artillery fort
Fort St. James National Historic Site	Fort St. James	Bulkley-Nechako	Open air	Restored Hudson's Bay Company post with 1896 living history guides in the summer
Fort St. John North Peace Museum	Fort St. John	Peace River	History	website, local history
Fort Steele Heritage Town	Fort Steele	East Kootenay	Open air	Historic ghost town with preserved buildings and historic displays
Fraser River Discovery Centre	New Westminster	Metro Vancouver	Multiple	website, natural history, ecology, industry, and history of the Fraser River and its local impact
Gabriola Museum	Gabriola Island	Nanaimo	History	website, local cultural and natural history
Galiano Museum	Galiano Island	Capital	History	website, local history
Gallery 2: Grand Forks and District Art and Heritage Centre	Grand Forks	Kootenay Boundary	Multiple	website, operated by the Grand Forks Area Arts Council, art and local history
Glacier National Park	Revelstoke	Columbia-Shuswap	Multiple	Rogers Pass Discovery Centre exhibits include natural history of the park, Canadian Pacific Railway, Trans-Canada Highway and the route through the Rogers Pass
Golden Museum	Golden	Columbia-Shuswap	History	website, local history
Greater Vernon Museum and Archives	Vernon	North Okanagan	History	website, local history, includes gallery with art by Allan Brooks and other North Okanagan artists
Greenwood Museum	Greenwood	Kootenay Boundary	History	website, local history
Gulf of Georgia Cannery	Steveston	Greater Vancouver	Maritime	History of the West Coast fishing industry and the cannery
H. R. MacMillan Space Centre	Vancouver	Greater Vancouver	Science	Exhibits about space and science
Haida Heritage Centre	Skidegate	Skeena-Queen Charlotte	First Nations	Cultural centre and Haida Gwaii Museum of the Haida people, Haida history, art, culture and contemporary life
Hatley Park National Historic Site	Colwood	Capital	Historic house	Early 20th-century Scottish Baronial-style castle mansion
Hardy Mountain Doukhobor Village Historic Site	Grand Forks	Kootenay Boundary	Open air	Operated by The Land Conservancy of British Columbia, former Doukhobor village
Hazelton Pioneer Museum & Archives	Hazelton	Stikine	History	Local history, part of the Hazelton District Public Library
Hedley Heritage Museum	Hedley	Okanagan-Similkameen	History	Local history
Helmcken House	Victoria	Capital	Historic house	19th century doctor's house
Heritage Acres	Saanich	Capital	Open air	website, operated by the Saanich Historical Artifacts Society, includes historic buildings, working steam engines, tractors, agricultural machinery, and household and industrial artifacts
PoCo Heritage Museum and Archives	Port Coquitlam	Metro Vancouver	History	website, local history, operated by the Port Coquitlam Heritage and Cultural Society.
Heritage Park Museum	Terrace	Kitimat-Stikine	Open air	website, pioneer buildings
Historic Hat Creek Ranch	Cache Creek	Thompson-Nicola	Open air	website
Historic O'Keefe Ranch	Vernon	North Okanagan	Open air	19th century ranch and community buildings
Historic Stewart Farm	Surrey	Metro Vancouver	Farm	website, restored 1894 farmhouse, pole barn, root cellar and heirloom gardens and orchard
Hope Museum	Hope	Fraser Valley	History	Local history
Huble Homestead Historic Site	Giscome Portage	Fraser-Fort George	Open air	website, includes Huble House, Salmon Valley Post Office, general store, trapper's Cabin, barns, blacksmith shop and the First Nations fish camp
Hudson's Hope Museum	Hudson's Hope	Peace River	Multiple	website, local history, fossils, natural history,
Iris Griffith Centre	Pender Harbour	Sunshine Coast	Natural history	website, operated by the Lagoon Society, focus is human interaction with the natural environment from the mountains down to the sea
Irving House	New Westminster	Greater Vancouver	Historic house	website, mid-19th century period house
Jack Lynn Memorial-Pioneer Museum	Horsefly	Cariboo	History	Local history
Japanese Canadian Museum	Kaslo	Central Kootenay	History	website, located in The Langham Cultural Society, history of the Japanese Canadian families who were interned in the former hotel during World War II
Jewish Museum and Archives of British Columbia	Vancouver	Greater Vancouver	Ethnic	website
Jim's Ford Corral Museum	Sorrento	Columbia-Shuswap	Commodity	Includes gas-station memorabilia, farm equipment and scale-model toys
Kaatza Station Museum	Lake Cowichan	Cowichan Valley	History	website, local history, include a store, post office, mine shaft and logging displays, also railroad cars and equipment; located in a railroad station, operated by the Kaatza Historical Society
Kamloops Art Gallery	Kamloops	Thompson-Nicola	Art	website
Kamloops Museum & Archives	Kamloops	Thompson-Nicola	History	Local history, culture, children's section
Kelowna Art Gallery	Kelowna	Central Okanagan	Art	
Keremeos Grist Mill	Keremeos	Okanagan-Similkameen	Mill	website, also known as The Grist Mill and Gardens
Kettle River Museum	Midway	Kootenay Boundary	History	website, local history
Kilby Historic Site	Harrison Mills	Fraser Valley	Multiple	Located in Kilby Provincial Park, includes Kilby General Store Museum with 1920s and 1930s merchandise, working heritage Waterloo Farm Museum
Kimberley Heritage Museum	Kimberley	East Kootenay	History	website, local history
Kimberley's Underground Mining Railway	Kimberley	East Kootenay	Railroad	website, heritage railroad and mining tour; operated by the Sullivan Mine and Railway Historical Society
Kitimat Museum	Kitimat	Kitimat-Stikine	Multiple	website, local history, multiculturalism, turn-of-the-20th-century settlement, Haisla arts and technology, natural history
Kootenay Gallery	Castlegar	Central Kootenay	Art	website
'Ksan Historical Village and Museum	Hazelton	Stikine	First Nations	Museum and replica ancient village
Ktunaxa Interpretive Centre	Cranbrook	East Kootenay	First Nations	Located in the St. Eugene Golf Resort and Casino, culture of the Ktunaxa
Kwinitsa Station Railway Museum	Prince Rupert	Skeena-Queen Charlotte	Railway	
Lake Country Museum	Lake Country	Central Okanagan	History	website, local history
Lakes District Museum	Burns Lake	Bulkley-Nechako	History	Local history
Langley Centennial Museum	Langley	Greater Vancouver	Multiple	website, local history and temporary art, history or science exhibitions
Legacy Art Gallery and Cafe	Victoria	Capital	Art	Contemporary art gallery of the University of Victoria, works by local and Canadian artists
Lumby Museum	Lumby	North Okanagan	History	website, local history, agricultural and logging machinery, operated by the Lumby & District Historical Society
Lillooet Museum	Lillooet	Squamish-Lillooet	History	Local history
London Heritage Farm	Richmond	Greater Vancouver	Historic house	1880s period farmhouse
Lytton Chinese History Museum	Lytton	Thompson-Nicola	History	website, Chinese history, destroyed in Lytton wildfire, rebuilt and opened in 2025, open May-Sep
Mackenzie and District Museum	Mackenzie	Fraser-Fort George	History	website, local history, located in the Ernie Bodin Centre
Mackie Lake House	Coldstream	North Okanagan	Historic house	website, 1910 Arts & Crafts style house
Mackin House	Coquitlam	Greater Vancouver	Historic house	website, operated by the Coquitlam Heritage Society, 1910 period house, toy displays and local history
Maltwood Prints and Drawings Gallery	Saanich	Capital	Art	Part of University of Victoria, rotating exhibits from the university's collections at the Mearns Centre - McPherson Library
Maple Ridge Museum	Maple Ridge	Greater Vancouver	History	website, local history, also Haney House Museum, a late 19th-century period house
Maritime Museum of British Columbia	Victoria	Capital	Maritime	
Mascot Gold Mine	Hedley	Okanagan-Similkameen	Mining	Seasonal tours of the mine and mine buildings
Mayne Island Museum	Mayne Island	Capital	History	Local history, located in a former jail
McLean Mill National Historic Site	Port Alberni	Metro Vancouver	Industry	Historic sawmill, end point of the heritage Alberni Pacific Railway
Metchosin School Museum	Metchosin	Capital	History	website, housed in a one-room schoolhouse, local history and historic items
Michif Métis Museum	Vavenby	Thompson-Nicola	First Nations	website
Miniature World	Victoria	Capital	Toy	website, miniature dioramas
Mission Museum	Mission	Fraser Valley	History	website, local history
Miyazaki House	Lillooet	Squamish-Lillooet	Multiple	Historic house, local history and art
MSA Museum	Abbotsford	Fraser Valley	Multiple	website, includes the 1920s period Trethewey House Heritage Site, and changing exhibits of local history
Museum at Campbell River	Campbell River	Strathcona	History	website, culture and history of Northern Vancouver Island
Museum of Anthropology at UBC	Vancouver	Greater Vancouver	First Nations	Aboriginal Canadian culture and artifacts
Museum of Archaeology & Ethnology	Burnaby	Greater Vancouver	Archaeology	website, part of Simon Fraser University
Museum of Northern BC	Prince Rupert	Skeena-Queen Charlotte	First Nations	website
Museum of the Cariboo Chilcotin	Williams Lake	Cariboo	Cowboy	website, ranching and cowboy culture, includes BC Cowboy Hall of Fame
Museum of Vancouver	Vancouver	Greater Vancouver	History	City history
Nakusp & District Museum	Nakusp	Central Kootenay	History	Local history
Nanaimo Art Gallery	Nanaimo	Nanaimo	Art	website
Nanaimo Bastion	Nanaimo	Nanaimo	History	1850s octagonal bastion, tours in the summer
Nanaimo Museum	Nanaimo	Nanaimo	History	website, local history
Naramata Heritage Museum	Naramata	Okanagan-Similkameen	History	website, local history, located in a former fire hall
New Media Gallery	New Westminster	Greater Vancouver	Art	website, local history, operated by the City in the Anvil Centre
New Westminster Museum	New Westminster	Greater Vancouver	History	website, local history, located in the Anvil Centre, includes displays about the New Westminster Police
Nicola Valley Museum and Archives	Merritt	Thompson-Nicola	History	Local history
Nikkei Internment Memorial Centre	New Denver	Central Kootenay	Military	History of the Japanese Canadians that were relocated to internment camps during World War II
Nikkei National Museum & Cultural Centre	Burnaby	Greater Vancouver	Ethnic	website, also known as Nikkei Centre, Japanese Canadian culture and contributions to Canada
Nisga'a Memorial Lava Bed Provincial Park	Gitlakdamix	Kitimat-Stikine	Natural history	Visitor center exhibits include natural history of the park, Nisga'a culture, tours of the lava beds
Nisga'a Museum	Laxgalts'ap		First Nations	History and culture of the Nisga'a
Nk'Mip Desert Cultural Centre	Osoyoos	Okanagan-Similkameen	Multiple	Okanagan People, natural history of the desert
North Pacific Cannery National Historic Site	Port Edward	Skeena-Queen Charlotte	Open air	website, tours of historic fish cannery buildings; also known as North Pacific Historic Fishing Village
North Thompson Museum	Barriere	Thompson-Nicola	History	website, local history, open in summer, housed in a former B.C. Forest Service Ranger Station
North Vancouver Museum & Archives	North Vancouver	Greater Vancouver	Multiple	website, local history and art
Notch Hill Historic Site	Sorrento	Columbia-Shuswap	Open air	
Nuymbalees Cultural Centre	Quadra Island	Strathcona	First Nations	website, formerly the Kwagiulth Museum, located in Cape Mudge
Okanagan Heritage Museum	Kelowna	Central Okanagan	History	website, area's history and culture
Okanagan Military Museum	Kelowna	Central Okanagan	Military	website
Okanagan Science Center	Vernon	North Okanagan	Science	website
Old Hastings Mill Store Museum	Vancouver	Greater Vancouver	History	Aboriginal Canadian, pioneer and immigrant artifacts
Old School House Arts Centre	Qualicum Beach	Nanaimo	Art	website
Oliver and District Museum	Oliver	Okanagan-Similkameen	History	website, local history, operated by the Oliver and District Heritage Society
Or Gallery	Vancouver	Greater Vancouver	Art	website
Osoyoos Desert Centre	Osoyoos	Okanagan-Similkameen	Natural history	67 acres, desert ecology, habitat restoration and conservation of endangered ecosystems in the South Okanagan
Osoyoos Desert Model Railroad	Osoyoos	Okanagan-Similkameen	Railroad	website, model railroad layouts
Pacific Museum of the Earth	Vancouver	Greater Vancouver	Natural history	website, operated by the University of British Columbia, rocks, minerals, fossils
Parksville Museum	Parksville	Nanaimo	Open air	website, located in Craig Heritage Park, displays a number of heritage buildings from the time of the first settlers in the area
Peace Canyon Dam Visitor Center	Hudson's Hope	Peace River	Multiple	Area history, natural history, building of the dam and hydroelectricity
Peachland Museum	Peachland	Central Okanagan	History	website, local history, operated by the Peachland Historical Society
Pemberton Museum	Pemberton	Squamish-Lillooet	History	website, local history, open seasonally
Penticton Art Gallery	Penticton	Okanagan-Similkameen	Art	website, formerly the Art Gallery of the South Okanagan
Penticton Museum	Penticton	Okanagan-Similkameen	Multiple	website, local history, culture, natural history and art
Pitt Meadows Museum	Pitt Meadows	Greater Vancouver	History	website, local history
Port Alberni Maritime Discovery Centre	Port Alberni	Alberni-Clayoquot	History	website, area cultural, environmental and industrial maritime history
Port Clements Museum	Port Clements	Skeena-Queen Charlotte	History	website, includes logging equipment, machinery and pioneer items, operated by the Port Clements Historical Society
Port Hardy Museum	Port Hardy	Mount Waddington	History	website, local history, operated by the Port Hardy Heritage Society
Port McNeill Heritage Museum	Port McNeill	Mount Waddington	History	Local history
PoMo Museum	Port Moody	Greater Vancouver	History	Local history, located in a historic railway station building
Pouce Coupe Museum	Pouce Coupe	Peace River	History	website, includes Heritage House, trapper's cabin, caboose and the original NAR train station, open seasonally
Powell River Forestry Museum	Powell River	Sunshine Coast	History	website, local logging and railway history, operated seasonally by the Powell River Forestry Heritage Society
Powell River Historical Museum	Powell River	Sunshine Coast	History	website, local history
Presentation House Gallery	North Vancouver	Metro Vancouver	Art	Photography and media art, emphasizing contemporary Canadian work within a context of historical and international art
Prince George Railway and Forestry Museum	Prince George	Fraser-Fort George	Railway	Includes historic buildings, locomotives and rolling stock, logging machinery, communication devices and fire department equipment
Prince Rupert Fire Hall Museum	Prince Rupert	Skeena-Queen Charlotte	Firefighting	website, information
Princeton District Pioneer Museum	Princeton	Okanagan-Similkameen	Multiple	Local history artifacts, fossils
Qualicum Beach Museum	Qualicum Beach	Nanaimo	Multiple	website, local history and fossils
Quesnel Museum	Quesnel	Cariboo	History	website, includes period room and business displays, Chinese artifacts
Quw’utsun Cultural Centre	Duncan	Cowichan Valley	First Nations	website, heritage of the Quw'utsun people
The Reach Gallery Museum	Abbotsford	Fraser Valley	Art	Exhibitions of local, regional, national and international art
Regimental Museum of the BC Regiment	Vancouver	Greater Vancouver	Military	History and artifacts of The British Columbia Regiment (Duke of Connaught's Own)
Revelstoke Dam Visitor Center	Revelstoke	Columbia-Shuswap	Multiple	History of the dam, science of hydroelectricity, First Nations history and culture
Revelstoke Firehall Museum	Revelstoke	Columbia-Shuswap	Firefighting	website
Revelstoke Nickelodeon Museum	Revelstoke	Columbia-Shuswap	Music	website, mechanical music machines including Victorian musical boxes, player pianos, player reed and pipe organs
Revelstoke Museum and Archives	Revelstoke	Columbia-Shuswap	History	website, local history
Revelstoke Railway Museum	Revelstoke	Columbia-Shuswap	Railroad	website
Revelstoke Visual Arts Centre	Revelstoke	Columbia-Shuswap	Art	website
Richmond Art Gallery	Richmond	Greater Vancouver	Art	website
Richmond Museum	Richmond	Greater Vancouver	History	website, local history and culture
RJ Haney Heritage Village & Museum	Salmon Arm	Columbia-Shuswap]	Open air	website
Rocky Mountain Rangers Museum	Kamloops	Thompson-Nicola	Military	website, located in the JR Vicars Armoury, history of The Rocky Mountain Rangers
Roedde House Museum	Vancouver	Greater Vancouver	Historic house	Late Victorian period house
Rossland Museum & Discovery Centre	Rossland	Kootenay Boundary	Multiple	website, year-round local history museum, historic park with mine and railway buildings. Operated by the Rossland Historical Museum & Archives Association. On the site of the Rossland Mines - Kootenay Mining Region National Historic Event designation.
Royal British Columbia Museum	Victoria	Capital	Multiple	History, natural history, First Nations culture
Rotary Centre for the Arts	Kelowna	Central Okanagan	Arts	Performing and cultural arts centre with art exhibits
Royal Westminster Regiment Historical Society and Museum	New Westminster	Greater Vancouver	Military	
Saanich Pioneer Museum	Saanichton	Capital	History	Operated by the Saanich Pioneer Society, pioneer and First Nations artifacts, also known as the Log Cabin Museum & Archives
Salmo Museum	Salmo	Central Kootenay	History	Local history
Salt Spring Island Museum	Ganges	Capital	History	website, local history, also known as the Bittancourt House Museum
Samson V Maritime Museum	New Westminster	Metro Vancouver	Maritime	website, sternwheel snagboat museum ship
Sandon Museum	Sandon	Central Kootenay	History	website, local history of the mining ghost town, operated seasonally by the Sandon Historical Society
Science World	Vancouver	Greater Vancouver	Science	
The Seaforth Museum	Vancouver	Greater Vancouver	Military	Located in the Seaforth Armoury, history and memorabilia of The Seaforth Highlanders of Canada
Secwepemc Museum and Heritage Park	Kamloops	Thompson-Nicola	First Nations	History & culture of the Shuswap People
Shawnigan Lake Museum	Shawnigan Lake	Cowichan Valley	History	website, local history
Sicamous & District Museum	Sicamous	Columbia-Shuswap	Technology	Local history, located in the Civic Centre, operated by the Sicamous & District Museum and Historical Society, formerly known as the Eagle Valley Museum
Sidney Museum and Archives	Sidney	Capital	Multiple	Local history, Saanich pioneers, includes period kitchen and school room
Silverton Historical Society Interpretive Centre	Silverton	Central Kootenay	History	website, local history, adjacent to outdoor Frank Mills Outdoor Mining Museum, restored Fingland Cabin & Blacksmith Shop
Silvery Slocan Museum	New Denver	Central Kootenay	History	Local history
Simon Fraser University Gallery	Burnaby	Greater Vancouver	Art	website, established in 1970
Snaza’ist Discovery Centre	Hedley	Okanagan-Similkameen	First Nations	website, history and culture of the Similkameen people, tours of the Mascot Gold Mine
Sncəwips Heritage Museum	Westbank	Central Okanagan	First Nations	website, representing the cultural heritage of Westbank First Nation and the greater Okanagan Nation
Sointula Museum	Sointula	Mount Waddington	History	website, local history
Sooke Region Museum	Sooke	Capital	Open air	website, includes museum with local history and culture exhibits, blacksmith shop, lighthouse equipment, machinery and equipment for agriculture and industry, 1902 period pioneer cottage
South Peace Historical Society Railway Station Museum	Dawson Creek	Peace River	History	Also known as N.A.R. Station Museum, includes pioneers, natural history, railroads and building of the Alaska Highway
South Similkameen Museum	Keremeos	Okanagan-Similkameen	History	website, local history, housed in a former police office and jail
Sparwood Museum	Sparwood	East Kootenay	History	Local history, operated by the Michel-Natal-Sparwood Heritage Society
Squamish Lil'wat Cultural Centre	Whistler	Squamish-Lillooet	First Nations	website
S.S. Moyie National Historic Site	Kaslo	Central Kootenay	Maritime	Passenger sternwheeler museum ship
Stave Falls Visitor Centre	Stave Falls	Fraser Valley	Science	Hydroelectricity and the dam
Stewart Historical Museum	Stewart	Stikine	History	Local history, operated by the Stewart Historical Society
Steveston Museum	Richmond	Greater Vancouver	History	Recreated rooms of a bank, post office, general store, and bedrooms
Summerland Museum	Summerland	Okanagan-Similkameen	History	website, local history and development
Sunshine Coast Museum and Archives	Gibsons	Sunshine Coast	Multiple	website, local maritime, natural and cultural history
Surrey Art Gallery	Surrey	Greater Vancouver	Multiple	website, contemporary art museum specializing in exhibitions and education, located in the Surrey Arts Centre
Surrey Museum	Surrey	Greater Vancouver	Multiple	website, local history and culture, changing exhibits of art, culture and science, historic log cabin, textile studio
Tahsis Museum	Tahsis	Strathcona	History	Local history
Teck Cominco Interpretive Centre	Trail	Kootenay Boundary	Mining	Science of mineral exploration, free tours of the zinc lead smelter
Teck Gallery	Vancouver	Greater Vancouver	Art	website, operated by Simon Fraser University at Harbour Centre
Telkwa Museum	Telkwa	Bulkley-Nechako	History	Local history, located in a 1921 school house
tems swiya Museum	Sechelt	Sunshine Coast	First Nations	Culture and history of the Shishalh peoples
Terrace Art Gallery	Terrace	Kitimat-Stikine	Art	website
Texada Island Museum	Texada Island	Sunshine Coast	History	website, local history, operated by the Texada Island Heritage Society
Touchstones Nelson Museum of Art and History	Nelson	Central Kootenay	Multiple	website, art and local history
Trail Museum	Trail	Kootenay Boundary	History	website, local history, operated by the Trail Historical Society
Trev Deeley Motorcycle Exhibition	Vancouver	Greater Vancouver	Transport	website, motorcycles and motorcycle racing
Two Rivers Gallery	Prince George	Fraser-Fort George	Art	website, operated by the Prince George Regional Art Gallery Association
U'mista Cultural Centre	Alert Bay	Mount Waddington	First Nations	website, cultural heritage of the Kwakwaka'wakw
Valemount Museum	Valemount	Fraser-Fort George	History	website, local history, located in the Valemount Historic Railway Station
Valley Museum and Archive	McBride	Fraser-Fort George	History	website, local history
Van Anda Museum	Texada Island	Sunshine Coast	Multiple	website, local history
Vancouver Art Gallery	Vancouver	Greater Vancouver	Art	Collections include major works by Emily Carr, the Group of Seven and Marc Chagall
Vancouver Holocaust Education Centre	Vancouver	Greater Vancouver	Holocaust	website
Vancouver Island Military Museum	Nanaimo	Nanaimo	Military	website
Vancouver Maritime Museum	Vancouver	Greater Vancouver	Maritime	
Vancouver Police Museum	Vancouver	Greater Vancouver	Law enforcement	
Vanderhoof Heritage Museum	Vanderhoof	Bulkley-Nechako	Open air	website, operated by the Nechako Valley Historical Society, restored 1900s period buildings, train cars, a heritage park and interpretive walking trails
Vernon Public Art Gallery	Vernon	North Okanagan	Art	website
Victoria Fire Department Museum	Victoria	Capital	Firefighting	website
Victoria Police Department Museum	Victoria	Capital	Law enforcement	
W. A. C. Bennett Dam Visitor Centre	Hudson's Hope	Peace River	Multiple	Area history, natural history, building of the dam and hydroelectricity
Walter Wright Pioneer Village	Dawson Creek	Peace River	Open air	website
Widzin Kwah Canyon House Museum (Widzin Kwah Diyik Be Yikh)	Witset	Bulkley-Nechako	First Nations	History and culture of the Wet'suwet'en
Wells Museum	Wells	Cariboo	History	website, local history, hard rock gold mining, operated by the Wells Historical Society
Railway Museum of British Columbia	Squamish	Squamish-Lillooet	Railway	Typical railway facility of the mid-20th century and restored railroad cars, operated by the West Coast Railway Association
West Vancouver Museum	West Vancouver	Greater Vancouver	Art	website
Westbank Museum	Westbank	Central Okanagan	History	website, local history
The Whale Centre	Tofino	Alberni-Clayoquot	Natural history	website, marine life and tours for watching whales, sea birds and marine mammals
Whale Interpretive Centre	Telegraph Cove	Mount Waddington	Natural history	website, operated by the Johnstone Strait Killer Whale Interpretive Centre Society, exhibits about killer whales, fin whales, humpback whales, sea otters and other local marine mammals, open seasonally
Whistler Museum and Archives	Whistler	Squamish-Lillooet	Multiple	website, area's natural, cultural history, sports
White Post Auto Museum	Tappen	Columbia-Shuswap	Automobile	website, indoor and outdoor displays of antique and classic automobiles
White Rock Museum and Archives	White Rock	Metro Vancouver	History	website, local history
Windermere Valley Museum	Invermere	East Kootenay	Open air	website, includes train station, schoolhouse, cabins, general store
Xá:ytem Longhouse Interpretive Centre	Mission	Fraser Valley	First Nations	
Yale Historic Site	Yale	Fraser Valley	History	website, local history, 1870s 'Creighton House' museum, living history demonstrations
Zeballos Heritage Museum	Zeballos	Strathcona	History	Local history

== Defunct museums ==
- 83 Mile House Farm Equipment Museum and Historic Site, 70 Mile House, contents auctioned off in 2012
- Bug Lab, New Westminster
- Centre of the Universe - Dominion Astrophysical Observatory, Saanich, closed in 2013, public star-gazing events on specified dates
- Granville Island Model Trains Museum, Vancouver, closed in 2008
- Granville Island Sport Fishing Museum, Vancouver
- Lytton Museum, Lytton, destroyed in Lytton wildfire
- New Westminster Police Museum, closed in 2015, displays now part of the New Westminster Museum
- Royal London Wax Museum, Victoria, website, closed in 2010
- Storyeum, Vancouver

== See also ==
- Nature centres in British Columbia
