= Kateen River =

Coordinates: 54°38′08″N 129°50′20″W

The Kateen River is a river in the Kitimat Ranges of the North Coast region of British Columbia, flowing southwest into the Khutzeymateen River a few miles before its entry to the sea at the head of Khutzeymateen Inlet. The river is within Khutzeymateen Provincial Park.

Kateen Indian Reserve No. 39 is located on the river upstream from its confluence with the Khutzeymateen, while Khutzemateen Indian Reserve No. 49 is located at the confluence. Both are under the governance of the Lax Kw'alaams band government.

== See also ==
- List of rivers of British Columbia
