= Gay Island (British Columbia) =

Island located at North Coast Regional District, British Columbia, Canada

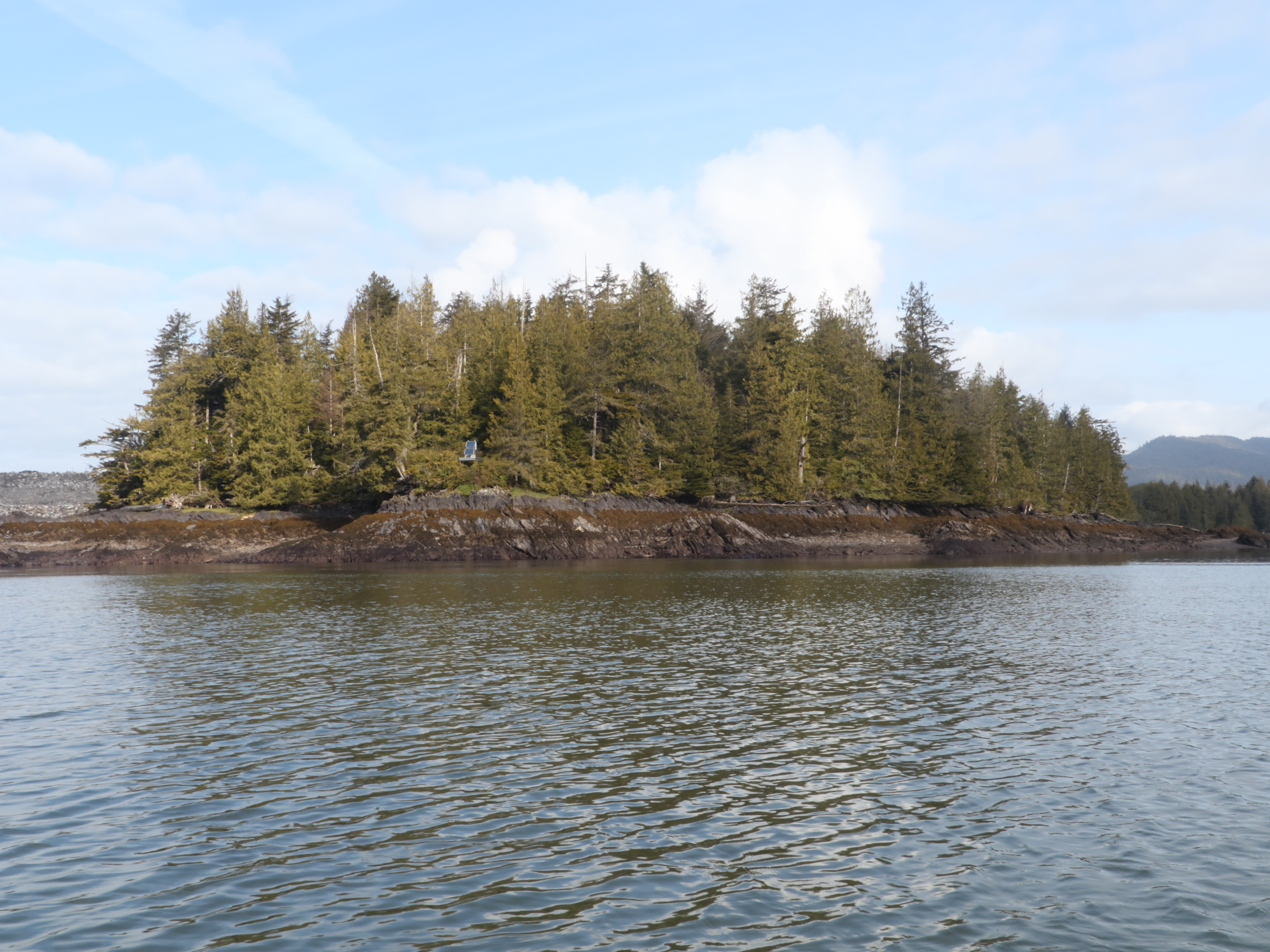
- Interactive map of Gay Island
- Other name: Île Gay

Geography
- Coordinates: 54.214722°N 130.296389°W
- Type: Island

Administration
- Canada
- District: North Coast Regional District
- Province: British Columbia

Additional information
- Time zone: UTC-7

Gay Island (in French: Île Gay) is an island located in the Skeena-Queen Charlotte Regional District, British Columbia, in the southwestern part of the country, 3,900 km west of Ottawa, the nation's capital.
