= Khutzeymateen Provincial Park =

Provincial park in British Columbia

- Khutzeymateen/K'tzim-A-Deen Grizzly Sanctuary
- IUCN category Ib (wilderness area)
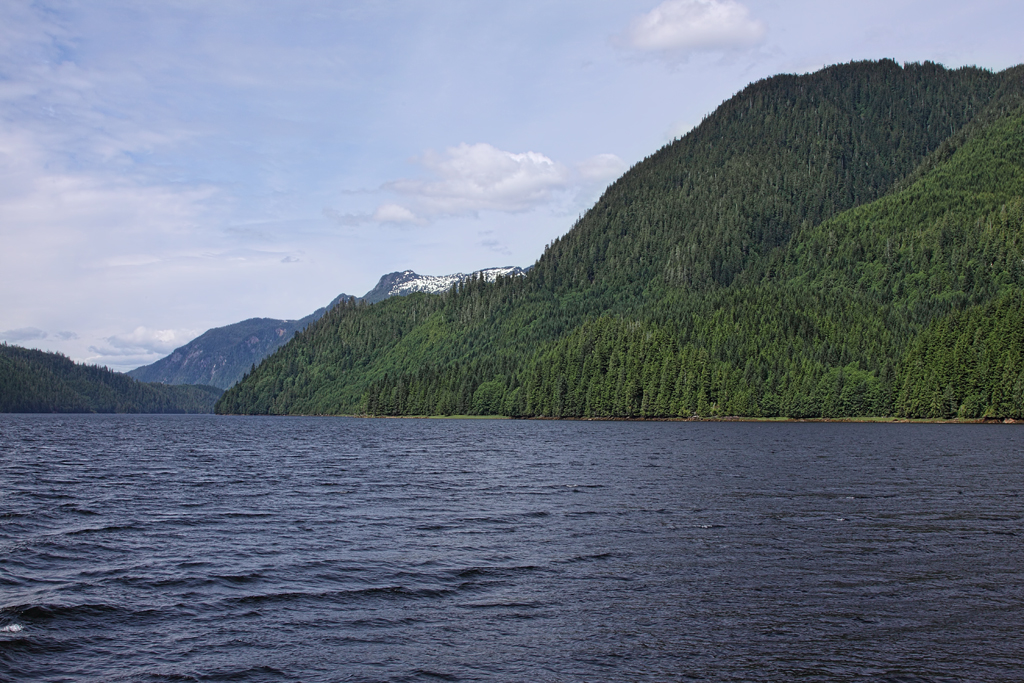
- Khutzeymateen Inlet

- Location within British Columbia
- Interactive map of Khutzeymateen Provincial Park
- Location: British Columbia, Canada
- Nearest city: Prince Rupert
- Coordinates: 54°38′00″N 129°46′31″W
- Area: 45,052 hectares (111,330 acres)
- Designation: Provincial Park
- Established: August 15, 1994
- Governing body: BC Parks
- Website: BC Parks Khutzeymateen

Khutzeeymateen Provincial Park, also known as Khutzeymateen/K'tzim-A-Deen Grizzly Sanctuary, is a Class A provincial park located in the North Coast region of British Columbia, Canada. The park, within the purview of BC Parks, was established on August 15, 1994, to protect critical habitat for the region's grizzly bear population and the largest contiguous stand of old-growth Sitka spruce in the world. It was officially opened by Prince Philip, Duke of Edinburgh, on August 17, 1994.

== Geography ==
Khutzeeymateen Provincial Park is located in the northern Kitimat Ranges, at the head of Khutzeymateen Inlet, approximately 37 km (23 mi) northeast of Prince Rupert. It borders Ksi X'anmaas Conservancy, the Ksi X'anmas watershed, to the north, Khutzeymateen Inlet Conservancy to the west, and, to the south, Khyex Conservancy, covering the Khyex River watershed. The park protects 44,588 hectares (110,180 acres) of upland and 464 hectares (1,150 acres) of foreshore in the drainage basin of the Khutzeymateen River. It is the first undisturbed estuary of its size to be protected along the north coast of BC.

== History ==
The area that is now Khutzeymateen Provincial Park had been designated for logging when, in 1982, wildlife biologist and conservationist Wayne McCrory received an anonymous tip about a "unique valley" on the northwest coast. McCrory visited the inlet in October of that year, accompanied by bear researchers Stephen herrero and Ralph Archibald. "Overwhelmed" by what they saw, the team decided to campaign to protect it. A 300 km (185 mi) hunting ban was established around the inlet and the provincial Crown commissioned a study into ways of logging without harming grizzlies.

The preserve was created at the urging, and with the assistance, of Prince Philip, Duke of Edinburgh, the husband and consort of Elizabeth II, Queen of Canada. Researchers worked with Philip, who was also President of the World Wildlife Fund, and the Lax-kw'alaams First Nation to secure its protection. The Prince, with 13 Tsimshian hereditary chiefs, opened the Khutzeeymateen Provincial Park on August 17, 1994, two days after it was established by order-in-council of the Queen's representative, Lieutenant Governor of British Columbia David Lam, on the advice of his Premier, Mike Harcourt.

The Khutzeymateen Inlet Conservancy was established in 2008 with the aim of enhancing and ensuring the protection of important grizzly bear intertidal and foreshore habitats throughout the inlet, as well as protecting and maintaining biological diversity and natural environments; preserving social, ceremonial, and cultural uses of First Nations (Coast Tsimshian depend on this area); maintaining recreational values; and ensuring that development or use of natural resources occurs in a sustainable manner.

The park is the first area in Canada created specifically to protect grizzly bears and their habitat. Though this prevented hundreds of grizzly deaths in British Columbia each year, dozens are still killed as a result of poaching, vehicle collisions, and government-sanctioned animal control.

== Activities ==
All visitors entering the sanctuary by boat are required to check-in at the K'tzim-a-deen Ranger Station, located in the inlet. Due to the ecological importance of the park, activities are limited to guided tours of the river estuary and a limited amount of controlled wildlife viewing from the inlet; shore access is forbidden. Land use is strictly prohibited.
