= Ksi X'anmas =

River in British Columbia

Ksi X'anmas Kwinamass River
- Mouth of Ksi X'anmas

Location
- Country: Canada
- Province: British Columbia
- District: Range 5 Coast Land District

Physical characteristics
- Source: Near Lachballach Lake
  - location: Coast Mountains
  - coordinates: 54°49′22″N 129°40′16″W
  - elevation: 1,625 m (5,331 ft)
- Mouth: Kwinamass Bay
  - location: Portland Inlet
  - coordinates: 54°46′30″N 130°9′0″W
  - elevation: 0 m (0 ft)
- Length: 54 km (34 mi)
- Basin size: 308 km^{2} (119 sq mi),
- Discharge
  - average: 39.8 m^{3}/s (1,410 cu ft/s)

Basin features
- Tributaries
  - left: Talahaat Creek
- Topo map: NTS103J16 Pearse Island

Ksi X'anmas (English pronunciation: se-hun-MAS), formerly the Kwinamass River, is a river in the northern coast part of the province of British Columbia, Canada, and within the Great Bear Rainforest. From its source near Lachballach Lake in the Coast Mountains Ksi X'anmas flows west for about 54 km (34 mi) to empty into Kwinamass Bay on the southeast side of Portland Inlet, near the border between British Columbia and Alaska.

Ksi X'anmas's drainage basin covers 308 km^{2} (119 sq mi). The river's mean annual discharge is estimated at 39.8 m^{3}/s (1,410 cu ft/s). Ksi X'anmas's watershed's land cover is classified as 50.4% conifer forest, 16.5% barren, and small amounts of other cover. The mouth of Ksi X'anmas is located about 50 km (31 mi) north of Prince Rupert, about 115 km (71 mi) southeast of Ketchikan, Alaska, about 490 km (300 mi) west of Prince George, and about 780 km (480 mi) north of Vancouver.

The entire Ksi X'anmas watershed is within the Ksi X'anmaas Conservancy. At the river's mouth there are two Indian reserves, called Knames 45 and Knames 46. The area around the mouth of the river is a historic locality called Txaalaxhatkw. It was "Talahaat Indian Reserve 16" until the Nisga'a Treaty went into effect in 2000.

Ksi X'anmas lies within the traditional territory of the Nisga'a and the Coast Tsimshian Lax-kw'alaams and Metlakatla First Nations. The Nisga'a term X’anmas refers to the entire watershed, while Ksi indicates water flowing from the area, or the river itself. The name "Ksi X’anmas" means "water of where it is red", since the area was known for its red ochre (mis'aws).

== Geography ==
Ksi X'anmas originates in the high peaks of the Kitimat Ranges near Lachballach Lake. It flows through Lachballach Lake and by a historic indigenous site called Lax Bilak, formerly the Indian Reserves "Lakbelak Lake 40", "Lakbelak Creek 39", and "Lakbelak 38". The Nisga'a Treaty extinguished these reserves, transferred them to fee-simple interest lots, and assigned the name "Lax Bilak" to the locality. From Lachballach Lake the Ksi X'anmas flows generally west. It collects numerous tributary streams, only one of which has an official name. That being Talahaat Creek, which joins Ksi X'anmas from the south, about 5 km (3.1 mi) above the mouth of Ksi X'anmas.

Ksi X'anmas empties into Kwinamass Bay, an inlet extending east from the northern end of Steamer Passage close to the junction of Steamer Passage and Portland Inlet. At the mouth of Ksi X'anmas are two historic indigenous sites called Txaalaxhatkw, formerly "Talahaat Indian Reserve 16", and X'anmas, formerly "Kinnamax Indian Reserve 15", until the Nisga'a Treaty took effect in 2000. Also located at or near the mouth of Ksi X'anmas are the Indian Reserves "Knames 45" and "Knames 46" of the Lax-kw'alaams First Nation.

Notable named mountains in or along the edge of Ksi X'anmas's watershed include Xk'aat'aapgwit, a Nisga'a name meaning "the highest, sharp peak", Kwinamass Peak, and Lluvia Peak. The entire watershed is within the Ksi X'anmaas Conservancy. Adjoining and just south of the upper watershed is Khutzeymateen Provincial Park, also called the Khutzeymateen/K'tzim-a-deen Grizzly Sanctuary. Adjoining the lower Ksi X'anmas watershed to the south is the Khutzeymateen Inlet Conservancy.

== History ==
Historically the Ksi X'anmas territory was rich in fur-bearing animals, seafoods, salmon, and other food resources. There were several smokehouses and longhouses during the early contact era. The Nisga'a chief allowed some Tsimshian people to fish the river. The Ksi X'anmas Conservancy was established in 2008.

== Flora and fauna ==
The primary biogeoclimatic zone of the Ksi X'anmas watershed is "Coastal Western Hemlock" (CWH) zone, subzone "Very Wet Maritime", a conifer temperate rainforest dominated by western hemlock, western red cedar, and amabilis fir. At higher altitudes this zone merges into the "Mountain Hemlock" (MH) zone, characterized by the presence of mountain hemlock and the absence of red cedar.

The Ksi X'anmas watershed provides habitat for a wide variety of wildlife including grizzly bears, black bears, wolves, waterfowl, eagles, spawning salmon and steelhead, and deer. The adjacent marines waters support various animals including humpback whales, orcas, Dall's porpoises, Pacific white-sided dolphins, sea lions, and harbour seals.

There are low mountain passes between the Khutzeymateen/K’tzim-a-deen Grizzly Bear Sanctuary and the Ksi X'anmas Conservancy. Grizzlies use both watersheds and travel between them. Both provide important habitats with rich food sources for grizzly bears.

== See also ==
- List of rivers of British Columbia
