= Khutzeymateen River =

River in Canada

Coordinates: 54°37′31″N 129°54′00″W

The Khutzeymateen River is a river in the North Coast region of British Columbia, flowing west to the head of Khutzeymateen Inlet, which opens into Portland Inlet to the northwest of the City of Prince Rupert. Within its basin is a provincial park, Khutzeymateen/K'tzim-a-deen Grizzly Sanctuary also known as Khutzeymateen Provincial Park. The Kateen River is a tributary of the Khutzeymateen.

Khutzemateen Indian Reserve No. 49 is located at the confluence of the Kateen and Khutzeymateen. Also on the river is Carm Creek Indian Reserve No. 38, which is at the mouth of Carm Creek. Both are under the governance of the Lax Kw'alaams band government.

== See also ==
- List of rivers of British Columbia
