= Jennifer 8 =

1992 American film by Bruce Robinson

- Theatrical release poster
- Directed by: Bruce Robinson
- Written by: Bruce Robinson
- Produced by: Scott Rudin
- Starring: Andy García; Uma Thurman; Lance Henriksen; Kathy Baker; Graham Beckel; Kevin Conway; John Malkovich
- Cinematography: Conrad Hall
- Edited by: Conrad Buff IV
- Music by: Christopher Young
- Distributed by: Paramount Pictures
- Release date: November 6, 1992
- Running time: 106 minutes (UK); 125 minutes (US)
- Country: United States
- Language: English
- Budget: $20 million
- Box office: $11.3 million (US/Canada)

Jennifer 8 is a 1992 American neo-noir thriller film written and directed by Bruce Robinson and starring Andy García, Uma Thurman, Lance Henriksen, Kathy Baker, and John Malkovich. Its plot focuses on a police detective investigating the murder of an unidentified young woman in a small Northern California town.

== Plot ==
Los Angeles police detective John Berlin is teetering toward burnout after the collapse of his marriage. At the invitation of an old friend and colleague, Freddy Ross, Berlin heads to rural Northern California for a job with the Eureka police force. Berlin rankles his new colleagues, especially John Taylor, who was the lead homicide detective for the unsolved homicide investigation concerning young woman found with her head and hands missing.

After finding a woman's severed hand in a garbage bag at the local dump, Berlin reopens the case of an unidentified murdered girl, nicknamed "Jennifer," which went unsolved despite a full-time six-month effort by the department. Berlin notes an unusually large number of scars on the hand, as well as wear on the finger-tips, which he realizes came from reading Braille, determining that the victim is blind. He begins to believe the cases are related. Berlin does his best to convince Freddy and his fellow officers of his suspicions, but Taylor and police chief Citrine refuse to believe that the hand found at the dump is in any way connected to the other case.

After consulting his former colleagues in Los Angeles, Berlin discovers that in the previous four years, six women, most of them blind, have either been found dead or are still missing, all within a 300-mile radius of San Diego. He becomes convinced that "Jennifer" was the seventh victim and the girl whose hand was found at the dump is "Jennifer 8", or victim #8. While investigating the links between the dead and missing blind girls, he meets blind music teacher Helena Robertson, determining that her roommate Amber was the eighth victim. Berlin becomes obsessed with the case, despite an almost complete lack of hard evidence, and becomes romantically involved with Helena, who resembles his ex-wife.

After an attack on Helena, Ross accompanies Berlin on a stakeout at the institute where Helena lives in a dorm, after leaving Helena with Ross' wife Margie. When they see a flashlight shining on the same floor as Helena's apartment, Berlin investigates and is knocked unconscious by the killer, who then shoots and kills Ross with Berlin's weapon. A grueling interrogation of Berlin by FBI Special Agent St. Anne ensues. St. Anne makes clear to Berlin that he figures him for Ross's murderer, but also inadvertently reveals information which helps Berlin realize that Taylor is the true killer. Berlin tells St. Anne and Citrine who he believes the killer to be, but his deductions are met with disbelief. Berlin is arrested for Ross's murder, but is bailed out by Margie, who does not believe that Berlin is the killer.

Upon making bail, Berlin returns to Margie's house only to learn that she has taken Helena back to the institute. Fearing that Helena and Margie are in danger, Berlin rushes to the institute. He fails to arrive ahead of Taylor, who breaks in and chases Helena through the dorm. Finally catching up to her, Taylor is shocked to discover that the woman he'd been pursuing is actually Margie. She shoots Taylor dead, avenging her husband and closing the case. Berlin and Helena are reunited, bounded by the traumatic experience and the promise of a new beginning. Despite the losses and the suffering, Berlin finds redemption by exposing the true killer and ensuring justice is served. the story concludes with Berlin and Helena embracing, symbolizing the hope for a better future.

== Cast ==
- Andy García as Sergeant John Berlin
- Uma Thurman as Helena Robertson
- Lance Henriksen as Sergeant Freddy Ross
- Kathy Baker as Margie Ross
- Bryan Larkin as Bobby Ross
- Kevin Conway as Chief Citrine
- Graham Beckel as Sergeant John "J.K." Taylor
- Lenny Von Dohlen as Blattis
- Perry Lang as Travis
- Bob Gunton as Director Goodridge
- John Malkovich as FBI Agent St. Anne
- Paul Bates as Venables
- Nicholas Love as Bisley
- Michael O'Neil as Serato

== Production ==
The film was originally titled A Policeman’s Story.

While establishing scenes were shot in Eureka and Trinidad, California, most filming took place in various municipalities of Greater Vancouver, British Columbia, including: Riverview Hospital in Coquitlam,Richmond for the rural London Heritage Farm and for the Marine Garage in Steveston, and's, Maple Ridge for the dump and for "John Berlin's" farmhouse at Jackson Farm. The film's sets were designed by the art director Richard Macdonald.

Bruce Robinson later said that the film had been hurt by studio interference: "There were four different heads of studio on that movie, they all wanted different things. The worst thing happened before we made the movie and that was having Andy (García), great guy that he is, on the movie. I didn't write it for a handsome young lead, I wrote it for a shagged out old cop like Gene Hackman or Al Pacino (...) The problem is the moment you see Andy García and Uma Thurman on screen together you think, 'That ain't bad. A couple of romantic leads, that's nice.' The whole point was that he was this fucked guy, he was Rod Steiger if you like." In an interview with Movieline, García said that twenty minutes of the film had been cut before its release. García described the cut scenes, which included his character's "all-night alcohol binge" and sections of the interrogation sequence between his and John Malkovich's character, as "the heart" of the picture, and that the edits made for "a totally different movie."

== Release ==
=== Box office ===
Produced on a $20 million budget, the film grossed $11,390,479 at the box office in the United States and Canada.

=== Critical response ===
On the review aggregator website Rotten Tomatoes, 36% of 22 critics' reviews are positive, with an average rating of 5.4/10. Metacritic, which uses a weighted average, assigned the film a score of 48 out of 100, based on 25 critics, indicating "mixed or average" reviews.

In her review for The New York Times, Janet Maslin felt the two hour running time resulted in unnecessary details unimportant to the mystery, unhelpful as its "mystery eventually proves to be its weakest element."

Todd McCarthy of Variety gave the film a favorable review, praising it as "an unusually intelligent and unexploitative late-season thriller, which probably won't help its chances at the box office. Involving without being exciting, pic is notable for avoiding most of the standard suspense film contrivances, as well as for Conrad Hall's utterly smashing cinematography."

=== Home media ===
Paramount Home Entertainment released Jennifer 8 on DVD in 2000. Scream Factory released the film on Blu-ray on January 23, 2024.
