= Vancouver Police Museum =

Canadian museum and archives in British Columbia

Coordinates: 49°16′55″N 123°05′57″W

Vancouver Police Museum & Archives

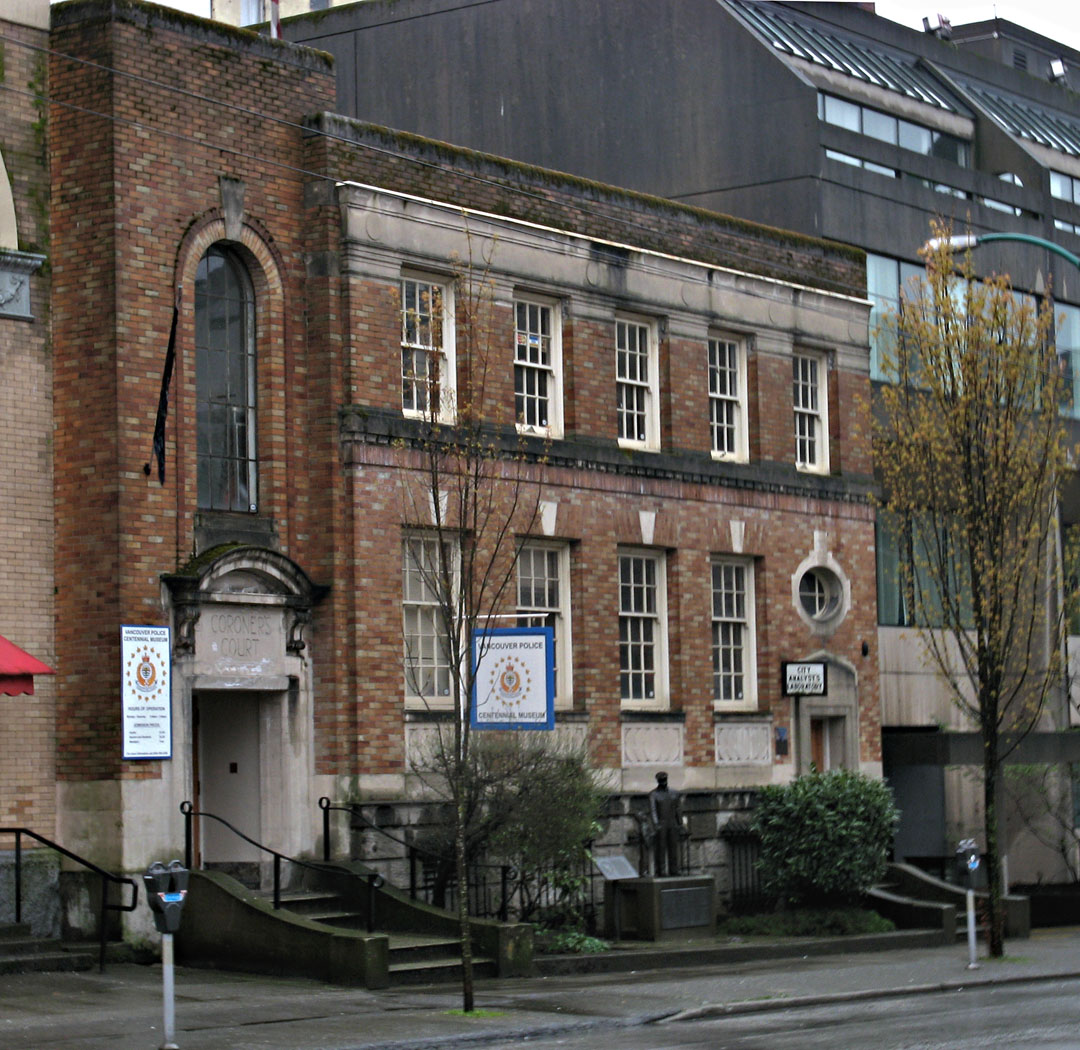
- Vancouver Police Museum & Archives, in the old Coroner's Court/City Analyst's building
- Former name: Vancouver Police Centennial Museum
- Established: 1986
- Location: 240 East Cordova Street; Vancouver, British Columbia; V6A 1L3
- Type: Police, forensics, and death and criminal investigation
- Curator: Sasha Hnatiuk
- Website: www.vancouverpolicemuseum.ca

The Vancouver Police Museum & Archives (formerly Vancouver Police Centennial Museum) opened to commemorate the centennial of the Vancouver Police Department and the City of Vancouver, British Columbia in 1986.

== Location and organisation ==
Located at 240 E. Cordova Street adjacent to Vancouver's Gastown, the museum is housed in a building that was purpose-built in 1932 for use by the City Coroner’s Services and includes the Coroner's Court, morgue and autopsy facilities (until 1980) and the City Analyst’s Laboratory (until 1996). In 1935, the Coroner's Court was used as a makeshift hospital by police during the Battle of Ballantyne Pier. It was designed by architect Arthur J. Bird, and today it is a municipally designated class "A" heritage building.

The museum is run by the Vancouver Police Historical Society, a non-profit organization established in 1983 with the mandate to foster interest in the history of the Vancouver Police Department and to open a museum for this purpose. The catalyst for the project was the museum's first curator, Joe Swan, a former police sergeant and amateur historian. Swan wrote the department's official history book, which was published by the Vancouver Historical Society in 1986, entitled, A Century of Service: The Vancouver Police, 1886-1986.

The museum is located on the top floor of the city-owned Coroner's Court building and permanent exhibits include the original morgue and autopsy suite.

== Collection and funding ==
The museum maintains a collection of approximately 30,000 objects. This includes archival documents, photographs, publications, confiscated firearms and other weapons, counterfeit currency, and various other artifacts and memorabilia, of which an estimated 40% is on display. The museum offers educational programs for children and youth that are focused on forensic investigation. The museum has a small book shop featuring a curated collection of books written by local authors and publishes a quarterly newsletter.

The museum is self-funded through admission and program fees, membership fees, donations, book shop sales, and project grants; the museum receives no direct funding from the Vancouver Police Department or the City of Vancouver but gratefully receives their in-kind support.

== See also ==
- List of heritage buildings in Vancouver
- List of museums in British Columbia
