= Khyex River =

Tributary of the Skeena River, BC, Canada

- Mouth of Khyex River

Location
- Country: Canada
- Province: British Columbia
- District: Range 5 Coast Land District

Physical characteristics
- Source: Kitimat Ranges
  - location: Coast Mountains
  - coordinates: 54°30′37″N 129°41′27″W
  - elevation: 800 m (2,600 ft)
- Mouth: Skeena River
  - coordinates: 54°13′52″N 129°48′22″W
  - elevation: 6 m (20 ft)
- Length: 50 km (31 mi)

The Khyex River is a tributary of the Skeena River in the North Coast Regional District of the province of British Columbia, Canada. It originates in the Kitimat Ranges of the Coast Mountains, and flows south about 50 km (31 mi) to the lower tidal reach of the Skeena River, about 13 km (8.1 mi) upriver from Port Essington, 35 km (22 mi) southeast of Prince Rupert, and about 85 km (53 mi) southwest of Terrace. Its watershed covers 442 km^{2} (171 sq mi), and its mean annual discharge is 458.2 m^{3}/s (16,180 cu ft/s).

Almost all of the Khyex River's watershed is contained within the Khyex Conservancy.

The Khyex River's watershed is within the asserted territory of the Tsimshian Lax-kw'alaams First Nation and the Metlakatla First Nation.

== Geography ==
The Khyex River originates in high, glaciated peaks of the Kitimat Range, such as Mount Campagnolo and Khyex Tower. The river flows south to the Skeena River, collecting a number of tributary streams, the largest of which is Arden Creek.

The Khyex River's watershed's land cover is classified as 32.4% Barren, 31.8% Coniferous, 12.4% Grassland, and 10.3% Snow/Glacier.

The Indian reserves Kyex 64, Khyex 8, Ksagwisgwas 62, and Ksagwisgwas 63 are located along the Khyex River.

== Natural history ==
The Khyex River supports of runs of salmonids including Chinook salmon, chum salmon, coho salmon, pink salmon, and steelhead trout. A 2 km (1.2 mi) long canyon with falls and chutes acts as a barrier to anadromous fish passage, blocking such fish from reaching the upper Khyex watershed. The river also supports runs of eulachon.

== See also ==
- List of rivers of British Columbia
