= Ksi X'anmaas Conservancy =

Conservancy in British Columbia, Canada

Ksi X’anmaas Conservancy
- IUCN category II (national park)
- Location within British Columbia Location within Canada
- Location: Kitimat–Stikine, British Columbia, Canada
- Nearest city: Lax̱g̱altsʼap
- Coordinates: 54°48′43″N 129°41′33″W
- Area: 33,581 hectares (335.81 km^{2})
- Elevation: 654 meters (2,146 ft)
- Established: June 27, 2008; 18 years ago
- Governing body: BC Parks

Ksi X’anmaas Conservancy is a protected area on Kitimat–Stikine, British Columbia, Canada. It is located near the northwestern coast of British Columbia, about 25 kilometres southwest of Lax̱g̱altsʼap. The conservancy was created on June 27, 2008. It encompasses the watershed of the Ksi X'anmas river.

== Geography ==
The conservancy is situated to the west of Oscar Peak and north of Khutzeymateen Provincial Park, at an average elevation of 654 metres above the sea level.
