= Nanaimo Museum =

Museum in British Columbia, Canada

Coordinates: 49°09′54″N 123°56′11″W

The Nanaimo Museum (originally the Nanaimo Centennial Museum) is a museum located in Nanaimo, British Columbia, Canada; it opened in November 1967.

== History ==
The Nanaimo Museum, originally known as the Nanaimo Centennial Museum, was established in 1967 as a legacy project for Canada's Centennial celebrations. In 2008, the museum relocated to a modern facility within the Vancouver Island Conference Centre, allowing for expanded exhibit space and updated displays.

== See also ==
- List of museums in British Columbia
- History of Nanaimo
- Snuneymuxw First Nation
- Hudson's Bay Company
