= Khutzeymateen Inlet =

Inlet in British Columbia

Coordinates: 54°39′43″N 130°04′18″W

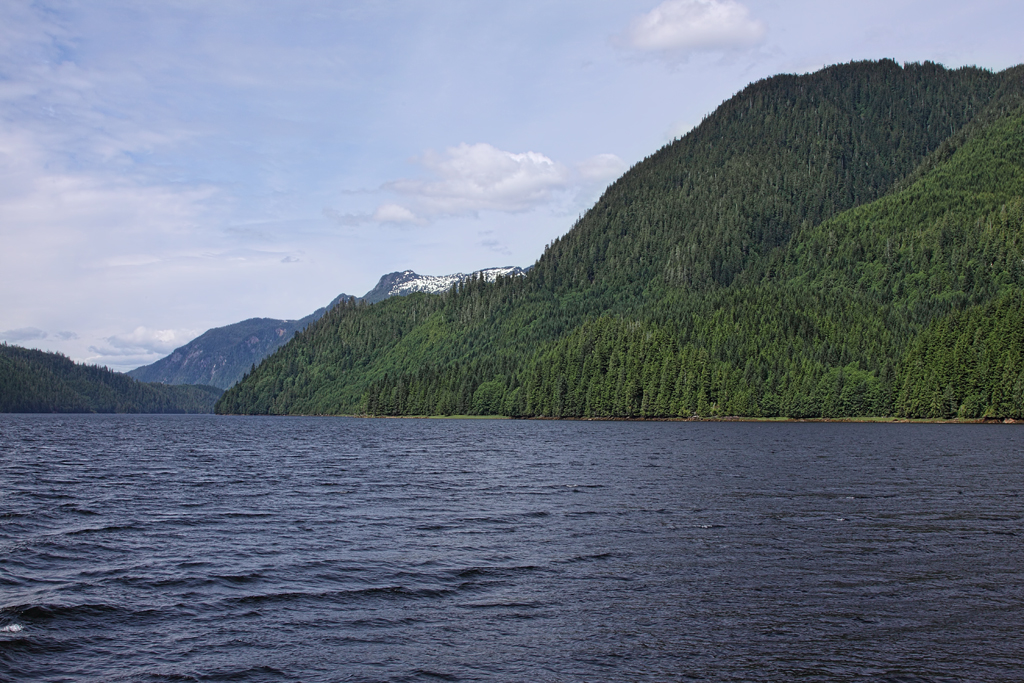
Khutzeymateen Inlet

Khutzeymateen Inlet (also spelled K’tzim-a-Deen in the Tsimshian language of the Gits'iis people) is one of the lesser principal inlets of the British Columbia Coast. It is important in being part of the first area in Canada protected to preserve grizzly bears and their habitat via the Khutzeymateen/K’tzim-a-deen Grizzly Sanctuary. The inlet and the park-sanctuary surrounding it are between the mouths of the Skeena and Nass Rivers; the Khutzeymateen is the next inlet north from Work Channel, which is the north side of the Tsimpsean Peninsula of "Greater Prince Rupert". The inlet's mouth opens onto an arm of Portland Inlet, Steamer Passage, which lies next to Sommerville Island. The entrance to Khutzeymateen Inlet is between Keemein Point and Welgeegenk Point. The closest community is Lax Kw'alaams, formerly Port Simpson.

The inlet is fed by the Khutzeymateen River. Over 50 grizzlies frequent the river and the inlet's shores, and the inlet's other wildlife includes wolves, moose, shorebirds, waterfowl, orca (killer whale), humpback whales and more.

It was first charted in 1793 by James Johnstone and Robert Barrie, two of George Vancouver’s officers during his 1791-95 expedition.
