= Fintry, British Columbia =

Fintry
- Location of Fintry in British Columbia
- Coordinates: 50°08′00″N 119°30′00″W
- Country: Canada
- Province: British Columbia
- Regional district: Central Okanagan
- Time zone: UTC−07:00 (PT)
- Area codes: 250, 778

Fintry is a small community in British Columbia, Canada. It lies on the west shore of Okanagan Lake, 24 kilometres (15 mi) north of the city of Kelowna, and 50 kilometres (31 mi) south of Vernon. It has about 50 homes and is at the bottom of a three kilometre steep winding road off West Side Road. There are a few public beaches as well as a provincial campground.

Shorts Creek, once known as the Elk River and Rivière à la Biche, is a medium sized stream that runs through the middle of the community. The creek is named after Captain Thomas Dolman Shorts, a ship captain for the Canadian Pacific Railway Lake and River Service steamboats on Okanagan Lake who was the first non-native to land at the creek and the surrounding area. Fintry Falls, accessed via a steep stairway, is located in a small canyon where Shorts Creek drops into the town toward the lake.

== Dairy farm (1924-1939) ==
The Fintry Estate, located on the western shore of Okanagan Lake, British Columbia, was a significant center for dairy innovation in the early 20th century. Established by Captain James Cameron Dun-Waters, an affluent Scotsman known as the "Laird of Fintry," the estate specialized in the breeding and distribution of Ayrshire cattle. Dun-Waters sought to introduce the hardy Scottish breed to Western Canada, believing their temperament and productivity were ideal for the region's climate.

To establish a premier "aristocrat" herd, Dun-Waters collaborated with the Earl of Stair to source elite stock from the Lochinch and Lessnessock estates in Scotland. Notable cows imported to the estate included Fintry Honeysuckle, Bumblebee, Alloway Miss Crummie, and Fintry Lucky Girl. The breeding program was anchored by prominent bulls such as Chapmanton Indicator and Noble Betsy Wylie. The quality of the Fintry herd earned a significant reputation among local creameries, leading to a robust export business.

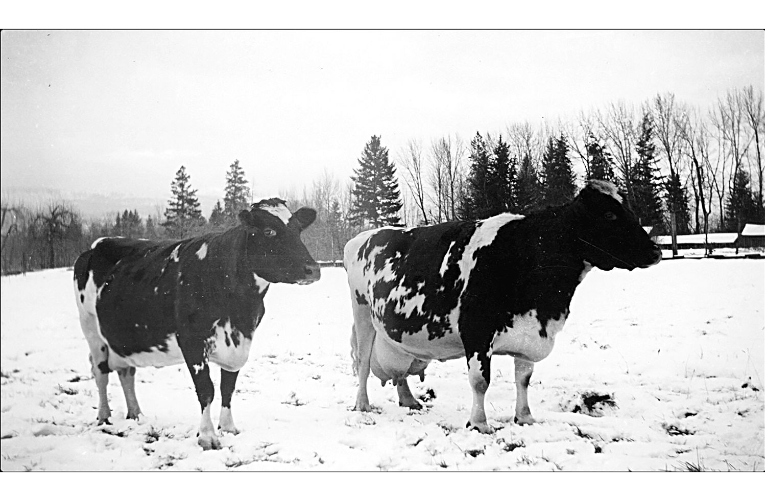
Honeysuckle and Bumblebee, Ayrshire cattle in the 1920s

The centerpiece of the dairy operation was a specialized octagonal barn. This architectural landmark was designed for maximum efficiency and sanitation; its radial layout featured a central feed distribution system and allowed for rapid waste removal. The design minimized labor while maintaining high standards of animal welfare for the prized herd.

In 1938, facing terminal illness and having no heirs, Dun-Waters transferred the estate to the Fairbridge Farm Schools Society for the symbolic sum of one dollar. He further ensured the survival of his breeding work by gifting a foundational herd to the University of British Columbia to support their agricultural department. Following his death in 1939, Dun-Waters' ashes were scattered on the hills overlooking the estate. The Ayrshires were exported to China and the provincial government assumed control.

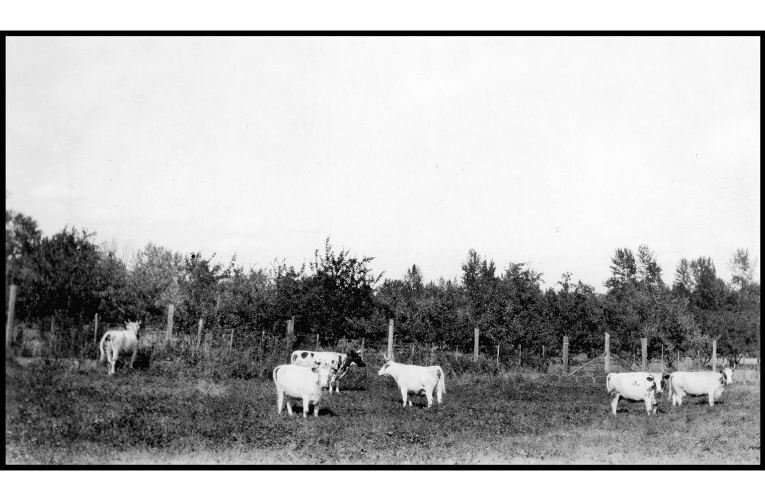
Fintry dairy cows in pasture, 1924

== See also ==
- Fintry Provincial Park
