= Fintry Provincial Park and Protected Area =

Canadian provincial park

- IUCN category III (natural monument or feature)
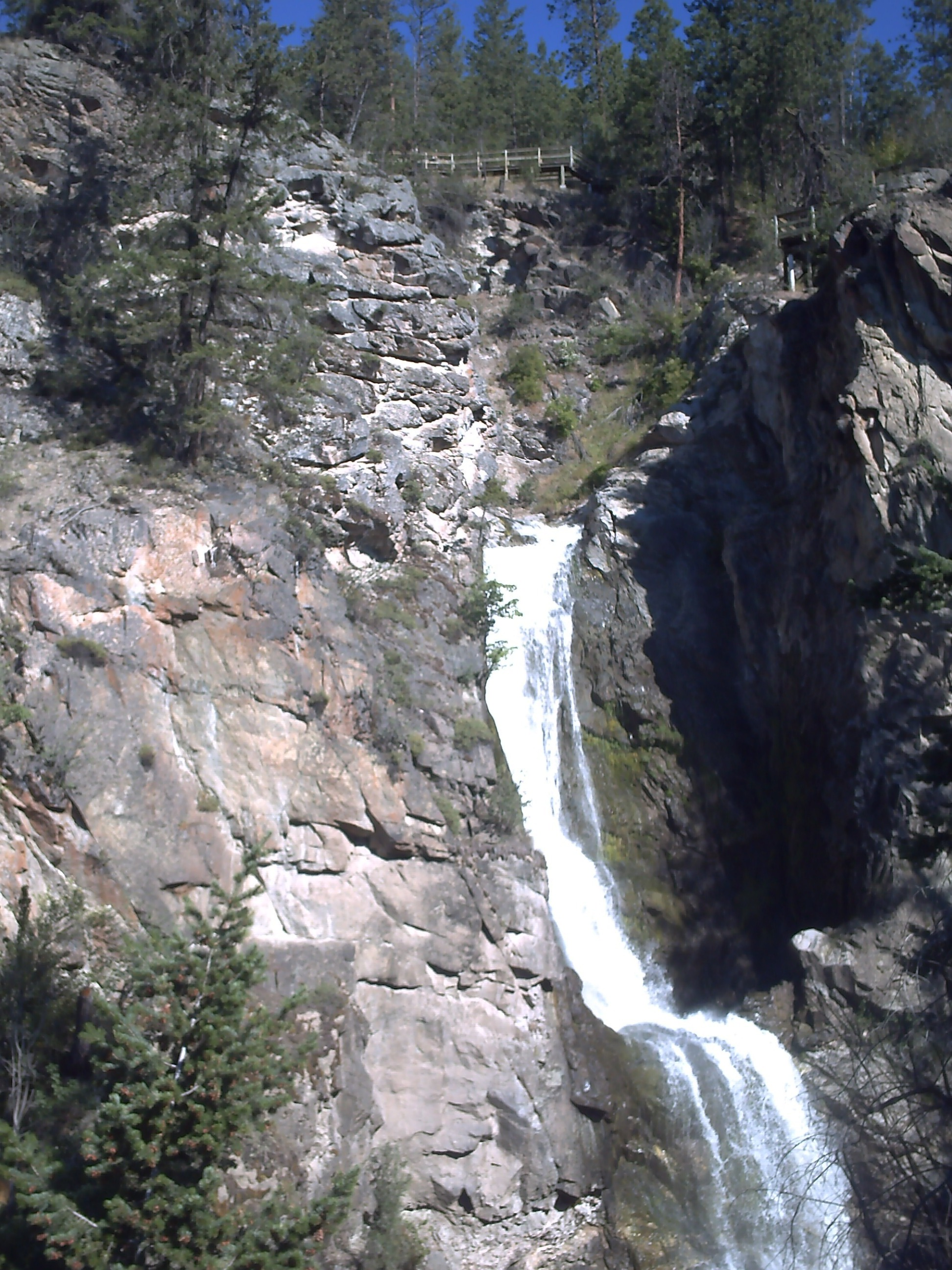
- Fintry Falls, the main attraction of the park.

- Location within British Columbia Location within Regional District of Central Okanagan
- Interactive map of Fintry Provincial Park and Protected Area
- Location: Fintry, British Columbia, Canada
- Coordinates: 50°08′16″N 119°30′38″W
- Area: 5.23 km^{2} (2.02 sq mi)
- Established: April 18, 2001
- Visitors: 107,611 (in 2017-18)

Fintry Provincial Park and Protected Area, also known as Fintry Estate, is a provincial park located in the town of Fintry, British Columbia, Canada. It is situated approximately 34 km (21 mi) north of Kelowna and 49 km (30 mi) south of Vernon on the westside of the Okanagan Lake.

The estate's original manor house and octagonal dairy barn have been restored and are open for tours in the summer.

Campsites are located in close proximity to the lake and includes a nearby dock. A hike on the opposite side of the park also features a short but steep stair-climb to Fintry Falls of Shorts Creek, the park's main feature.

== Dairy farm (1924-1939) ==
The Fintry Estate, located on the western shore of Okanagan Lake, British Columbia, was a significant center for dairy innovation in the early 20th century. Established by Captain James Cameron Dun-Waters, an affluent Scotsman known as the "Laird of Fintry", the estate was remarkably self-sufficient, utilizing a hydroelectric system powered by Pelton turbines to provide electricity and irrigation long before the surrounding region. Dun-Waters introduced Ayrshire cattle to Western Canada and sought to distribute them in the region, believing their temperament and productivity were ideal for the climate.

To establish a premier "aristocrat" herd, Dun-Waters collaborated with the Earl of Stair to source elite stock from the Lochinch and Lessnessock estates in Scotland. Notable cows imported to the estate included Fintry Honeysuckle, Bumblebee, Alloway Miss Crummie, and Fintry Lucky Girl. The breeding program was anchored by prominent bulls such as Chapmanton Indicator and Noble Betsy Wylie. The quality of the Fintry herd earned a significant reputation among local creameries, leading to a robust export business.

The centerpiece of the dairy operation was a specialized octagonal barn. This architectural landmark was designed for maximum efficiency and sanitation; its radial layout featured a central feed distribution system and allowed for rapid waste removal. The design minimized labor while maintaining high standards of animal welfare for the prized herd.

In 1938, facing terminal illness and having no heirs, Dun-Waters transferred the estate to the Fairbridge Farm Schools Society for the symbolic sum of one dollar. He further ensured the survival of his breeding work by gifting a foundational herd to the University of British Columbia to support their agricultural department. Following his death in 1939, Dun-Waters' ashes were scattered on the hills overlooking the estate. The Ayrshires were exported to China and the provincial government assumed control.

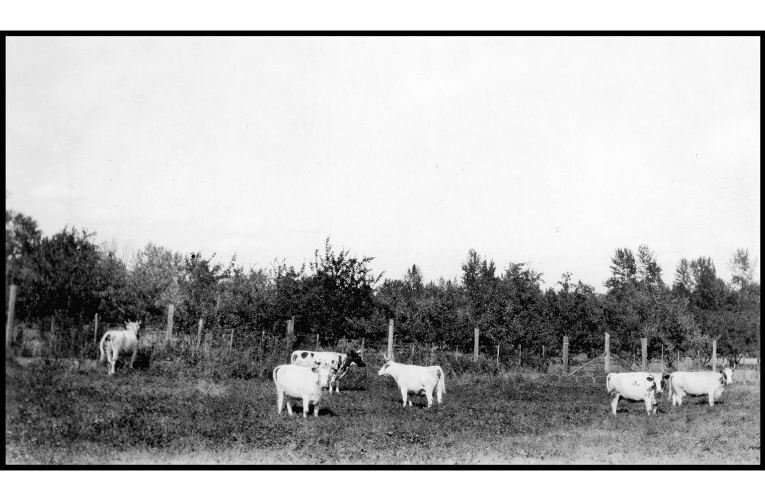
Fintry Ayrshire herd in 1924

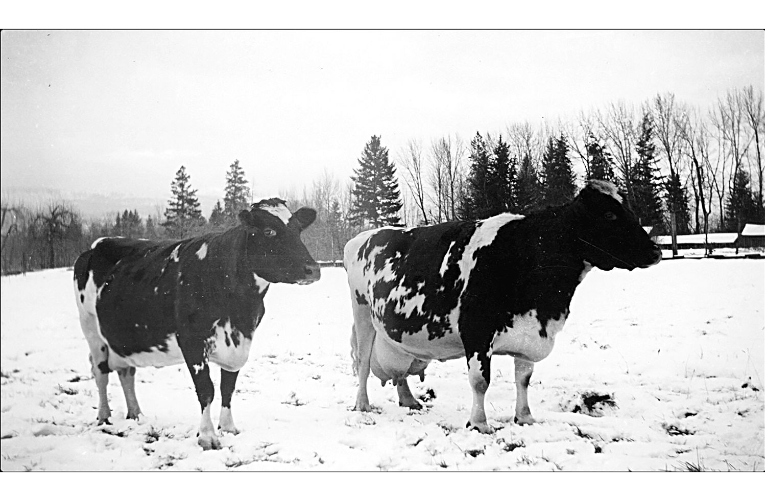
Honeysuckle and Bumblebee Ayrshire cattle, 1920s

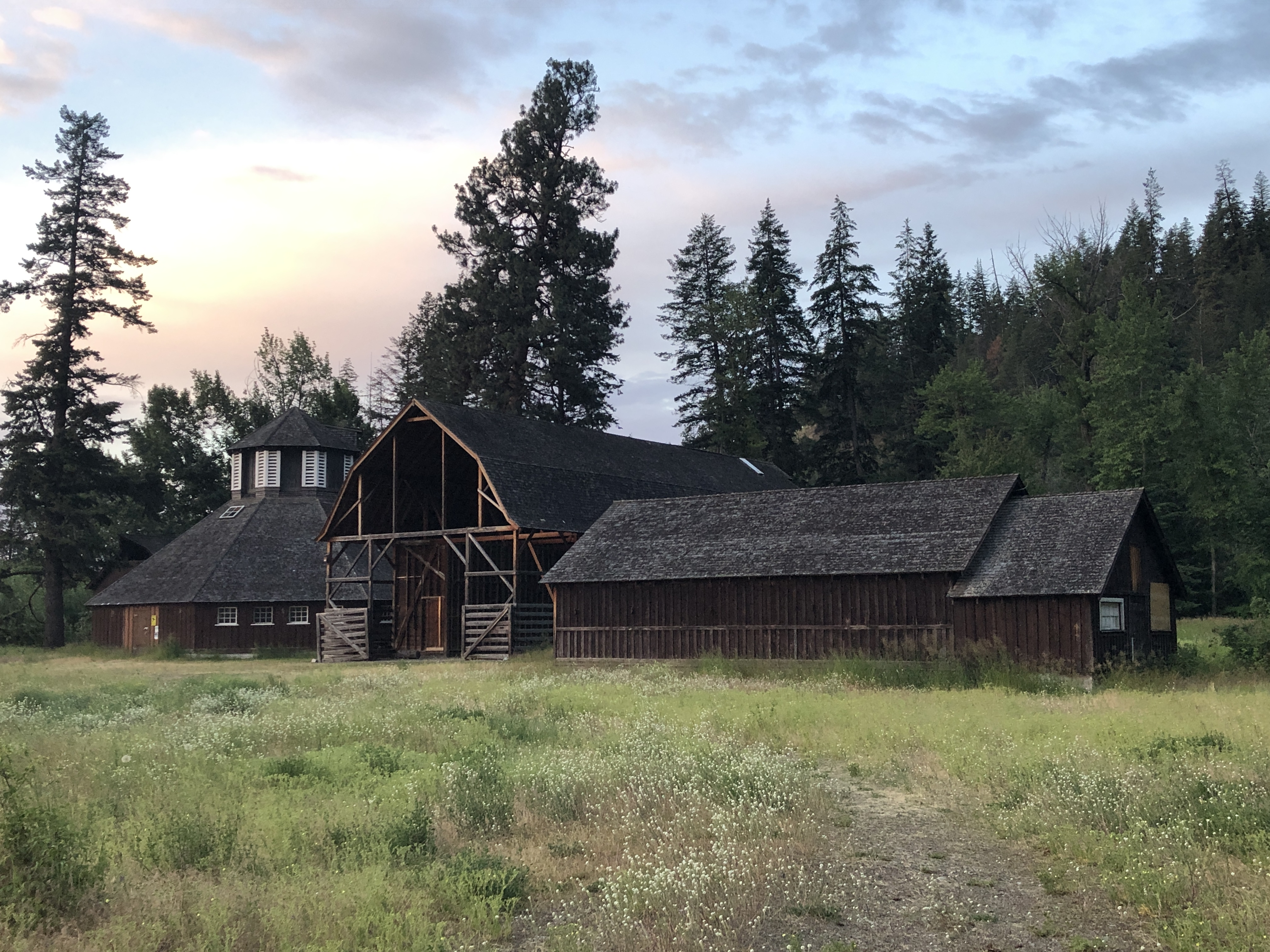
Dairy barns, 2025

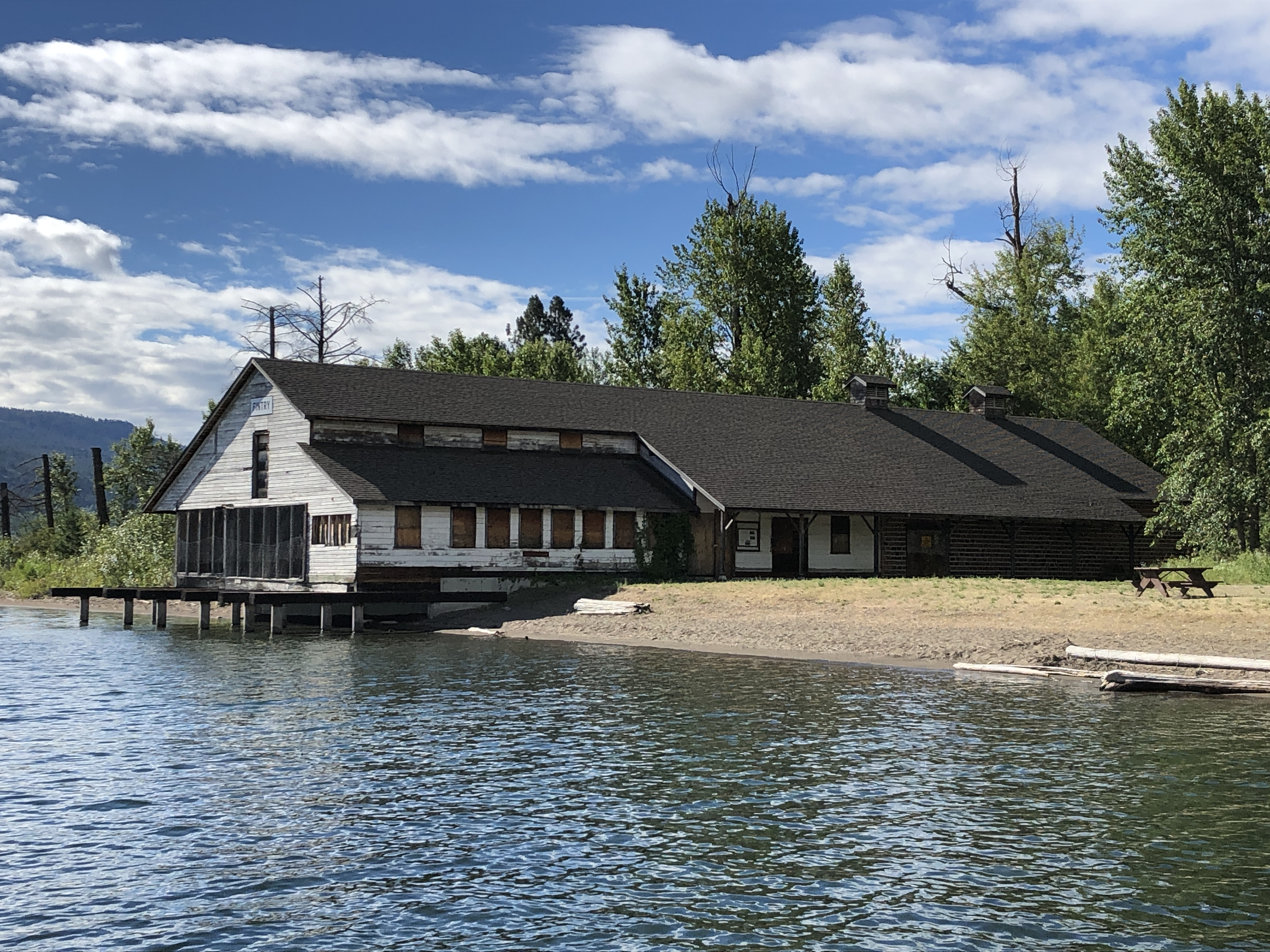
Fruit-packing house and steamship wharf, 2025
