= Lillooet Museum =

Museum and visitor's centre in British Columbia, Canada

Coordinates: 50.6913°N 121.9371°W

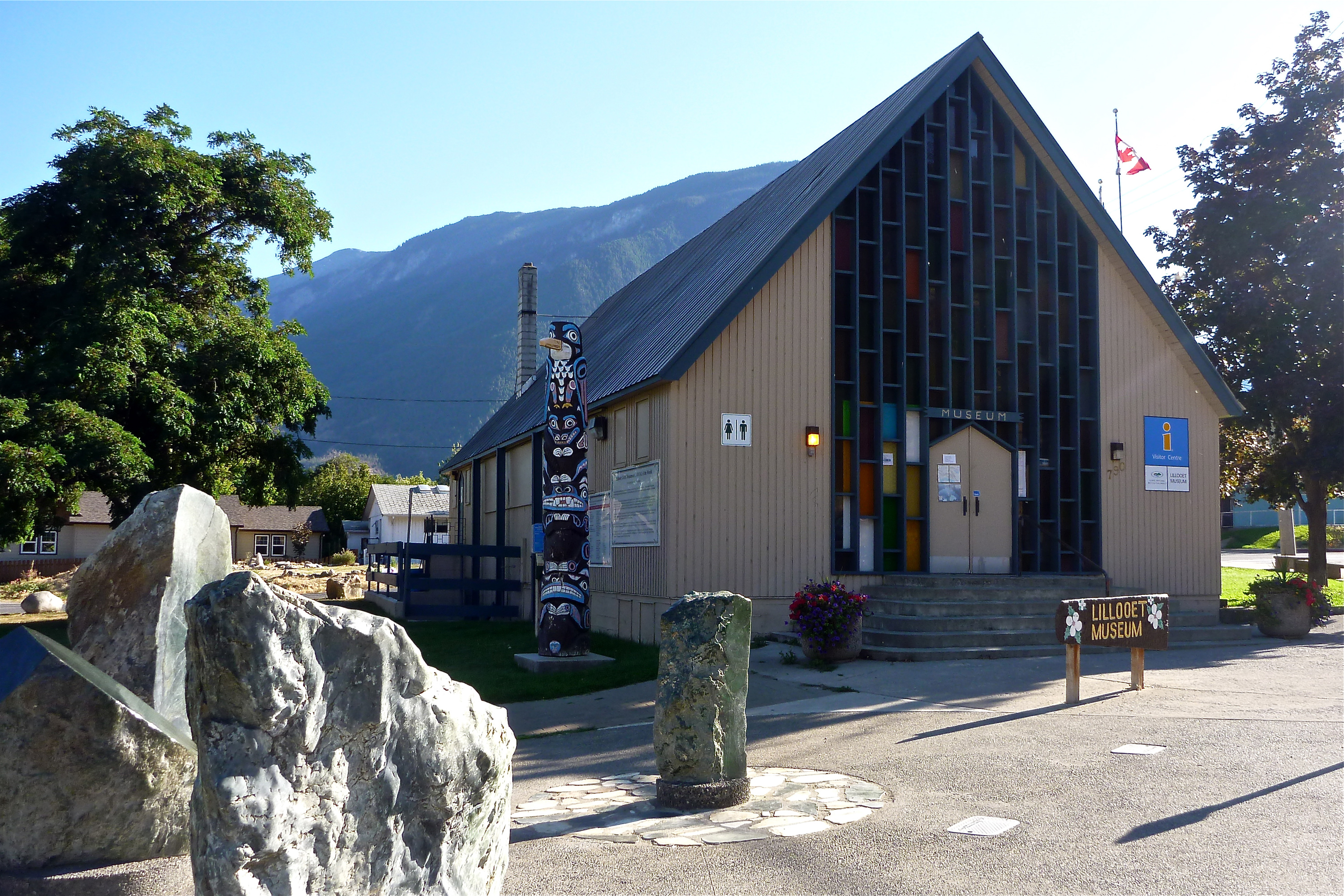
Lillooet Museum, 2011

The Lillooet Museum in Lillooet, British Columbia, Canada is located on that town's Main Street, across from the "Mile '0'" cairn marking the beginning point of the Old Cariboo Road to Alexandria in the Cariboo region.

== Holdings and displays ==
The Museum, which is also the town's official Visitor Centre, is housed in the former Anglican Church, St. Mary's the Virgin, which was built in 1961, incorporating materials from the original St. Mary's Church, built in 1860. The museum houses artifacts from the Fraser Gold Rush and the several other gold rushes in the vicinity, belongings and household items and photos from the region's families, the second largest mounted elk head trophy ever registered in British Columbia and First Nations artifacts of the St'at'imc (Lillooet people). The chancery and melodeon of the original church are on site. Also housed in the museum are the original presses, office desk and sundry from the legendary Bridge River-Lillooet News, a newspaper founded in 1933 by Margaret "Ma" Lally Murray and her husband George Matheson Murray, one-time Liberal MLA for the Lillooet riding.
