= London Heritage Farm =

Historical site in British Columbia, Canada

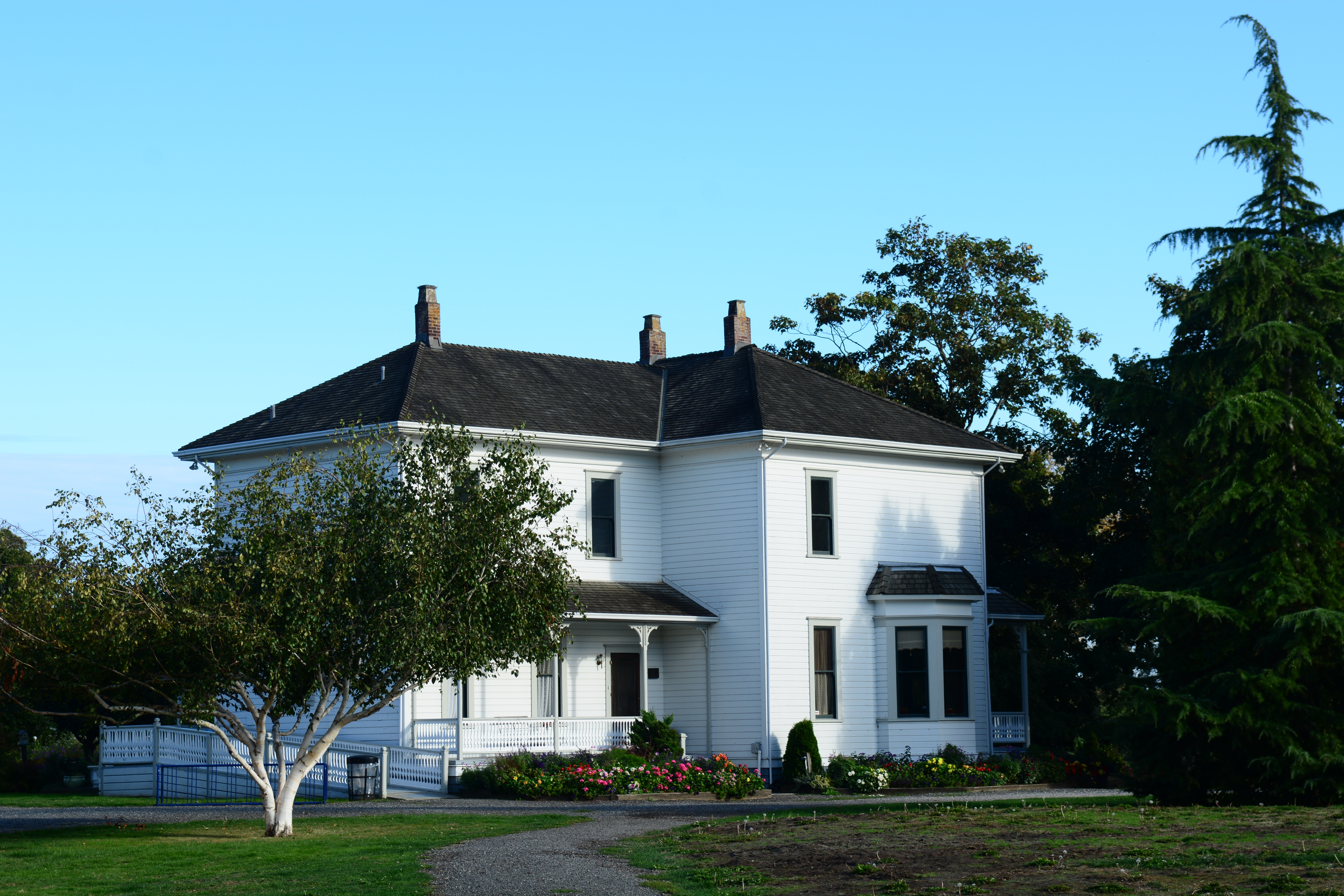
- Interactive map of London Heritage Farm
- Type: Farm
- Location: British Columbia, Canada
- Nearest city: Richmond
- Coordinates: 49.11442°N 123.1514°W
- Area: 4.06 acres (1.64 ha)
- Created: 1880s
- Operator: London Heritage Farm Society
- Website: londonfarm.ca

London Heritage Farm is a 4.06 acres (1.64 ha) historical site that contains the 1880s London family farm house and a park overlooking the south arm of the Fraser River. The farmhouse runs a tea room, gift shop and six display rooms. The grounds include heritage and herb gardens, the restored Spragg family barn, antique farming equipment, a small hand tool museum, chickens, Honey and Blue Orchard bees, community gardens/allotments and large lawns as well as picnic tables and public washrooms.

The London farmhouse has been fully restored and furnished to illustrate rural life in Richmond during the 1880 to 1930 era. Six rooms display the furniture, pictures, clothing, quilts and everyday articles of the era.

London Heritage Farm is owned by the City of Richmond and operated by the London Heritage Farm Society. Operations and improvements to the house are financed through donations, the operation of the tea room, gift shop and special events held by the Society.

The 1992 film Jennifer 8 written and directed by Bruce Robinson, starring Andy Garcia, Uma Thurman, Kathy Baker and Lance Henriksen was filmed on location here. The farm is also the setting for the MacGyver season 6 episode Faith, Hope, and Charity.

== The London Family ==
Charles Edwin London, aged 16, and his brother William, aged 17, arrived in British Columbia from Ontario in 1877. Three years later, the brothers purchased 200 acres (81 ha) of land for $2000, erected a small farmhouse and began clearing and draining the land in preparation for farming. In 1888, Charles married Henrietta Dalzeil of Dalbeattie, Scotland, and started building the farmhouse that stands today.

The farmhouse was built in two stages, with the back, northern wing being completed first and the front, southern part of the house added in the 1890s and finished in 1898. In addition to the house and farm, the London's established a general store and post office and built a wharf to receive supplies and to ship their milk and produce (hay, oats and vegetables) to New Westminster.

Charles and Henrietta London had eight children, of whom three died in infancy. Henrietta died in 1916 and the family stayed at London Farm only another three years before moving to the Marpole area of Vancouver. However, in 1921, Lucy (the London's eldest daughter) and her husband, Herbert Howse, bought the farm back. They farmed and raised their family at London Farm until 1948. Thereafter, the farmhouse was rented by a series of families until its purchase by the City of Richmond in 1978.

== The London Heritage Farm Society ==
The London Heritage Farm Society worked with the City of Richmond for several years to save the farmhouse prior to the city's purchase of the house together with four acres of original London farmland. Then, once the house and site were registered as a heritage site under the BC Heritage Act, the Society signed a 25-year operating agreement and restored the house.

The London Heritage Farm Society and the City of Richmond still work together to run and improve to the house and its environs.
