= Rotary Centre for the Arts =

Arts center in Kelowna, British Columbia, Canada

- Interactive map of the Rotary Centre for the Arts area

General information
- Location: Kelowna, British Columbia, Canada
- Coordinates: 49.8915°N 119.4950°W

Website
- http://www.rotarycentreforthearts.com/

The Rotary Centre for the Arts is a visual and performing arts centre in Kelowna, British Columbia, Canada. It is very close to the Kelowna Art Gallery, both of which are located on Cawston Avenue. The building houses the Mary Irwin Theatre, the Alternator Centre for Contemporary Art, Potters Addict Ceramic Art Centre, several other studios and a bistro that serves sandwiches and soups. Colleen Fitzpatrick is the centre's executive director. In September 2012, the centre hosted the kick-off of the Okanagan Fall Wine Festival, the annual general meeting of the Okanagan Basin Water Board, and the Kelowna Student Film Festival. In October of that year, UBC Okanagan students published a typewriter-produced zine called The Heartbreak at one of the centre's studios.

The Mary Irwin Theatre is part of the building. It hosts a portion of the annual Life and Arts Festival, which also takes place at the Kelowna Art Gallery and Laurel Building. In 2005, the theatre hosted a screening of untitled part 4: terra incognita, a documentary film by Jackie Salloum about the destruction of the culture of the Okanagan people. In 2006, the theatre hosted a March performance of Here on the Flight Path, and a May performance of thriller play Quarry. The Downtown Revitalization Initiative held an event at the theatre in 2008. In 2009, the theatre hosted the Central Okanagan Foundation's official release of a report that graded the Regional District of Central Okanagan on various community attributes, such as housing, safety, and transportation. Later that year, the theatre hosted the play Miss Muffet's Christmas Party. The Sunshine Theatre Society performed more than twenty productions at the theatre between January and April 2011. In September 2011, Sheryl MacKay taped Why Music Works at the theatre. In 2012, the theatre hosted performances of She Has a Name, a play by Andrew Kooman about human trafficking.
