= North Coast Regional District =

Regional district in British Columbia, Canada

North Coast Skeena–Queen Charlotte Regional District
- Regional district
- North Coast Regional District
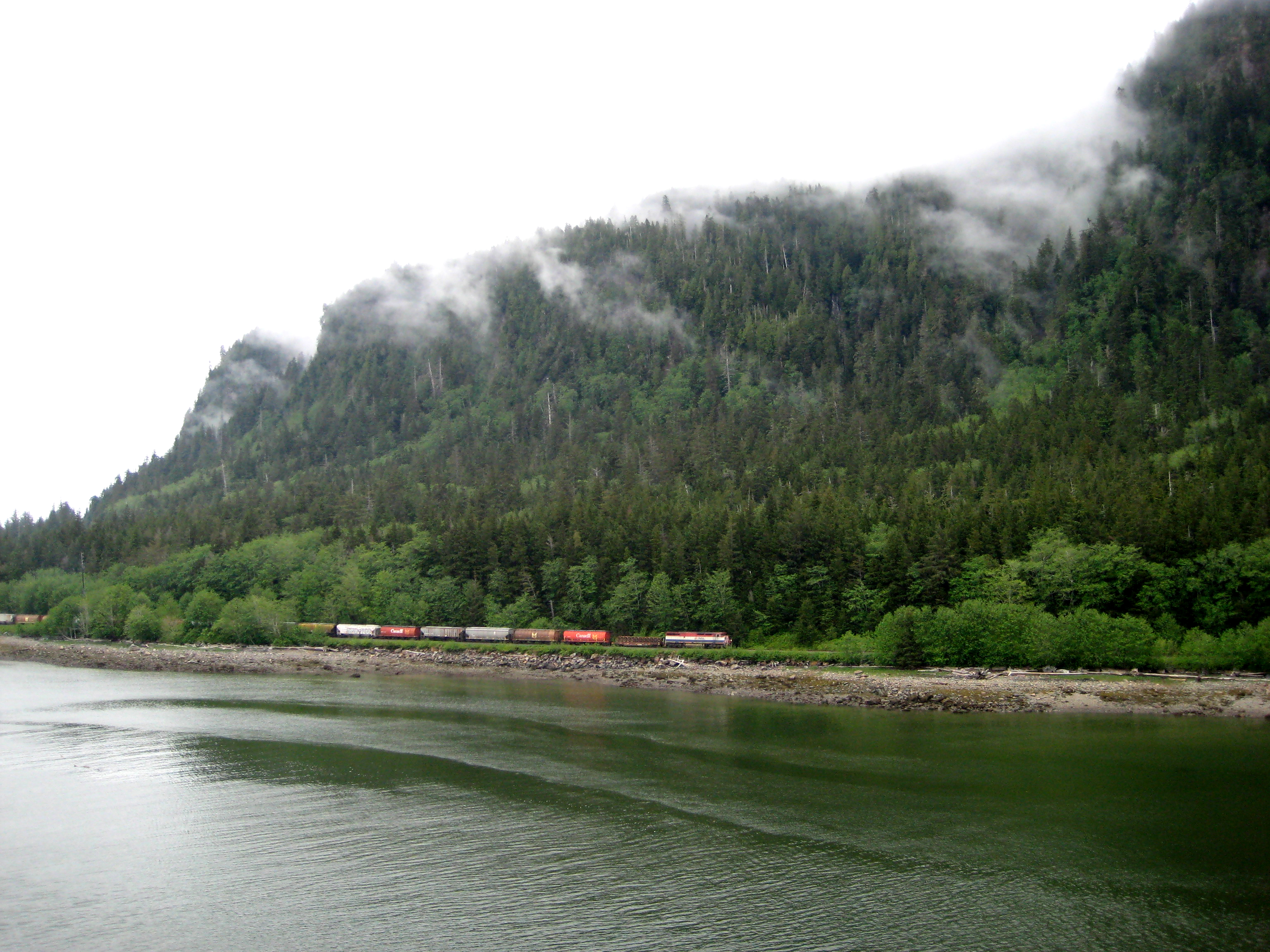
- Canadian National train entering Prince Rupert

- Logo

- Major communities

- Location in British Columbia
- Country: Canada
- Province: British Columbia
- Administrative office location: Prince Rupert

Government
  - Type: Regional district
  - Body: Board of Directors
  - Chair: Barry Pages (Masset)
  - Vice Chair: Evan Putterill (E)
  - Electoral Areas: A – Dodge Cove; C; D – Rural Graham Island; E – Sandspit

Area
  - Land: 19,775.41 km^{2} (7,635.33 sq mi)

Population (2021)
  - Total: 18,181
  - Density: 0.919/km^{2} (2.38/sq mi)
- Website: www.ncrdbc.com

The North Coast Regional District (until 2016 known as the Skeena–Queen Charlotte Regional District) is a municipal administrative area in British Columbia. It is located on British Columbia's west coast and includes Haida Gwaii (formerly the Queen Charlotte Islands), the largest of which are Graham Island and Moresby Island. Its administrative offices are in the City of Prince Rupert.

== Demographics ==
The North Coast Regional District had a population of 19,074 in 2024 according to BC Stats population estimates.

As a census division in the 2021 Census of Population conducted by Statistics Canada, the North Coast Regional District, previously the Skeena–Queen Charlotte Regional District, had a population of 18,181 living in 7,661 of its 9,082 total private dwellings, a change of 0.3% from its 2016 population of 18,133. With a land area of 19,710.3 km^{2} (7,610.2 sq mi), it had a population density of 0.9/km^{2} (2.4/sq mi) in 2021.

Panethnic groups in the North Coast Regional District (1996−2021)
Panethnic group	2021		2016		2011		2006		2001		1996	
Panethnic group	Pop.	%	Pop.	%	Pop.	%	Pop.	%	Pop.	%	Pop.	%
European (Note: Statistic includes all persons that did not make up part of a visible minority or an indigenous identity.)	8,275	45.98%	8,215	45.91%	9,085	48.98%	10,105	51.58%	12,175	56.46%	14,400	58.28%
Indigenous	7,670	42.62%	8,035	44.9%	7,980	43.02%	7,985	40.76%	7,700	35.71%	8,120	32.86%
Southeast Asian (Note: Statistic includes total responses of "Filipino" and "Southeast Asian" under visible minority section on census.)	860	4.78%	700	3.91%	580	3.13%	410	2.09%	635	2.94%	850	3.44%
South Asian	660	3.67%	420	2.35%	410	2.21%	540	2.76%	550	2.55%	620	2.51%
East Asian (Note: Statistic includes total responses of "Chinese", "Korean", and "Japanese" under visible minority section on census.)	220	1.22%	355	1.98%	345	1.86%	405	2.07%	370	1.72%	505	2.04%
Middle Eastern (Note: Statistic includes total responses of "West Asian" and "Arab" under visible minority section on census.)	115	0.64%	20	0.11%	0	0%	10	0.05%	0	0%	15	0.06%
African	65	0.36%	75	0.42%	90	0.49%	75	0.38%	45	0.21%	35	0.14%
Latin American	35	0.19%	25	0.14%	0	0%	0	0%	45	0.21%	70	0.28%
Other (Note: Statistic includes total responses of "Visible minority, n.i.e." and "Multiple visible minorities" under visible minority section on census.)	95	0.53%	60	0.34%	35	0.19%	40	0.2%	65	0.3%	75	0.3%
Total responses	17,995	98.98%	17,895	98.69%	18,550	98.75%	19,590	99.62%	21,565	99.41%	24,710	99.66%
Total population	18,181	100%	18,133	100%	18,784	100%	19,664	100%	21,693	100%	24,795	100%

- Note: Totals greater than 100% due to multiple origin responses.

== Electoral areas: pop. 3,450 (2024) ==
- Area A – Skeena North:
  - Rural Communities: pop. 45 (2021)
    - Dodge Cove
    - Crippen Cove
  - Indian Reserves
    - Metlakatla: pop. 94 (2025)
    - Lax Kw'alaams: pop. 674 (2025)
- Area C – Skeena South:
  - Rural Communities: pop. 31 (2021)
    - Porcher Island
      - Oona River
      - Humpback Bay
      - Hunts Inlet
  - Indian Reserves:
    - Hartley Bay: pop. 142 (2025)
    - Kitkatla / Gitxaała: pop. 448 (2025)
- Area D – Haida Gwaii North:
  - Unincorporated Communities: pop. 580 (2021)
    - Tlell
    - Tow Hill
    - Lawn Hill
    - Miller Creek
    - North Beach
  - Indian Reserves
    - Skidegate: pop. 647 (2025)
    - Old Massett: pop. 704 (2025)
- Area E – Haida Gwaii South:
  - Unincorporated Communities: pop 325 (2021)
    - Sandspit

== Municipalities ==
- City of Prince Rupert: pop. 12,915 (2024)
- Village of Daajing Giids: pop. 992 (2024)
- Village of Masset: pop. 918 (2024)
- District of Port Edward: pop. 446 (2024)
- Village of Port Clements: pop. 353 (2024)

== First Nations Communities ==
First Nations communities within the North Coast Regional District are included within the official population figures for the regional district's electoral areas, residents of these communities have full voting rights in regional district elections; however, these populations also have elected Band Councils that represent them at the local level and indigenous national governments that represent their respective First Nations.

== Past naming ==
The Regional District had historically been called the Skeena-Queen Charlotte Regional District, referring to its location on the Skeena River and the Queen Charlotte archipelago. Once the Queen Charlottes were renamed Haidi Gwaii to reflect their Indigenous heritage, discussions began about renaming the Regional District to reflect the update. In September 2016, letters patent were granted renaming it to the North Coast Regional District

== Transportation ==
The North Coast Regional District is served by Via Rail at Kwinitsa station, on the Canadian National Railway mainline in Kwinitsa on the north side of the Skeena River across from Yellowhead highway 16. The station is located between the Khyex River and the Kasiks River. The station is served by Via Rail's Jasper – Prince Rupert train as a flag stop.
