= Lax Kwʼalaams First Nation =

Tsimshian First Nation band government in British Columbia, Canada

Lax Kwʼalaams
- Band No. 674
- Laxłguʼalaams
- People: Tsimshian
- Headquarters: Lax Kwʼalaams
- Province: British Columbia

Land
- Main reserve: Lax Kwʼalaams 1
- Land area: 164.9 km^{2} (63.7 sq mi)

Population (2024)
- On reserve: 669
- On other land: 81
- Off reserve: 3460
- Total population: 4210

Government
- Chief: Gary M. Reece

Website
- laxkwalaams.ca

Lax Kwʼalaams (Tsimshian: Laxłgu'alaams, lit. 'Place of the Wild Roses') is a Tsimshian band government, at Lax Kwʼalaams, a community near Prince Rupert in British Columbia, Canada. Band members are descendants of the Nine Tribes of the Tsimshian. As of 2024, the band has over 4,200 registered members, and 164.9 km^{2} in reserve land.

== History ==
Lax Kw'alaams derives from Laxłgu'alaams, which means "place of the wild roses." It is an ancient camping spot of the Gispaxlo'ots tribe and in 1834 became the site of a Hudson's Bay Company (HBC) trading post called Fort Simpson, then Port Simpson. The name Fort Simpson derived from Capt. Aemilius Simpson, superintendent of the HBC's Marine Department, who had established the first, short lived, Fort Simpson, on the nearby Nass River, in 1830 with Peter Skene Ogden. The first HBC factor at the new Fort Simpson was Dr. John Frederick Kennedy, who married the daughter of the Gispaxlo'ots chief Ligeex as part of the diplomacy which established the fort on Gispaxlo'ots territory. Kennedy served at Fort Simpson until 1856.

In 1857 an Anglican lay missionary named William Duncan brought Christianity to Lax Kw'alaams, but, feeling that he was competing in vain with the dissipated fort atmosphere for Tsimshian souls, he relocated about 350 of his flock to Metlakatla, at Metlakatla Pass just to the south. There was no further missionary presence at Lax Kw'alaams until the arrival of the Rev. Thomas Crosby of the Methodist church in 1874. The community is still predominantly Methodist (i.e. United Church of Canada). Crosby's wife, Emma Crosby, founded the Crosby Girls' Home in the community in the 1880s. It became part of B.C.'s residential school system in 1893 and was closed in 1948.

It was in Port Simpson in 1931 that the Native Brotherhood of British Columbia was founded as the province's first Native-run rights organization. Its four founders included the Tsimshian ethnologist William Beynon and Hereditary Chief William Jeffrey.

Duncan estimated the population of Lax Kw'alaams in 1857 as 2,300, living in 140 houses. Approximately 500 died in the 1862 Pacific Northwest smallpox epidemic, shortly after Duncan's departure. Today Lax Kw'alaams is the largest of the seven Tsimshian village communities in Canada. Its population in 1983 was 882.

The legal and political interests of the people of Lax Kw'alaams vis à vis the provincial and federal governments are represented by the Allied Tsimshian Tribes Association, which represents the hereditary chiefs of the Nine Tribes.

== Reconciliation ==
In 2020, Lax Kw'alaams began discussions with the provincial and federal governments, to begin moving away from the Indian Act, through a possible treaty. They are in active negotiation with the BC Treaty Commission.

== Demographics ==
As of 2024, Lax Kw'alaams had 4210 registered members, 3460 of whom lived off-reserve.

== See also ==
- Tsimshian
