= Emma Nelson =

Emma Nelson may refer to:

- Emma Nelson (Degrassi: The Next Generation), a fictional character in the TV series Degrassi: The Next Generation
- Emma Nelson (née Starr), matriarch of the Tsimshian people
- Emma Nelson (actress)
- Emma Nelson (Beast Games), American reality television star
