= North Coast Distance Education =

Location
- 3120 Highway 16 East; Terrace, British Columbia, V8G 4N8; Canada; 54°30′50.2″N 128°32′22.5″W

Information
- School type: Public, Distributed Learning
- Founded: 29 September 1988
- School board: School District 82 Coast Mountains
- School number: 08298009
- Principal: Geoffery McKay
- Staff: 14
- Grades: K-12
- Enrollment: 682 (30 September 2012)
- Website: ncdes.ca

North Coast Distance Education at www.ncdes.ca is a public distance education program in Northern British Columbia offering distributed learning courses to students in BC. NCDE is a member of Learn Now BC and BC Learning Network

NCDE offers courses to students of all ages from kindergarten to grade 12 and adult. Much of NCDES's student body come from the local area, but NCDE is open to enrolments from throughout the province of BC.

== History ==
NCDE was founded in 1988 as part of School District 88 and under the name "North Coast Regional Correspondence School." Later on, the name was changed and School District 88 was merged into School District 82. The opening ceremony was attended by the then BC Premier, Bill Vander Zalm and other local politicians. Initially its premises were the original Kalum school building, built in 1914. It is now spread among three separate buildings on the grounds of School District 82's offices.

== Technology ==
Originally a paper based correspondence school, NCDES has recently moved completely to online delivery of content. This is primarily through using a Moodle server with more than 1000 users. NCDES has also embraced many other technologies and has developed an active on-line presence in social media both to interact with students and to provide educational resources.

== First Nations ==
A number of First Nations bands make use of the services provided by NCDES, to augment their own educational resources. To this end, NCDES offers a number of courses with particular emphasis on First Peoples' culture.
