= Alayne Fleischmann =

Lawyer

- Born: Terrace, British Columbia, Canada
- Education: Cornell Law School
- Occupation: Lawyer

Alayne Fleischmann, a lawyer formerly employed by JPMorgan Chase, provided evidence resulting in a $13 billion settlement by JPMorgan Chase to the United States Federal Government. The case has been called one of the most significant white-collar crime cases in US history.

== Early life ==
Fleischmann was born and raised in Terrace, British Columbia, Canada. After leaving Canada, she attended Cornell Law School and then began working on Wall Street. Prior to entering the financial sector she had worked in human rights.

== Securities law ==
But, once working in securities law, she discovered she had a passion for it. She felt that, in those days, it was a "very respectable" field, and that there was "nothing shady about" it. In 2006, after working for a few years at a law firm, she was hired by Chase as a transaction manager—a sort of quality control officer. Her main function was to ensure that Chase did not purchase bad loans. After working there for a few months, a new manager was hired as head of the "diligence" group. This group's purpose was to review then clear loans.

Very quickly, Fleischmann encountered problems with the manager. She testified in a United States Department of Justice deposition that, this manager—within the organization, technically a superior—instructed her and others in the firm to stop any e-mail contact with him. Fleischmann said: "If you sent him an e-mail, he would actually come out and yell at you." "The whole point of having a compliance and diligence group is to have policies that are set out clearly in writing. So to have exactly the opposite of that – that was very worrisome."

== Home loans ==
Late 2006, shortly after the manager started the "no e-mail" policy, the diligence group, including Fleischmann, were called upon to evaluate a $900 million packet of home loans. GreenPoint was named as the mortgage originator. Almost at once, Fleischmann and several of her colleagues who were also diligence managers found serious issues with this packet of loans. One problem was the "suspiciously" old dates on many of them. Ordinarily, banks wish to produce securities from loans as quickly as possible, ideally within two to three months. The loans from GreenPoint at the time were seven or eight months old. This indicated that the deal had been rejected by Chase or another bank earlier, or else were "early payment defaults" or EPDs (loans that had been previously sold to another institution and had been returned after the borrowers had defaulted on several payments).

A review of random loan samples by Fleischmann and her team discovered approximately 40% were based on incomes that were overstated. The normal tolerance level by Chase was 5%. After Fleischmann and others stated their objections to these bad loans, the number-crunchers, who once were concerned about the loans, started to alter their reports. The diligence team concluded that there would likely be a large number of defaults in the GreenPoint package loans. The report stating this was provided to several high-ranking executives. The GreenPoint package was eventually approved.

In February 2008, as part of a series of layoffs, Fleischmann was fired.

== Canada ==
Fleischmann returned to Canada. In early 2012, the U.S. Securities and Exchange Commission contacted her as part of an investigation into Chase. She stated that she would tell them all she knew about Chase's systemic fraud, in particular, GreenPoint. However, the SEC was more concerned with Chase's dealings with a company called WMC.

In late 2012 and early 2013, civil litigators from the U.S. attorney's office in the Eastern District of California interviewed her. Fleischmann provided lead attorney Richard Elias and his team with complete information about the directive not to send e-mails, the sabotage of the diligence process, bullying by her superiors, and that written warnings were ignored. She assumed her statements would lead to prosecution. However, Eric Holder's expected September 24, 2013 announcement of civil-fraud charges against Chase were canceled.

Later news reports state that Jamie Dimon had called United States Associate Attorney General Tony West to ask that the case be settled out of court. According to The New York Times, Dimon had offered $3 billion to settle out of court, which was rejected, then offered more, which was also rejected. As a bargaining chip, Fleischmann's evidence was used by the Department of Justice to persuade Dimon to offer approximately $9 billion as a settlement.

From 2012 to 2013, she articled at a Calgary law firm. This is a prerequisite to practicing law in Canada.
