= Thornhill, British Columbia =

Thornhill
- Unincorporated Community
- Regional District of Kitimat-Stikine Area E
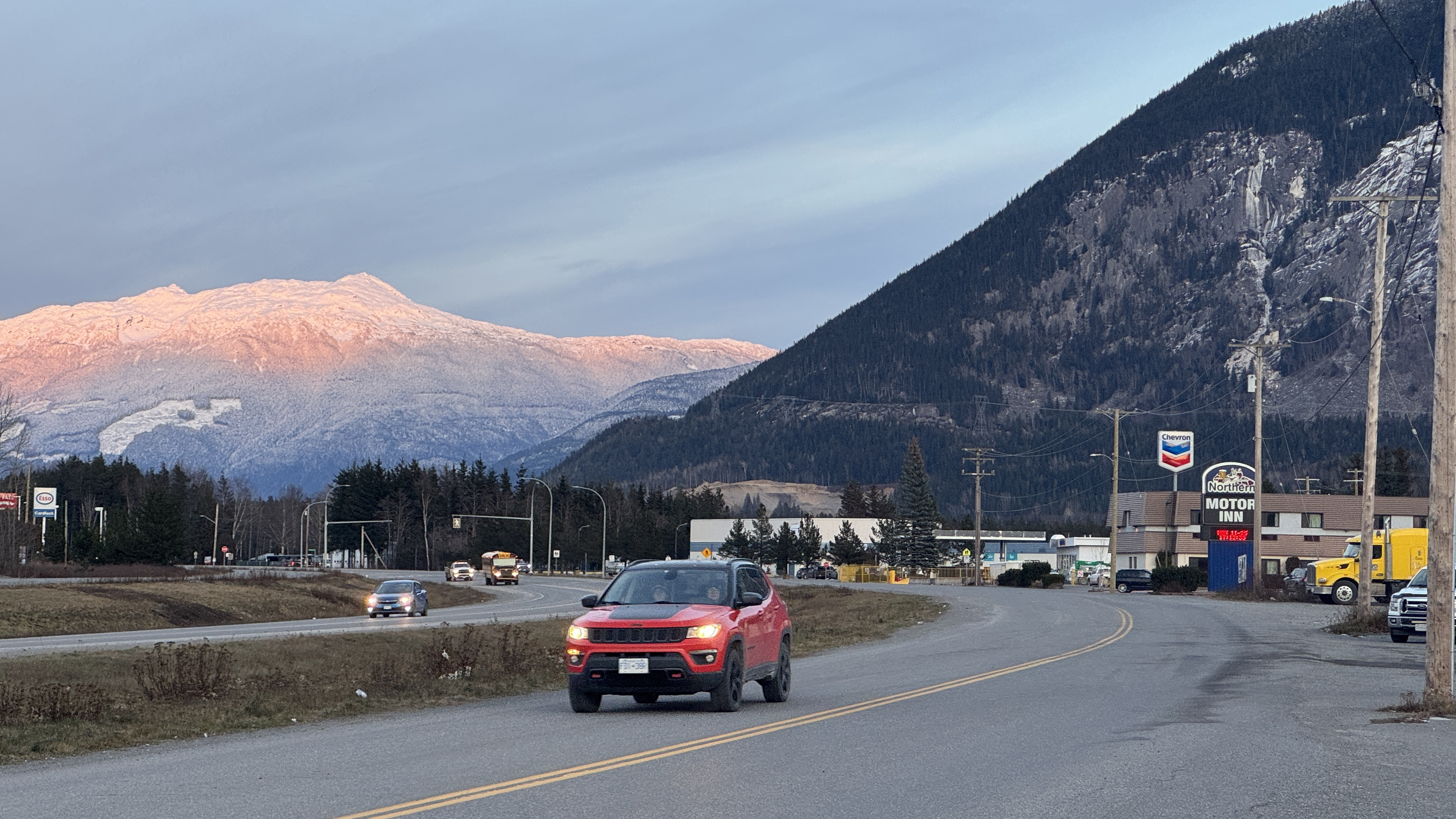
- Thornhill, 2024.

- Location of Thornhill
- Coordinates: 54°30′44″N 128°32′18″W
- Country: Canada
- Province: British Columbia
- Regional District: Kitimat-Stikine
- Electoral Area: E
- Created: 1967
- Named for: Tom Thornhill

Government
  - Type: Regional District
  - Area Director: Ted Ramsey
  - MP: Ellis Ross (Conservative)
  - MLA: Claire Rattée (BC Conservatives)

Area
  - Total: 16.49 km^{2} (6.37 sq mi)
- Elevation: 75 m (246 ft)

Population (2021)
  - Total: 3,932
  - Density: 238.5/km^{2} (618/sq mi)
- Time zone: UTC−07:00 (PT)
- Postal prefix: V8G
- Area codes: 250, 778, 236, & 672
- Highways: Highway 16; Highway 37

Thornhill is an unincorporated community in northwestern British Columbia, with a population of 3,932 residents as of the 2021 Canadian census. It is governed by the Regional District of Kitimat-Stikine, and is classified as Electoral Area E. Thornhill is located immediately to the east of Terrace across the Skeena River. Thornhill is connected to Terrace by the Old Skeena Bridge and the Dudley Little Bridge.

== History ==
Thornhill, British Columbia, is named after Tom Thornhill, an English settler, and his wife Eliza, a member of the Kitselas First Nation. The Thornhills settled on the banks of the Skeena River in the late 19th century. Tom was a captain of a paddle-wheeler that operated along the Skeena River, while Eliza contributed to the community through trapping and hunting. Their cabin, built near the river, became the first permanent European settlements in the area. Eliza Thornhill died in 1907, and Tom Thornhill died in 1910.

The community grew with the arrival of settlers and the construction of infrastructure, such as roads and bridges, in the early 20th century. The development of the Grand Trunk Pacific Railway and the Canadian National Railway played a key role in the expansion of the region. As Thornhill developed, logging and sawmilling became important industries in the area.

During the 1970s, Thornhill saw growth due to as many people sought affordable housing in the community. The expansion of logging and other resource industries in the region also contributed to Thornhill’s population growth.

In the 1990s, the possibility of Thornhill’s incorporation was explored. In 1995, a study was commissioned by the provincial government to consider both the incorporation of Thornhill and the potential merging of Thornhill with Terrace. The study projected significant tax increases if Thornhill became independent, and in 1997, a referendum on the merger of Thornhill and Terrace was held. Thornhill residents voted against the proposal, while Terrace residents supported it.

Since then, discussions about the community’s governance have continued, with some residents advocating for Thornhill to become an incorporated municipality. In 2014, the issue of governance resurfaced with renewed calls for incorporation due to Thornhill’s relatively large population and unique governance, and the challenges of managing services within the regional district. Thornhill is considered one of the largest unincorporated communities by population in the province.

The community remains part of Electoral Area E in the Kitimat-Stikine Regional District, and as of 2024, efforts continue to explore the feasibility of Thornhill’s incorporation or other governance options.

== Geography ==
Thornhill is located within the Coastal Western Hemlock Wet Submaritime Biogeoclimatic Zone, characterized by dense forests consisting of Western Red Cedar, Western Hemlock, Balsam, and Sitka Spruce. The community is situated on the southwest side of the Skeena River, with several tributaries including Thornhill Creek, Hurley Creek, and Kofoed Creek, which are fish-bearing streams. The Skeena River is a central natural feature in the area, supporting salmon and steelhead populations.

Notable topographical features in Thornhill include Copper Mountain to its west and Thornhill Mountain. The land in Thornhill is primarily forested, with areas of steep slopes leading to the river. In 1979, it was estimated that approximately 45% of Thornhill’s land area is classified as either “not developable” or “restricted developable” due to natural and man-made constraints, including steep escarpments, drainage courses, and transportation networks.

The 200-year floodplain of the Skeena River extends to areas on the west side of Queensway Drive and west of Kofoed Drive. Development in these areas is subject to flood risk considerations, and mitigation measures may be required, such as elevating habitable spaces above floodplain levels.

There are also areas with steep slopes in Thornhill, particularly around Copper Mountain, and the escarpments that separate the Bench area from Queensway Drive and the Upper Bench from the Horseshoe. Development in these areas is generally restricted due to the risk of landslides.

Thornhill contains pockets of glaciomarine soils, which are fine-grained soils susceptible to landslides if disturbed.

=== Climate ===
Thornhill experiences a temperate climate with mild temperatures and significant precipitation. The area receives approximately 1,338 mm (52.68 in) of precipitation annually, supporting lush vegetation typical of the Coastal Western Hemlock Wet Submaritime Biogeoclimatic Zone. This climate contributes to the dense forests in the region and influences local hydrological patterns.

Climate normals are from Northwest Regional Airport Terrace-Kitimat, about 5.75 km (3.57 mi) southwest.

Climate data for Terrace (Terrace Airport) WMO ID: 71951; coordinates 54°27′59″N 128°34′39″W; elevation: 217.3 m (713 ft); 1991–2020 normals, extremes 1953–present
Month	Jan	Feb	Mar	Apr	May	Jun	Jul	Aug	Sep	Oct	Nov	Dec	Year
Record high humidex	8.4	12.6	20.5	28.0	34.6	38.0	39.3	38.5	34.1	23.3	14.5	12.5	39.3
Record high °C (°F)	9.4 (48.9)	12.7 (54.9)	20.8 (69.4)	26.0 (78.8)	34.6 (94.3)	36.5 (97.7)	37.3 (99.1)	36.2 (97.2)	32.2 (90.0)	21.4 (70.5)	13.4 (56.1)	11.3 (52.3)	37.3 (99.1)
Mean daily maximum °C (°F)	−1.4 (29.5)	1.6 (34.9)	5.6 (42.1)	11.0 (51.8)	16.4 (61.5)	19.1 (66.4)	21.5 (70.7)	21.4 (70.5)	16.1 (61.0)	9.1 (48.4)	3.0 (37.4)	−0.4 (31.3)	10.3 (50.5)
Daily mean °C (°F)	−3.3 (26.1)	−1.0 (30.2)	2.1 (35.8)	6.4 (43.5)	11.2 (52.2)	14.3 (57.7)	16.6 (61.9)	16.5 (61.7)	12.2 (54.0)	6.4 (43.5)	1.2 (34.2)	−2.1 (28.2)	6.7 (44.1)
Mean daily minimum °C (°F)	−5.3 (22.5)	−3.5 (25.7)	−1.3 (29.7)	1.8 (35.2)	5.8 (42.4)	9.3 (48.7)	11.7 (53.1)	11.6 (52.9)	8.3 (46.9)	3.6 (38.5)	−0.7 (30.7)	−3.9 (25.0)	3.1 (37.6)
Record low °C (°F)	−25.0 (−13.0)	−25.0 (−13.0)	−19.4 (−2.9)	−8.3 (17.1)	−2.7 (27.1)	0.6 (33.1)	3.3 (37.9)	2.8 (37.0)	−1.8 (28.8)	−13.5 (7.7)	−25.3 (−13.5)	−26.7 (−16.1)	−26.7 (−16.1)
Record low wind chill	−41.0	−35.9	−30.3	−14.5	−6.1	0	0	0	−4.4	−24	−41.7	−42.2	−42.2
Average precipitation mm (inches)	178.0 (7.01)	103.1 (4.06)	90.3 (3.56)	65.5 (2.58)	54.6 (2.15)	51.8 (2.04)	58.8 (2.31)	66.6 (2.62)	119.1 (4.69)	182.7 (7.19)	190.2 (7.49)	177.5 (6.99)	1,338 (52.68)
Average rainfall mm (inches)	95.6 (3.76)	58.2 (2.29)	56.4 (2.22)	60.1 (2.37)	53.7 (2.11)	51.8 (2.04)	58.8 (2.31)	66.6 (2.62)	119.1 (4.69)	178.1 (7.01)	133.6 (5.26)	91.2 (3.59)	1,023.2 (40.28)
Average snowfall cm (inches)	91.5 (36.0)	47.4 (18.7)	34.6 (13.6)	5.0 (2.0)	0.6 (0.2)	0.0 (0.0)	0.0 (0.0)	0.0 (0.0)	0.0 (0.0)	4.6 (1.8)	54.6 (21.5)	89.5 (35.2)	327.6 (129.0)
Average precipitation days (≥ 0.2 mm)	20.7	14.3	17.3	15.7	14.7	15.5	14.9	14.1	17.7	21.5	21.7	21.5	209.6
Average rainy days (≥ 0.2 mm)	11.8	9.6	13.0	14.9	14.7	15.5	14.9	14.1	17.7	21.2	17.3	11.2	175.8
Average snowy days (≥ 0.2 cm)	14.6	9.0	9.5	2.8	0.28	0.0	0.0	0.0	0.0	1.3	9.7	16.5	63.7
Average relative humidity (%) (at 1500 LST)	80.4	73.2	63.7	54.1	49.5	53.0	55.3	56.8	67.3	78.2	85.1	85.1	66.8
Source: Environment and Climate Change Canada

Climate change may impact the community by contributing to increased flooding in local creeks and rivers, potentially affecting the landscape and infrastructure. Rising temperatures could also lead to higher river and stream temperatures, which may impact local aquatic ecosystems.

== Demographics ==
Population history of Kitimat-Stikine Area E (Thornhill)
Year	Pop.	±%
1996	4,722	—
2001	4,475	−5.2%
2006	4,002	−10.6%
2011	3,988	−0.3%
2016	3,993	+0.1%
2021	3,932	−1.5%
Source: 2001, 2006, 2011, 2016, 2021 Canadian Census

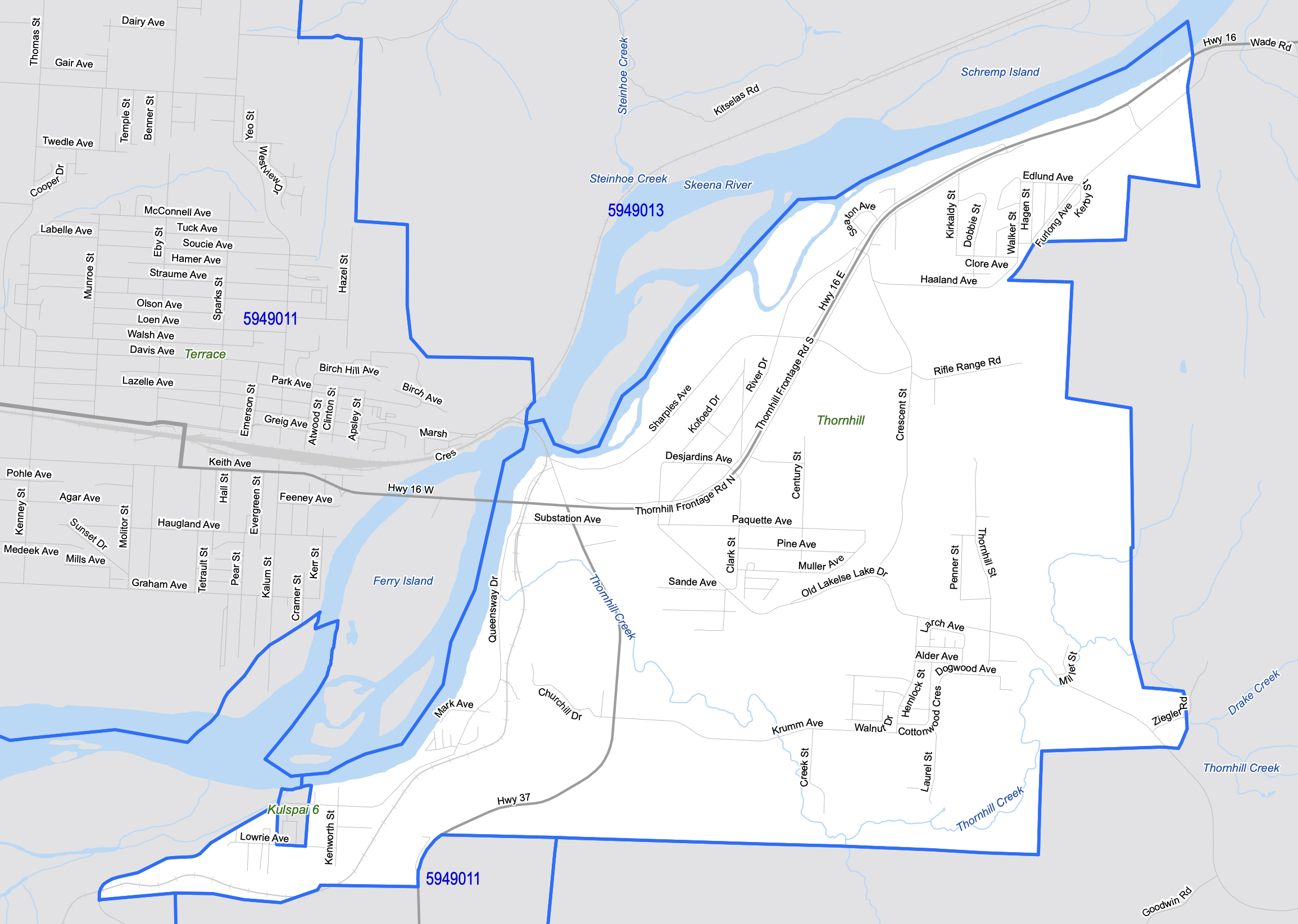
2021 Census Subdivision Boundaries for Kitimat-Stikine Area E (Thornhill).

The population of Thornhill, British Columbia, has remained relatively stable since 2006, though the precise number can vary depending on the interpretation of the community’s boundaries. Thornhill is considered to include areas adjacent to the city of Terrace, but its exact geographic scope is sometimes subject to debate. Subdivisions such as Copperside Estates and Jackpine Flats are often included when discussing the population of Thornhill. However, there is some ambiguity regarding their inclusion, as the boundaries of Thornhill are not always clearly defined. Copperside Estates is frequently viewed as part of Thornhill due to its proximity and shared services, but is not considered part of Electoral Area E while the status of Jackpine Flats in relation to Thornhill is less clear. Some sources may include these subdivisions in the population count, while others may consider them distinct areas within the broader region, or part of Regional District of Kitimat-Stikine Electoral Area C.

Thornhill is part of Electoral Area E of the Regional District of Kitimat-Stikine, which extends from the area around Kulspi 6 (Gitaus) on Queensway Drive, to the southwest, and includes areas along Highway 16 to Creech Street to the east, and continues to Ziegler Road and Old Lakelse Lake Drive, to the south. The community’s boundaries are generally considered to be along these defined roads and areas, and population counts through the Canadian Census officially reflect this geographic area.

=== Ethnicity ===
Panethnic groups in Thornhill (Kitimat-Stikine Area E) (2001−2021)
Panethnic group	2021		2016		2011		2006		2001	
Panethnic group	Pop.	%	Pop.	%	Pop.	%	Pop.	%	Pop.	%
European (Note: Statistic includes all persons that did not make up part of a visible minority or an indigenous identity.)	2,620	67.18%	3,050	76.73%	3,345	84.26%	3,260	81.6%	3,685	82.53%
Indigenous	1,155	29.62%	865	21.76%	590	14.86%	660	16.52%	695	15.57%
East Asian (Note: Statistic includes total responses of "Chinese", "Korean", and "Japanese" under visible minority section on census.)	45	1.15%	30	0.75%	0	0%	25	0.63%	20	0.45%
Southeast Asian (Note: Statistic includes total responses of "Filipino" and "Southeast Asian" under visible minority section on census.)	35	0.9%	20	0.5%	0	0%	0	0%	0	0%
South Asian	25	0.64%	20	0.5%	0	0%	35	0.88%	30	0.67%
Latin American	10	0.26%	0	0%	20	0.5%	10	0.25%	40	0.9%
Middle Eastern (Note: Statistic includes total responses of "West Asian" and "Arab" under visible minority section on census.)	0	0%	0	0%	0	0%	0	0%	0	0%
African	0	0%	0	0%	0	0%	15	0.38%	10	0.22%
Other/multiracial (Note: Statistic includes total responses of "Visible minority, n.i.e." and "Multiple visible minorities" under visible minority section on census.)	0	0%	0	0%	20	0.5%	0	0%	0	0%
Total responses	3,900	99.19%	3,975	99.55%	3,970	99.55%	3,995	99.83%	4,465	99.78%
Total population	3,932	100%	3,993	100%	3,988	100%	4,002	100%	4,475	100%
Note: Totals greater than 100% due to multiple origin responses.

Major ethnic groups in Thornhill (Kitimat-Stikine Area E) (2021 Canadian census)
Ethnic group	Population	Percentage
English	1,025 (Note: "English": 905 persons "British Isles, n.o.s.": 120 persons)	26.25%
First Nations	835	21.38%
Scottish	825	21.13%
German	760	19.46%
Irish	645	16.52%
French	520 (Note: "French, n.o.s.": 465 persons "French Canadian": 55 persons)	13.32%
Métis	300	7.68%
Ukrainian	260	6.66%
Dutch	245	6.27%
Norwegian	230	5.89%
Polish	115	2.94%
Swedish	105	2.69%
Italian	80	2.05%
Russian	75	1.92%
Welsh	75	1.92%
Total responses	3,905	99.31%
Total population	3,932	100%
Note: Totals greater than 100% due to multiple origin responses

== Economy ==
The economy of Thornhill, British Columbia, is influenced by various industries and employment sectors. The 2021 Census provided insights into the community’s workforce and income levels. Key data includes:

Most common industries of employment for people aged 15 and over in 2020:

- Trade and Transport: 33.0%
- Sales and Services: 22.5%
- Education, Law, and Government: 13.6%
- Business Services: 12.5%

Unemployment and employment rates in Thornhill are similar to those of the Regional District of Kitimat-Stikine, but higher than the province of British Columbia.

Average total individual income in Thornhill in 2020 was $52,300, while the median total individual income was $44,000.

In 2020, 9.7% of households in Thornhill were classified as low-income, both lower than the 11.9% rate in the Regional District of Kitimat-Stikine (RDKS), and the 10.8% rate for the province of British Columbia.

=== Economy and Employment ===
The economy of Thornhill and its residents’ employment are linked to broader economic activity in the region, particularly in the neighbouring city of Terrace, which serves as the major service centre for northwestern British Columbia. Terrace is an important hub for resource industries, including forestry, mining exploration, and LNG development.

Economic development in Thornhill is influenced by global market cycles, particularly those tied to resource industries. The community’s economic strategy involves maximizing benefits from industrial activity while also ensuring that the economy remains diverse and resilient when such activity diminishes.

Thornhill has a mix of commercial businesses that include accommodations, retail stores, gas stations, convenience stores, restaurants, and vehicle sales. Additionally, industrial businesses such as gravel extraction and processing, mini storage, and auto repair operate in the area. Despite these existing services, Thornhill residents have noted that there are unmet commercial needs, including greater access to clothing stores, coffee shops, grocery stores, and entertainment options.

=== Tourism ===
Thornhill benefits from its natural environment and recreational opportunities, attracting tourists to the area. Key tourism-related amenities include:

- Thornhill Mountain and Copper Mountain, which offer hiking and biking trails.
- Skeena Valley Golf & Country Club, a golf course providing recreational opportunities for residents and visitors.
- Terrace Rod & Gun Club, which offers fishing, hunting, and shooting sports.
- Hidden Acres Farm & Treehouse Resort, providing accommodation and recreational activities.

== Arts and Culture ==
Thornhill, British Columbia, has a variety of cultural events and tourism opportunities that reflect its local heritage and natural environment.

=== Annual Cultural Events ===
Thornhill hosts several annual cultural events, providing opportunities for residents and visitors to engage with the local community and traditions:

- Farm Fest at Hidden Acres Farm & Treehouse Resort: This event is held annually at Hidden Acres Farm & Treehouse Resort. It features activities such as live music, farm tours, and various family-friendly events, showcasing local agriculture and farm life.
- Skeena Valley Fall Fair: Historically hosted at the Thornhill Community Grounds, the Skeena Valley Fall Fair celebrated the agricultural heritage of the region with exhibits on local produce, crafts, and live entertainment. The fair was an annual event that brought together local residents for a community celebration of the harvest season.
- Skeena Valley Country Music Festival: Hosted by the BC Métis Foundation at the Thornhill Community Centre, this annual music festival celebrates country music with performances from local and regional musicians. The festival is a key event in the community’s cultural calendar.

=== Tourism ===
Thornhill is located in an area rich in natural beauty, with opportunities for outdoor recreation that draw visitors to the region. Notable tourism features include:

- Thornhill Mountain: Thornhill Mountain is a popular location for hiking and biking. The trails on the mountain offer access to the surrounding natural environment, providing recreational opportunities for both locals and visitors.
- Skeena River: The Skeena River is a well-known destination for fishing, particularly for salmon and steelhead. The river is also used for other recreational activities such as canoeing and wildlife viewing. Fishing in the river attracts many visitors each year.

== Sports ==
Thornhill, British Columbia, offers a variety of recreational facilities and programs for residents, including the Thornhill Community Centre, local parks, and access to facilities in the neighbouring city of Terrace.

=== Parks and Recreation ===
- Thornhill Community Centre: This facility serves as a hub for social gatherings, community events, and activities. It hosts a wide range of programs, including fitness classes, social events, and community meetings.
- Thornhill Landing Park: Located along Queensway Drive, this park provides access to the Skeena River and features benches for visitors to enjoy the view.
- Thornhill Tennis Courts: These courts are available for tennis and roller-hockey, offering recreational opportunities for residents.
- Jackpine Wetlands Trail: Although it's not technically in Thornhill, this trail offers outdoor recreation opportunities, including walking and bird-watching, in a natural setting.

=== Recreational Services Funding ===
Residents of Thornhill contribute to the funding of recreational services through:

- Operation of the Thornhill Community Centre Grounds: Funding supports the maintenance and operation of the community centre, which hosts various programs and events.
- Maintenance of Thornhill Parks and Recreational Sites: Contributions help maintain local parks and recreational areas, ensuring they remain accessible and well-kept for public use.
- Support for Recreation Services in Terrace: A portion of the funding assists in the operation of the Terrace Sportsplex and pool in the city of Terrace, providing residents with access to additional recreational facilities.

==== Terrace Sportsplex ====
The Terrace Sportsplex is a multi-purpose facility offering:

- Ice Skating: The facility includes two sheets of ice, accommodating various ice sports and public skating sessions.
- Fitness Classes: The Sportsplex offers a range of fitness classes, including skating and fitness programs.
- Room Rentals: The facility provides room rentals for events and meetings, including a banquet room and multi-purpose spaces.

Residents contribute to the funding of these services, which are managed by the city of Terrace.

== Government ==
Thornhill is an unincorporated community, meaning it is not governed as an independent municipality. It is part of the Kitimat-Stikine Regional District (RDKS), which is responsible for various services in the area. The community is located within Electoral Area E of the RDKS, and governance is provided through the regional district’s board.

=== Governance ===
The RDKS is governed by a board consisting of a chair and 11 directors, one of whom is elected to represent each electoral area. Elections are held every four years during the general local elections. In addition to the elected directors, every municipality within the Regional District appoints council members to sit on the regional board. This structure allows Thornhill to have representation through its elected director, but it does not have the same local autonomy as an incorporated municipality.

The Thornhill Advisory Planning Commission (APC) has been established by the Regional District Board to provide advice on planning matters specific to the Thornhill area. The APC consists of nine members: eight are appointed from the community, and one is a representative of the Kitselas First Nation. Members of the APC are appointed for two-year unpaid terms.

=== Incorporation ===
Thornhill residents have expressed interest in exploring alternative governance arrangements, including the possibility of incorporation as a municipality or amalgamation with the city of Terrace. In 1997, a referendum was held to consider the option of amalgamating Thornhill with Terrace. However, the proposal did not receive enough support from Thornhill residents to proceed.

A community survey conducted as part of the Official Community Plan (OCP) process indicated a range of opinions on the future governance structure. The survey asked residents about their vision for the community and the potential challenges they face. Approximately 25 out of 344 respondents specifically mentioned regional governance, with half supporting incorporation of Thornhill as a municipality and the other half in favour of amalgamation with Terrace.

In 2018, the Regional District conducted the Thornhill Community Outreach Study to assess public interest in a governance study. The study involved informational materials, public meetings, and surveys. However, less than 5% of Thornhill residents participated, and the feedback did not show a strong desire to alter the governance structure or initiate a formal study on governance options.

== Education ==
Thornhill is served by several educational institutions, providing a range of academic and vocational training opportunities for students in the area. The community is part of Coast Mountains School District 82 (CMSD 82), which manages all public education services in Thornhill.

=== Primary and Secondary Education ===
- Thornhill Primary School: This school serves students from Kindergarten through Grade 3. It is one of the primary educational institutions in the community, offering early childhood education to younger students.
- Thornhill Elementary School: Serving students from Grades 4 to 6, Thornhill Elementary School provides education for older primary and early secondary-aged children.
- Thornhill Junior Secondary School: Originally serving students up to Grade 10, this school has been repurposed into the Thornhill Trades Building, a facility dedicated to vocational and trades education. The school had previously been a key institution for secondary education in the community, but now focuses on providing trades-related training through the Northwest Trades & Employment Training Centre.

=== Vocational and Post-Secondary Education ===
- Northwest Trades & Employment Training Centre: Located in Thornhill, this training centre offers educational opportunities in various trades and employment skills. The facility is designed to provide hands-on learning and vocational training for those pursuing careers in trades such as construction, electrical work, and other skilled professions. The centre helps address local employment needs by offering specialized training for students and adult learners looking to gain qualifications in practical fields.

== Media ==
The media in Thornhill is primarily focused on the city of Terrace and the surrounding areas but also covers broader regions of northwestern British Columbia. The media landscape includes a variety of newspapers, radio stations, and television outlets that serve the region.

=== Newspapers ===
The history of newspapers in the area dates back to the early 20th century, with several publications serving the communities of Terrace and its surrounding regions:

- Terrace News Letter: Plans for the Terrace News Letter were announced in 1914, though its launch is unclear.
- Terrace Dispatch: Published from 1915 to 1917, this newspaper was one of the early sources of news in the Terrace area.
- Terrace News: Established in early 1920, the Terrace News was in publication at least until 1922. A 1934 mention of the paper remains uncertain.
- Omineca Herald & Terrace Times: By the early 1940s, the Omineca Herald in Hazelton had merged with the Terrace Times and was renamed the Omineca Herald & Terrace Times. In 1949, the name changed again to Terrace Omineca Herald, and the paper moved from New Hazelton to Terrace. By the 1960s, it became known simply as the Terrace Herald. The Terrace Herald ceased publication in 1984.
- Terrace Review: The Terrace Review was published from 1985 to 1992, covering local news during its years of publication.
- Terrace Daily Online: The Terrace Daily Online was a digital news source that existed from around 2007 to 2012, providing online news coverage for the area.
- Terrace Standard: First printed in 1988, the Terrace Standard is the main daily publication serving the Terrace area and continues to provide local and regional news.
- Skeena Reporter: Launched in 2023, the Skeena Reporter covers local news in Terrace and its surrounding areas.

These publications, particularly The Terrace Standard and The Skeena Reporter, are central to providing local news to both Terrace and surrounding communities, with some publications also offering broader coverage of the northwestern British Columbia region.

=== Radio ===
Radio stations in the area offer a variety of programming and are primarily based in Terrace, though they serve the surrounding region:

- AM 590 – CFTK: This station broadcasts adult contemporary music and is a key local radio station serving the Terrace area.
- FM 92.1 – CFNR-FM: This station provides First Nations community programming and classic rock music. It serves the northern regions of British Columbia and provides programming relevant to the local Indigenous communities.
- FM 95.3 – CBTH-FM: A CBC Radio One station, CBTH-FM repeats CFPR from Prince Rupert and covers regional news and programming.
- FM 96.9 – CBUF-FM-3: This station is a repeater of Première Chaîne (CBUF-FM) from Vancouver, providing French-language programming for the region.
- FM 103.1 – CJFW-FM: CJFW-FM broadcasts country music and is another popular station in the area, serving a broad audience in Terrace and surrounding areas.

=== Television ===
- Channel 3 – CFTK-TV: CFTK-TV is the local television station, operating as a CTV 2 owned-and-operated station. It provides news, entertainment, and other programming for Terrace and surrounding communities.

== Infrastructure ==
Thornhill has a range of infrastructure services that are either provided by the Regional District of Kitimat-Stikine, or in partnership with neighbouring Terrace. The community’s infrastructure includes transportation networks, utilities, emergency services, and public facilities that serve both Thornhill residents and the surrounding areas.

=== Transportation ===
Thornhill is heavily automobile dependent, with 93% of trips made by car, truck, or van, as reported in the 2021 Census. Public transit accounts for under 2% of trips, and walking or cycling represents roughly 3.5% of transportation modes. Thornhill is located along key transportation corridors, which provide access to neighbouring communities and services.

- Road Network: Thornhill is connected by several major arterials, with a system of collectors and local roads. Key highways running through Thornhill include Highway 16, which connects Prince Rupert and Prince George, and Highway 37 South, which links Terrace to Kitimat by passing through the highway 37 16 Junction in Thornhill and extends southeast wards to Kitwanga.
- BC Transit: Thornhill is served by BC Transit’s Regional Transit System, which is jointly funded by the provincial and local governments. Thornhill residents contribute to the local government costs, and some infrastructure, such as bus shelters, is funded solely by the Regional District of Kitimat-Stikine. A private contractor operates the service in the region.
- Trails: There are several trails throughout Thornhill, many of which are located on Crown lands. The Thornhill Active Transportation Plan aims to enhance opportunities for physical activity, focusing on the development of an interconnected network of trails that will improve connectivity between neighbourhoods.
- Air Travel: The Northwest Regional Airport, shared by Terrace and Kitimat, serves the region with airlines such as WestJet, Central Mountain Air, and Air Canada.
- Rail: Thornhill is also intersected by the Canadian National (CN) Railway network, which stretches over 900 kilometres in the region. The rail lines are primarily used for freight transportation, but limited passenger services are available between Prince Rupert and Jasper, connecting to VIA Rail’s The Canadian route.

=== Utilities ===
Thornhill relies on various utility services, which are provided by the Regional District of Kitimat-Stikine and paid for by Thornhill tax dollars and shared with neighbouring areas:

- Cellular and Internet: Thornhill is served by a variety of telecommunications providers, including CityWest and TELUS, offering cellular service and internet access. Service availability varies depending on location, with some remote areas of Thornhill having limited connectivity.
- Water: Thornhill’s water system is supplied by two high-capacity wells near the Copper Mountain subdivision. A third well has been developed in the area as a future water source. The Regional District of Kitimat-Stikine also maintains a standby well in the Woodlands area, although this is not the preferred source for water.
- Sewage: Most properties in Thornhill use individual septic systems. However, areas like Queensway Drive and Churchill Drive are connected to a community sewer system that uses septic tank effluent pumping to transport waste to lagoons and rapid infiltration basins. The system was designed to accommodate an extension to the core of Thornhill, with a portion of the commercial core connected to the system in 2016. The expansion of the sewer system is a priority for residents due to concerns over failing septic systems.
- Policing: Thornhill shares policing services with Terrace through the Terrace RCMP detachment. The costs of patrols and services are shared between the municipalities under an agreement with the Regional District of Kitimat-Stikine.
- Fire Services: The Thornhill Volunteer Fire Department provides fire protection services to Thornhill and surrounding areas. This service is extended to other unincorporated communities in the region through the Regional District of Kitimat-Stikine.
- Health Care: Thornhill is served by several health care services:
  - Ksyen Regional Hospital (formerly Mills Memorial Hospital): Located in Terrace, this hospital provides acute care, emergency services, and other health-related services to the region.
  - BC Ambulance Service: Provides emergency medical services to Thornhill and surrounding communities, with response times supported by the Terrace and Thornhill areas.
  - North West Regional Hospital District: Oversees health care funding and infrastructure in the region, including contributions to hospital and ambulance services.

=== Solid Waste ===
The Regional District of Kitimat-Stikine manages solid waste collection and curbside recycling in Thornhill. Waste is taken to the Forceman Ridge Landfill, with a new transfer station developed in Thornhill to handle waste disposal. A curbside organics collection program has also been implemented, with composting facilities available for organic waste.
