= Northwest Regional Airport Terrace-Kitimat =

Regional airport

Northwest Regional Airport Terrace-Kitimat French Aéroport régional du Northwest Terrace-Kitimat
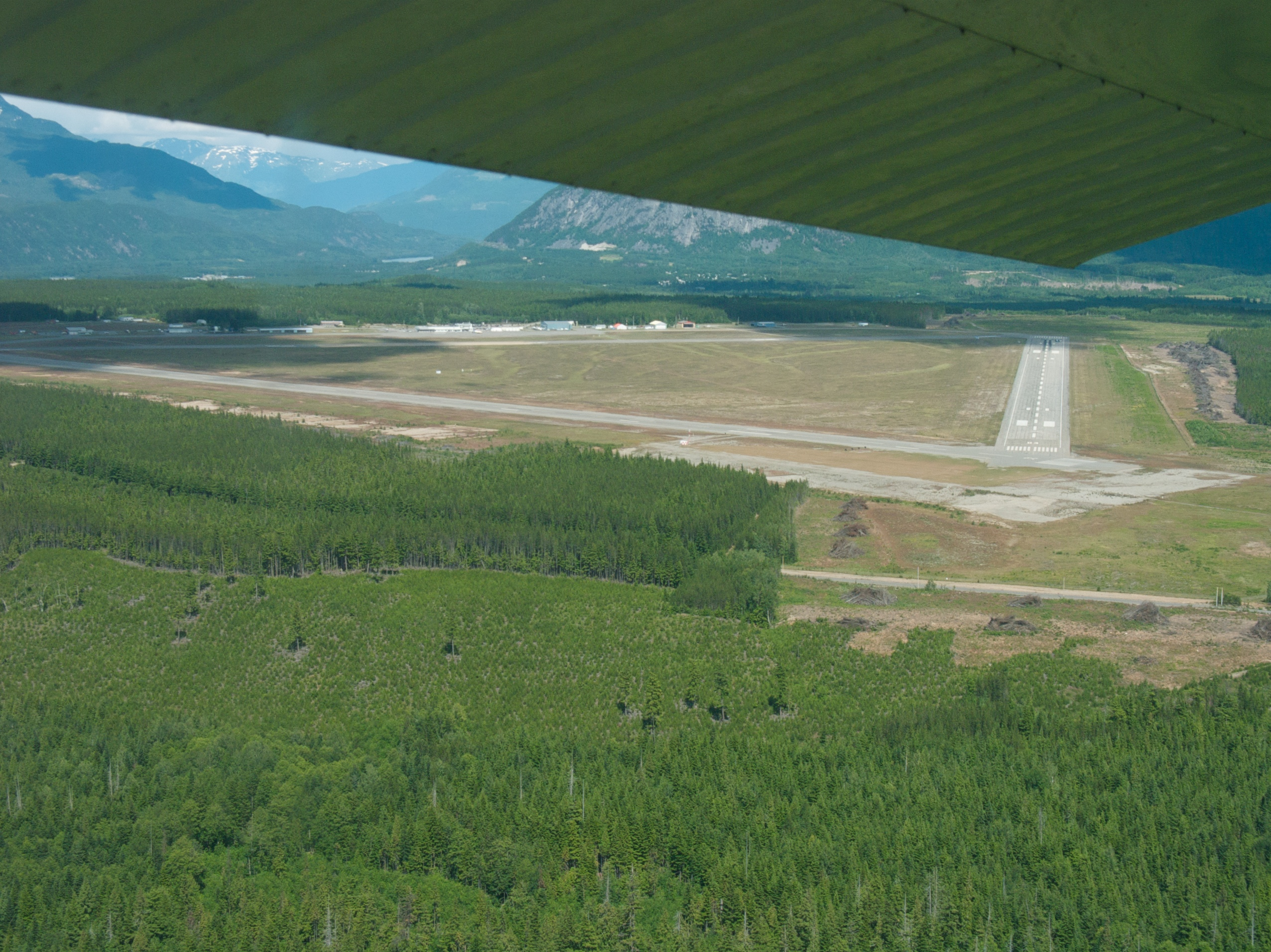
- IATA: YXT; ICAO: CYXT; WMO: 71951

Summary
- Airport type: Public
- Owner/Operator: Terrace-Kitimat Airport Society
- Location: Terrace, British Columbia
- Opened: 1943
- Time zone: MST (UTC−07:00)
- Elevation AMSL: 713 ft (217 m)
- Coordinates: 54°28′07″N 128°34′42″W
- Website: yxt.ca
- Interactive map of Northwest Regional Airport Terrace-Kitimat

Runways
Direction	Length		Surface
Direction	ft	m	Surface
03/21	5,316	1,620	Asphalt
15/33	7,497	2,285	Asphalt

Statistics (2024)
- Passengers: 414,997
- Passenger flights: 6,656
- Source: Canada Flight Supplement and Statistics Canada

Northwest Regional Airport Terrace-Kitimat, (IATA: YXT, ICAO: CYXT), is a regional airport serving northwestern British Columbia, Canada, including Terrace, Thornhill, Kitimat, and the Nass River Valley. Located is located 3 nautical miles (5.6 km; 3.5 mi) south of Terrace (about 10 km (6.2 mi) south of downtown), the airport connects the region to major Canadian cities through passenger, cargo, and charter services. YXT is managed by the Terrace-Kitimat Airport Society, a non-profit organization responsible for its operations and strategic development.

== History ==
=== World War II origins ===
YXT was originally constructed in 1943 as a Royal Canadian Air Force (RCAF) airbase during World War II. It formed part of Canada's Pacific defence strategy against potential Japanese threats. The facility hosted fighter and bomber squadrons, including the Hawker Hurricanes of No. 135 Squadron and Ventura bombers of No. 149 Squadron.

Construction challenges, such as harsh weather and limited resources, delayed the base’s operational readiness. By 1944, as the perceived threat diminished, the airbase shifted to a support role, and in 1945, RCAF decommissioned the base.

=== Post-war civilian use ===
Transferred to the Department of Transport in 1946, the airfield transitioned to civilian use. In 1947, it received its first civilian airport license, though it saw limited activity until the 1950s. The industrial development of Kitimat and the construction of the aluminum smelter brought increased demand for regional air transport, leading to infrastructure upgrades, including night-flight lighting systems in 1956.

=== Modernization and local management ===
In 1999, the airport was transferred to the Terrace-Kitimat Airport Society under Canada’s National Airports Policy.

== Facilities ==
=== Runways ===
Northwest Regional Airport features two asphalt runways:

- Runway 15/33: 7,497 ft × 148 ft (2,285 m × 45 m)
- Runway 03/21: 5,316 ft × 148 ft (1,620 m × 45 m)

The primary runway, 15/33, is equipped with an instrument landing system (ILS), installed in 2002, enabling aircraft to land in low-visibility conditions.

It was later replaced in 2015 with the support of federal government money after a series of failures resulted in the delay and cancellation of flights to and from the airport.

=== Terminal ===
The terminal, renovated and completed in 2018 and in 2024, includes expanded departure and arrivals areas, updated baggage handling systems, and updated parking facilities.

=== Ground transportation ===
The airport is accessible via the Stewart–Cassiar Highway (Highway 37) and offers on-site parking, car rentals, and taxi services. Parking facilities include short-term, long-term, and designated spaces for accessibility.

== Airlines and destinations ==
As of December 2024, passenger airlines Air Canada Express, and WestJet Encore operate at Northwest Regional Airport Terrace-Kitimat.

Airlines	Destinations
Air Canada Express	Vancouver
Airco	Charter: Prince George
Canadian North	Charter: Calgary, Edmonton, Hamilton
Central Mountain Air	Prince George; Charter: Kelowna, Vancouver
North Cariboo Air	Charter: Kelowna, Vancouver
Summit Air	Charter: Nanaimo
WestJet Encore	Calgary, Vancouver; Seasonal: Edmonton

== Passenger and cargo statistics ==
=== Passenger and air traffic ===
YXT has seen significant growth in passenger traffic, particularly when compared to other airports across the country post-COVID-19 pandemic. Based on Statistics Canada's 2024 Airport Activity Survey, Terrace is Canada's 19th busiest airport by total passengers.

Air passenger traffic at Northwest Regional Airport Terrace-Kitimat, annual (2020-24)
Year	Passenger flights	% change	Total passengers	% change
2020	3,865	Steady	168,168	Steady
2021	4,694	▲21.4%	218,397	▲29.8%
2022	7,441	▲58.5%	396,216	▲81.4%
2023	7,631	▲2.4%	444,425	▲12.1%
2024	6,656	▼12.7%	414,997	▼6.6%

== Improvements and investments ==
=== Infrastructure enhancements ===
- 2018: An $18.5 million terminal expansion improved passenger flow, added new facilities, and modernized baggage handling systems.
- 2024: Runway resurfacing and apron expansion projects were completed to accommodate larger aircraft.

=== Equipment investments ===
- Snowblowers and sweepers: New equipment was introduced to enhance runway safety during winter months, funded in part by LNG Canada and federal grants.

== Location ==
The airport is situated along the Stewart–Cassiar Highway, approximately 10 km (6.2 mi) south of downtown Terrace and 56 km (35 mi) north of Kitimat.

== Economic impact ==
Northwest Regional Airport plays a critical role in the economic development of northern British Columbia. It supports regional industries by facilitating the movement of goods and workers, especially for the mining and LNG sectors. The airport also serves as an emergency transport hub, connecting remote communities to essential medical services.

== Governance ==
The Terrace-Kitimat Airport Society, a non-profit organization, oversees the management and development of YXT. The organization includes representatives from the City of Terrace, the District of Kitimat, and the Regional District of Kitimat–Stikine. Revenue generated by the airport is reinvested into infrastructure and operational improvements.

== Accidents and incidents ==
Northwest Regional Airport Terrace-Kitimat has been the site of several aviation incidents and accidents. These events highlight the challenges of operating in a region with frequently adverse weather conditions, and mountainous terrain.

=== NT Air 405 / PWA 405 ===
On 14 January 1977, a de Havilland Canada DHC-6 Twin Otter operated by Northern Thunderbird Air, flying as Pacific Western Airlines Flight 405, crashed into a mountain during its approach to runway 32 in a snowstorm. The flight, operating from Prince George to Terrace, was carrying 12 individuals, all of whom died in the crash. Weather conditions, including limited visibility and heavy snowfall, were significant factors contributing to the accident.

The 1977 Twin Otter crash was the 43th worst aviation accident globally for that year.

=== Skylink Airlines Flight 070 ===
On 26 September 1989, Skylink Airlines Flight 070 (operated by Aztec Aviation), a Swearingen SA227-AC Metro III, was destroyed during a missed approach at Terrace. The aircraft, which was operating a scheduled domestic flight from Vancouver to Terrace, had five passengers and two crew members on board, all of whom were killed.

The aircraft was cleared for an approach to runway 27 but failed to establish the required visual references. The crew attempted a circling approach but initiated a missed approach in instrument flight rules (IFR) conditions. During the missed approach, the aircraft began an uncontrolled descent and struck trees near runway 15 before coming to rest outside the airport perimeter.

The Canadian Aviation Safety Board (CASB) identified several contributing factors, including:

- The crew’s decision to continue beyond the missed approach point without visual contact with the runway.
- Disorientation during the missed approach procedure.
- Inadequate operating standards and procedural definitions within the airline’s operations.

=== WestJet Encore flight 3107 ===
On 31 January 2020, WestJet Encore Flight 3107, a Bombardier DHC-8-400 operating from Vancouver to Terrace, experienced a nose landing gear collapse during landing on runway 33. At the time, snow was falling, and the runway was partially cleared, with windrows of snow approximately 18 in (460 mm) high along the edges of the cleared area.

The aircraft initially touched down approximately 10 ft (3.0 m) left of the centreline due to variable winds and reduced visual cues. It contacted the windrow, causing the nose gear to collapse and resulting in damage to the fuselage and right propeller blades. The aircraft came to a stop partially off the runway.

The Transportation Safety Board of Canada investigation identified several causes and contributing factors:

- Limited visual cues due to snow-covered conditions affected the crew’s ability to accurately judge lateral positioning.
- Contact with the windrow caused drag on the left landing gear, leading to a runway excursion.
- Snow and ice packed into the nose gear bay during the excursion contributed to the collapse of the gear.

The aircraft was ferried to Kelowna for repairs and returned to service in June 2020.

In response to the 2020 WestJet Encore Flight 3107 incident, the airline made changes to its safety handbook.
