= School District 82 Coast Mountains =

School district in British Columbia, Canada

Address
- 3211 Kenney Street Terrace, British Columbia, V8G 3E9; Canada

District information
- Superintendent: Ms. Janet Meyer
- Schools: 23
- Budget: CA$48.1 million

Students and staff
- Students: 5760

Other information
- Website: www.cmsd.bc.ca

School District 82 Coast Mountains is a school district in northwestern British Columbia between Prince Rupert and Prince George. This includes the major centres of Terrace, Kitimat and extends to the town of Stewart on the BC-Alaska border.

== History ==
In January 1968, School District 51 (Portland Canal) and School District 53 (Terrace) merged to form School District 88 (Skeena–Cassiar). In early 1975, School District 88 (Terrace) became the commonly used name. School District 82 was created in late 1996 by the amalgamation of School District 80 (Kitimat) and School District 88 (Terrace).

Until 2000, the school district had also provided schooling to American students from neighbouring Hyder, Alaska.

== Schools ==
School	Location	Grades
Bear Valley School	Stewart	K-12
Caledonia Senior Secondary School	Terrace	10-12
Cassie Hall Elementary School	Terrace	K-6
Suwilaawks Community School	Terrace	K-6
Hazelton Secondary School	Hazelton	8-12
John Field Elementary School	Hazelton	K-7
Kildala Elementary School	Kitimat	K-6
Kitimat City High School	Kitimat	8-12
Kitwanga Elementary School	Kitwanga	K-7
Mount Elizabeth Middle/Secondary School	Kitimat	7-12
Nechako Elementary School	Kitimat	K-6
New Hazelton Elementary School	New Hazelton	K-7
North Coast Distance Education School	Terrace	K-12, Adult
Parkside Secondary School	Terrace	8-12
SD 082 Connect Program	Terrace	K-12
Skeena Middle School	Terrace	7-9
South Hazelton Elementary School	South Hazelton	K-7
Thornhill Elementary School	Terrace	4-6
Thornhill Primary School	Terrace	K-3
Uplands Elementary School	Terrace	K-6

== See also ==
- List of school districts in British Columbia
