= Michelle Hendry =

Canadian basketball player

Michelle Hendry (born March 19, 1970, in Terrace, British Columbia) is a Canadian former basketball player who competed in the 2000 Summer Olympics.
