= Roxanne Chow =

Canadian soccer player

Personal information
- Full name: Roxanne Mary Chow
- Date of birth: October 31, 1979 (age 47)
- Place of birth: Terrace, British Columbia, Canada
- Position: Defender

Youth career
- Terrace Youth Soccer Association

College career
Years	Team	Apps	(Gls)
1997–1999	Simon Fraser Clan	42	(1)
2000–2001	Wake Forest Demon Deacons	15	(0)

International career
1998	Canada	1	(0)
Medal record
Women's football
Representing Canada
CONCACAF W Championship
Gold medal – first place	1998 Canada

Roxanne Mary Chow (born October 31, 1979) is a Canadian retired soccer player who played as a defender. She made one international appearance for the Canada national team.

== Early life and college career ==
Born in Terrace, Chow started playing soccer at the age of five for the Terrace Youth Soccer Association (TYSA). She was part of the British Columbia women's soccer team that won gold at the 1997 Canada Games in Brandon, Manitoba.

Chow started her collegiate career at Simon Fraser University, where she helped her team reach two consecutive NAIA finals in 1997 and 1998. As a freshman, she started all 23 games for the Clan, assisting two goals. She earned NAIA First Team All-American and NAIA All-Tournament Team honours. The following year, after missing the first few games due to national team commitments, she made a total of 19 appearances, scoring one goal and adding two assists. At the end of the season, she was again selected as a NAIA First-Team All-American.

In 1999, Chow travelled to Belgium to train with the 1998 Belgian Women's First Division champions Eendracht Aalst. In the fall of 2000, she transferred to Wake Forest University. As a junior, she played in nine games, starting six. Before the Santa Clara tournament, she tore her ACL during a practice session; as a result, she underwent surgery twice and was sidelined for the remainder of the season. She never fully recovered from this injury, and the following year she only made six appearances (one start) for the Demon Deacons.

== International career ==
On August 2, 1998, at the age of 18, Chow made her first and only appearance for the Canada national team in Orlando, Florida, as she played the final 19 minutes in a 4–0 loss to the United States at the Citrus Bowl. Although she did not make any appearances at the 1998 CONCACAF Women's Championship, which took place a few weeks after her debut, she still received a medal.

The following year, she represented Canada at the 1999 Pan American Games, where the Canadian Soccer Association fielded an under-20 squad. She played in every game of the tournament.

== Career statistics ==
=== International ===
Appearances and goals by national team and year
National team	Year	Apps	Goals
Canada	1998	1	0
Total		1	0

== Honours ==
=== National ===
British Columbia

- Canada Games: 1997

=== International ===
Canada

- CONCACAF Women's Championship: 1998 (Note: Although Chow did not make any appearances at the 1998 CONCACAF Women's Championship, she still received a medal.)

=== Individual ===
- NAIA First-Team All-American: 1997, 1998
- NAIA All-Tournament Team: 1997
