= Joe Ruelle =

Canadian blogger (born 1978)

Joe Ruelle is a Canadian author and blogger writing in Vietnamese.

== Biography ==
Born 1978 in Terrace, British Columbia, and raised in Vancouver, Ruelle moved to Hanoi in 2002, where he studied Vietnamese at the Vietnam National University, Hanoi. In 2006, he began writing a blog in Vietnamese, which attracted the attention of the mass media and marked the start of a career in the Vietnamese arts and entertainment industry. In addition to his real name, Ruelle uses the Vietnamese nick name of Dâu Tây what translating as Strawberry and a tongue-in-cheek play on words and the literal translation being 'Joe (Dâu) from the West', or Người Ca-na-điên what was the Canadien but điên is 'madman' in Vietnamese.

== Published collections ==
Ruelle's first collection of articles, The Name's Joe (Vietnamese: Tớ là Dâu), was published in July, 2007 and met with early commercial success, entering the Vietnamese bestseller list at number one. His second collection, Zigzagging Against Traffic (Vietnamese: Ngược Chiều Vun Vút), was published in January 2012 and met with similar success. Both collections include previously published as well as new material.

== Column ==
Ruelle has been a columnist for several Vietnamese online and print publications, including Beauty Magazine (Vietnamese: Đẹp) and Dân Trí (dantri.com.vn).

== Television and theatre ==
From 2007 to 2008, Ruelle co-hosted All Connect (Vietnamese: Kết Nối Trẻ), a youth debate show broadcast nationwide on the VTV6 Network. He has also played supporting roles in television dramas and comedies, including Those Emotional Men, 2007 (Vietnamese: Chàng Trai Đa Cảm) Test Negative, 2009 (Vietnamese; Âm tính), A Place to Spend the Holidays, 2012 (Vietnamese: Tìm nơi đón Tết), as well as having appeared on several talkshows. On stage, Ruelle has performed with the comedy troupe of Hanoi's Youth Theatre.
