= Tom Thornhill =

English settler in British Columbia

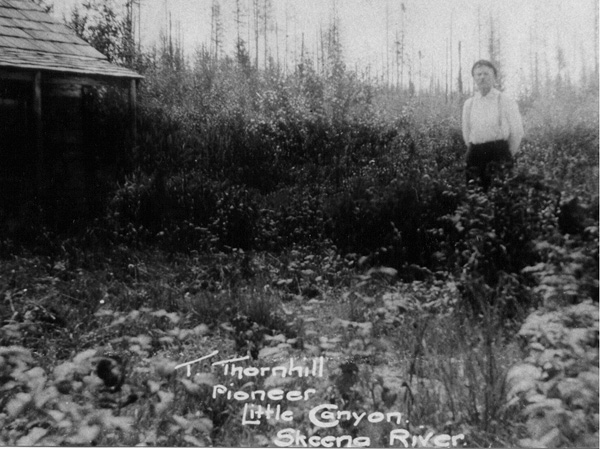
- Tom Thornhill is the namesake of Thornhill, British Columbia.
- Born: 1855; Kent, England
- Died: July 15, 1910 (aged 54–55); Prince Rupert, British Columbia
- Burial place: Old Prince Rupert Cemetery
- Monuments: Thornhill Landing, Thornhill, British Columbia
- Citizenship: England
- Spouse: Eliza Wright (m. 1982)

Tom Thornhill (1855 – July 15, 1910) was an English settler and one of the first non-Indigenous residents in the Skeena River Valley, British Columbia. The unincorporated community of Thornhill located east of Terrace is named after him. He is known for his significant role in early settlement and as a representative of the unique cultural interconnections between European settlers and Indigenous peoples in the late 19th century.

== Early life and background ==
Tom Thornhill was born in Kent, England, in 1855. He emigrated to Canada with his family at the age of three, settling in Victoria, British Columbia. Thornhill came from a family of some means, and his father was actively involved in church affairs. Tom is believed to have trained as a blacksmith, but a lung disorder, possibly caused by his trade, led him to seek a different way of life.

=== Marriage to Eliza Wright ===
While traveling in the Fraser Valley, Thornhill met Eliza Wright, a member of the Kitselas Tsimshian nation and sister to Kitselas Chief Walter Wright. Eliza was considered part of the “royal family” within her community. The couple married and moved to the Skeena River Valley in 1892, settling on land near the Kitselas Canyon. Their marriage represented a rare union at the time between an English settler and a prominent Indigenous woman.

=== Life on the Skeena ===
Upon settling near the Skeena River, Thornhill and Eliza established themselves on a prime fishing site granted by Eliza's lineage. The area, known as Thornhill's Landing, became a stopping point for riverboats traveling up the Skeena River. While Eliza hunted, trapped, and traded furs, Tom farmed the land, producing vegetables and flowers for the riverboats. The couple's cabin also served as a host site for travellers.

== Death and legacy ==
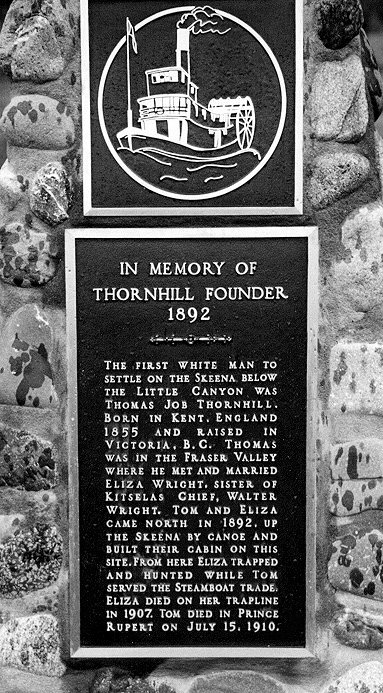
Monument to Tom Thornhill, located under the Dudley Little Bridge, at Thornhill Landing, in Thornhill, British Columbia. The Tom and Eliza Thornhill Monument was commemorated on July 30, 1993.

Tom Thornhill died in 1910, three years after Eliza's death in 1907. He is buried in the Garden Island Cemetery, near Prince Rupert. Thornhill's 186-acre homestead, claimed under the Homestead Act of 1906, was later sold and contributed to the development of the Skeena River Valley.

=== Commemoration ===
Thornhill's contributions are honoured through various memorials and landmarks:

- In 1993, a monument dedicated to Tom and Eliza Thornhill was installed on Queensway Drive, under the Dudley Little Bridge, close to the site of their original cabin.
- The community of Thornhill bears his name, symbolizing his enduring legacy in the region.
- Thornhill Landing Park, located at the site of the couple's homestead, offers access to the Skeena River and commemorates their pioneering spirit.

== Cultural and historical significance ==
Tom and Eliza's story highlights the intersection of European settler and Indigenous histories in British Columbia. Their partnership exemplifies early intercultural relationships and their role in shaping local communities. Eliza's significant contributions as a trapper and community member also emphasize the often-overlooked role of Indigenous women in settler history.

The couple's memory continues to be celebrated as a symbol of the historical ties between Indigenous peoples and settlers in the Skeena Valley. Efforts to rename local landmarks, such as restoring the name of Sockeye Creek to Eliza Creek, further underscore the importance of their legacy.
