= Caledonia Senior Secondary School =

Location
- 3605 Munroe Street; Terrace, British Columbia, V8G 3C4; Canada
- Coordinates: 54.52486°N 128.60658°W

Information
- School type: Public Secondary School
- School board: School District 82 Coast Mountains
- Principal: Keith Axelson
- Grades: 10-12
- Language: English
- Mascot: Kermode Bear
- Website: caledonia.cmsd.bc.ca

Caledonia Senior Secondary School is a senior secondary school (grades 10 through 12 inclusive) in Terrace, British Columbia, Canada. The school's address is 3605 Monroe St., Terrace, British Columbia, Canada, V8G 3C4.

== Activities ==
=== Sports ===
Caledonia provides sports teams in the area of volleyball, basketball, track and field, Rugby and soccer for both girls and boys. The sports teams are called Kermodes.

=== Arts ===
Caledonia offers a variety of artistic courses. Courses like photography, woodworking, metalworking, and Arts and Foundations 11/12. Students' artwork can be displayed all over the school on the walls and in the cabinets.

=== Music ===
Caledonia has a music program consisting of a Choir, Jazz Band, and Concert band, all run by Geoff Parr. The Bands and Choir participate in the annual Music Festival in town, competing against other participants. Each year the music students fundraise for a music tour. The music students also contribute to Caledonia's annual musical production, which is co-produced by Geoff Parr and Robin MacLeod.

=== Theatre ===
Caledonia Senior also has a successful theatre program, directed by Robin MacLeod, who is also the co-producer of the school's annual musical production.

Caledonia currently ranks 193 in school rankings according to the Fraser Institute.
