= Regional District of Kitimat–Stikine =

Regional district in British Columbia, Canada

Kitimat–Stikine
- Regional district
- Regional District of Kitimat–Stikine
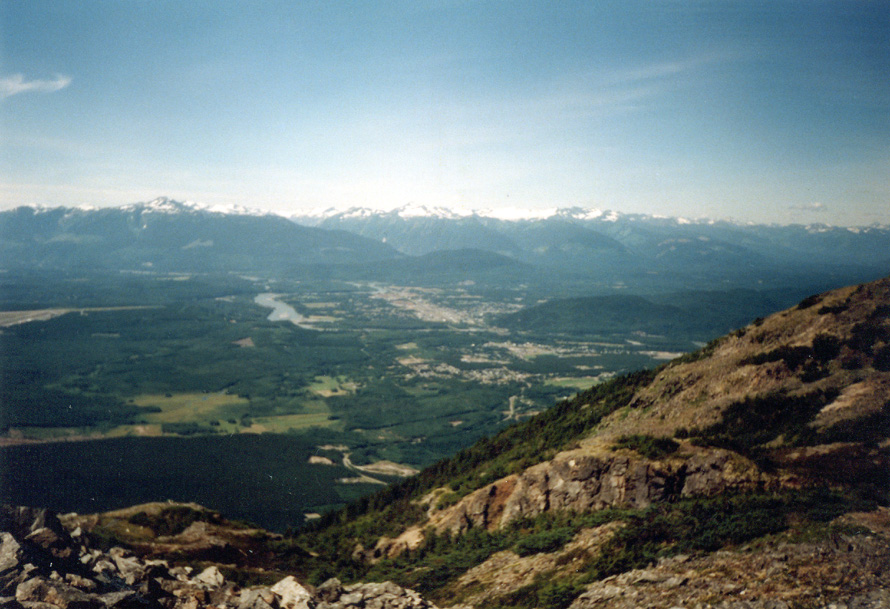
- Terrace townsite

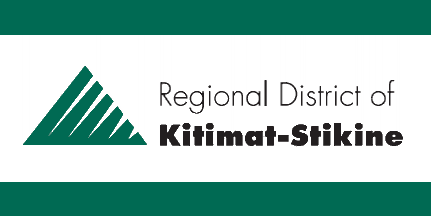
- Flag Logo

- Location in British Columbia
- Country: Canada
- Province: British Columbia
- Administrative office location: Terrace

Government
  - Type: Regional district
  - Body: Board of directors
  - Chair: Philip Germuth (Kitimat)
  - Vice chair: James Cordeiro (Terrace)
  - Electoral areas: A; B; C; D; E; F

Area (2021)
  - Land: 104,307.25 km^{2} (40,273.25 sq mi)

Population (2021)
  - Total: 37,790
  - Density: 0.4/km^{2} (1.0/sq mi)
- Website: www.rdks.bc.ca

The Regional District of Kitimat–Stikine is a local government administration in northwestern British Columbia, Canada. As of the 2021 Canadian census, it had a population of 37,790 living on a land area of 104,307.25 km^{2} (40,273.25 sq mi). Its administrative offices are in the city of Terrace. The next-largest municipality in the regional district is the District Municipality of Kitimat. The other incorporated municipalities in the regional district are the Village of Hazelton, the District of New Hazelton and the District of Stewart. There are many unincorporated communities, most of them Indian reserves which are not part of the governmental system of the regional district, which has limited powers relating mostly to municipal-type services. The remote settlement of Dease Lake, formerly in the Stikine Region, was added to the regional district on December 1, 2007. Thornhill (Kitimat-Stikine E (Regional district electoral area) [Census subdivision]) is the largest unincorporated community in the regional district with a population of 3,932 residents.

== Municipalities ==
Municipality	Government type	Population (2021)	Population (2016)	% change
Terrace	city	12,017	11,643	3.2
Kitimat	district municipality	8,236	8,131	1.3
Thornhill (Kitimat-Stikine E)	unincorporated community	3,932	3,993	-1,5
New Hazelton	district municipality	602	580	3.8
Stewart	district municipality	517	401	28.9
Hazelton	village	257	313	-17.9

== Demographics ==
Population history
Year	Pop.	±%
1996	43,618	—
2001	40,876	−6.3%
2006	37,999	−7.0%
2011	37,361	−1.7%
2016	37,367	+0.0%
2021	37,790	+1.1%
Source: Statistics Canada

As a census division in the 2021 Canadian census conducted by Statistics Canada, the Regional District of Kitimat–Stikine had a population of 37,790 living in 15,306 of its 17,386 total private dwellings, a change of 1.1% from its 2016 population of 37,367. With a land area of 104,307.25 km^{2} (40,273.25 sq mi), it had a population density of 0.4/km^{2} (0.9/sq mi) in 2021.

Panethnic groups in the Kitimat–Stikine Regional District (1991−2021)
Panethnic group	2021		2016		2011		2006		2001		1996		1991	
Panethnic group	Pop.	%	Pop.	%	Pop.	%	Pop.	%	Pop.	%	Pop.	%	Pop.	%
European (Note: Statistic includes all persons that did not make up part of a visible minority or an indigenous identity.)	21,590	57.93%	21,960	59.45%	23,040	62.23%	23,850	63.07%	27,975	68.7%	31,230	71.89%	29,135	69.53%
Indigenous	13,415	35.99%	13,265	35.91%	12,660	34.19%	12,275	32.46%	10,960	26.92%	10,210	23.5%	10,670	25.46%
South Asian	895	2.4%	575	1.56%	520	1.4%	995	2.63%	975	2.39%	1,005	2.31%	1,385	3.31%
Southeast Asian (Note: Statistic includes total responses of "Filipino" and "Southeast Asian" under visible minority section on census.)	480	1.29%	355	0.96%	380	1.03%	195	0.52%	225	0.55%	205	0.47%	160	0.38%
East Asian (Note: Statistic includes total responses of "Chinese", "Korean", and "Japanese" under visible minority section on census.)	435	1.17%	330	0.89%	250	0.68%	285	0.75%	235	0.58%	480	1.1%	355	0.85%
African	230	0.62%	210	0.57%	40	0.11%	85	0.22%	170	0.42%	160	0.37%	140	0.33%
Latin American	110	0.3%	140	0.38%	55	0.15%	85	0.22%	135	0.33%	75	0.17%	30	0.07%
Middle Eastern (Note: Statistic includes total responses of "West Asian" and "Arab" under visible minority section on census.)	45	0.12%	25	0.07%	0	0%	0	0%	10	0.02%	30	0.07%	30	0.07%
Other (Note: Statistic includes total responses of "Visible minority, n.i.e." and "Multiple visible minorities" under visible minority section on census.)	70	0.19%	80	0.22%	55	0.15%	40	0.11%	35	0.09%	50	0.12%	—N/a	—N/a
Total responses	37,270	98.62%	36,940	98.86%	37,025	99.1%	37,815	99.52%	40,720	99.62%	43,440	99.59%	41,905	99.65%
Total population	37,790	100%	37,367	100%	37,361	100%	37,999	100%	40,876	100%	43,618	100%	42,053	100%
Note: Totals greater than 100% due to multiple origin responses.

== Climate ==
Climate normals are from Northwest Regional Airport Terrace-Kitimat, located 3 nautical miles (5.6 km; 3.5 mi) south of Terrace (about 10 km (6.2 mi) south of downtown).

Climate data for Terrace (Terrace Airport) WMO ID: 71951; coordinates 54°27′59″N 128°34′39″W; elevation: 217.3 m (713 ft); 1991–2020 normals, extremes 1953–present
Month	Jan	Feb	Mar	Apr	May	Jun	Jul	Aug	Sep	Oct	Nov	Dec	Year
Record high humidex	8.4	12.6	20.5	28.0	34.6	38.0	39.3	38.5	34.1	23.3	14.5	12.5	39.3
Record high °C (°F)	9.4 (48.9)	12.7 (54.9)	20.8 (69.4)	26.0 (78.8)	34.6 (94.3)	36.5 (97.7)	37.3 (99.1)	36.2 (97.2)	32.2 (90.0)	21.4 (70.5)	13.4 (56.1)	11.3 (52.3)	37.3 (99.1)
Mean daily maximum °C (°F)	−1.4 (29.5)	1.6 (34.9)	5.6 (42.1)	11.0 (51.8)	16.4 (61.5)	19.1 (66.4)	21.5 (70.7)	21.4 (70.5)	16.1 (61.0)	9.1 (48.4)	3.0 (37.4)	−0.4 (31.3)	10.3 (50.5)
Daily mean °C (°F)	−3.3 (26.1)	−1.0 (30.2)	2.1 (35.8)	6.4 (43.5)	11.2 (52.2)	14.3 (57.7)	16.6 (61.9)	16.5 (61.7)	12.2 (54.0)	6.4 (43.5)	1.2 (34.2)	−2.1 (28.2)	6.7 (44.1)
Mean daily minimum °C (°F)	−5.3 (22.5)	−3.5 (25.7)	−1.3 (29.7)	1.8 (35.2)	5.8 (42.4)	9.3 (48.7)	11.7 (53.1)	11.6 (52.9)	8.3 (46.9)	3.6 (38.5)	−0.7 (30.7)	−3.9 (25.0)	3.1 (37.6)
Record low °C (°F)	−25.0 (−13.0)	−25.0 (−13.0)	−19.4 (−2.9)	−8.3 (17.1)	−2.7 (27.1)	0.6 (33.1)	3.3 (37.9)	2.8 (37.0)	−1.8 (28.8)	−13.5 (7.7)	−25.3 (−13.5)	−26.7 (−16.1)	−26.7 (−16.1)
Record low wind chill	−41.0	−35.9	−30.3	−14.5	−6.1	0	0	0	−4.4	−24	−41.7	−42.2	−42.2
Average precipitation mm (inches)	178.0 (7.01)	103.1 (4.06)	90.3 (3.56)	65.5 (2.58)	54.6 (2.15)	51.8 (2.04)	58.8 (2.31)	66.6 (2.62)	119.1 (4.69)	182.7 (7.19)	190.2 (7.49)	177.5 (6.99)	1,338 (52.68)
Average rainfall mm (inches)	95.6 (3.76)	58.2 (2.29)	56.4 (2.22)	60.1 (2.37)	53.7 (2.11)	51.8 (2.04)	58.8 (2.31)	66.6 (2.62)	119.1 (4.69)	178.1 (7.01)	133.6 (5.26)	91.2 (3.59)	1,023.2 (40.28)
Average snowfall cm (inches)	91.5 (36.0)	47.4 (18.7)	34.6 (13.6)	5.0 (2.0)	0.6 (0.2)	0.0 (0.0)	0.0 (0.0)	0.0 (0.0)	0.0 (0.0)	4.6 (1.8)	54.6 (21.5)	89.5 (35.2)	327.6 (129.0)
Average precipitation days (≥ 0.2 mm)	20.7	14.3	17.3	15.7	14.7	15.5	14.9	14.1	17.7	21.5	21.7	21.5	209.6
Average rainy days (≥ 0.2 mm)	11.8	9.6	13.0	14.9	14.7	15.5	14.9	14.1	17.7	21.2	17.3	11.2	175.8
Average snowy days (≥ 0.2 cm)	14.6	9.0	9.5	2.8	0.28	0.0	0.0	0.0	0.0	1.3	9.7	16.5	63.7
Average relative humidity (%) (at 1500 LST)	80.4	73.2	63.7	54.1	49.5	53.0	55.3	56.8	67.3	78.2	85.1	85.1	66.8
Source: Environment and Climate Change Canada
