= Charles Nelson (Tsimshian chief) =

- Xpilaxha
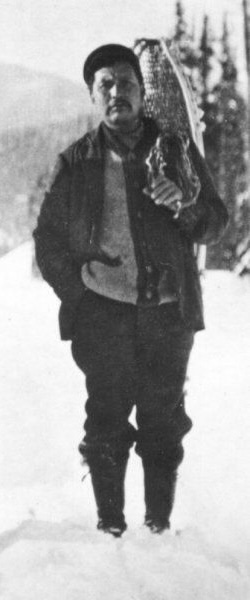
- Charles Nelson.
- Pronunciation: SPEE-la-haa
- Born: 1868
- Died: March 19, 1930; Terrace, British Columbia
- Known for: Indigenous rights activism
- Spouse: Emma Nelson
- Children: 9

Charles Nelson (1868 – March 19, 1930) was a Chief of the Ganhada (Raven) house of the Kitsumkalum Tribe of the Tsimshian Nation, located in British Columbia, Canada. His traditional name, Xpilaxha, roughly translates to “halfway to heaven.” Nelson and his wife, Emma Nelson, played a prominent role in the early history of the Terrace, British Columbia area.

== Early life and family ==
Charles Nelson was born in the mid-19th century, in 1868, and became a notable figure among the Kitsumkalum people. He married Emma Nelson (née Starr), who held a high name within the Gisbutwada (Killer Whale) house of the Kitsumkalum. Together, they raised nine children: Grace, Cecilia, Elizabeth, Josephine, Miriam, Gordon, Charlie Jr., Billy, and Dave.

== Contributions and legacy ==
Charles and Emma Nelson were integral to the development of the Terrace area during the early 20th century. They provided food, hospitality, and local knowledge to European settlers. The couple operated a general store at Kitsumkalum and supported local economic development, including investing in George Little's sawmill, a foundational industry for Terrace. Despite their contributions, historical narratives often understate their role in the region's development.

Nelson was also an advocate for Indigenous rights. In 1915, he appeared before the McKenna-McBride Royal Commission, demanding land rights for his people. He argued for ownership and autonomy, challenging the restrictive policies of the Indian Act.

=== Injury and death ===
Nelson sustained severe injuries in a railway accident during a snowstorm when his dogsled was struck by a Grand Trunk Pacific Railway snowplow. This accident left him disabled.

He died on March 19, 1930, at the age of 62.

=== Recognition ===
In May 2024, the Grand Trunk Pathway in Terrace was renamed the Xpilaxha – Charles and Emma Nelson Trail in honour of the couple's contributions to the region. The renaming ceremony was part of broader reconciliation efforts, recognizing the Tsimshian Nation's history and contributions.
