= Terrace, British Columbia =

Terrace
- City
- City of Terrace
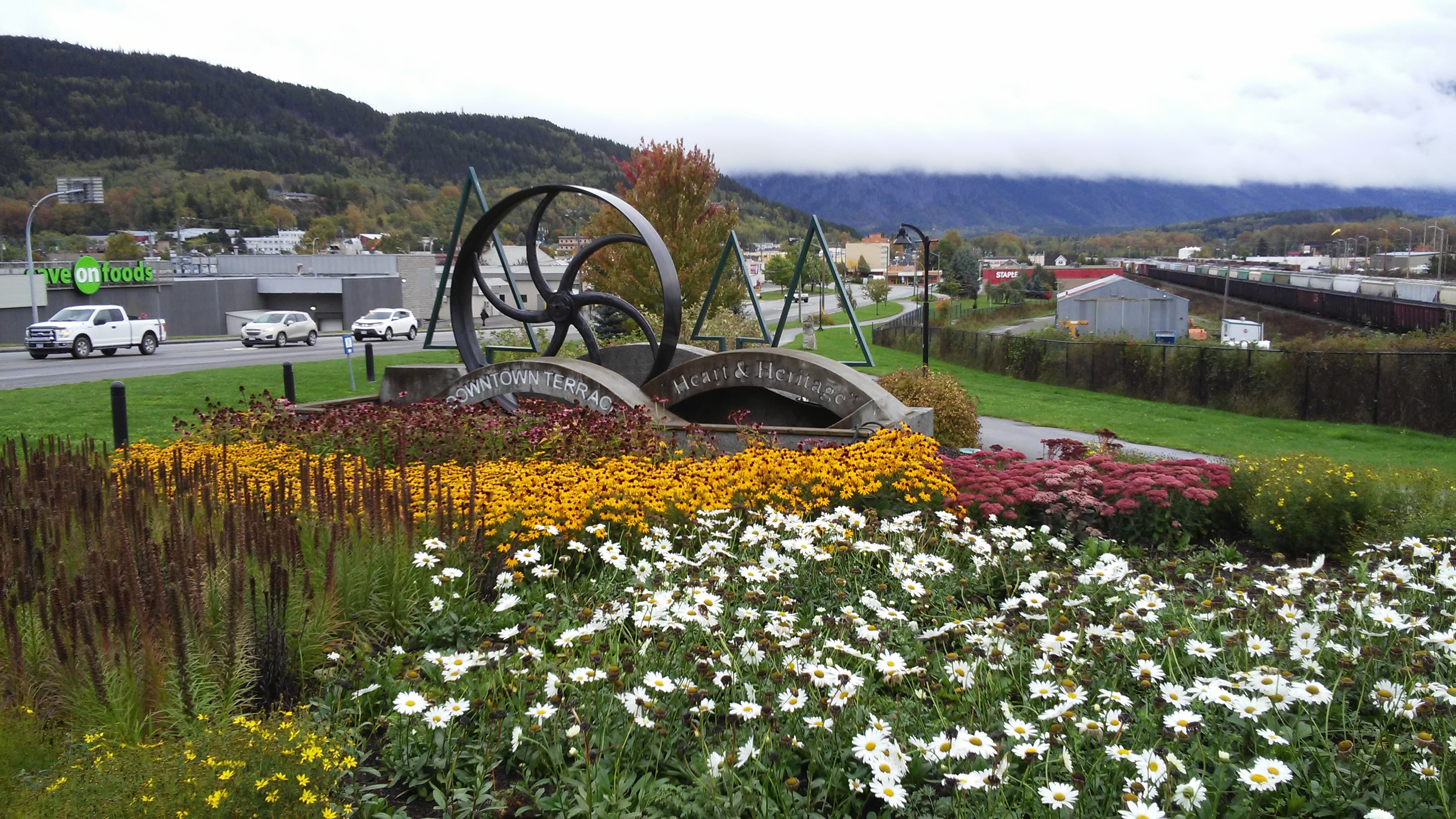
- Downtown Terrace, 2017.

- Flag

- Location of Terrace
- Coordinates: 54°30′59″N 128°35′59″W
- Country: Canada
- Province: British Columbia
- Region: Skeena
- Regional district: Kitimat–Stikine
- Incorporated: 1927 (village); 1987 (district municipality)

Government
  - Mayor: Sean Bujtas
  - City Council: Chris Apps; James Cordeiro; Joe Lavoie; Jesse Olinyk; Keenan Stella; Nikki Villeneuve

Area (2021)
  - Land: 57.33 km^{2} (22.14 sq mi)
- Elevation: 69 m (226 ft)

Population (2021)
  - Total: 12,017
  - Density: 209.6/km^{2} (542.9/sq mi)
  - Demonym: Terracite
- Time zone: UTC−07:00 (PT)
- Postal prefix: V8G
- Area codes: 250, 778, 236, & 672
- Highways: Highway 16; Highway 37; Highway 113
- Website: terrace.ca

Terrace is a city in the Skeena region of west central British Columbia, Canada. This regional hub lies east of the confluence of the Kitsumkalum River into the Skeena River. On BC Highway 16, junctions branch northward for the Nisga'a Highway (BC Highway 113) to the west and southward for the Stewart–Cassiar Highway (BC Highway 37) to the east. The locality is by road about 204 km (127 mi) southwest of Smithers and 144 km (89 mi) east of Prince Rupert. Transportation links are the Northwest Regional Airport Terrace-Kitimat, a passenger train, and bus services.

== History ==
=== First Nations and early explorers ===
The Kitsumkalum and Kitselas, who have inhabited the area for about 6,000 years, traded with other villages along the Skeena. From the 1780s, European and Russian fur traders passed through. From the mid-1800s, the forestry, mining and salmon resources drew new settlers.

The Kitsumkalum First Nation own the Kitsumkaylum Indian Reserve No. 1 which is immediately west of Kitsumkalum River. The Tsimshian word for Terrace is ganeexs (meaning "ladder" or "steps"), likely a reference to the stepped terraces of the surrounding landscape.

=== Steamboat era ===
The first sternwheeler to attempt the Skeena was the Union in 1865, which transported supplies for the construction of the Collins Overland Telegraph line. The Mumford, which was the replacement the next year, may have reached 3.2 km (2 mi) upstream on the Skeena from the Kitsumkalum mouth (Terrace), but travel beyond the mouth may have been by canoe only.

Over the following decades, river traffic increased. Settlements and woodpile fuel stops developed along the riverbanks. In 1912, the only two sternwheelers remaining on the Skeena were the Hudson's Bay Company's (HBC) Port Simpson and the chartered Foley, Welch and Stewart (FW&S) Inlander, which the Skeena segment of the railway made redundant that year.

Inaugurated in 1970, the Riverboat Days festival held each summer acknowledges this steamboat heritage.

=== Pioneer settlers ===
In 1892, Tom Thornhill was the first European settler in the area, establishing a homestead on what became Thornhill Landing and is remembered in the naming of Thornhill and the creek. Formerly, the general area was known as Little Canyon. named such to identify as not being the big canyon.

In 1898, George Little journeyed west from Ontario for the Klondike Gold Rush. He left the Yukon in 1905 and landed at Kitimat, from where he came north to the Skeena. That year, he pre-empted 65 ha (160 acres) centred around the foot of present Kalum Street. Harry Frank, who had taken up the first pre-emption in the district that year, had been visiting the area since 1894. Over the following decades, the Frank Bros Dairy, immediately west of the village, became the preeminent farm.

Arriving in 1907, Edward (Ed) Eby established a settlement in the vicinity of present lower Frank St. The place was briefly called Forester before becoming Kitsumkalum. He built a small hotel and general store. The next year, the post office opened in the store. In 1912, the hotel and store at the landing closed and were demolished.

Designated a national historic site in 1996, the cemetery was established in 1909. That year, George Little began sawmilling in the area. The next year, he opened a general store and laid out the townsite on his property. The Grand Trunk Pacific Railway (GTP) surveyors originally intended the townsite be near Kitsumkalum, but when George offered to donate 20 ha (50 acres) of his land for the railway right-of-way, station, and railyard, the GTP gladly accepted. In appreciation, the GTP allowed him to name the station. The earliest newspaper mention of the Littleton station name was August 1911 and of the Terrace location name was September 1911.

George Little was the inaugural postmaster 1912–1931. Since a Lyttleton post office existed in New Brunswick, the postal authorities demanded a new name. George chose Terrace to highlight the surrounding stepped landforms.

=== Earlier community ===
In 1913, a constable was stationed during the GTP construction. Designated a national historic site in 2006, some accounts indicate the former British Columbia Provincial Police (BCPP) building on the Lakelse Ave / Kalum Street corner was erected in 1912. However, 1913 appears more precise. That year, Knox Presbyterian Church and St. Matthews Anglican Church were also built and a co-op store established.

A Roman Catholic church was dedicated in 1915 but was replaced by a new building at a different location in 1917. Terrace Drugs opened next to the Terrace Hotel around 1918. The next year, a branch of the Bank of Montreal arrived.

In 1921, the legion hall was built. The next year, the liquor store opened and the co-op closed. In December 1927, Terrace was incorporated as a village.

In early 1931, fire destroyed the Agar's Garage and months later the power plant, putting the town in darkness. That year, Fred Bishop built a 100-seat theatre to show silent movies. He had been using the Oddfellows Hall since 1923. In 1933, he relocated and his theatre closed. Restored in early 1932, the electricity generating plant was again destroyed by fire late the following year. Agar's Garage was also badly damaged at this time. A lengthy delay occurred before power was restored.

During the mid-1930s to mid-1940s, Terrace had no bank after the Bank of Montreal closed. In 1938, the government liquor store and government telegraph office were destroyed by fire. The next year, heavy snow collapsed the legion hall roof.

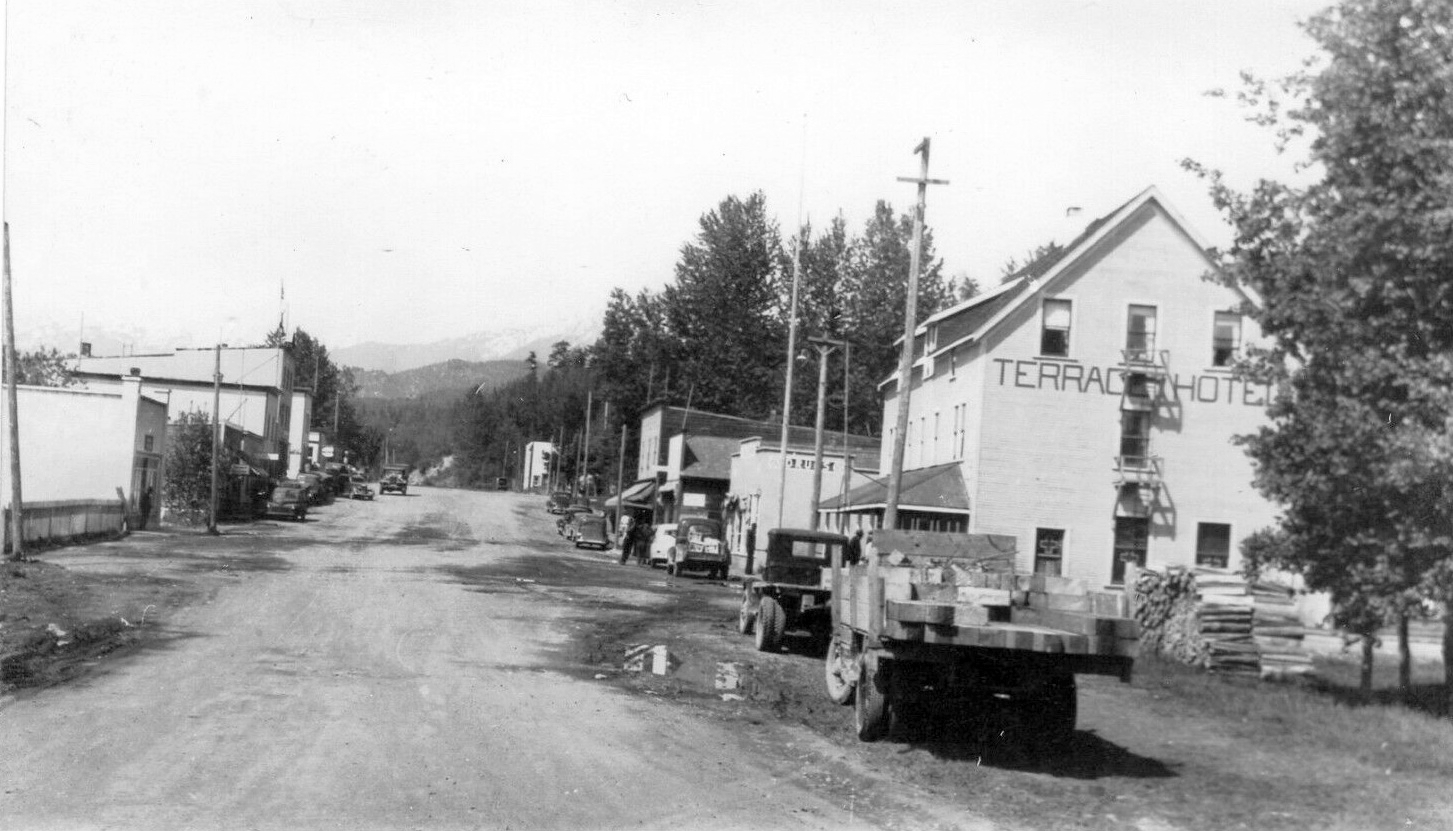
Kalum Street in 1944

In 1942, a military camp was constructed which would house about 3,000 soldiers during World War II. In 1943, Charlie Adam built a theatre to entertain the troops and highway workers. In 1944, the one-week Terrace mutiny occurred at the military camp and a new co-op store opened. In 1945, fire destroyed the village power plant, and the BC Power Commission took over the electricity supply the following month.

=== Post-World War II community ===
In 1946, a surplus Royal Canadian Air Force (RCAF) appliance became the first village fire truck. That year, a branch of the Royal Bank of Canada (RBC) opened. In 1949, Knox United Church burned down.

In 1950, the rebuilt Knox United Church opened. In 1954, Charlie Adam built the then Tillicum Theatre in its present location. In 1955, the civic centre (former army mess hall) was destroyed by fire. In 1958, a new civic centre was built in George Little Park. From 1958 to the late 1970s, the Tillicum Drive-in existed. In 1959, a dial telephone system replaced switchboard operators. St. Matthews Anglican Church building was relocated within town in the late 1950s and to the Gitanyow Reserve in 1971.

In 1960, the BC Hydro electricity supply switched from a local diesel plant to transmission lines from the Kemano Generating Station. In 1964, the present municipal building opened. About this time, the Anglicans bought the Dutch Reformed building when that congregation relocated. In 1965, the Knox United Church building was moved to the present site, enlarged, and dedicated the next year. At that time, Terrace had six hotels and seven motels. In 1967, the present Terrace Public Library and Museum building opened. Bill Young, who took over the movie venues that year, added a second indoor theatre in 1974. In 1968, The Terrace Shopping Centre opened on the former LH&K sawmill site.

In 1971, a blaze consumed the older section of the Terrace Hotel. Opening the next year were the new six-storey Terrace Hotel and the Terrace Arena (since renamed Terrace Sportsplex). In 1978, the Skeena Mall opened. The former Roman Catholic Church had been located in what became the parking lot.

Established in 1983, the Terrace Heritage Park Museum was designated a national historic site in 1996. Terrace incorporated as a district municipality in January 1987.

In 1993, a fire razed the 3200 block of Kalum Street destroying several historical commercial buildings.

In 1998, the co-op store closed.

=== Later community ===
In 2003, a time capsule was buried in Heritage Park to be opened in 2078. The next year, the Walmart store opened. In 2005, the SAAN store, present in Terrace since 1979, closed. The city bought the co-op property in 2005, and demolished the shopping centre structure in 2011 and former garden centre in 2022.

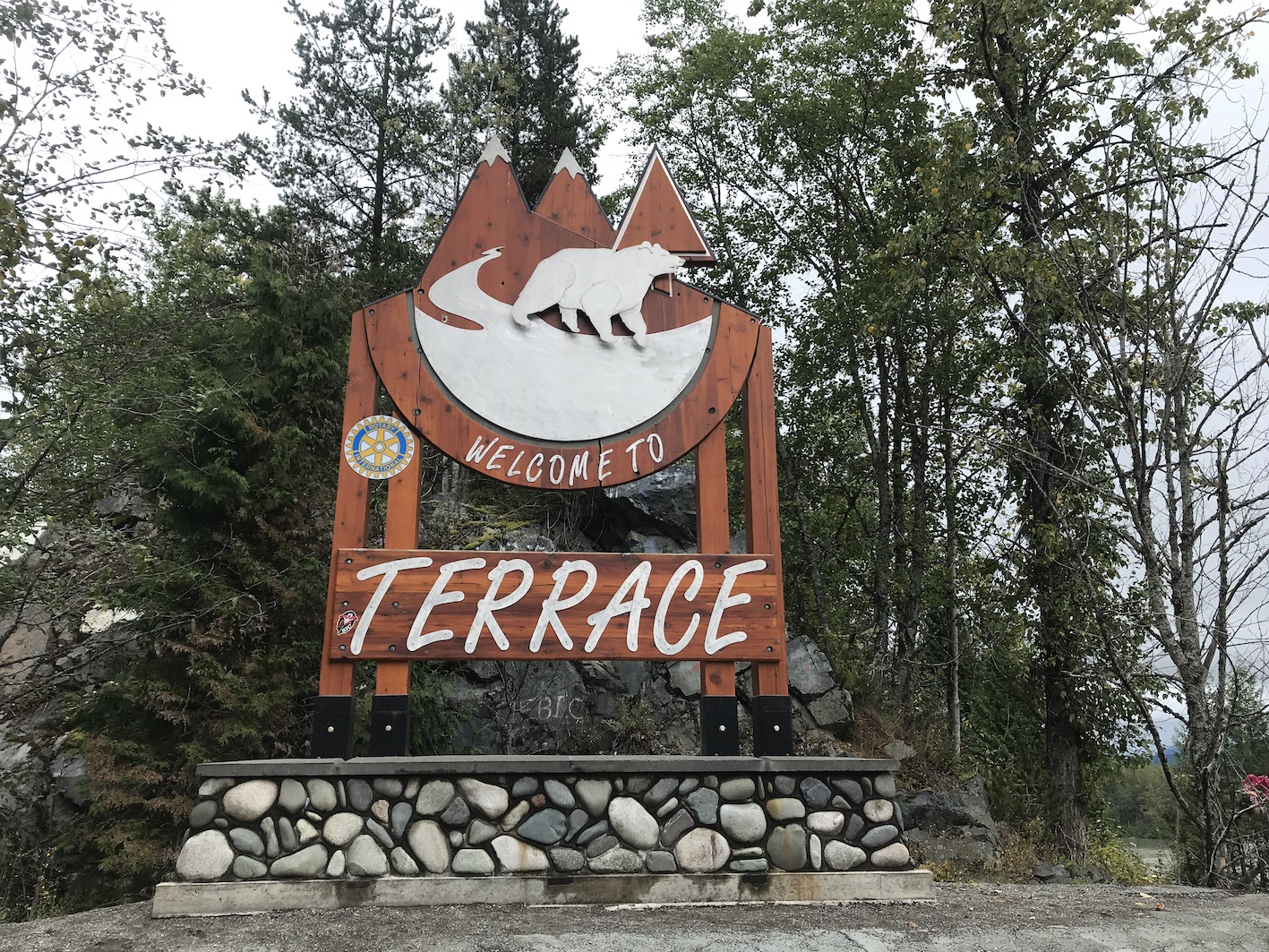
Terrace welcome sign in 2019

In 2006, the Terrace & District Credit Union, which was founded in 1945, merged with Northern Savings. In 2007, Phase I of the Terrace Sportsplex, which included a new ice arena, was completed.

In 2010, Terrace hosted the BC Winter Games. In 2017, fire destroyed the building which housed the original Bank of Montreal branch.

In 2023, the Métis negotiated a deal to buy the former co-op property, arranging finalization in June 2024.

== Geography ==
In the vicinity, the Skeena River includes rock outcroppings, gravel and sandbars, wetlands, sloughs, and islands. Significant regular floods have eroded the riverbanks, destroyed landings, and exposed archaeological sites. Over 25,000 years ago, the river cut through glaciers to create the benches (stepped terraces) and deposited well-drained sandy loamy soils suited for agriculture.

The surrounding ecosystem is a hybrid coastal-interior rainforest, which consists primarily of western red cedar, western hemlock, amabilis fir or "balsam" and Sitka spruce. The Hazelton Mountains are to the east, and the Kitimat Ranges of the Coast Mountains are to the west. The north–south active fault line through the Kitsumkalum-Kitimat Valley has created many hot springs in the area.

=== Climate ===
Being close to the Pacific Coast, Terrace has a continental climate (Köppen Dfb), closely bordering on an oceanic climate (Cfb) depending on the isotherm used. It has wet, cold winters (though much milder than inland places) and drier, warm summers, with an annual normal mean temperature of 6.7 °C (44.1 °F) varying between average temperature in January of −3.3 °C (26.1 °F) and in July 16.6 °C (61.9 °F). Average summer (June to August) temperatures are around 15.8 °C (60.4 °F), but temperatures over 32 °C (90 °F) have been recorded in every month from May to September and a maximum of 37.3 °C (99.1 °F) was recorded on 29 July 2009. The coldest temperature ever recorded was −26.7 °C (−16.1 °F) on 16 December 1964.

Terrace receives an average annual rainfall of 1,023.2 mm (40.28 in) and snowfall of 327.6 cm (128.98 in), water equivalence of 327.8 mm (12.91 in); totalling 1,338.0 mm (52.68 in) of precipitation, which is enough to sustain the lush vegetation of the area. October to February are the wettest months. Predominant winds are from the west and southwest, but occasional northerners during the winter bring snow in.

Climate data for Terrace (Terrace Airport) WMO ID: 71951; coordinates 54°27′59″N 128°34′39″W; elevation: 217.3 m (713 ft); 1991–2020 normals, extremes 1953–present
Month	Jan	Feb	Mar	Apr	May	Jun	Jul	Aug	Sep	Oct	Nov	Dec	Year
Record high humidex	8.4	12.6	20.5	28.0	34.6	38.0	39.3	38.5	34.1	23.3	14.5	12.5	39.3
Record high °C (°F)	9.4 (48.9)	12.7 (54.9)	20.8 (69.4)	26.0 (78.8)	34.6 (94.3)	36.5 (97.7)	37.3 (99.1)	36.2 (97.2)	32.2 (90.0)	21.4 (70.5)	13.4 (56.1)	11.3 (52.3)	37.3 (99.1)
Mean daily maximum °C (°F)	−1.4 (29.5)	1.6 (34.9)	5.6 (42.1)	11.0 (51.8)	16.4 (61.5)	19.1 (66.4)	21.5 (70.7)	21.4 (70.5)	16.1 (61.0)	9.1 (48.4)	3.0 (37.4)	−0.4 (31.3)	10.3 (50.5)
Daily mean °C (°F)	−3.3 (26.1)	−1.0 (30.2)	2.1 (35.8)	6.4 (43.5)	11.2 (52.2)	14.3 (57.7)	16.6 (61.9)	16.5 (61.7)	12.2 (54.0)	6.4 (43.5)	1.2 (34.2)	−2.1 (28.2)	6.7 (44.1)
Mean daily minimum °C (°F)	−5.3 (22.5)	−3.5 (25.7)	−1.3 (29.7)	1.8 (35.2)	5.8 (42.4)	9.3 (48.7)	11.7 (53.1)	11.6 (52.9)	8.3 (46.9)	3.6 (38.5)	−0.7 (30.7)	−3.9 (25.0)	3.1 (37.6)
Record low °C (°F)	−25.0 (−13.0)	−25.0 (−13.0)	−19.4 (−2.9)	−8.3 (17.1)	−2.7 (27.1)	0.6 (33.1)	3.3 (37.9)	2.8 (37.0)	−1.8 (28.8)	−13.5 (7.7)	−25.3 (−13.5)	−26.7 (−16.1)	−26.7 (−16.1)
Record low wind chill	−41.0	−35.9	−30.3	−14.5	−6.1	0	0	0	−4.4	−24	−41.7	−42.2	−42.2
Average precipitation mm (inches)	178.0 (7.01)	103.1 (4.06)	90.3 (3.56)	65.5 (2.58)	54.6 (2.15)	51.8 (2.04)	58.8 (2.31)	66.6 (2.62)	119.1 (4.69)	182.7 (7.19)	190.2 (7.49)	177.5 (6.99)	1,338 (52.68)
Average rainfall mm (inches)	95.6 (3.76)	58.2 (2.29)	56.4 (2.22)	60.1 (2.37)	53.7 (2.11)	51.8 (2.04)	58.8 (2.31)	66.6 (2.62)	119.1 (4.69)	178.1 (7.01)	133.6 (5.26)	91.2 (3.59)	1,023.2 (40.28)
Average snowfall cm (inches)	91.5 (36.0)	47.4 (18.7)	34.6 (13.6)	5.0 (2.0)	0.6 (0.2)	0.0 (0.0)	0.0 (0.0)	0.0 (0.0)	0.0 (0.0)	4.6 (1.8)	54.6 (21.5)	89.5 (35.2)	327.6 (129.0)
Average precipitation days (≥ 0.2 mm)	20.7	14.3	17.3	15.7	14.7	15.5	14.9	14.1	17.7	21.5	21.7	21.5	209.6
Average rainy days (≥ 0.2 mm)	11.8	9.6	13.0	14.9	14.7	15.5	14.9	14.1	17.7	21.2	17.3	11.2	175.8
Average snowy days (≥ 0.2 cm)	14.6	9.0	9.5	2.8	0.28	0.0	0.0	0.0	0.0	1.3	9.7	16.5	63.7
Average relative humidity (%) (at 1500 LST)	80.4	73.2	63.7	54.1	49.5	53.0	55.3	56.8	67.3	78.2	85.1	85.1	66.8
Source: Environment and Climate Change Canada

== Demographics ==
Census population: Terrace
Year	Pop.	±%
1931	352	—
1941	355	+0.9%
1951	961	+170.7%
1956	1,473	+53.3%
1961*	5,940	+303.3%
1966	8,637	+45.4%
1971	9,991	+15.7%
1976	10,251	+2.6%
1981	10,914	+6.5%
1986	10,532	−3.5%
1991	11,433	+8.6%
1996	12,779	+11.8%
2001	12,109	−5.2%
2006	11,320	−6.5%
2011	11,486	+1.5%
2016	11,643	+1.4%
2021	12,017	+3.2%
Source: * Partially attributed to the 1960 boundary extension.

In the 2021 Canadian census conducted by Statistics Canada, Terrace had a population of 12,017 living in 4,873 of its 5,200 total private dwellings, a change of 3.2% from its 2016 population of 11,643. With a land area of 57.33 km^{2} (22.14 sq mi), it had a population density of 209.6/km^{2} (542.9/sq mi) in 2021.

=== Religion ===
While many Sikhs in sawmill-based towns throughout the interior relocated to urban areas during the 1990s and 2000s, Terrace experienced growth in the Sikh population between 2011 and 2021 after two decades of decline.

Religious groups in the City of Terrace (1991−2021)
Religious group	2021		2011		2001		1991	
Religious group	Pop.	%	Pop.	%	Pop.	%	Pop.	%
Irreligion	6,520	55.14%	5,185	45.86%	3,995	33.24%	3,105	27.41%
Christianity	4,410	37.29%	5,745	50.82%	7,505	62.44%	7,470	65.93%
Sikhism	390	3.3%	265	2.34%	350	2.91%	610	5.38%
Hinduism	145	1.23%	0	0%	40	0.33%	65	0.57%
Indigenous	65	0.55%	0	0%	—N/a	—N/a	—N/a	—N/a
Buddhism	45	0.38%	35	0.31%	25	0.21%	20	0.18%
Islam	40	0.34%	0	0%	20	0.17%	15	0.13%
Judaism	30	0.25%	0	0%	10	0.08%	0	0%
Other	185	1.56%	70	0.62%	90	0.75%	50	0.44%
Total responses	11,825	98.4%	11,305	98.42%	12,020	99.27%	11,330	99.1%
Total population	12,017	100%	11,486	100%	12,109	100%	11,433	100%

=== Ethnicity ===
As of the 2021 census in the Terrace census agglomeration area, the panethnic breakdown is European (68.28%), Indigenous (25.76%), South Asian (3.29%), East Asian (1.02%), Southeast Asian (1.07%), African (0.29%), Latin American (0.21%), and Middle Eastern (0.08%).

Panethnic groups in the City of Terrace (1986−2021)
Panethnic group	2021		2016		2011		2006		2001		1996		1991		1986	
Panethnic group	Pop.	%	Pop.	%	Pop.	%	Pop.	%	Pop.	%	Pop.	%	Pop.	%	Pop.	%
European^{a}	7,940	67.15%	7,820	68.6%	8,080	71.44%	7,930	70.84%	9,525	79.24%	10,475	82.74%	9,025	79.66%	8,475	81.1%
Indigenous	2,600	21.99%	2,690	23.6%	2,560	22.63%	2,380	21.26%	1,775	14.77%	1,280	10.11%	1,390	12.27%	1,440	13.78%
South Asian	700	5.92%	375	3.29%	385	3.4%	690	6.16%	475	3.95%	560	4.42%	690	6.09%	435	4.16%
East Asian^{b}	255	2.16%	120	1.05%	90	0.8%	100	0.89%	45	0.37%	145	1.15%	90	0.79%	40	0.38%
Southeast Asian^{c}	195	1.65%	195	1.71%	145	1.28%	40	0.36%	95	0.79%	105	0.83%	115	1.02%	40	0.38%
African	60	0.51%	95	0.83%	15	0.13%	30	0.27%	70	0.58%	75	0.59%	10	0.09%	15	0.14%
Latin American	20	0.17%	60	0.53%	10	0.09%	20	0.18%	25	0.21%	0	0%	10	0.09%	5	0.05%
Middle Eastern^{d}	10	0.08%	15	0.13%	0	0%	0	0%	0	0%	0	0%	0	0%	0	0%
Other/multiracial^{e}	20	0.17%	10	0.09%	0	0%	0	0%	15	0.12%	0	0%	—N/a	—N/a	—N/a	—N/a
Total responses	11,825	98.4%	11,400	97.91%	11,310	98.47%	11,195	98.9%	12,020	99.27%	12,660	99.07%	11,330	99.1%	10,450	99.22%
Total population	12,017	100%	11,643	100%	11,486	100%	11,320	100%	12,109	100%	12,779	100%	11,433	100%	10,532	100%
Note: Totals greater than 100% due to multiple origin responses.

^a. Statistic includes all persons that did not make up part of a visible minority or an aboriginal identity.
^b. Statistic includes total responses of "Chinese", "Korean", and "Japanese" under visible minority section on census.
^c. Statistic includes total responses of "Filipino" and "Southeast Asian" under visible minority section on census.
^d. Statistic includes total responses of "West Asian" and "Arab" under visible minority section on census.
^e. Statistic includes total responses of "Visible minority, n.i.e." and "Multiple visible minorities" under visible minority section on census.

Major ethnic groups in the City of Terrace (2021 Canadian census)
Ethnic group	Population	Percentage
English	3,090 (Note: "English": 2,700 responses "British Isles, n.o.s.": 390 responses)	26.13%
First Nations	2,280 (Note: "Nisga'a": 550 responses "Tsimshian": 325 responses "Gitxsan": 290 responses "Dene": 175 responses "Haisla": 140 responses "Cree": 130 responses "Haida": 120 responses "Anishinaabe": 50 responses "Mi'kmaq": 55 responses "Salish": 50 responses "Iroquoian": 20 responses)	19.07%
Scottish	2,190	18.52%
Irish	1,795	15.18%
German	1,710	14.46%
Nordic & Scandinavian	1,185 (Note: "Norwegian": 630 responses "Swedish": 275 responses "Danish": 155 responses "Finnish": 80 responses "Icelandic": 45 responses)	10.02%
French	1,105 (Note: "French, n.o.s.": 915 responses "French Canadian": 130 responses "Acadian": 50 responses "Québécois": 10 responses)	9.34%
Dutch	755	6.38%
Portuguese	515	4.36%
Indian	510	4.31%
Ukrainian	440	3.72%
Italian	425	3.59%
Polish	380	3.21%
Métis	335	2.83%
Welsh	215	1.82%
Filipino	175	1.48%
Russian	150	1.27%
Chinese	140	1.18%
Swiss	130	1.1%
Hungarian	105	0.89%
Total responses	11,825	98.4%
Total population	12,017	100%
Note: Totals greater than 100% due to multiple origin responses

== Education ==
In 1911–12, the Kitsumkalum School opened, which also served Terrace.

In 1920–21, three classrooms were added. In 1924–25, the Kitsumkalum School rose to superior school status. In 1925–26, the Kitsumkalum Superior School rose to high school status.

In 1938–39, the high and elementary schools were renamed Terrace.

The 1946 implementation of the 1945 Cameron Report into BC school financing and administration created centralized larger districts. The establishment of School District 53 (Terrace) included the dissolving of such local school boards. Later mergers created School District 82 Coast Mountains.

In 1953, Skeena Secondary School was built. In 1955, Riverside became the elementary school name. This school had been housed in former army buildings since 1948. In 1956, Uplands Elementary opened. In January 1958, 270 pupils from Riverside moved into the new eight-classroom Cassie Hall Elementary.

In November 1963, further Riverside pupils moved into the new four-classroom Clarence Michiel Elementary. In 1967, E.T. Kenney Elementary opened. In September 1968, Caledonia Senior Secondary School opened. In 1969, Parkside Elementary opened and Riverside closed.

In 2003, a completely rebuilt Skeena Middle School (previously called Skeena Junior Secondary) opened.

In 2010, E.T. Kenney closed and the students moved to Clarence Michiel (later renamed Suwilaawks). That year, a never used and vacant for years school building opened as École Mountainview.

Operating at the secondary level are Caledonia Secondary School (grades 10–12), Parkside Secondary School (alternate), and Skeena Middle School (grades 7–9).

At the elementary level (grades K–6) are Cassie Hall Elementary School, École Mountainview (French Immersion), Suwilaawks Community School, Uplands Elementary School and École des Cinq-Saumons (grades K-9), the latter of which is operated by School District 93.

The two private schools are Veritas School (Roman Catholic) (grades K–9) (1959) and Centennial Christian School (interdenominational) (preschool–grade 12) (1969). Spring Creek Adventist School (1951) appears to have closed in the later 2010s.

Tertiary institutions are the main campus of the Coast Mountain College (1968) and a regional campus of the University of Northern British Columbia (UNBC) (2000).

== Transport ==
=== Railway ===
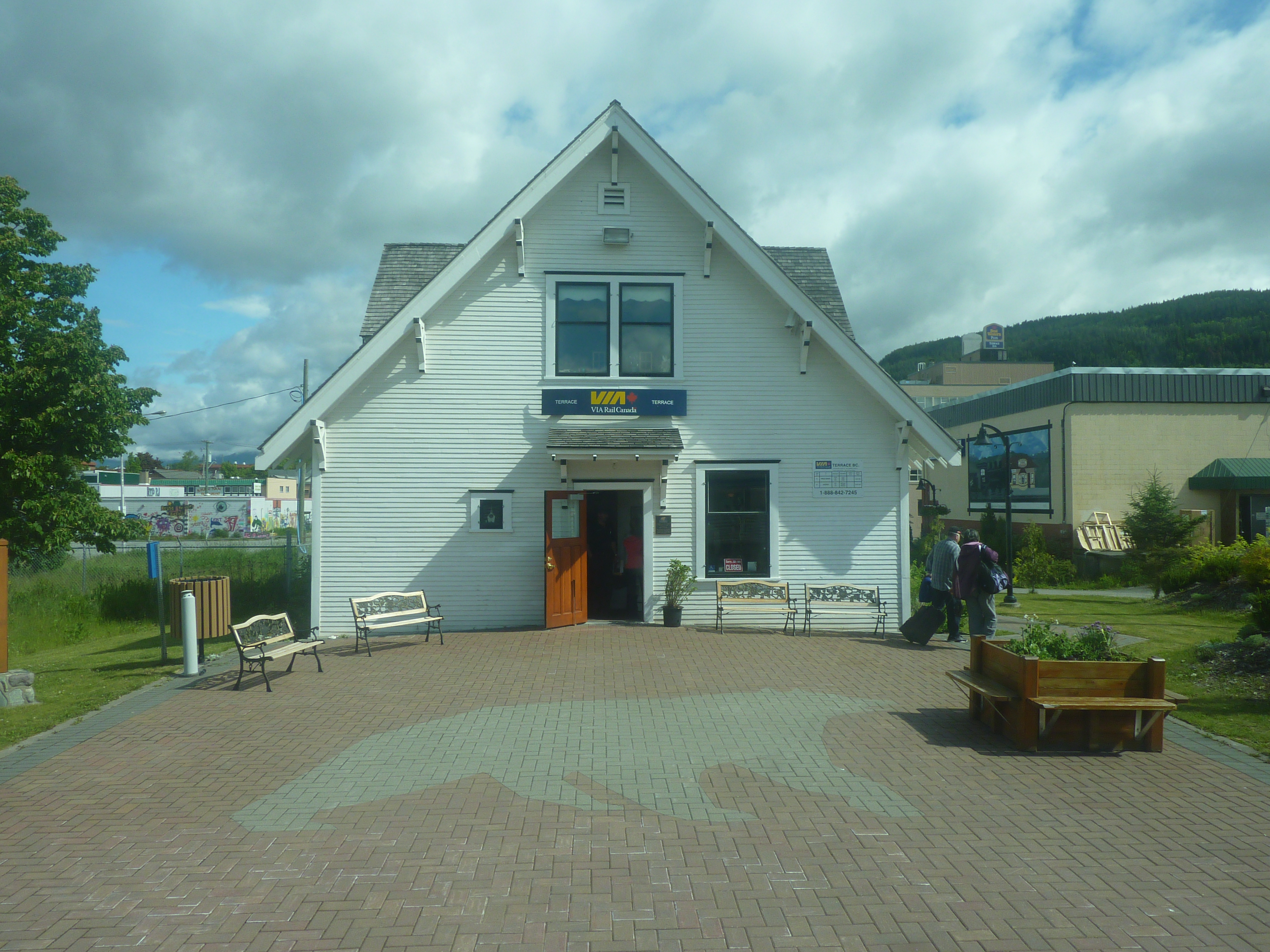
South end of George Little House, Terrace railway station, 2011

In late October 1910, the eastward advance of the Grand Trunk Pacific Railway rail head from Prince Rupert reached the Kitsumkalum River. In early November 1910, tracklaying passed over this completed bridge at Mile 91 and through mile 100 (Vanarsdol).

In 1911, the standard-design Plan 100‐152 (Bohi's Type E) station building was erected. The next year, when a roadmaster riding eastward on a railway motorcycle collided with an oncoming locomotive, he was fatally flung into the Skeena.

In 1927, a falling rock about one mile east of Terrace crashed through the roof of a westbound Canadian National Railway (CN) baggage car killing an employee. In 1929, an addition to the station enlarged the waiting room and the agent accommodation.

In June 1955, a Prince Rupert–Kitimat passenger shuttle began on a trial basis, which replaced the Kitimat mixed train. The line officially opened the next month, and the Kitimat station was completed later in the year.

In April 1957, the shuttle discontinued west of Terrace. In April 1958, when passenger rail was discontinued to Kitimat, a private bus operator took over the route. In 1988, Via Rail erected a stationette.

Built around 1914 and designated a national historic site in 1982, the George Little House was moved to its present location in 2004. The next year, the renovated main floor became tourism facilities and the Via Rail waiting room, replacing the stationette.

The Terrace station serves Via Rail's Jasper–Prince Rupert train.

=== Road transport ===
In 1920, a Terrace–Lakelse bus service began. By the early 1920s, wagon roads extended north to Kitsumkalum Lake, south to Lakelse Lake, west to Remo, and east to Copper River. Trails existed beyond these points.

The highway grew east and west of Terrace over the following decades, the key event being the completion of the Prince Rupert–Prince George route in 1944.

By 1955, a Prince Rupert–Terrace–Smithers bus service existed. In November 1957, when Highway 25 to Kitimat officially opened, the final 8.0 or 9.7 km (5 or 6 mi) were unfinished. A Caterpillar D9 dragged the first vehicle over this section. In 1958, a 110 km (70 mi) stretch of the Stewart–Cassiar Highway was completed, which connected the Nass Valley and Terrace. That year, Western Coach Lines inaugurated a Prince Rupert–Prince George bus service, which included a scheduled stop at Terrace. The next year, the company withdrew the service.

In 1960, when Prince Coach Lines assumed the Prince Rupert–Prince George route, only 121 km (75 mi) was paved. In 1966, when Canadian Coachways bought the company, only 121 km (75 mi) was still gravel.

In 1970, Greyhound Canada purchased Canadian Coachways.

Prior to ceasing all intraprovincial services in October 2018, Greyhound had eliminated the Prince Rupert–Prince George run that June. BC Bus North immediately assumed the route.

The current passenger transit providers are BC Bus North and BC Transit.

=== Ferries and road bridges ===
Around 1907, the Braun's Island bridge was built. Prior to completion of the Kitsumkalum River rail bridge in late 1910, a ferry operator used a rope to pull a rowboat ferry at the crossing. In 1911, a road bridge was constructed.

In 1912, a bridge was built to connect Ferry Road (now called Haugland Avenue) and Ferry Island, and a ferry was installed across the main channel of the Skeena. In June 1913, high water swept away the bridge. The Thornhill–Terrace cable ferry crossed the Skeena from near the mouth of Thornhill Creek to the island. The scow was a reaction ferry, but being much slower than later reaction pontoons, it required assistance by pulling on a rope when the current was weak. That October, when a worker was attempting to clear a snag on the lower cable of the ferry, he fell and drowned. The replacement bridge built the following winter was a howe truss.

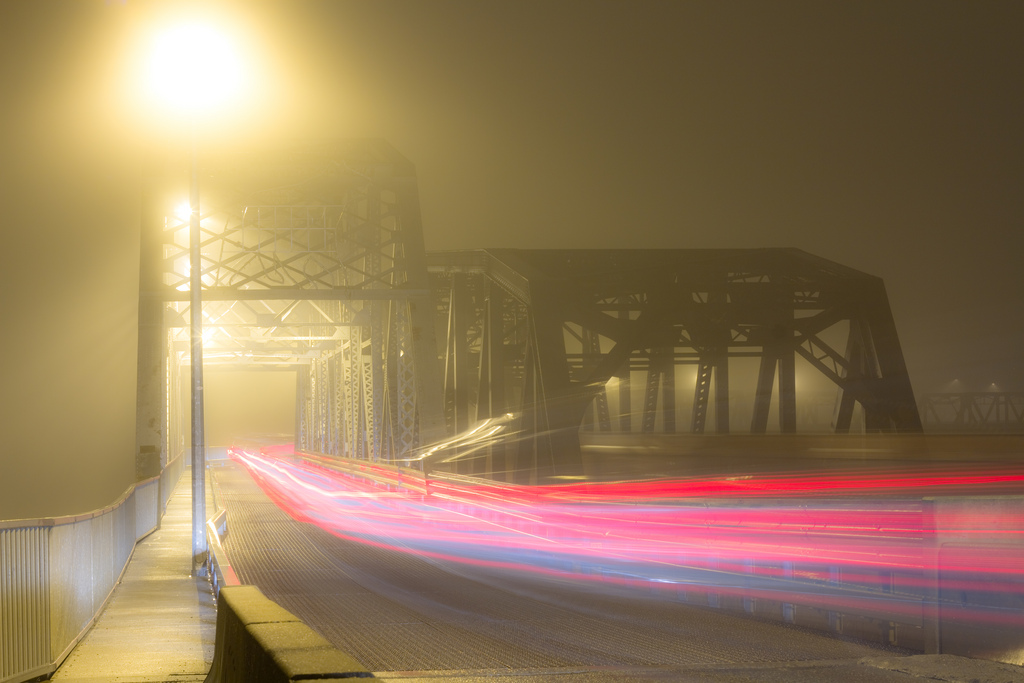
Old Skeena Bridge, 2010

In 1918–19, a 14 t; 13 long tons (15 short tons) pontoon reaction ferry was installed.

In 1921, the cable snapped sending the ferry downstream where the four people on board had a narrow escape. The badly damaged vessel appears to have been repaired.

In July 1925, the single-lane Old Skeena Bridge officially opened, and the ferry was discontinued.

In 1936, high water washed out four timber spans of the trestle approach on the south side of the bridge, which required the installation of a temporary catwalk.

The building of the adjacent railway bridge for the Kitimat branch in 1953 prompted a major reconstruction and renovation of the highway bridge. On realignment, many new spans and concrete piers were added, a new hardwood deck was installed, and the approaches changed.

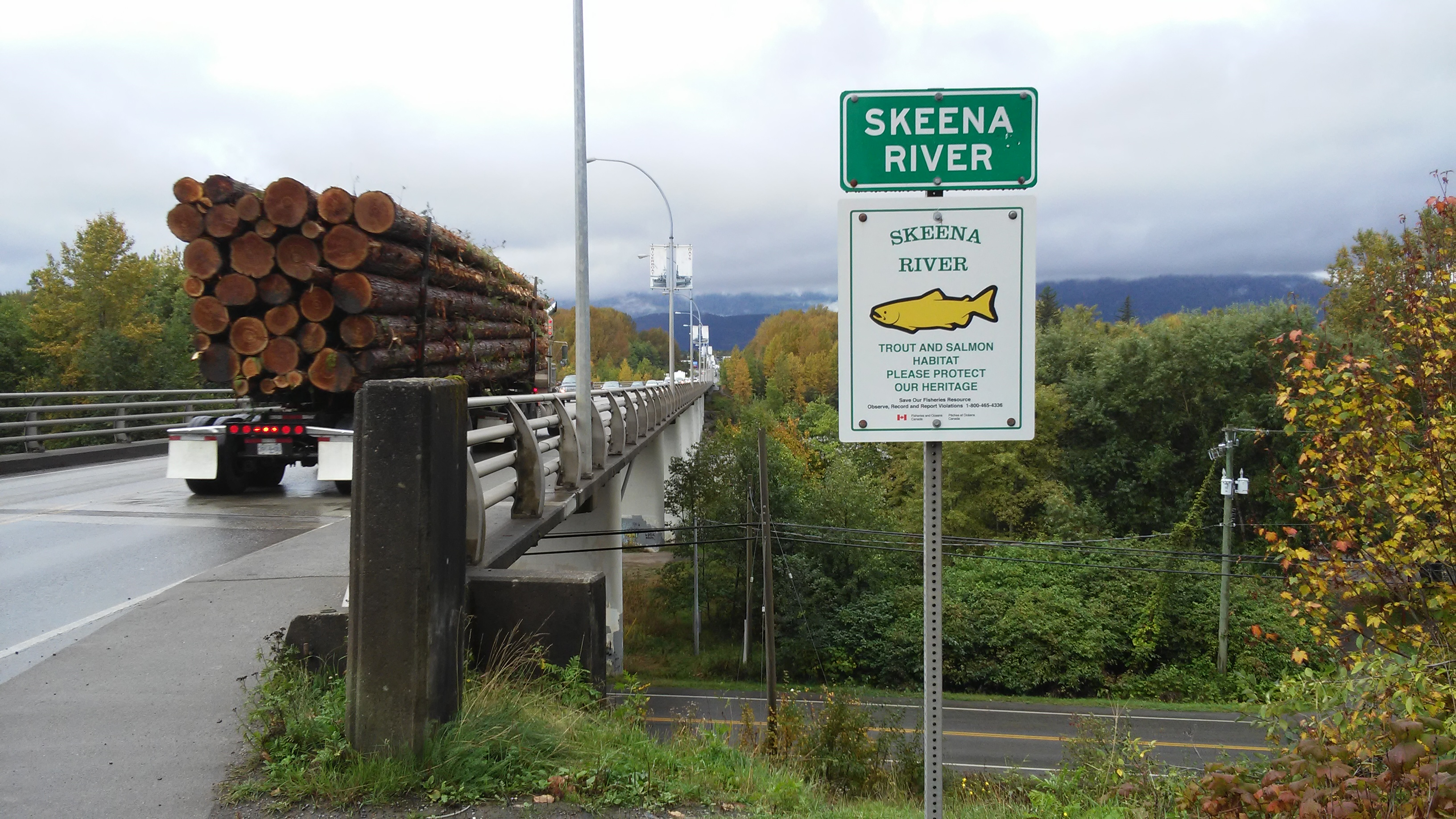
Skeena River (Dudley Little) bridges, 2017

The new (Dudley Little) Skeena River Bridge, costing $6.4 million, officially opened in October 1975. The two-lane roadway comprised a 240 m (780 ft) bridge over the west channel, a 340 m (1,100 ft) embankment across Ferry Island, and a 380 m (1,240 ft) bridge over the main channel.

In 2001, a grated steel deck replaced the wooden one on the Old Skeena Bridge. Up to that time, the structure had been the longest one-lane, wood-decked, curved bridge in North America. In 2005, the bridge was designated a national historic site. During 2022–2023, the bridge underwent a $22.6 million rehabilitation.

== Agriculture ==
Early settlers placed limited value on timber, believing agriculture was the future. Orchards of apples, pears, plums, cherries, and berries flourished. Various vegetables thrived, while much of the timber was burned as waste.

Terrace possesses the most favourable climatic conditions for agriculture in the Prince Rupert hinterland. The location is sufficiently close to the ocean to have the summer advantages of a marine climate offering a long frost-free period and higher night-time temperatures, yet sufficiently inland to experience relatively high day-time temperatures.

By 1920, this climate advantage had created a reputation for fine strawberries, fruit, and potatoes.

== Forestry ==
The forest industry drove the development of Terrace. The small Lillesberg sawmill opened in 1908, burned down in 1909, and was not rebuilt. That year, George Little established a small mill in the area, which became a substantial operation in 1911, and was described as a large lumber mill in 1915. During and following World War I, numerous small sawmills came and went.

When fire destroyed the Little's mill in 1921, most of the lumber and logs were saved. The mill was immediately rebuilt. During the 1920s, Terrace was known as the "pole capital of the world". Over 50,000 poles were manufactured annually to supply many parts of North America with telephone and electric power poles. The world's tallest pole, 49 m (162 ft) long, was cut in Terrace and stands in New York City.

In 1936, Little, Haugland and Kerr (LH&K) bought the George Little mill, which by 1940 was the largest employer in Terrace.

In 1943, fire completely gutted the mill. In 1948, Columbia Cellulose was granted logging rights covering 135,000 ha (334,000 acres) near Terrace, where its woodlands division was established, creating a post-war development boom. The Sandes mill, which employed 100 workers at its peak, operated 1946–1968.

In 1952, the Pohle Lumber mill relocated to Terrace. In 1956, Joslyn Manufacturing and Supply Co bought LH&K but closed the Terrace mill soon after purchase. In 1959, fire consumed the Pohle sawmill, planer mill, several boxcars, and stacks of finished lumber. The 1960 rebuild was an electrically powered modern mill.

By the mid-1960s, concerns were expressed about Terrace being totally dependent upon the lumber industry. In 1969 Columbia Cellulose purchased the Pohle Lumber mill operations.

In 1981, Canadian Cellulose was renamed BC Timber. In 1984, BC Timber was renamed Westar Timber. In 1986, Skeena Cellulose, a subsidiary of Repap Industries, bought the Westar assets. In 1988, Repap opened a new $45 million sawmill on the Pohle site in Terrace, which closed in 2001. Terrace Lumber Co ran this mill intermittently during 2005–2006.

== Healthcare ==
During the railway construction, Foley, Welch and Stewart (FW&S), the GTP prime contractor, established rudimentary medical facilities to treat injured workers along the route. Dr. Seymour Traynor, who arrived in 1910, had premises on Kalum Street. After GTP construction activities moved on, he remained until 1916. During World War I, the Terrace Hotel at Kalum Street and Greig Avenue was converted into a temporary hospital, where patients from the Spanish flu epidemic were treated by volunteer nurses.

After the war, several doctors practised from a small wooden medical building near the foot of Kalum Street, which Dr. Traynor built during a brief return to Terrace in 1919. The facility became a one-bed hospital with an x-ray machine in 1927. Dr. Stanley Gordon Mills, one of the first permanent doctors, arrived around 1930. His wife, Edith, a registered nurse, partnered in the medical care. During the 1936 Skeena flood, the United Church manse was converted into a temporary hospital. During World War II, a 300-bed military hospital was erected on the bench, on property now partly occupied by Terraceview Lodge.

After the war, the buildings were used for senior care and psychiatric patients but were considered too distant for a community hospital. In 1948, a 10-bed Red Cross outpost hospital opened on Haugland Ave. In 1951, the community assumed control, and the capacity soon doubled to 20 beds. In 1961, the 40-bed Terrace and District Hospital officially opened. The next year, the facility was renamed the Mills Memorial Hospital. In 1968, beds increased and an intensive care unit and a new laboratory and X-ray department were added. In 1977, a $6.3 million expansion was undertaken.

In 2021, Northern Health started building a 78-bed replacement for the current hospital at the northern end of the site. The new and larger Seven Sisters regional mental-health facility will increase from 20 beds to 25. Substantial completion and occupation was completed in 2024. However, final completion of the project will be in 2025.

In November 2024, Mills Memorial Hospital was renamed the Ksyen Regional Hospital. It officially opened its doors to patients on November 24, 2024.

== Culture and leisure ==
The McColl Playhouse (former Zion Baptist Church) has housed the Terrace Little Theatre since 1953. The REM Lee Theatre and the Pacific Northwest Music Festival have hosted regional artists since 1955.

The Kermodei Tourism Society (KTS) is the co-ordinator that promotes the development and marketing of tourism opportunities in Terrace and the surrounding region. The value of heritage visitors is especially recognized, who are drawn by both indigenous cultural heritage and historic locations within the city. The outdoor lifestyle is also emphasized.

During the summer, Terrace offers many outdoor activities, such as fishing for a wide range of freshwater fish, mountain biking, hiking, kiting and hunting in the surrounding areas. In the fall, many of Terrace's inhabitants go out to search for pine mushrooms (Tricholoma magnivelare), and pick berries. There is a variety of winter sports available in Terrace and the surrounding region including skiing and snowboarding at nearby Shames Mountain, as well as snowmobiling, ice fishing, curling, and ice skating.

In 2000, the Grand Trunk Pathway officially opened. In 2023, the western extension of the pathway was nearing completion.

In May 2024, the Grand Trunk Pathway was renamed the Xpilaxha – Charles and Emma Nelson Trail in honour of the couple's contributions to the region.

== Media ==
=== Newspapers ===
In 1914, plans were announced for the Terrace News Letter but its launch is unclear. During 1915–1917, the Terrace Dispatch newspaper was published.

Established in early 1920, the Terrace News existed at least until 1922. The interpretation of a 1934 mention of the Terrace News is uncertain.

By the early 1940s, the Omineca Herald at Hazelton had been renamed the Omineca Herald & Terrace Times. In 1949, the name changed to the Terrace Omineca Herald and the paper moved from New Hazelton. By the early 1960s, the title was the Terrace Herald. In 1984, the paper ceased publication.

The Terrace Review published 1985–1992. In 1988, the first issue of the Terrace Standard was printed.

The Terrace Daily Online existed from about 2007 to 2012.

Joining the mainstay Terrace Standard, the Skeena Reporter was launched in 2023.

=== Radio ===
- AM 590 – CFTK, adult contemporary
- FM 92.1 – CFNR-FM, First Nations community / classic rock
- FM 95.3 – CBTH-FM, CBC Radio One (repeats CFPR, Prince Rupert)
- FM 96.9 – CBUF-FM-3, Ici Radio-Canada Première (repeats CBUF-FM, Vancouver)
- FM 103.1 – CJFW-FM, country

=== Television ===
- Channel 3 – CFTK-TV, CTV 2 owned-and-operated station.

== Notable people ==
- William Anderson, (1950– ), religious leader, resident.
- Robin Austin, (1958– ), businessman and politician, resident.
- Ian Bagg, (1969– ), comedian, place of birth and resident.
- Rachel Blaney, (1974– ), politician, place of birth and resident.
- Ambur Braid, soprano, place of birth and resident.
- Caleb Brousseau, (1988– ), para-alpine skier, place of birth and resident.
- Roxanne Chow, (1979– ), soccer player, place of birth and resident.
- Paul Clark (1957– ), paralympic athlete, resident.
- Glen Cochrane, (1958– ), ice hockey player, resident.
- Eddie Evans, (1964– ), rugby union player, resident.
- Wade Flaherty, (1968– ), ice hockey player, place of birth and resident.
- Alayne Fleischmann, (197?– ), lawyer, place of birth and resident.
- Darril Fosty, (1968– ), author and journalist, place of birth.
- Helmut Giesbrecht, (1943–2020), politician, resident.
- Larry Guno, (1940–2005), lawyer and politician, resident and place of death.
- Jason Haldane, (1971– ), volleyball player, resident.
- Michelle Hendry, (1970– ), basketball player, place of birth and resident.
- Frank Howard, (1925–2011), politician, resident.
- Edward Tourtellotte Kenney, (1888–1974), politician, resident.
- David Kozier, (1978– ), ice hockey player, place of birth and resident.
- Dale Kushner, (1966– ), ice hockey player, place of birth and resident.
- Craig Levie, (1959– ), ice hockey player, resident.
- Dudley George Little, (1914–1972), politician, place of birth, resident, and place of death.
- Peter Mallon, (1929–2007), religious leader, resident.
- Bradley Mills, (1983– ), ice hockey player, place of birth.
- Brooks McNiven, (1981– ), baseball player, place of birth.
- Dave Parker, (1940– ), politician, resident.
- Crystal Pite, (1970– ), choreographer, place of birth.
- Rudy Poeschek, (1966– ), ice hockey player, resident.
- Aaron Pritchett, (1970– ), country music singer, place of birth.
- Joe Ruelle, (1978– ), author, place of birth.
- Jeff Sharples, (1967– ), ice hockey player, place of birth and resident.
- Brenda Silsbe, (1953– ), children's author, place of birth and resident.
- George Stanley, (1934– ), poet, resident.

== See also ==
- List of inland ferries in British Columbia
