= Emma Nelson (née Starr) =

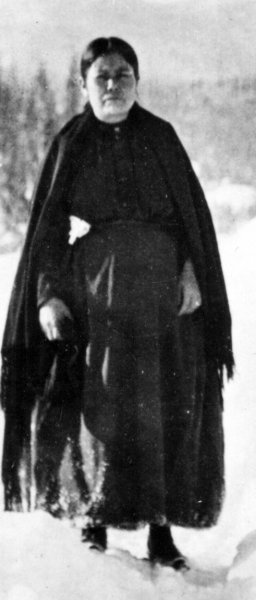
- Emma Nelson.
- Born: Emma Starr; 1854; Port Simpson, British Columbia
- Died: June 27, 1959; Terrace, British Columbia
- Spouse: Charles Nelson
- Children: 9

Emma Nelson (née Starr; 1854 – June 27, 1959) was a matriarch of the Gisbutwada (Killer Whale) house of the Kitsumkalum Tribe of the Tsimshian Nation, in British Columbia, Canada. She contributed significantly to the development of the Terrace, British Columbia area.

== Early life ==
Emma Nelson was born in Port Simpson (Lax Kw’alaams), British Columbia, in 1854. She belonged to the Gisbutwada clan and was a highly respected matriarch in her community.

== Family Life ==
Emma married Charles Nelson, Chief of the Ganhada (Raven) house of the Kitsumkalum Tribe, and together they raised nine children: Grace, Cecilia, Elizabeth, Josephine, Miriam, Gordon, Charlie Jr., Billy, and Dave. The Nelson family was among the few Indigenous families remaining in the area when European settlers began arriving in the early 20th century.

== Role in the Community ==
Emma Nelson worked in local salmon canneries during the fishing season, contributing to her family's livelihood. She was known for her efforts to gather and prepare food for the winter, including smoking and drying salmon, trapping, and berry picking.

After the death of her husband in 1930, Emma worked as a housekeeper in Terrace.

== Contributions and Legacy ==
Emma and her husband were instrumental in aiding early European settlers, providing food, hospitality, and local knowledge. They operated a general store in Kitsumkalum, helping to establish the Terrace area as a growing settlement. Despite their significant contributions, their roles have often been overlooked in traditional settler histories.

Emma lived to the age of 105, and died in Terrace on June 27, 1959.

=== Recognition ===
In May 2024, the Grand Trunk Pathway in Terrace was renamed the Xpilaxha – Charles and Emma Nelson Trail in honour of Emma and her husband's contributions to the community. The renaming was part of reconciliation efforts acknowledging Indigenous histories and their foundational roles in the region's development.
