= List of mines in British Columbia =

This is an incomplete list of mines in British Columbia, Canada and includes operating and closed mines, as well as proposed mines at an advanced stage of development (e.g. mining permits applied for). Mines that are in operation are in bold. Past producers which are under re-exploitation, re-development and/or re-promotion are in italics. Also in italics are major projects under development or subject to controversy.

| **Mine** | **Commodities** | **Coordinates** | **Associated town** | **Region/locality** | **Owner(s)** | **Dates** | **Comments** | References |
| Blue Hawk Mine | Au, Ag, Pb, Cu, Zn | 49°59′02″N 119°31′10″W | Westbank (West Kelowna) | Okanagan | | 1930s–1988 | | |
| Boss Mountain Mine | Mo, Cu, Zn, W, Ag, Bi | 52°05′48″N 120°54′27″W | Hendrix Lake (43 km SE of Horsefly) | Cariboo | NMC Resource Corp | 1917– | a.k.a. Hendrix Lake Mine, Timothy Mountain Mine | |
| Bralorne Mine | Au, Ag, Pb, Zn, Cu, W | 50°46′40″N 122°49′20″W | Bralorne | Bridge River Country | | | Founders were Frank and Delina Noel of the Lorne Mine, major developer was David Sloan. One of Canada's deepest mines. | |
| Britannia Mine | Cu, Zn, Pb, Ag, Au, Cd | 49°36′40″N 123°08′28″W | Britannia Beach | Howe Sound | Britannia Mining and Smelting Co. Ltd. (1904–1963) Anaconda (1963–1974) | 1904–1974 | Now the Britannia Mine Museum; often used as film set | |
| **Brucejack mine** | Au, Ag | 56°28′03″N 130°11′29″W | | Regional District of Kitimat-Stikine | Newmont | 2017– | | |
| Bullion Mine | Au | 52°37′38″N 121°38′21″W | Bullion (near Likely) | Cariboo | Placer Dome | 1859–1942 | a.k.a. the Bullion Pit and China Pit, one of the largest placer gold mines in the world | |
| Cariboo Amelia Mine | Au, Ag, Pb, Zn, Cu, Pyrophyllite, Silica | 49°6′57″N 119°11′02″W | Camp McKinney/Bridesville(N of Rock Creek | Okanagan Highland/Boundary Country | Consolidated Mining and Smelting Company | 1894–1962 | a.k.a. Cariboo Mine, Camp McKinney Mine, various; British Columbia's first dividend-paying gold mine | |
| Cariboo Gold Quartz Mine | Au, Ag, W, Bi, Pb, Zn | 53°05′23″N 121°33′41″W | Wells | Cariboo | | 1870s onwards, peak years 1833–1987 | | |
| Cassiar Mine | Asbestos, Chrysotile, Jade/Nephrite, Gemstones, Mg | 59°19′30″N 129°49′05″W | Cassiar | Cassiar Country | | 1950- | asbestos mining ended in 1989, now in development for magnesium | |
| Coal Mountain Mine | Coal | 49.510316°N 114.654458°W | Corbin | | Teck Resources | 1905–2018 | care and maintenance status | |
| Copper Mountain Mine | Cu, Au, Ag | 49°19′52″N 120°32′03″W | Copper Mountain & Allenby | Similkameen | | | a.k.a. Similco, amalgamated with Ingerbelle 1977–78 | |
| Craigmont Mine | Cu, Fe, Ag, Au | 50°12′27″N 120°55′34″W | Merritt | Nicola Country | | 1962–82 (copper), 1992–present (magnetite) | | |
| **Elkview coal mine** | Coal | 49.752273°N 114.877327°W | Sparwood | Elk Valley | Elk Valley Resources | | | |
| Estella Mine | Ag, Pb, Zn, Cd, Cu, Au | 49°46′10″N 115°36′19″W | Wasa | East Kootenay | United Estella Mines, Giant Mascot Mines, Giant Soo Mines | | | |
| **Fording River coal mine** | Coal | 50°13′15″N 114°51′34″W | Elkford | East Kootenay | Elk Valley Resources | | | |
| Galore Creek mine | Cu, Au, Ag | 57°07′35″N 131°27′14″W | | Regional District of Kitimat-Stikine | Teck Resources (50%) Newmont (50%) | | | |
| Giant Mascot Mine | Ni, Cu, Cr, Co, Au, Ag, Pt, Pd, Zn | 49°29′01″N 121°29′05″W | Hope | Southern Lillooet Ranges | | | a.k.a. Giant Nickel, Choate | |
| **Gibraltar Mine** | Cu | 52°31′47.31″N 122°17′11.53″W | McLeese Lake | Cariboo | Taseko Mines | 1972–1998; 2004– | | |
| Golden Cache Mine | Au | 50°38′30″N 122°04′55″W | Lillooet | Cayoosh Creek, Lillooet | | 1897–1901 | Caused a local gold rush and helped launch discoveries in the nearby Bridge River Valley; later seen to have been a speculatory scam based on salted prospects | |
| Granisle Mine | | 54°56′40″N 126°09′26″W | Granisle (nr Smithers) | Babine Lake/Omineca | Granby Mining and Smelting; Noranda | 1965–1982 | | |
| Hat Creek Coal Mine | coal (lignite) | 50°46′11″N 121°36′15″W | Pavilion–Upper Hat Creek | Lillooet Country | | 1893– | minor past producer; proposed for major coal-thermal power plant | |
| Hedley Mascot Mine | | | Hedley | Similkameen | Hedley Mascot Gold Mines | 1936–1949 | Today a mining museum | |
| Hidden Creek Mine | Copper, Gold, Silver, Cobalt, Zinc | 55°26′21″N 129°49′27″W | Anyox | Observatory Inlet | | 1914–1936 | a.k.a. Anyox Mine | |
| **Highland Valley Copper** | Cu, Mo, Ag, Au, Pb, Zn | 50°29′08″N 121°02′54″W | Logan Lake | NW Thompson Plateau | Teck Resources | 1962- | various mines: Bethlehem, Lornex, Highmont, Highland Valley | |
| Island Copper | Cu, Au, Ag, Mo, Re | 50°35′59″N 127°28′32″W | Port Hardy | Vancouver Island | Utah Mining | 1971–1995 | Produced 1.3 million tonnes Cu, 31,000 tonnes Mo, 10.9 million ounces Ag, and 1.03 million ounces Au | |
| Kemess Mine | Cu, Au, Mo, Ag (Zn, Pb) | 57°00′21″N 126°45′03″W | N/A | Thutade Lake (Omineca Mountains) | Northgate Resources | 1998–2011 | officially Kemess South is only producer; Kemess West and Rat 1 are Showings, Kemess North is a developed prospect | |
| Kitsault Mine | Mo, Ag, Pb, Zn, Cu, W | 55°25′19″N 129°25′10″W | Kitsault/Alice Arm (near Anyox) | Alice Arm, Observatory Inlet | Amax | 1967–1972/1982 | | |
| Lenora Mine | | | North Cowichan | Vancouver Island | Lenora, Mt. Sicker Copper Mining Co. | 1898–1902 | | |
| Minto Mine | Au, Cu, Ag, Pb, Zn | 50°53′55″N 122°45′05″W | Minto City | Bridge River Country | W.G. "Big Bill" Davidson | 1934–1940 | | |
| **Mount Polley mine** | Cu, Au, Ag | 52°30′48″N 121°35′47″W | Likely (nr. Williams Lake) | Cariboo Country | Imperial Metals Corp | 1997– | | |
| **New Afton mine** | Au, Cu | 50°40′34″N 120°20′27″W | Kamloops, BC | Thompson Valley | New Gold | 1960–1988, 2006–present | | |
| Nickel Plate Mine | | | Hedley | Similkameen | Marcus Daly, Hedley Gold Mining Co., Kelowna Exploration | 1900–1955 | | |
| Northair Mine | Au, Ag, Pb, Zn, Cu, Cd | 50°06′52″N 123°06′13″W | Whistler | Cheakamus Valley | | 1974–1982 | | |
| Phoenix Mine | Cu, Au, Ag, Pb, Fe, Talc | 49°05′27″N 118°35′58″W | Phoenix (Greenwood) | Boundary Country | Granby Mining and Smelting (among others) | | various mines at this location, see second ref | |
| Pioneer Mine | Au, Ag, Pb, Zn, Cu, Sb, W | 50°45′40″N 122°46′50″W | Pioneer Mine (Bralorne) | Bridge River Country | | 1897– | Later amalgamated with Bralorne Mine | |
| Premier Mine | Au, Ag, Pb, Zn, Cu, Cd | 56°03′06″N 130°00′51″W | Premier (nr. Stewart–Hyder AK) | Portland Canal | | 1918–1988 | | |
| Quinsam Coal Mine | Coal, Fireclay, Clay | 49°56′07″N 125°29′15″W | Campbell River | Mid Island | Hillsborough Resources | | Care and maintenance status | |
| **Quintette Mine** | Coal | 55°01′40″N 121°11′45″W | Tumbler Ridge | Hart Ranges (Northern Rockies) | Conuma Resources | 1982–2000; 2024– | | |
| Snowfield mine | Gold | | | | | | | |
| Sullivan Mine | Pb, Zn, Ag, Sn, Cu, Au, Fe, S, Sb, Cd, Bi, In, W | 49°42′27″N 116°00′19″W | Kimberley | East Kootenay | | | | |
| Surf Inlet Mine | Au, Cu, Ag, Mb | 53°05′29″N 128°52′56″W | Port Belmont a.k.a. Surf Inlet | Princess Royal Island | | 1917–1926; 1935–1942 | | |
| Tasu Mine | Fe, Cu, Ag, Au | 52°45′24″N 132°02′36″W | Tasu | Moresby Island | | 1908–1987 | Magnetite lode discovered by Haida people in the late 18th century | |
| Tulsequah Chief Mine | Zn, Cu, Pb, Ag, Au, Cd | 58°44′09″N 133°36′04″W | N/A | Taku River | Redfern Resources Ltd. | 1925– | | |
| Tyee Mine | | | North Cowichan | Vancouver Island | Tyee Copper Co. | 1900–1907 | | |

== See also ==
- List of ghost towns in British Columbia
