= Gold Trails and Ghost Towns =

Canadian historical documentary show

- Starring: Bill Barlee
- Country of origin: Canada
- No. of seasons: 10
- No. of episodes: 130

Production
- Running time: approx. 30 minutes

Original release
- Network: Syndication via CHBC-TV
- Release: 1986 – 1996

Gold Trails and Ghost Towns is a Canadian historical documentary show, created and produced by television station CHBC-TV in Kelowna, British Columbia for Canadian syndication and hosted by Mike Roberts with historian/storyteller Bill Barlee. The show was filmed in a studio which resembled an old trapper's cabin. Mike and Bill discussed prospectors and the history of British Columbia around 1900.

== List of episodes ==
Full list of episodes of Gold Trails and Ghost Towns.

Season 1

No. overall	No. in season	Title
1	1	"Sandon"
The discovery of silver in the "Silvery Slocan" gave rise to this boom town that boasted a population of over 2,000, 24 hotels, and two railroads.
2	2	"Dawson Creek"
A look at the Klondike Gold Rush in the Yukon Territory. The area around Dawson Creek yielded some of the finest gold in the world.
3	3	"Phoenix"
This town once boasted many fine hotels, as well as an indoor skating rink. Phoenix vanished after the residents simply walked away from it.
4	4	"Rossland"
Known as "The Golden City", Rossland grew to be the fourth largest city in B.C. One mine alone produced over $600 million worth of gold in today's terms.
5	5	"Treasure Story From Lardeau Country"
C.P.R. lineman Walter Clough is one of the key figures in the story of "The Lost Mortar & Pestle Mine" - a mine that yielded incredibly high-grade gold ore.
6	6	"Fairview"
Like many of the boom towns in the Old West, Fairview experienced devastating fires. During a trip to the townsite, many valuables were salvaged from the ruins.
7	7	"Yale"
Once the metropolis of the Fraser River, at least two hundred miners lost their lives along the banks of this river in the rush to make their fortune around Yale.
8	8	"Quesnel Forks"
Now a Cariboo ghost town, Quesnel Forks produced immense riches. Two Chinese miners made so much that they returned to their country as multimillionaires.
9	9	"Atlin"
An old dying miner whispered the whereabouts of his source of gold, causing gold fever and a rush to the Atlin district. The area still hides some treasure secrets.
10	10	"Border Country"
Empire builder James J. Hill figures prominently in the story of Border Country; a big man who when fire threatened his office saved his records by throwing his three hundred pound desk out a window.
11	11	"Granite City"
This area was rich in gold and platinum, but at 25 cents a pound, some miners buried their platinum until it was worth more. Some of these caches are being discovered today!
12	12	"Camp McKinney"
Two large gold bars were stolen during a hold up near Camp McKinney, and although the robber was found, the gold remains hidden.
13	13	"Gold Panning Trip"
Mike and Bill venture out to a creek in the Okanagan to try their luck at panning for gold....with some success!

Season 2

No. overall	No. in season	Title
14	1	"Greenwood"
The smallest incorporated city in Canada, Greenwood is also known as one of the last two great mining towns. It contained one of the largest smelters in the British Empire.
15	2	"Kaslo"
This town almost became a ghost town a mere sixteen weeks after its heyday, but it refused to die despite being hit by flood and fire.
16	3	"Cascade City"
Bill Barlee takes you home to Cascade City, a town where he spent his youth and tells of a large cache of silver.
17	4	"Cariboo Road"
The construction of the Cariboo Road is examined. This engineering marvel, which was carved from the walls of Fraser Canyon, provided miners with a safer route to their riches.
18	5	"Writing On Stone"
Bill and Mike leave B.C. for the Milk River Country of Southern Alberta. The badlands are the sources for several interesting stories.
19	6	"Chinese Miners"
The Chinese miners were famous for their skills as placer miners. They reworked areas left by white prospectors and didn't miss much gold.
20	7	"Slocan City"
Unbelievable riches in silver produced some of the classic towns of the era. "Cayuse Brown" and "The Yellow Kid" are just two of the characters Bill brings back to life, along with the story of the Golden Wedge Treasure.
21	8	"The Kettle Valley Railway"
A look at the history of the now extinct railway in B.C.'s southern interior and at the life of Andrew McCulloch, the man who masterminded the construction of the line and especially the building of the tunnels and huge trestles.
22	9	"Lost Golden Plate"
This story takes place in Western Ferry County and Eastern Okanogan County in Washington State. Ferry was known as the toughest town this side of Hell. The area was home to some amazing characters.
23	10	"Ainsworth"
It's known as the oldest mining town in the West Kootenay. The miners were attracted by the silver, lead and zinc ore that was so plentiful. Characters like "Let'er Go Gallagher" all make up the story of Ainsworth on Kootenay Lake.
24	11	"Wildhorse Creek"
Gold was discovered in this area on the western side of the Rockies in 1863. The find was substantial enough to spur the building of the Dewdney Trail. Trouble between the miners and local Indians brought Sam Steele and The Northwest Mounted Police into the region.
25	12	"Moyie"
The Sullivan Mine gets most of the attention as the richest silver mine in the world, but Moyie has many other fascinating stories. Among them how a Catholic priest was involved in a silver find in order to build a new church.
26	13	"Ymir"
Not much remains of this once wealthy mining town that had the reputation of being one of the toughest mining towns of the Pacific Slope, and it may hide some riches yet.

Season 3

No. overall	No. in season	Title
27	1	"Salmo"
The gold produced in the Salmo area was so rich that several mines thought nothing of allowing thousands of ounces of fine gold to be washed away in their operation's tailings.
28	2	"Stikine River Country"
In Northern B.C. hundreds of men passed through this area on their way to the Klondike. Through photographs we see one man's impression of this overland route to the Klondike.
29	3	"Northport"
A wealth of silver lay buried near Northport Washington, this once booming town that continued to grow although it suffered through several great fires.
30	4	"Eholt"
Started up in the 1890s, this town in the Boundary Country grew rapidly. During its heyday, trains ran 24 hours a day to get ore to the smelters in Grand Forks.
31	5	"Three Forks"
Three Forks appeared suddenly in the Silvery Slocan, and it vanished almost as suddenly. A story of how a hidden treasure was found is examined.
32	6	"Fritz Augustus Heinze"
This colourful character was known for working his mines with a top hat on. He made a fortune in Montana, but sensed greater opportunities north of the border and came to the Kootenays.
33	7	"K & S Railway"
James J. Hill, one of the C.P.R.'s biggest rivals, built this small but vital railway in some of the most treacherous country in the west.
34	8	"Rock Creek"
This creek near Beaverdell was the source of great riches. Half pound gold nuggets were known to have been found by some miners.
35	9	"Ashcroft"
This town was established along the Cariboo Road. It was known as the transportation capital of the interior, but when the railroad came through the town began to decline.
36	10	"Hedley"
The mine in Hedley was established on the treacherous terrain of Nickelplate Mountain. Footage of the mine, which produced by today's figures $750 million, is featured.
37	11	"Midway"
This town situated midway between the Rockies and the Pacific, saw its share of tough customers, rustlers, and gamblers. It was the sight of The Midway War, a clash of two rival Railroads.
38	12	"Keremeos"
The story of how three towns known as Keremeos became one and the unusual characters that frequented the place.
39	13	"Wells"
The story of how two men and their families went west to make their fortunes and came across one of the richest creeks in the Cariboo.

Season 4

No. overall	No. in season	Title
40	1	"Lightning Creek"
There were several rushes on Lightning Creek. Thousands of ounces of gold were mined in what was considered to be the richest placer creek in North America.
41	2	"Lytton"
Originally an Indian camp, this quiet place was changed forever in the 1850s when thousands of men searching for gold streamed into the area.
42	3	"Cedar Creek"
This creek boasted several "Nugget Patches"; incredibly rich diggings that produced hundreds of ounces of gold per day.
43	4	"Republic, Washington"
This area became legendary as a great gold producing town. Right from the start Republic began producing around 50 tons of gold per month.
44	5	"Bankers of B.C."
Alexander MacDonald had a dream to build up a banking empire, but a daring night-time robbery proved disastrous to his plans.
45	6	"Nelson"
Known as the Queen City of the Kootenays, Gold Trails examines the rich history of Nelson and the role it played in B.C.'s gold and silver rush!
46	7	"Bridge River Country"
The riches of the bridge river country are explored. Mines like the Pioneer and the Braelorne produced record amounts of gold.
47	8	"Bluebell Mine"
In the early 1800s the raw lead/zinc/silver ore was used to make musket balls, but it wasn't until the late 1800s that mining took off, and with it several violent incidents.
48	9	"Blakeburn"
Named for Blake Wilson and meat packing giant Pat Burns, this town was known for its coal. In the early 1900s thousands of tons of coal were mined until a tragic accident claimed the lives of many miners.
49	10	"Barkerville"
One of B.C.'s most famous gold towns, Barkerville produced literally tons of gold. Many of the fascinating locals in the 1800s left their mark on this historic town.
50	11	"Robert Thornton Lowery"
This colourful newspaperman was often described as five feet tall and always drunk. Lowry was responsible, however, for establishing ten papers in B.C. as he travelled through the Silvery Slocan.
51	12	"Trout Lake City"
From the 1800s to just after the turn of the century, there were a dozen towns in this area. Trout Lake City was the only survivor. The height of mining in this part of the Kootenays is examined
52	13	"Sir Matthew Baillie Begbie"
Born in England, Begbie came to B.C. and became known as the "Hanging Judge". His unusual approach to the law is discussed.

Season 5

No. overall	No. in season	Title
53	1	"Grand Forks"
Mike and Bill explore this thriving town in the Boundary country and its colorful residents like "Volcanic Brown".
54	2	"The Chinese in B.C."
They built the railways, they mined gold, and they formed the merchant class of many communities, making some of them very wealthy.
55	3	"The Yukon: 1896"
The first year of the Klondike Gold rush. Men like Skukum Jim and Tagish Charlie made their fortunes before the rest of the world knew about the strike.
56	4	"John Morgan Harris: The King of Sandon"
The entire town was virtually owned by Harris. His rise and fall parallelled the fate of the town in the silvery Slocan.
57	5	"Volcanic Brown"
The adventures of this colorful character is explored, including the search for a mysterious river that ran yellow with gold!
58	6	"Lillooet"
More a story of a region than a town, Gold Trails examines the role this community played in B.C.'s early development.
59	7	"Silverton"
A hard rock town where mines like the Mammoth and the Standard produced tons of silver ore and employed men like Big Pete Cafone, a giant among giants.
60	8	"Jefferson Randolph Smith"
Better known as Soapy Smith, the leader of a gang that took over a town and owned it and its people until the gang's untimely demise.
61	9	"Dewdney Trail"
This trail across the Southern Interior of B.C. was the freeway to some of the richest ore bodies in the province. Hedley, Phoenix, and Rossland sprang up along its route.
62	10	"New Hazelton & The Russian Gang"
The story of how a man of the cloth with a deadly aim put an end to a robbery spree that began in New Hazelton.
63	11	"Spanish Mound"
Did Spanish conquistadors make their way to the Interior of B.C. in their search for the legendary City of Gold? This question is examined on Gold Trails and Ghost Towns.
64	12	"Bill Miner"
"Hands Up!" It was a phrase that was coined by the legendary train robber who made life miserable for the C.P.R.
65	13	"The Hudson's Bay Company"
One of the world's oldest surviving companies; responsible for the exploration of most of Canada. Gold Trails looks at its famous posts in B.C.

Season 6

No. overall	No. in season	Title
66	1	"New Denver"
This Kootenay town became known as a jumping off spot for many a prospector in the Silvery Slocan.
67	2	"Spence's Bridge"
The story of how John Spence and his bridge became key in the development of way stations along the Cariboo Road.
68	3	"Bullion Pit"
The Bullion Pit is the largest hydraulic hole in the world, and still produces gold today. Its history and the story of John Beauregard Hobson are told.
69	4	"Quesnel"
Quesnel was the supply centre for the Cariboo gold mines. Kwong Lee profited by this business and became one of the Chinese merchant princes.
70	5	"Desert Country"
Fur traders, Indians, and miners travelled through this region, but it was the ranchers who stayed and left their mark.
71	6	"Revelstoke"
The story of Revelstoke and many of the big names that passed through it. David Thompson, the famous map-maker, Sam Steele, and more.
72	7	"Victoria"
The second largest port on the west coast of North America. A swashbuckling town that attracted some of the greatest names in B.C.'s history and how a tragedy at sea affected them all.
73	8	"Paddlewheelers"
The elegant ships that traveled through the West Kootenays including The Rossland, Moyie, Nasookin, Slocan, Bonnington and some special footage of the S.S. Minto on its final voyage.
74	9	"Coeur D'Alene"
The largest silver strike in North America was made here and the story of the jackass that found it.
75	10	"Nanaimo"
The coal town that made Robert Dunsmuir the richest man in British Columbia. Its triumphs and tragedies are explored.
76	11	"Cassiar"
There was a massive discovery of placer gold in this area which prompted the last great gold rush in Northern British Columbia.
77	12	"Princeton"
Formerly known as Vermillion Forks, gold plays a large role in this town's history. Bill recalls stories of gold at the end of main street and in the basement of the hospital.
78	13	"Beaverdell"
For nearly 100 years the silver mines of Beaverdell operated continuously, but while building a tennis court more riches were exposed.

Season 7

No. overall	No. in season	Title
79	1	"Squaw Creek"
By 1927 all the creeks in B.C. appeared to have been prospected...until spectacular coarse gold was found on this tributary to the Tatshenshini.
80	2	"K.V.R. East"
A look at some of the forgotten towns along this right-of-way of the old Kettle Valley Railway.
81	3	"Prince George"
The three Georges: Fort George, Prince George and South Fort George their histories. How they all eventually became the town now called Prince George.
82	4	"Fernie"
This town was known as one of the great mining towns of the Rockies. It was built on coal and beat the odds by rising from the ashes of a devastating fire.
83	5	"Frank, Alberta"
A mountain cascaded down on this town in the night burying it forever, but there were survivors. Their remarkable stories are recalled.
84	6	"Treasure Stories"
Bill examines the stories of a couple of great treasures. A rich run of gold on the Tulameen and a seam of silver in Northern B.C.
85	7	"Charles Marion Russel"
A profile of one of the artists who created magnificent images of the old west. Unlike other artists, Russel lived his life in the places he painted.
86	8	"Captain Billy Moore"
Captain Billy Moore was a superman of the old west who pursued every gold rush from California to the Klondike. He made three fortunes and lost most of them.
87	9	"Collectibles"
A look at the accessible treasure of the old west: gold scales, jewelry keepsakes, and other everyday objects.
88	10	"Kimberley"
A town that is almost 100 years old and still going strong with the fabulous Sullivan Mine.
89	11	"Cliff Dwellers"
The story of Mesa Verde and the strange disappearance of the cliff dwellers.
90	12	"Klondike Kate"
The story of the most famous woman in the Yukon, the Queen of Dawson - Klondike Kate.
91	13	"Merritt"
The high plateau of the Southern Interior of B.C. A look at the old Nicola town; the miners and cowboys who lived there.

Season 8

No. overall	No. in season	Title
92	1	"Collectibles 2"
A look at more of Bill Barlee's favourite items from his collection. Everything from native beadwork to toy soldiers and Hudson Bay items.
93	2	"Kwakiutl Nation"
The Kwakiutl Nation of Northwest Vancouver Island were known as artists and artisans of immense talent. A look at the builders and carvers of great totems, canoes, and long houses.
94	3	"Nome, Alaska"
In 1898 gold was discovered at Nome, Alaska, starting one of the more lawless gold rushes on the Pacific slope.
95	4	"Okanagan Sternwheelers"
For forty years, sternwheelers on Okanagan Lake flew the C.P.R. flag. A look at the vessels that moved cargo and passengers up and down Okanagan Lake.
96	5	"Decline of The Yukon"
Stories of the Klondike Kings and their fortunes. Millions were made and lost in short order.
97	6	"Dunsmuir Family"
The story of the Dunsmuirs; a family that went from rags to riches in three generations.
98	7	"Treasures and Lost Mine"
Two treasure stories are examined; one featuring a thousand gold sovereigns on one of the Gulf Islands and a lost streak of gold in the Slocan.
99	8	"Horsefly District"
Before Billy Barker it was Long Baptiste and Peter Dunleavy who first discovered gold in the area of the Cariboo called Horsefly.
100	9	"K.V.R. West"
The Kettle Valley Railway, Princeton sub-division, and the battle between James J. Hill of The Great Northern and Andrew McCulloch of The C.P.R.
101	10	"20 Photos of The West"
A look at twenty of Bill's favourite photographs from the old west and the stories behind them.
102	11	"B.C. Provincial Police"
The B.C. Provincial Police were created in 1858 to bring law and order to the Fraser River Gold Rush. They continued to serve until 1950.
103	12	"Gabriel Dumont"
Gabriel Dumont became known as the Napoleon of the prairies, though he never suffered the same fate as his friend Louis Riel.
104	13	"Deadman's Hill"
The Boundary Country produced large amounts of gold, but it also produced several lost mines. One of the best known is the treasure of Dead Man's Hill.

Season 9

No. overall	No. in season	Title
105	1	"Lost Gladstone Mine"
In 1909 Two prospectors return home with high grade gold ore samples found somewhere near the Christina Lake area.
106	2	"Francis Rattenbury"
Designer of some of B.C.’s most famous buildings, such as The Empress Hotel and B.C.’s Legislature Buildings.
107	3	"Photos Of The West"
Important images of the west as captured by some of the west's most famous photographers.
108	4	"Edouard Deville"
This federal official captured on film the progress of the C.P.R. as it was constructed through the Rockies to The Pacific Ocean.
109	5	"Anyox"
A mountain of gold, a mountain of silver, and a mountain of copper discovered on B.C.’s west coast at a place called Anyox.
110	6	"Collectibles `96"
A further look at items from Bill Barlee's collection. Some early Canadian artifacts are examined.
111	7	"Treasures On The Queen Charlottes"
The story of how quartz laced with gold was found along the beaches of The Queen Charlotte Islands.
112	8	"Sternwheelers of the Lower Fraser"
Scores of ships transported thousands of men on some of the toughest water on the continent.
113	9	"Leech River & Zeballos"
Two great gold finds on Vancouver Island are examined.
114	10	"Ghosts Along The Skeena"
A look at the ghost towns along the Skeena River.
115	11	"Lost Shuswap Mine"
Around the turn of the century two brothers find a gold deposit in the Salmon Arm area. The location of this mine still remains a mystery.
116	12	"North-West Mounted Police"
The story of the most respected police force in the world.
117	13	"Cumberland"
One of the premier coal mines on Vancouver Island, with a production of a half million tons per year.

Season 10

No. overall	No. in season	Title
118	1	"Joseph Patenaude"
This extraordinary man is known as the hero of Nelson. He way on his way to the Yukon, but took a side trip to the Kootenays, where he stayed.
119	2	"Collectibles ‘96/97"
More unique items from Bill Barlee's collection are examined. Several old west items, native pieces, and toys are looked at.
120	3	"Telegraph Creek"
Along the grand canyon of The Stikine, this little town will transport you back in time. Most of the original buildings still stand, but getting to Telegraph Creek is not for the faint of heart.
121	4	"Gamblers of Dawson"
Hear about many of the interesting characters from all parts of the globe that wound up in the gold capital of the world.
122	5	"Historic Photos ‘96/97"
A whole world of history is opened up as images of the west are examined, along with stories behind them.
123	6	"Smithers"
This spectacularly beautiful area, opened up by The Grand Trunk Railway, is rich in both history and treasure.
124	7	"South Okanagan Highlands"
This desert-like area, thought mostly for ranching and orcharding, has a little-known gold and silver belt.
125	8	"Fort St. James"
On the edge of the frontier, hear about the lives of individuals who passed through (and those who refused to pass through) the gates of this historic fort.
126	9	"Thompson River District"
Steeped in history, the Thompson river ran along many unique western towns.
127	10	"Golden & District"
In the shadow of the Rockies, the remote town of Cash decided to one-up the neighboring town of Silver City by becoming Golden.
128	11	"Three Lost Mines"
With new and updated information, Bill Barlee takes another look at three lost mine stories.
129	12	"Sandon Revisited"
Mike and Bill take another look at this fascinating town in the Silvery Slocan and the many characters not discussed before.
130	13	"Hope To North Bend"
A look at some of the interesting areas along the Fraser River; the river that led to the heartland of the nation.
