= Hastings Arm =

Fjord in British Columbia

- Location in British Columbia
- Location: British Columbia, Canada
- Coordinates: 55°30′14″N 129°46′04″W
- Type: Fjord
- Part of: Observatory Inlet

Hastings Arm is a fjord on the North Coast of British Columbia, which is the northwest arm of Observatory Inlet, one of the two main branchings of Portland Inlet, the other being the better-known Portland Canal, which forms part of the Canada–United States border. Hastings Arm is approximately 30 km (19 mi) in length from the divergence of Observatory Inlet near the former smelting town of Anyox, where a 25 km (16 mi) east arm, Alice Arm, branches off towards its head at the mouth of the Kitsault River. This divergence is approximately 50 km (31 mi) from the mouth of Observatory Inlet itself, near Nass Bay, which is the outer part of the estuary of the Nass River. At the head of Hastings Arm is the mouth of the Kshwan River, and the Nisga'a village-site of Kswan.

== Names ==
The name of the inlet in the Nisga'a language, which is indigenous to this area, is K'alli Kshwan, meaning "upriver water teeth" literally, and which is a reference to the tribe's founder Tseemsim cupping his hands to take a drink from the Kshwan River and finding it so cold it hurt his teeth.

The English name was conferred in 1869 by Captain Daniel Pender, after Rear Admiral the Hon. George Fowler Hastings, Commander in Chief of the Pacific Station 1866–69, whose flagship was the 20-gun HMS Zealous. Mount Fowler in the same area was also named for Admiral Hastings.
