= Nickel Plate Mine =

Gold mine on Nickel Plate Mountain, British Columbia

- Location in British Columbia
- Location: Hedley, British Columbia; 49°22′15″N 120°02′51″W
- Products: Gold
- Discovered: 1897
- Opened: 1900
- Closed: 1955

Nickel Plate Mine was a gold mine on Nickel Plate Mountain at Hedley in the Similkameen region of southern British Columbia.

== Discoveries ==
In 1894, Keremeos rancher, J.L. Coulthard, in partnership with Edgar Dewdney, staked three claims on what became known as Nickel Plate Mountain, but allowed the claims to lapse. In 1897, C. Johnston and Albert Jacobsen staked the Copper Cleft and the Mound claims for their sponsor, W.Y. Williams, manager of the Granby mines at Phoenix, and Peter Scott staked the Rollo for Robert R. Hedley, manager of the Hall Mines smelter at Nelson. Meanwhile, Constantine H. Arundel and Frances E.R. Woolaston, on finding surface traces of gold ore, staked the Bulldog, the Sunnyside, the Copperfield, the Iron Duke, the Horsefly, the Exchange Fraction, and the Nickel Plate. The subsequent gold rush led to registered claims covering almost the whole mountain by the end of 1898. The mountain base tent settlement on Twenty Mile (Hedley) Creek was called Hedley camp, after Robert R. Hedley.

== Construction ==
In 1899, Marcus Daly bought the Arundel and Woolaston claims for $60,000. Daly arranged for an initial 35-horse packtrain to carry supplies 40 kilometres (25 mi) across the mountain range from Fairview. Daly bought almost all the claims on the mountain, which he consolidated as Nickel Plate mine, incorporated as the Yale Mining Company (YMC). He established a small settlement on top of the mountain, but needed a more efficient means to bring in supplies, and transport out ore. By yearend 1900, aided by a $4,000 provincial grant, he had constructed a wagon road to Penticton, from where the Canadian Pacific Railway lake ferries linked to the CP rail network. After his death that November, his estate assumed control.

In 1903, the estate obtained a provincial charter for the Daly Reduction Company (DRC) to build and operate a concentrator and conveyance infrastructure, the DRC becoming the YMC's only asset. At the southeastern edge of Hedley Camp, the components of the DRC 200-ton daily capacity concentrator were powered by a 5-kilometre (3 mi) water flume, sourced from an upstream dam on the creek. Also built that year, the tramway delivered ore to the tipple, which gravity fed the concentrator. The two-stage tramway, which moved loaded ore gondolas from the mine, 0.5 kilometres (0.3 mi) vertically above, comprised a 3.0-kilometre (10,000 ft) narrow gauge track, reputed to have been the longest example in the world. Pelton impact water wheels powered the rock pulverizers, and air compressors that supplied a hoist and rock drills within the mine. A Cassel water wheel powered an alternating current generator that supplied the mine's electric locomotives.

== Production ==
After testing, production began in 1904. An air-operated hoist hauled two-ton cars from the mine to the surface, where they were emptied into 12-ton gondolas. Electric locomotives hauled the gondolas 2.4 kilometres (1.5 mi) to a 200-ton storage hopper, which supplied the tramway gondolas. The tramway was two-staged, because 2.5-centimetre (1 in)-diameter steel cable was unavailable in lengths greater than one mile. Following the contours of the terrain, the junction was dog legged, where cars were manually transferred between the two cable sets. At the centre of each section of single track was a short double-track passing configuration. Any supplies would be carried by the empty ascending gondolas. The dried final product was shipped in sacks to the Tacoma smelter. The Chuchuwayha Indian Reserve No. 2 was reduced to accommodate a tailings pond.

To access a separate part of its property, DRC approached Duncan Woods, owner of the small Mascot claim that year. However, Woods rejected the offer to tunnel through and mine his claim. When DRC had the properties resurveyed, the Mascot claim shrank to only 7 hectares (17 acres).

By summer 1907, the Daly mill was processing about 115 tons of ore daily. Armed guards escorted the gold output to Penticton for shipping by a circuitous route to the Everett smelter. When the Vancouver, Victoria and Eastern Railway (VV&E) rail head reached Keremeos that July, the journey was halved by exclusively using the Great Northern Railway (GN) network.

== New owners ==
In 1909, believing the best ore depleted, the Daly estate sold the operation for $760,000 to U.S. Steel subsidiary, the Exploration Syndicate of New York. Reorganized as the Hedley Gold Mining Co. (HGM), geological surveys located additional deposits. HGM electrified the mill, by redirecting most of the waterflow. The 1909 opening of the VV&E line through Hedley to Princeton provided a source for cheap coal. In 1911, the laying of track through the VV&E tunnel at Princeton created a short direct link to the Coalmont deposits.

HGM installed three new coal-fired boilers to power an electric generator for use during periods of inadequate waterflow. By 1912, production was over 200 tons daily. In 1917, the leaching process was abandoned. To address the unreliable water supply from the creek, a run-of-river hydroelectricity dam was opened on the Similkameen River in 1915. However, the river proved as problematic as the creek during winter freezing or chunks of ice battering and damaging the dam, leading to closures during 1920 and 1925. In 1920, HGM gained government permission to cut a 61-metre (200 ft) tunnel through the Mascot claim, without paying compensation. After years of marginal profitability, operations ceased in 1931.

In 1933, the South American Development Company subsidiary, Kelowna Exploration (KelEx), purchased the property. A $250,000 rehabilitation was undertaken before the 1935 reopening. A new hook up drew on the West Kootenay Power grid, and fed back surplus power from the dam, until winter damage destroyed the dam that year. Co-operation with HMG led to connected shafts allowing cross-ventilation and improved drainage. On completion in 1937, the current access road was shared with HMG, replacing the latter's previous deteriorated route. HMG abandoned operations in 1949, and KelEx in 1955.

== Revival ==
In 1971, the descendants of the two companies merged to become the Mascot Nickel Plate Mines, consolidating the entire mountain under one owner. In 1978, after no activity, the name became Mascot Gold Mines (MGM). In 1987, MGM demolished the buildings and facilities from the former small Nickel Plate settlement, and built a new processing plant. The next year, open-pit mining commenced. To finance the $10 million project and pursue interests farther afield, MGM amalgamated with several smaller mining companies to form the Corona Corporation, with subsequent restructuring. Nickel Plate production reached 4,000 tons daily, but by 1996, the mine was exhausted and operations ceased.

In 1987, Candorado Mines began reworking the former tailings for missed gold. This intermittent activity, which continued for nearly a decade, generated insufficient profit.

== Remnants ==
Just before the western outskirts of Hedley, a pullout with a green historic marker provides an eastward viewpoint of the straight scar of the former tramway route down the face of Nickel Plate Mountain. Not clearly visible are looping rolls of rusting cable high up on the mountain.

== Map ==
- "Hedley mine map". geography.ua.edu. 1910.
