= Mutual Legal Assistance in Criminal Matters Act (Canada) =

Canadian law

Parliament of Canada
- Long title: An Act to provide for the implementation of treaties for mutual legal assistance in criminal matters and to amend the Criminal Code, the Crown Liability Act and the Immigration Act
- Enacted by: Parliament of Canada
- Assented to: 28 July 1988
- Commenced: 1 October 1988

The Mutual Legal Assistance in Criminal Matters Act (French: Loi sur l’entraide juridique en matière criminelle) is an act of the Parliament of Canada and initially was passed by the 33rd Canadian Parliament in 1988. It deals with formalities about arrest warrants, production orders and orders of restraint, search and seizure, and forfeiture of assets between Canada and other countries. As of September 2019, well over 50 entries were found in the Canada Treaty Series.

== Cases ==
- United States v. Stumbo, was a US Federal Court case in the Eastern District of California in which the 23 year old defendant, Tyler Stumbo, was convicted of conspiracy to distribute anabolic steroids, which were at the time a Schedule III controlled substance in the US. Stumbo was convicted with the aid of a production order served at the British Columbia premises of his ISP, who provided him with encrypted email services.
- Krishnan Suthanthiran was the subject of Belgian prosecutorial attention in 2018, as it seemed to them he had engaged in "possible misuse of company assets, concealing assets in insolvency and money laundering" in his purchase and subsequent bankruptcy of a nuclear medicine business from a Belgian company named Nordion. In 2014, the Belgian authorities invoked the Act, in order to obtain search warrants. He contended that his cyclotron technology was the target of a legal fishing expedition. He was subject to search warrants in two different jurisdictions. A court in British Columbia endorsed his vision, while an Ontario court found in favour of the authorities. He appealed an adverse judgment in the Ontario Court of Appeal to the Supreme Court of Canada where his leave to appeal was denied in January 2018.
