= Camp McKinney, British Columbia =

Camp McKinney
- Location of Camp McKinney in British Columbia
- Coordinates: 49°06′59″N 119°11′04″W
- Country: Canada
- Province: British Columbia
- Region: Boundary Country
- Regional District: Kootenay Boundary

Camp McKinney is a ghost town in the Boundary Country region of British Columbia, Canada. It is located southeast of Mount Baldy, northeast of Osoyoos.

Several mines in the area led to the creation of Camp McKinney. The premier mine was called Cariboo-Amelia, usually referred to as the Cariboo.

Al McKinney and Fred Rice staked a claim in 1888 which eventually became the Caribou Mine. Founded in 1896, Camp McKinney was situated on the south-eastern slopes of towering Mount Baldy. By 1901, the population of McKinney was 250. Hotels such as St. Louis, Sailor, Camp McKinney, McBoyle & West's, Cariboo and Miner's exchange competed for the miners' trade. The stagecoach of Hall line from Fairview and from the east came Meyerhoff's stage from Midway. The business section of town consisted of five saloons, three general stores, a drug store, a real estate office, butcher shop, a school and a church. "In 1901, 16,862 tons of ore yielded 9,439 ounces of gold bullion, and 428 tons of concentrates." "Up until October, 1900, dividends of $478,087 were paid, and in 1902, $496,837." However, gold mining declined in the area, the Cariboo Mine closed in December 1903 and Camp McKinney became a ghost town.

Several unsuccessful attempts were made to revive the camp from 1907. Today, all that is left is a cemetery and a few abandoned workings.

== Lost gold bars ==
On August 18, 1896, George B. McAulay of Spokane, Washington, one of the major shareholders in the Cariboo mine, left Camp McKinney for Midway. McAulay had three gold bricks valued at more than $10,000. He was robbed half an hour later on his way to Midway. Cariboo Mining Company posted a $3,000 reward for information leading to recovery of the gold bars. The bars were never recovered. It is believed the bars were hidden or buried somewhere in the area, close by Camp McKinney still waiting to be discovered.

== Television ==
Camp McKinney was featured on the historical television series Gold Trails and Ghost Towns, season 1, episode 12.
