= Phoenix Mine =

Mine in British Columbia, Canada

- Location in British Columbia Phoenix Mine (Canada)
- Location: Phoenix, British Columbia, Canada; 49°05′55.77″N 118°35′51.92″W
- Products: Copper
- Discovered: 1891
- Opened: 1896
- Active: 1896 - 1919; 1959 - 1976
- Closed: 1976
- Company: Granby Consolidated Mining, Smelting and Power Company, Limited
- Acquired: 1896

Phoenix Mine was an open pit and underground mining operation in city of Phoenix in the Boundary Country region of British Columbia, Canada that operated in the early and mid 20th century, run by the Granby Consolidated Mining, Smelting and Power Company. It was discovered in 1891, but was a lower grade copper deposit than the Rossland and Slocan deposits. The low grade and the nearest railroad being 75 miles (121 km) resulted in the Phoenix (and other new deposits) receiving less attention.

== Discovery & development ==
The first claims in the Phoenix area were staked by Henry White and Matthew Hatter (of the Old Ironsides claim) on July 15, 1891, they were granted in 1896. In 1896, J.F.C. Miner, a rubber footwear manufacturer from Granby, Quebec, mining promoter J.P. Graves of Knob Hill Mining Company and A.L. Little of Old Ironsides formed the Miner-Graves Syndicate. In 1899, they incorporated The Granby Consolidated Mining and Smelting Company, Limited and, in 1901, consolidated as Granby Consolidated Mining, Smelting and Power Company, Limited.

In spite of the low grade of the ore from the Phoenix deposit, it had the advantage of being self-fluxing (only requiring coke to be added for smelting), which resulted in a cheaper processing cost for a mining company interested in operating it. In 1896 development of the deposit began and in 1900 the Granby Smelter Company constructed a 700-ton-per-day smelter in Grand Forks, British Columbia, which would be the largest non-ferrous smelter in the British Empire, and the second largest in the world.

== Production ==
=== 1896–1919 ===
Granby operated the Phoenix mine, which comprised both an underground mine and open pit mine. The underground operation used the square set mining method, but by 1901 had converted to an open stope and pillar method with considerable cost savings. The operation maintained a completely unsupported "show stope" with dimensions of 80 feet (24 m) high, 105 feet (32 m) wide, and 400 feet (122 m) long. In 1903 the mine operated three small steam shovels to work in the surface operations producing half of the mine's production, making this one of the earliest attempts at open-pit mining in the British Columbia. Ore was transported to the smelter via the Canadian Pacific Railway, which had built a line to the mining operation by the time the smelter was completed in 1900.

=== 1959–1976 ===
In 1956 Granby re-evaluated the property in light of recent success in their other open-pit operations in the province. There was an estimated 1,300,000 tons of ore readily available; a 600-ton-per-day concentrator was constructed and production began in 1959. The following year, when more ore per day became available, the concentrator was upgraded to handle 900 tons per day, 1,900 tons per day in 1964 and 2,750 in 1972 The Phoenix mine closed again in 1976.

== See also ==
- List of mines in British Columbia
