= George Fowler Hastings =

Officer of the British Royal Navy

Vice-Admiral George Fowler Hastings CB
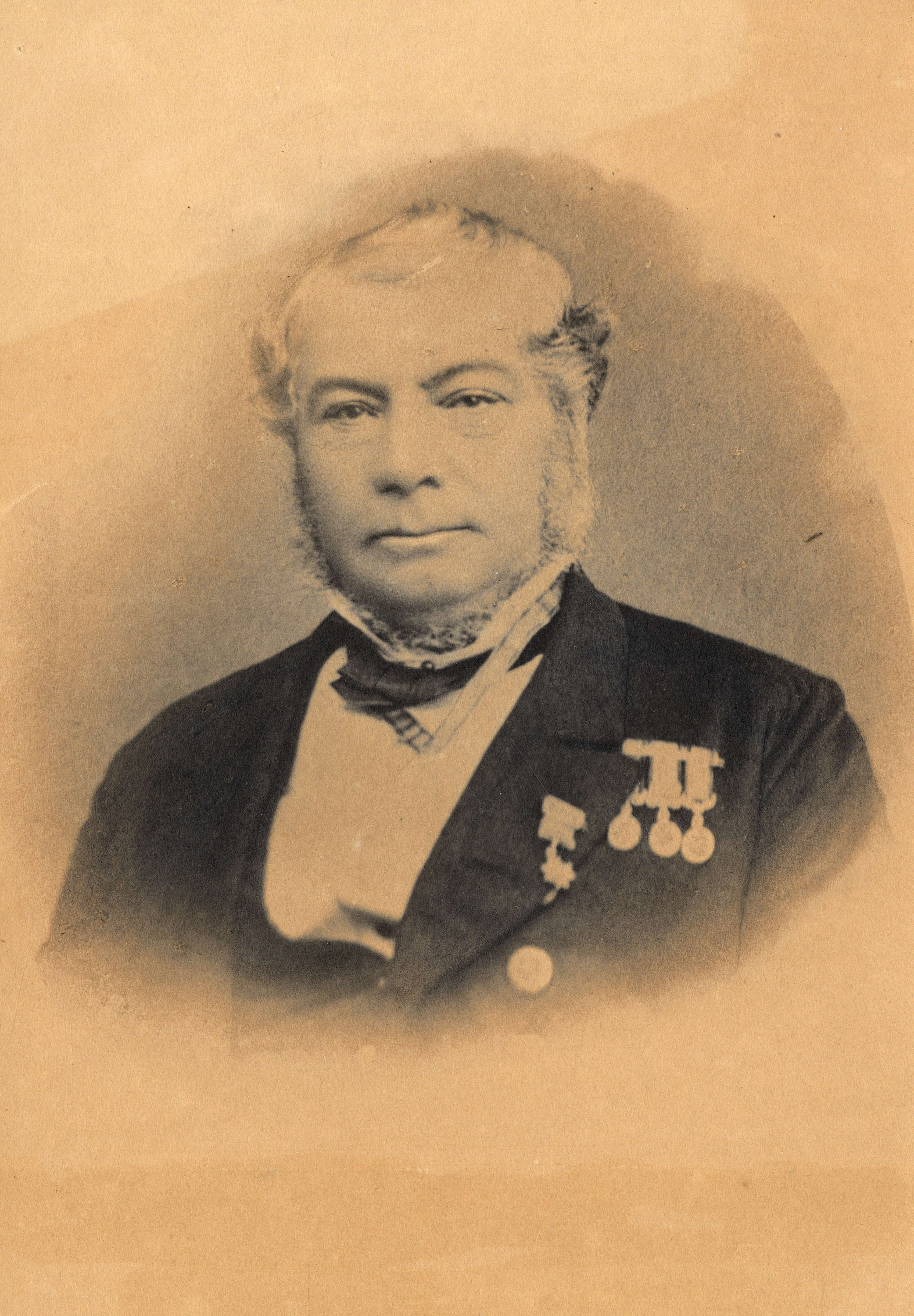
- Photograph of Vice-Admiral George Fowler Hastings,(c. 1875)
- Born: 28 November 1814; Enniskillen, County Fermanagh, Northern Ireland
- Died: 21 March 1876 (aged 61); 41 Stanhope Gardens, South Kensington, London, England, United Kingdom
- Military career
- Allegiance: United Kingdom
- Branch: Royal Navy
- Service years: 1824 – 1876
- Rank: Vice-Admiral
- Commands: Pacific Station; Nore Command
- Conflicts: First Opium War; Crimean War
- Awards: Companion of the Order of the Bath

Vice-Admiral George Fowler Hastings CB (28 November 1814 – 21 March 1876) was an officer of the Royal Navy, who saw service during the First Opium War and the Crimean War. In a naval career spanning over 50 years, Hastings saw service across the British Empire, and rose to the rank of vice-admiral. His service as commander in chief on the Pacific Station of the Royal Navy at Esquimalt on the British Columbia Coast of what is now Canada is today commemorated in the names of several locations and geographic features.

== Family and early life ==
Hastings was born on 28 November 1814, the second son of Hans Hastings, 12th Earl of Huntingdon, and his first wife Frances. His father had a naval career, and George followed him into the navy in either August or September 1824.^{[a]} After several years service as a midshipman Hastings was rated as mate on 5 September 1832, and promoted to lieutenant on 7 January 1833, followed by an appointment to the navy's gunnery training ship at Portsmouth, HMS Excellent. This was followed in May 1834 with a posting to the Mediterranean, initially aboard the 74-gun third rate HMS Revenge, followed by his transfer in September 1837 to the wooden paddle sloop HMS Rhadamanthus.

== Cricket ==
Hastings played a single first-class match for Hampshire in 1843 against Nottinghamshire. In the match, Hastings scored 5 runs in Hampshire's first innings before being bowled out. In Hampshire's second innings he was dismissed for a duck.

== Command ==
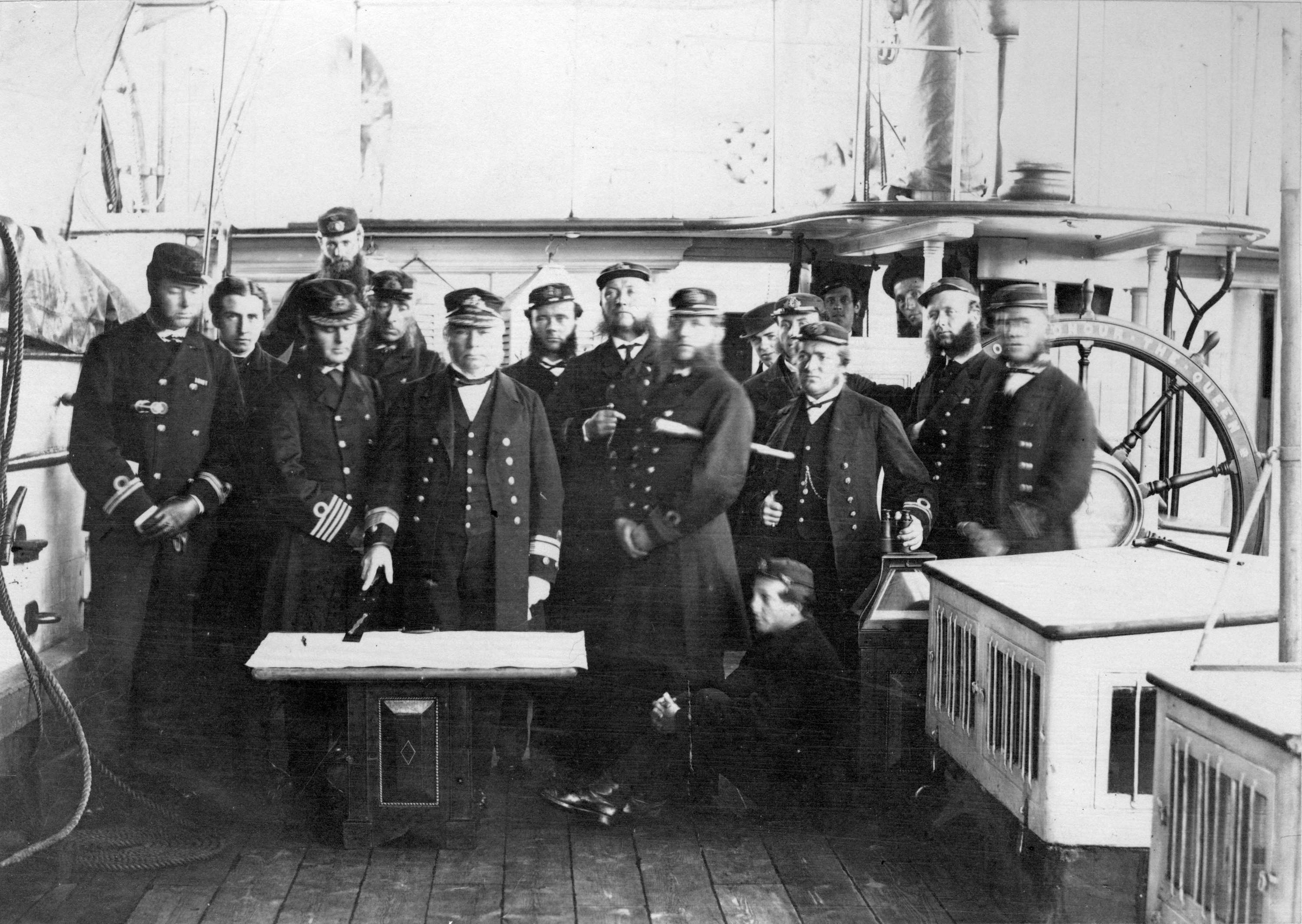
Admiral Hastings, centre, with officers of HMS Sparrowhawk, on the Pacific Station

Hastings was promoted to commander on 30 June 1838, and was appointed to the Coastguard in January 1839. He was appointed to the 16-gun brig-sloop HMS Harlequin in August 1841 and sent to the China Station in time to take part in the last actions of the First Opium War then being fought. He remained in eastern waters after the end of the war, countering pirate operations on the coast of Sumatra. He was involved in the attack by the boats from Harlequin on the pirate enclaves of Quallah Batto and 'Murdoo', and his good service in these operations led to his promotion to captain, which came when he paid off the Harlequin on 31 January 1845.

Hastings was appointed to his next command, the steam paddle frigate HMS Cyclops, in September 1848. He commanded her on the west coast of Africa until February 1851. The crew of Cyclops are recorded as receiving bounties for the capture of the vessels Bom Successo on 25 December 1848, Esperanca on 10 May 1849, Sophia on 11 August 1849 and Apollo on 29 October 1949 (the last two in consort with HMS Rattler) Pilot on 10 January 1850, Ventura on 27 January 1850 (both with HMS Pluto), Sociedade on 17 June 1850, and an unnamed "slave brigantine" on 20 November 1850; as the chief duty of the West Africa Squadron was the suppression of the slave trade, presumably those ship were all slave ships. Hastings received £67 15 shillings and 11½ pence as his share from the Bom Successo, £398 18 shillings for Esperanca, £91 4 shillings 5¼ pence for Sophia and £106 19 shillings 10 pence for Apollo, £128 6 shillings 10 pence for Pilot, £250 11 shillings 11 pence for Ventura, £85 16 shillings 10 pence for Sociedade, and £333 2 shillings 10 pence for the unnamed brigantine; a total of nearly £1500, worth around £180,000 today.

An appointment to the steam frigate HMS Curacoa followed, and Hastings served aboard her for operations in the Mediterranean and Black Sea during the Crimean War. While serving in the Crimea Hastings distinguished himself at the Battle of Eupatoria in February 1855, and was Mentioned in Despatches in the London Gazette of 8 March 1855, and honourably mentioned by Omar Pasha. He was duly appointed Companion of the Order of the Bath (CB) on 2 January 1857, and was also awarded the third class of the Medjidie, an award he was authorised to accept on 3 April 1858.

He remained aboard Curacoa until May 1857. He briefly commanded HMS Maeander at Weymouth (a guardship for the coast guard service) before being appointed (November 1857) commander of HMS Blenheim the Portsmouth guardship. He became superintendent of Haslar Hospital and the Royal Clarence victualling yard in January 1858, holding the post until his promotion to rear-admiral on 27 April 1863. His next assignment was in November 1866, when he became commander-in-chief in the Pacific, with the broadside ironclad HMS Zealous as his flagship. He received another promotion on 10 September 1869 when he was raised to vice-admiral, and returned to Britain in November that year. His final position came with his appointment to be Commander-in-Chief, The Nore in February 1873. He retained the post for the usual three years, stepping down on 14 February 1876. He died shortly afterwards, on 21 March 1876 at his home at 41 Stanhope Gardens, South Kensington, London.

== Family and legacy ==
Hastings married Mathilde Alice at the British consulate at Calais on 14 September 1864. A second ceremony was held the following day at the bride's home town of Saint-Omer. The marriage produced three sons and a daughter, with Mathilde outliving George and dying in 1916.

Hastings's period as commander of the Pacific station during a period of extensive mapping and exploration around the region led to his name being commemorated, particularly in numerous geographic features. Hastings Street, a main east–west corridor in Vancouver is named for him, and other placenames in the city are derived from it, such as Hastings Park and the adjacent neighbourhood of Hastings-Sunrise. The fjord Hastings Arm on the North Coast of British Columbia was named after him, as was the nearby Mount Fowler.

Their daughter, Frances Alice Hastings (26 July 1870 – 3 February 1945), married Gordon George William Henry (1868–1947), on 4 November 1895.

== Notes ==
a. The Oxford Dictionary of National Biography describes him as entering the navy in September 1824, while parliamentary papers from 1863 give an entry date of 14 August 1824. The parts of his service record preserved by The National Archives do not show a date for his entry.
b. The Oxford Dictionary of National Biography claims that Hastings was in command from August 1852. J. J. Colledge's Ships of the Royal Navy and Lyon and Winfield's The Sail and Steam Navy List record that Curacoa was not launched until 13 April 1854. His service record notes his appointment to the ship on 11 August 1854.

== See also ==
- O'Byrne, William Richard (1849). A Naval Biographical Dictionary . John Murray – via Wikisource.

Military offices
Preceded by Sir Henry Denham	Commander-in-Chief, Pacific Station; 1866–1869	Succeeded by Sir Arthur Farquhar
Preceded by Sir Charles Elliot	Commander-in-Chief, The Nore; 1873–1876	Succeeded by Sir Henry Chads
