= Hedley Mascot Mine =

Former gold mine at Hedley, British Columbia, Canada

- Location in British Columbia
- Location: Hedley, British Columbia; 49°22′15″N 120°02′51″W
- Products: Gold
- Discovered: 1899
- Opened: 1936
- Closed: 1949
- Website: mascotmine.com

Mascot Mine of Hedley was a gold mine on Nickel Plate Mountain at Hedley in the Similkameen region of southern British Columbia, Canada.

== Discovery ==
In 1899, aware that prospectors rarely staked claims on near vertical terrain, Duncan Woods studied a map of what became known as Nickel Plate Mountain. Noting an almost 16-hectare (40-acre) sliver on the edge of a precipice, which plunged 0.9 kilometres (2,900 ft) down to Twenty Mile (Hedley) Creek, he staked his claim.

== Dormant ==
Choosing the Mascot as a name, but unable to secure development funds, his only activity was paying the fee each year to maintain title. To access a separate part of its property, the Daly Reduction Company (DRC) approached Woods in 1904. However, he rejected the offer to tunnel through and mine his claim. When DRC had the properties resurveyed, the Mascot claim shrank to only 7 hectares (17 acres). In 1909, the Hedley Gold Mining Co. (HGM) bought the DRC operation. In 1920, HGM gained government permission to cut a 61-metre (200 ft) tunnel through the Mascot claim, without paying compensation.

== Construction ==
After HGM closed in 1931, Woods sold his claim to Hedley Mascot Gold Mines (HMG) (owned by BC businessmen) for $150,000. The deal largely comprised receiving company stock, a director's position, and a company-supplied suite at the Three Gables Hotel in Penticton.

In 1933, Democratic presidential candidate Franklin D. Roosevelt ran on a promise to increase the gold price from $20 to $35 an ounce. Consequently, HMG floated a $3 million share subscription to develop the Mascot. Although HMG acquired 31 nearby claims, suitable surface area for building infrastructure was limited. Using the 1920 HGM tunnel, HMG crews drilled exploratory holes.

The company built a concentrator by the creek upstream from Hedley, connected to West Kootenay Power for electricity. An aerial tramway was installed to carry three-ton buckets of ore from the mine, 0.5 kilometres (0.3 mi) vertically above, along a 1.6-kilometre (1 mi) cable. A road up to the mine was built from farther up the creek valley.

== Operation ==
In 1936, production commenced. Battery-powered locomotives hauled ore cars along a 46-centimetre (18 in) narrow gauge track from the mine to the storage hoppers. Loaded from the hoppers, the descending tramway buckets powered the cable. The empty ascending tramway buckets carried supplies, and employees at the shift change. The concentrate was trucked to the Vancouver, Victoria and Eastern Railway (VV&E) yards at Hedley, from where the Great Northern Railway (GN) network transported the product to the Tacoma smelter.

In 1933, the South American Development Company subsidiary, Kelowna Exploration (KelEx), purchased the neighbouring HGM. Co-operation with the new owners led to connected shafts allowing cross-ventilation and improved drainage. On completion in 1937, KelEx shared the current access road with HMG, replacing the latter's previous deteriorated route.

In 1941, capacity increased to 200 tons daily. The company also milled ores from the neighbouring Canty and Good Hope mines. HMG abandoned operations in 1949, and KelEx in 1955. Production revived as a merged operation during 1988–1996.

== Remnants ==
By the 1990s, the insurers for the long abandoned HMG complex were concerned that site visitors could lodge liability claims for personal injuries. A coalition demanding preservation blocked plans to burn down the buildings. In 1995, the Upper Similkameen Indian Band re-roofed several buildings to lessen deterioration. The province bought the site for $740,000, stabilized and rehabilitated structures over the following years, and in 2003 provided $300,000 to retrofit the site for tourism.

The tightly packed structures comprise the former dormitories, a cookhouse and machine sheds. In 2004, the site opened for tours, but closed in 2017. A provincial grant of $800,000 to the band in 2021 will enable a 2023 reopening. Projects include repairs and stabilization, a new parking lot, an improved website and enhanced trails and stairs.
