= Kitsault =

Unincorporated settlement and private town in British Columbia

Kitsault Chandra Krishnan Kitsault
- Kitsault
- Location of Kitsault Kitsault (Canada)
- Coordinates: 55°28′00″N 129°29′00″W
- Country: Canada
- Province: British Columbia
- Regional district: Kitimat–Stikine

Population (2008)
  - Total: 1
- Area codes: 250, 778

Kitsault also known as Chandra Krishnan Kitsault is an unincorporated settlement and private town on the North Coast of British Columbia, Canada, at the head of Alice Arm, Observatory Inlet and at the mouth of the Kitsault River. The locality of Alice Arm and the Nisga'a community of Gits'oohl (formerly Gitzault Indian Reserve No. 24) are in the immediate vicinity. "Kitsault" is an adaptation of Gits'oohl, which means "a ways in behind".

== History ==
The later town of Kitsault was established in 1979 as the home community to a molybdenum mine, run by the Phelps Dodge corporation of the United States. The community was designed for 1,200 residents and included a shopping mall, referred to as the Kitsault Mall by The Tyee, restaurant, swimming pool and bowling alley. In 1982, however, prices for molybdenum crashed and the entire community was evacuated after just 18 months of residence.

In 2004, the ghost town was purchased by Indian-Canadian businessman Krishnan Suthanthiran for $5.7 million; he has spent $2 million maintaining the town. He renamed the community from "Kitsault" to "Chandra Krishnan Kitsault", after his deceased mother. In the end, he would have spent over $20 million more to fully update the town. He has also since closed the town to the public.

In an effort to revitalize the ghost town, Kitsault has been proposed as a location for a liquefied natural gas (LNG) terminal site for the export of natural gas from northwestern British Columbia. LNG pipeline routing to Kitsault has been proposed.

== See also ==
- Anyox
