= Brucejack mine =

Mine in British Columbia, Canada

- Location in Canada
- Location: Canada, British Columbia; 56°28′03″N 130°11′29″W
- Products: Gold; Silver
- Production: 347,743 ounces gold; 472,163 ounces silver
- Financial year: 2020
- Discovered: 1935
- Opened: 2017
- Company: Newmont
- Website: Brucejack

The Brucejack mine is a Canadian gold and silver mine located 65 kilometres (40 mi) north of Stewart, British Columbia. The mine is underground and is owned and operated by Newmont. In 2020, the mine produced an output of 347,743 ounces of gold and 472,163 ounces of silver.

As of January 2020, the proven and probable reserves of the mine were 4.2 million ounces of gold and 30.1 million ounces of silver.

== History ==
On July 30, 2015, the BC provincial government approved Pretium Resources' Brucejack mine project. With the approval of the project, construction began on September 5. The Brucejack mine achieved its first gold pour in June 2017. The first commercial production began on July 1, 2017.

The mine has changed ownership throughout its life due to corporate acquisitions. The original owner, Pretium Resources, was acquired by Newcrest on March 9, 2022. In 2023, an American mining company, Newmont, acquired Newcrest, and gained the Brucejack mine.

== Geology and mining method ==
The Brucejack mine deposit is an electrum intermediate-sulphidation epithermal deposit. It is located in the Stikine terrane, in the Intermontane Belt. The Brucejack mine is an underground mine that utilizes a long hole stoping method to extract ore from the orebody.

== See also ==
- List of gold mines in Canada
- List of mines in British Columbia
- Mount Polley mine
- Geology of British Columbia
