= Alice Arm, British Columbia =

Locality in British Columbia

Alice Arm
- Location of Alice Arm Alice Arm (Canada)
- Coordinates: 55°28′58″N 129°29′19″W
- Country: Canada
- Province: British Columbia
- Area codes: 250, 778, 236

Alice Arm is a locality, former post office, and steamer landing on the North Coast of British Columbia, Canada, located on the east side of Observatory Inlet at the mouth of the Kitsault River. There are still a number of houses standing and several seasonal homeowners who still access their houses every year. It was the location of a short rail line that accessed the mine.

== Name origin ==
See Alice Arm for the origin of the name.

== See also ==
- Anyox
- Kitsault
