= Observatory Inlet =

Inlet in the North Coast region of British Columbia, Canada

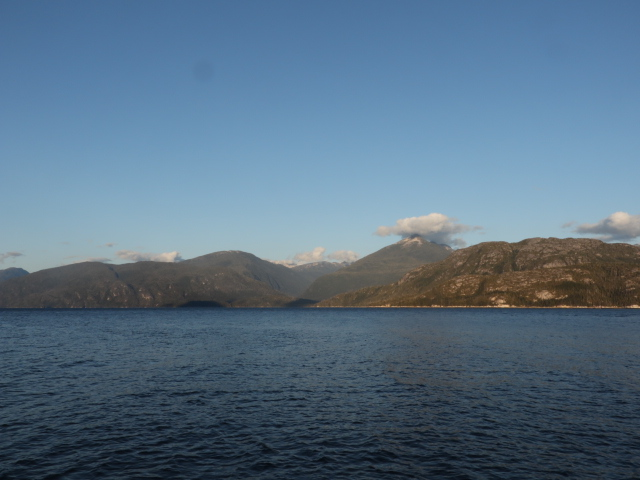
- Observatory Inlet as seen from Salmon Cove

- Location in British Columbia
- Location: British Columbia, Canada
- Coordinates: 55°17′25″N 129°46′59″W
- Type: Fjord
- Part of: Portland Inlet
- Surface area: 224 square kilometres (86.5 sq mi)
- Max. depth: 500 metres (1,600 ft)

Observatory Inlet is an inlet on the North Coast of British Columbia. It is a northward extension of Portland Inlet, other branches of which include the Portland Canal. The entrance of Observatory Inlet, from Portland Inlet, lies between Ramsden Point and Nass Point. Ramsden Point also marks, to the west, the entrance of Portland Canal.

The Nisga'a assert that the inlet constitutes part of their ancient territory.

== Features ==
Ksi xts’at’kw/Stagoo Conservancy
The 11,647 ha (28,780 acres) conservancy was designated in Spring 2006, access to the conservancy is primarily by boat with a good anchorage in Stagoo Inlet. The Nisga’a have historically collected food and materials from Ksi Xts’at’kw/Stagoo, the conservancy is also part of the traditional territory of the Metlakatla.

Observatory Sill
A 60 m (200 ft) aquatic sill divides Observatory Inlet from Portland Inlet, tidal flows over the sill are known to be energetic and capable of producing internal waves, hydraulic jumps and other internal disturbances.

== Etymology ==
Observatory Inlet was named by George Vancouver in 1793, because he set up his observatory on the shore of the inlet, at Salmon Cove, in order to calibrate his chronometers. His two vessels, HMS Discovery and HMS Chatham, stayed in Salmon Cove from July 23 to August 17, 1793. During this time a boat surveying expedition under Vancouver himself explored Behm Canal.

Vancouver also named three headlands at the entrance of Observatory Inlet: Maskelyne Point, for Nevil Maskelyne, the Astronomer Royal, Wales Point, for William Wales, the mathematical master who sailed with James Cook, and Ramsden Point, after the famed mathematical instrument-maker Jesse Ramsden.

== Geography ==
Observatory Inlet has two main arms, the northwest and longer one being named Hastings Arm, fed by the Kshwan River, and Alice Arm, an east arm, fed by the Kitsault River. Hastings Arm is approximately 30 km (19 mi) in length, and runs on a nearly true north–south axis, Alice Arm is approximately 25 km (16 mi) in length and bends sharply, running on a roughly northeast–southwest axis.

From their merger to the mouth of Observatory Inlet is approximately 50 km (31 mi) in length, running south-southwest to its merger with the Portland Canal just southwest of Nass Bay, which is an arm of Observatory Inlet and the saltwater outer estuary of the Nass River.

Of many islands in the inlet, Granby Peninsula and Brooke Island are located at the intersection of the Hastings and Alice Arms. Granby Peninsula and Granby Bay are named for Granby Consolidated Mining, Smelting and Power Company, which built and operated the mining town of Anyox, located on Granby Bay.

== Settlements ==
At the aperture of Nass Bay is the community of Arrandale on its southern point, with the community of Ging̱olx (Kincolith) located on its northern shore just inside the bay at the mouth of the Kincolith River. Also entering the Nass estuary just to its east is the Iknouk River.

The smelter ghost town of Anyox is located on the west side of the inlet at Granby Bay, which marks the beginning of Hastings Arm.

The locality of Alice Arm, which is a former steamer landing and on the west bank of the mouth of the Kitsault River, is located at the head of the inlet's Alice Arm projection.

The former mining town of Kitsault is located 2.5 km (1.6 mi) due south of Alice Arm, on the far side of the inlet's shoreline. With no rail nor road connection to the rest of British Columbia, these mining towns relied on shipping through Observatory Inlet.

Adjacent to the community of Alice Arm, but on the east side of the Kitsault River, is the Nisga'a village of Gits'oolh (formerly Gitzault Indian Reserve No. 24).

== See also ==
- Fjords of Canada
