= Hedley, British Columbia =

Unincorporated community in British Columbia, Canada

Hedley
- Location of Hedley in British Columbia
- Coordinates: 49°12′46″N 120°02′36″W
- Country: Canada
- Province: British Columbia
- Region: Similkameen Country
- Regional District: Okanagan-Similkameen

Area
  - Total: 0.57 km^{2} (0.22 sq mi)

Population (2016)
  - Total: 242
  - Density: 422.4/km^{2} (1,094/sq mi)
- Area codes: 250, 778, 236, & 672
- Highway: Highway 3

Hedley is an unincorporated community near the mouth of Hedley Creek in the Similkameen region of southern British Columbia, Canada. The former mining town, on BC Highway 3, is by road about 74 kilometres (46 mi) southwest of Penticton and 38 kilometres (24 mi) southeast of Princeton.

== First Nations ==
The Chuchuwayha Indian Reserve #2 of the Upper Similkameen Indian Band borders Hedley, largely to the northwest. Peter O'Reilly laid out the boundaries in 1870, which were amended by re-adjustments in 1886. To the southeast, the Ashnola Reserve of the Sukwnaqinx extends almost to Keremeos. The Snaza'ist Discovery Centre houses the interpretive centre for the Mascot mine tours and First Nations culture.

== Etymology ==
The name of the town came from Hedley Camp, which was ascribed to the original tent settlement that the prospectors on Nickel Plate Mountain used as a base, but more broadly applied to the local mining area. Robert R. Hedley, manager of the Hall Mines smelter at Nelson, was the initial owner of the Rollo claim on the mountain.

== Mining on Nickel Plate Mountain ==
Nickel Plate Mine operated 1900–1955, Hedley Mascot Mine during 1936–1949, and a merged operation 1988–1996.

== Early community ==
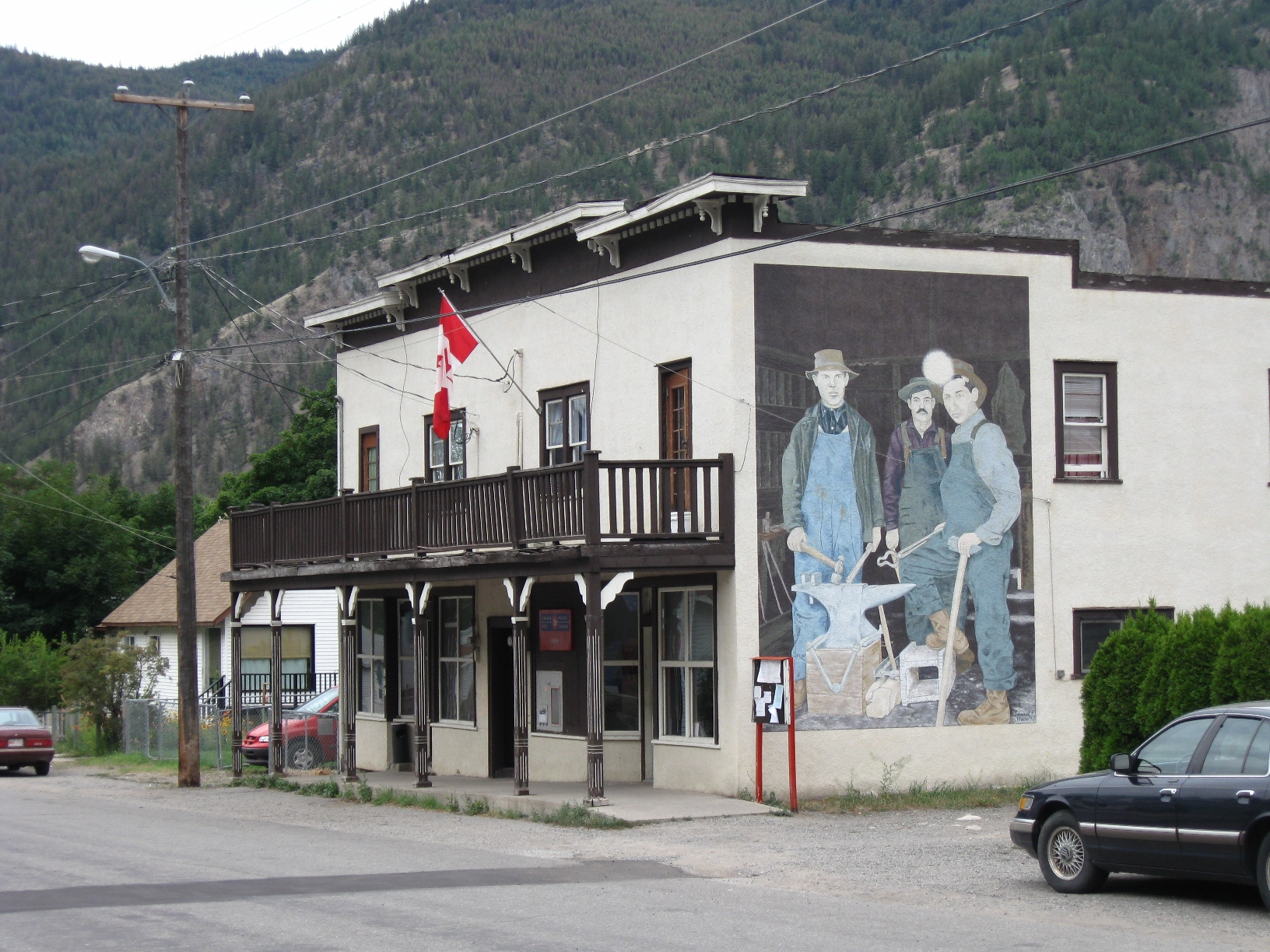
Post office, Hedley, 2009.

In 1900, the Hedley townsite was laid out. That year, a wagon road to Penticton opened. The next year, David G. Hackney opened a hotel, Wm. Hine & Co. established a general store, and the Old Hedley Rd was extended to Princeton. In 1902, J.A. Schubert opened a branch general store, and W.E. Welby initiated the Penticton–Hedley–Princeton stage service. At this time, the population peaked at over 1,000.

F. M. Gillespie was the inaugural postmaster 1903–1918, operating from the Schubert store. In 1913, the post office moved to Love's Drug Store, and before the mid-1930s, to the present building. In 1905, the Bank of British North America branch that opened was the first bank in the Similkameen Valley. The Hedley Gazette was published 1905–1917. Each destroyed by fire, the early hotels were the Hedley 1901–1956, Grand Union 1902–1920, Commercial 1903–1956, Similkameen 1904–1916, New Zealand 1905–1911, and Great Northern 1905–1957. In January 1957, fire consumed a whole block, razing much of the business district. Coupled with the three hotel fires occurring within months, the context reflected a declining population, which had peaked at 816 in 1943, but plummeted after the railway withdrawal in 1954, and the end of mining in 1955.

== Railway ==
The Vancouver, Victoria and Eastern Railway (VV&E) Keremeos–Hedley–Princeton service opened in 1909, providing access to the Great Northern Railway (GN) network.

Hedley station was 7.1 kilometres (4.4 mi) west of Bradshaw, and 8.4 kilometres (5.2 mi) east of Corey.

In May 1915, Canadian Pacific Railway inaugurated service on the Kettle Valley Railway from the coast to the Kootenays, with a connection to the GN at Princeton.

Princeton–Hedley was abandoned in 1937, but had been unused since a bridge washout in 1934. Hedley–Kermeos closed in 1954.

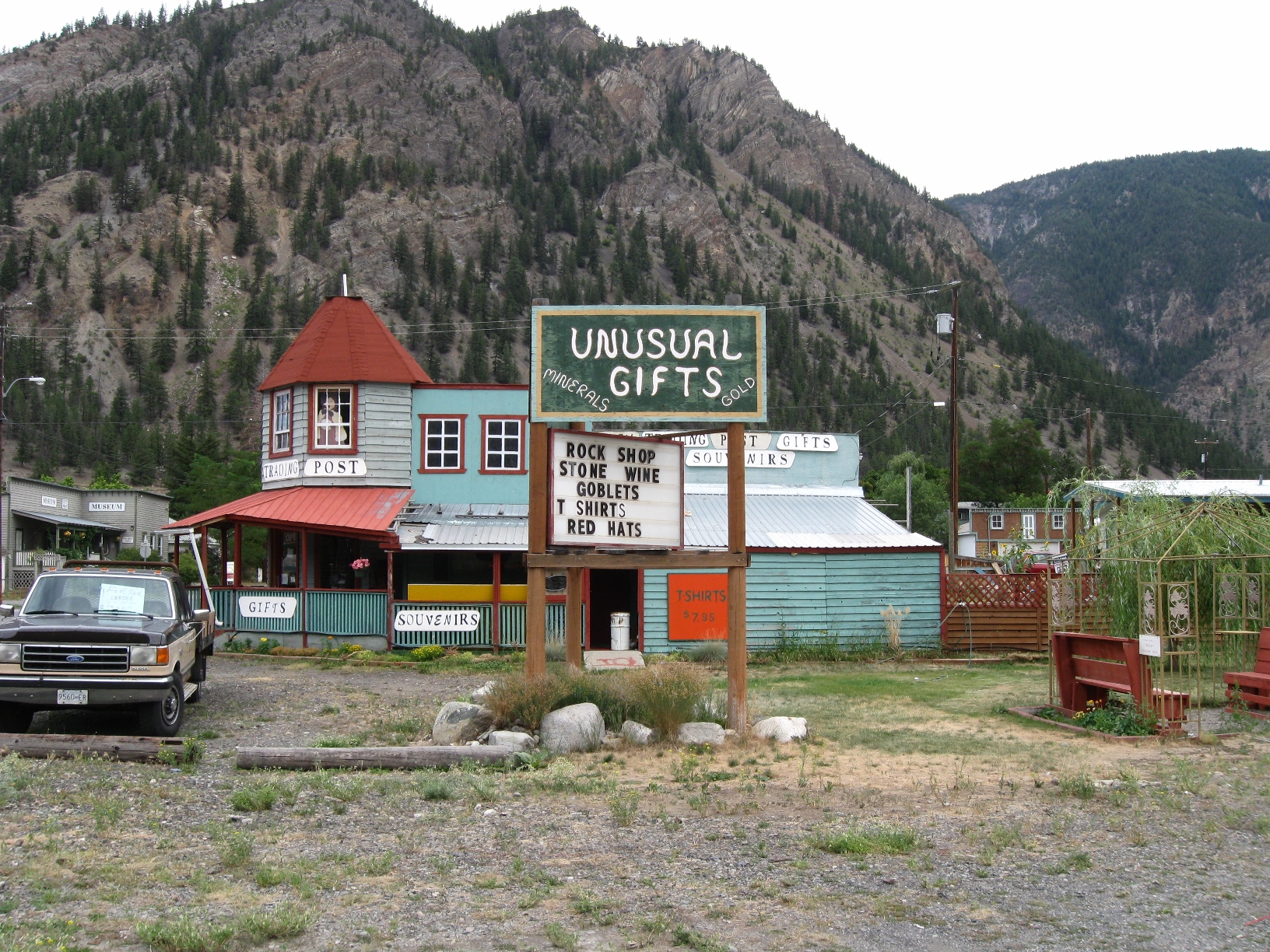
Museum, Hedley, 2009.

== Later community ==
The Hedley Heritage Museum and Tea Room contains artifacts and photographs of the mining era. Some heritage houses are scattered throughout the town. The former Grace Methodist (1903) is the oldest building, having housed the first school in that year. In 2018, fire destroyed the Hitching Post Restaurant (1904). The Hedley Country Market (Motherlode Store) (1905) still operates. The post office hours are six days a week. The population has stabilized, being 252 in 2011, and 242 in 2016.

== Filming location ==
=== Movies ===
- 1987: Malone, starring Burt Reynolds
- 2001: Part of The Pledge, starring Jack Nicholson and directed by Sean Penn

=== Television ===
- 2008: mini-series "The Andromeda Strain".
- Featured on the historical television series Gold Trails and Ghost Towns Season 3, Episode 10.

== Climate ==
Climate data for Hedley (1981-2010): 517m
Month	Jan	Feb	Mar	Apr	May	Jun	Jul	Aug	Sep	Oct	Nov	Dec	Year
Record high °C (°F)	14.4 (57.9)	15.6 (60.1)	23.9 (75.0)	35.6 (96.1)	40.0 (104.0)	38.0 (100.4)	41.1 (106.0)	40.0 (104.0)	36.5 (97.7)	31.1 (88.0)	22.2 (72.0)	14.4 (57.9)	41.1 (106.0)
Mean daily maximum °C (°F)	0.2 (32.4)	4.2 (39.6)	10.7 (51.3)	16.0 (60.8)	20.5 (68.9)	24.1 (75.4)	28.1 (82.6)	28.1 (82.6)	22.5 (72.5)	13.7 (56.7)	5.0 (41.0)	−0.3 (31.5)	14.4 (57.9)
Daily mean °C (°F)	−2.7 (27.1)	−0.1 (31.8)	4.8 (40.6)	9.1 (48.4)	13.4 (56.1)	17.0 (62.6)	20.1 (68.2)	19.9 (67.8)	14.9 (58.8)	8.1 (46.6)	1.6 (34.9)	−3.1 (26.4)	8.6 (47.5)
Mean daily minimum °C (°F)	−5.7 (21.7)	−4.5 (23.9)	−1.1 (30.0)	2.2 (36.0)	6.3 (43.3)	9.9 (49.8)	12.1 (53.8)	11.8 (53.2)	7.3 (45.1)	2.4 (36.3)	−1.8 (28.8)	−6.0 (21.2)	2.7 (36.9)
Record low °C (°F)	−32.8 (−27.0)	−32.2 (−26.0)	−26.1 (−15.0)	−10.0 (14.0)	−3.3 (26.1)	0.0 (32.0)	3.9 (39.0)	0.0 (32.0)	−5.0 (23.0)	−18.0 (−0.4)	−29.0 (−20.2)	−35.0 (−31.0)	−35.0 (−31.0)
Average precipitation mm (inches)	33.0 (1.30)	18.8 (0.74)	21.1 (0.83)	26.0 (1.02)	44.1 (1.74)	50.1 (1.97)	41.0 (1.61)	40.1 (1.58)	27.9 (1.10)	26.5 (1.04)	35.3 (1.39)	33.2 (1.31)	397.2 (15.64)
Source: Environment Canada

Climate data for Hedley NP Mine (1981-2010): 1651m
Month	Jan	Feb	Mar	Apr	May	Jun	Jul	Aug	Sep	Oct	Nov	Dec	Year
Record high °C (°F)	10.0 (50.0)	13.3 (55.9)	18.9 (66.0)	22.8 (73.0)	26.5 (79.7)	28.5 (83.3)	32.8 (91.0)	31.5 (88.7)	31.0 (87.8)	24.5 (76.1)	18.3 (64.9)	13.0 (55.4)	32.8 (91.0)
Mean daily maximum °C (°F)	−1.1 (30.0)	0.0 (32.0)	2.8 (37.0)	6.6 (43.9)	11.2 (52.2)	15.2 (59.4)	19.2 (66.6)	19.5 (67.1)	15.1 (59.2)	7.9 (46.2)	0.9 (33.6)	−1.4 (29.5)	8.0 (46.4)
Daily mean °C (°F)	−4.5 (23.9)	−3.7 (25.3)	−1.1 (30.0)	2.4 (36.3)	6.6 (43.9)	10.3 (50.5)	13.7 (56.7)	14.2 (57.6)	10.3 (50.5)	4.2 (39.6)	−2.4 (27.7)	−4.7 (23.5)	3.8 (38.8)
Mean daily minimum °C (°F)	−7.9 (17.8)	−7.3 (18.9)	−5.0 (23.0)	−1.9 (28.6)	1.9 (35.4)	5.3 (41.5)	8.2 (46.8)	8.8 (47.8)	5.4 (41.7)	0.5 (32.9)	−5.5 (22.1)	−8.0 (17.6)	−0.4 (31.3)
Record low °C (°F)	−38.9 (−38.0)	−33.0 (−27.4)	−31.7 (−25.1)	−19.4 (−2.9)	−13.3 (8.1)	−7.8 (18.0)	−6.7 (19.9)	−7.2 (19.0)	−8.3 (17.1)	−20.6 (−5.1)	−36.0 (−32.8)	−31.1 (−24.0)	−38.9 (−38.0)
Average precipitation mm (inches)	45.8 (1.80)	34.1 (1.34)	35.7 (1.41)	32.1 (1.26)	69.3 (2.73)	66.6 (2.62)	52.9 (2.08)	52.3 (2.06)	36.4 (1.43)	34.4 (1.35)	50.3 (1.98)	45.8 (1.80)	555.7 (21.86)
Average snowfall cm (inches)	44.3 (17.4)	33.1 (13.0)	34.8 (13.7)	25.3 (10.0)	16.5 (6.5)	4.4 (1.7)	0.7 (0.3)	0.3 (0.1)	4.9 (1.9)	15.7 (6.2)	44.1 (17.4)	45.0 (17.7)	269.1 (105.9)
Source: Environment Canada
