= Kitsault River =

River in British Columbia

Coordinates: 55°29′00″N 129°28′00″W

The Kitsault River is a river on the North Coast of British Columbia, Canada, located at the head of Alice Arm, which is the east arm of Observatory Inlet, which is itself an arm of Portland Inlet (see Portland Canal). Located at the mouth of the river are the localities of Alice Arm (a former post office and steamer landing), Kitsault (a former mining town) and Gits'oohl, a community of the Nisga'a people which was the Gitzault Indian Reserve No. 24 prior to the Nisga'a Treaty.

== Name ==
"Kitsault" is derived from the Nisga'a language phrase and the name of the local Nisga'a community, Gits'oohl, which means "at the inside", "a ways in back (of something)", i.e. the inlets. Variant spellings have included Kitzault, Kitzaulte, Gitzault, Chigitsoult, and Kitsaulte.

== See also ==
- List of rivers of British Columbia
- Kitsault
