= Dollis Creek =

Stream in British Columbia and Yukon, Canada

Coordinates: 60°00′00″N 137°07′00″W

Dollis Creek (formerly Squaw Creek) is a creek that spans the border between British Columbia and the Yukon. The creek is 8 miles in length and flows from the Atlin Country region of British Columbia north across the BC-Yukon boundary into the Tatshenshini River approximately 10 miles from Old Dalton Post.

== First Nations ==
In 1927 a Klukshu Native called Paddy Duncan discovered gold in Dollis Creek. First Nations people staked the entire creek. This made Dollis Creek the only creek in British Columbia controlled by First Nations people. Between 1927 and 1931 the First Nations people worked the creek.

== Gold Rush ==
By 1932 there were Europeans mining the creek. The largest gold nugget recovered from the creek weighed just over 46 troy ounces (1.4 kg) in 1937. Total gold production did not exceed $150,000 from this creek.

== Name ==
On January 15, 2008, the creek was officially renamed "Dollis Creek" by the BC Geographical Names Office. This name derives from Dollis Brook, a river in England. The name "Squaw Creek" had been previously rescinded on December 8, 2000.
