= Milk River Natural Area =

Natural area in Alberta, Canada

- Location within Alberta
- Location: County of Forty Mile
- Nearest city: Medicine Hat
- Coordinates: 49°2′34.8″N 110°42′10.8″W
- Area: 5,344 ha (20.63 sq mi)
- Designation: June 1987
- Administrator: Cypress District Office of Alberta Tourism, Parks and Recreation

Milk River Natural Area is a provincially designated protected area in the southeastern corner of the province of Alberta, Canada, approximately 160 km south of the city of Medicine Hat. It lies primarily in the County of Forty Mile with a small portion in southwest Cypress County. On the Alberta Township System (ATS) grid it is located in portions of Township 1, Range 5 and 6, and Township 2, Range 6, west of the Fourth Meridian.

At 5,344 ha (13,205 acres), Milk River was designated in June 1987 as an Order-in-Council Natural Area for conservation purposes under the Wilderness Areas, Ecological Reserves, Natural Areas and Heritage Rangelands Act and is Alberta's 100th Natural Area. It is owned by the provincial government as Public Land and administered by the Cypress District Office of Alberta Tourism, Parks and Recreation. Milk River Natural Area sits on the international border with the United States with Montana to the south, and is adjacent to the Kennedy Coulee Ecological Reserve to the west, with Pinhorn Provincial Grazing Reserve just beyond Kennedy Coulee. Other protected areas nearby include the Onefour Heritage Rangeland, Writing-on-Stone Provincial Park, and Cypress Hills Interprovincial Park. Access to Milk River Natural Area is challenging due to its remoteness and weather conditions: local roads and trails are impassable during or after wet weather, there is little to no cell phone coverage, and permission must be obtained when crossing grazing lease areas. However, this has helped maintain the area's relatively undisturbed condition and protected it from significant human impact. Canoes, kayaks, and inflatable rafts on float trips occasionally ply the waters of the Milk River through the Natural Area. While "no-trace" camping is permitted, it is not encouraged, and there are no visitor facilities provided.

== Natural and human history ==
Geologically, the Milk River Natural Area is part of the Oldman and Foremost Formations, consisting of sandstone, siltstone, and carbonaceous shale, with isolated occurrences of igneous Sweetgrass Hills intrusives. The most prominent feature of the natural area is the Milk River Canyon. At up to 1,500 meters wide and 150 meters deep, it is the deepest in the Canadian plains. One of only five exposed igneous dikes in the Canadian plains, nicknamed the "Rooster Comb" for its distinctive size and shape, lies in the natural area. The Milk River itself is the only river in Alberta that flows to the Gulf of Mexico, joining the Missouri River near Nashua, Montana. Throughout the region lie a multitude of Cretaceous-era dinosaur fossils, as well as many archaeological sites, a legacy of the Blackfoot indigenous people who hunted, gathered, and camped in the area prior to European contact. Findings of projectile points indicate the area has likely been sporadically inhabited since the end of the last glaciation.

== Ecology ==
The Milk River Natural Area is part of the Grasslands Natural Region, one of six natural regions in Alberta. Within the Grasslands Region, it is part of the Dry Mixedgrass Natural Subregion, characterized by the most arid conditions in Alberta, with hot summers, cold winters with little snow cover, and high evaporation leaving a large moisture deficit in the growing season. Annual precipitation averages less than 300mm (12 inches). Soils of the area are primarily solonetzic and brown chernozemic. At the next sub-level, it is part of the Northwestern Glaciated Plains Ecoregion, the predominant ecoregion throughout the Milk River watershed. With its diverse landscape of grasslands, shrubs, badlands, wetlands, and riparian woodlands, the Milk River Natural Area supports a large number of rare, threatened, and endangered species in a relatively small amount of space. Overall, 80% of Alberta's species at risk are concentrated in the Milk River Watershed area as a whole. Fire is a significant ecological process, with the last large wildfire having occurred in August 2007. It was caused by a lightning strike in Montana and crossed the international border, but was quickly suppressed after burning 125 hectares of the natural area and 38 hectares in neighboring Kennedy Coulee Ecological Reserve. As a relatively large and undisturbed representation of natural mixedgrass containing rare or unique landforms, habitat for focal species, and intact riparian areas, it has been identified as an Environmentally Significant Area (ESA) with national significance.

== Flora ==
The diverse terrain and soils of the Milk River Natural Area lend themselves to a large variety of plant communities. In the protected area, aside from non-vegetated badlands, the primary vegetation cover is dry mixed grassland, with the dominant species being needle-and-thread (Hesperostipa comate) and blue grama grass (Bouteloua gracilis). Other grassland species associated with the area include northern wheat grass (Agropyron dasystachyum), western wheat grass (Pascopyrum smithii), prairie june grass (Koeleria macrantha), sandberg bluegrass (Poa sandbergii) and various sedge species. The flood plains surrounding the river contain large stands of plains cottonwood (Populus deltoides) and sagebrush flats. Moss phlox (Phlox subulata) and prairie selaginella (Selaginella densa) are common forbs. Complex but often sparse vegetation communities adjusted to harsh conditions exist at the border between coulees and grasslands and feature species such as mosses, lichens, black greasewood (Sarcobatus vermiculatus), rabbitbrush (Chrysothamnus nauseosus), long-leaved sage, sagebrush (Artemisia frigida), and povertyweed (Monolepis nuttalliana). The endangered in Alberta soapweed (Yucca glauca), mutually dependent upon the yucca moth (Tegeticula yuccasella), also occurs in the area.

== Fauna ==
=== Amphibians and reptiles ===
With its combination of grassland, riparian habitat, coulees and badlands, the Milk River Natural Area and Kennedy Coulee Ecological Reserve host a variety of amphibians and reptiles, including rare northern leopard frogs (Rana pipiens), listed as threatened in Alberta and both a Canadian species at risk (SARA) and Committee on the Status of Endangered Wildlife in Canada (COSEWIC) species of special concern, as well as prairie rattlesnake (Crotalus viridis), bullsnake (Pituophis catenifer sayi), western hognose snake (Heterodon nasicus), western painted turtle (Chrysemys picta), garter snake (Thamnophis radix), and the nationally and provincially endangered short-horned lizard (Phrynosoma douglassi), which is at the northern limit of its geographical range here. The northern leopard frog and prairie rattlesnake in particular are indicator species of the ecological health of the Milk River watershed.

=== Birds ===
The natural area, which has been named as an Important Bird Area, is studded with cliffs and eroded sandstone badlands that serve as important nesting and foraging habitat to the area's raptors. Important birds of prey are the golden eagle (Aquila chrysaetos), ferruginous hawk (Buteo regalis), prairie falcon (Falco mexicanus), and burrowing owl (Athene cunicularia), of which the burrowing owl and ferruginous hawk are considered endangered in Alberta, and the prairie falcon, a species of special concern. Raptor populations have experienced rebounds since the 1970s when the insecticide DDT was outlawed, but new concerns about other pesticides and PCBs along with habitat degradation and land use conversion are contributing to the decline of species such as the burrowing owl. The prairie falcon is at its northern range limit in southern Alberta and although populations appear to be stable at present, loss of grasslands and subsequent decline in their prey of ground squirrels may lead to reduced numbers of falcons. Endemic to western North America, the ferruginous hawk is under threatened status nationally and appears to have been decreasing in numbers since at least 1987, possibly due to prey availability, or habitat or land use change; subsequently, nest poles have been erected to facilitate nesting. The Milk River is also home to many pond and wetland birds, and the grasslands are sharp-tailed grouse (Pedioecetes phasianellus) dancing grounds, or leks. Sharp-tailed grouse also appear to be declining in Alberta and are considered a sensitive species due to the increase of land-use conversion to agriculture.

=== Mammals ===
Until the late 1800s, large herds of bison grazed the area until they were extirpated by human hunting, and cattle have — to a degree — taken their place as grazers, maintaining the grassland ecosystem in a mix of grazed and ungrazed patches. Pronghorn (Antilocapra Americana) and mule deer (Odocoileus hemionus) are also present on the grasslands along with deer mice, voles, and Richardson's ground squirrel, an important food source for the ferruginous hawk and occasional burrow host to the burrowing owl. The formerly extirpated and subsequently reintroduced swift fox (Vulpes velox), currently listed as endangered provincially and downgraded to threatened nationally in 2009, is resident as well. Swift foxes were originally abundant across the prairies, but population declines caused by land use conversion, trapping, hunting, predation by domestic dogs, competition with coyotes, and rodent control programs led to their elimination from Alberta in 1938 and declared extirpated in 1978. The swift fox was reintroduced to Canada in 1983 from the progeny of a captive breeding program using Colorado and South Dakota stock, a controversial but relatively successful initiative. The current population is estimated at 647 foxes in Canada as of 2006, but predation by coyotes and golden eagles continues to be a limiting factor, with golden eagles causing 75% of the deaths of swift foxes in 1997. In addition, due to their small size and inability to see above tall vegetation, and their avoidance of agricultural lands and the associated chemical spraying which reduces their insect prey, swift foxes appear to be habitat specialists preferring shortgrass native prairie and land use conversion to agriculture is a continued threat. The area's woodland habitat is home to a herd of elk, along with porcupines, cottontail rabbits, and white-tailed deer. The badlands area of habitat in the Milk River Natural Area is host to bobcats (Lynx rufus), listed as sensitive, and scorpions (Paruroctonus boreus).

=== Fish ===
The area features three rare fish species: the venomous stonecat (Noturus flavus), the only catfish species in Alberta, St. Mary's Sculpin (Cottus bairdi punctulatus), and the western silvery minnow (Hybognathus argyritis). All three are under threatened status in Alberta, and the western silvery minnow was upgraded to endangered in Canada by COSEWIC in April 2008. Their greatest threats are habitat alteration or loss, changes in water flow or drought water levels, increased siltation, elevated water temperatures, surface water extraction, dam construction, and for the western silvery minnow, introduction of predatory fish species.

=== Invertebrates ===
Weidemeyer's admiral butterfly (Limenitis weidemeyerii) is only known to exist in Canada within the Milk River watershed, as well as the yucca moth mentioned previously. An estimated population of 3000 adult Weidemeyer's admiral adults exist in a total approximate total occupied area of less than one square kilometer, and are susceptible to extreme natural weather events or drought. They are ranked as a species of special concern provincially in Alberta and nationally in Canada but a knowledge gap exists and further research is needed to determine more accurate numbers and range.

== Environmental threats and issues ==
Elements of concern to the area are fire, over- or under-grazing, native species reintroduction, human recreational (camping and hunting) and educational/scientific use, resource exploration, linear development, and invasive species. Invasive species, primarily weeds, are a significant threat that crowd out native plant species and reduce habitat and food sources for native animals, birds, fish, and insects. Weeds are quick colonizers that often move into an area disturbed by fire or human activity. Linear developments such as roads, pipelines, and powerlines often provide a vector for invasive species to enter new areas. Because of their rapid and opportunistic spread, weeds also often lack the deep root system of native plants and thus contribute to bank instability and soil erosion. The nodding thistle weed (Carduus nutans) was discovered in the area in 2006. Several other weed species have been found in the natural area, including the highly aggressive downy brome (Bromus tectorum), creeping meadow foxtail (Alopecurus arundinaceus), crested wheatgrass (Agropyron cristatum), and Russian olive (Elaeagnus angustifolia). Several of these species have invaded from across the U.S. border into Canada. Formerly utilized as a reclamation species, crested wheatgrass has had detrimental effects on soil and grazing. Russian olive, imported as a soil stabilizer, windbreak, and ornamental, reduces biodiversity of riparian areas.

== Management ==
Once belonging to the Lost River Ranch lease, the land that now comprises the Milk River Natural Area was grazed infrequently and was therefore deleted from the grazing lease under the Public Lands Act in 1978 and 1979. Some resource exploration has occurred over the years and several wells were drilled but have subsequently been abandoned. Coal was also briefly mined but due to the area's remoteness was also abandoned. The Milk River Natural Area and Kennedy Coulee Ecological Reserve were established with the intent "to protect and maintain the ecological and aesthetic character of a representative example of the Mixed Grassland Natural Region with minimal human interference;" specifically, protecting ecological diversity and processes, native species and habitats, rare and significant natural features, recreation, education, and scientific research. Management interference is intended to be minimal and "let nature take its course" wherever possible, while managing some ecological processes such as fires and controlled grazing. A balance of grazing regimes is important to maintain the combination of short and medium grasses defining the dry mixedgrass natural subregion. Cattle do not graze in the same way as the now-extirpated bison did, but have been used to simulate natural processes. Grazing management maintains the grassland ecosystem in its climax state, but overgrazing must be avoided to prevent soil erosion and loss of biodiversity. Rangeland health assessments aid this goal by periodically evaluating the area's ecosystem health, including measuring factors such as grazing intensity, weed occurrence, species composition, site stability, and soil and plant health. The 2011 rangeland survey concluded that the Milk River Natural Area overall is in excellent health and meeting its management goals, and that plant community health and grazing management were found to be far exceeding provincial standards.

Fires have historically been a vital component of the grassland ecosystem, but pose a threat to human life and property. In the Milk River Natural Area, management policy is suppression of wildfires, with prescribed controlled burns allowed for ecosystem maintenance purposes to manage the grassland in its climax state. Campfires are permitted but discouraged. Following the 2007 wildfire, inventories were conducted which showed an increase in species richness and also good recovery of native species with little invasion of exotics. Invasive weed species that have been found in the area, such as nodding thistle, are being controlled by spot spraying and hand picking. Larger species like the Russian olive are cut down and spot-treated.

Recreational vehicle use also bears monitoring, as all-terrain vehicles (ATV's) and larger vehicles can damage streambeds and tear up fragile vegetation. Public vehicles are prohibited south and west of the existing trail system and from the river bottom and badlands areas, and from the ecological reserve altogether, except for management purposes and fire protection, or education and non-destructive research.

In addition to the Milk River itself being an occasional destination for paddle sports, other recreational uses of the area include hunting and camping, which bring their own potential impacts on the environment and the area's species at risk. Fire especially is a risk from unattended campfires. Close approach by humans to ferruginous hawk nests will flush them and can eventually cause nest abandonment. Hunting and/or ammunition restrictions could reduce lead poisoning in golden eagles, possibly caused by ingesting lead shot in their prey.

Reintroduction of extirpated native species, such as the swift fox, is another issue that must be balanced with the needs and tolerances of existing species. Other extirpated species that formerly occupied the grasslands were the bison (Bison bison), wolf (Canis lupus) and grizzly bear (Ursus arctos horribilis), which may not be feasible to reintroduce due to cost and potential conflict with humans. Educational and scientific pursuits require guidelines and permits to protect the landscape from inadvertent damage such as collection of rare species or archaeological samples. Extraction of natural resources such as minerals, gas, oil, and coal are incompatible with the management intent of the protected area, as are linear developments such as roads, pipelines and power lines. As such, only freehold areas may be explored for resource extraction, and no new linear developments are planned; however, construction of a viewing area is being considered to limit and concentrate public access to an approved and controlled area. Fencing and signage, used for public safety and resource protection, are also kept to a minimum.

Currently, the human population of the Milk River watershed area — already rural with a population density of under .5 persons per square kilometer — is decreasing due to factors such as an aging population, the decline of small-scale farming, loss of community services such as hospitals and schools, and lack of job opportunities. This lack of population pressure, along with the inaccessibility of the Milk River Natural Area and the management plan followed by Alberta Tourism, Parks and Recreation, helps to maintain the ecological integrity of the protected area.
