= Production order =

Order to produce material within a timeframe

A production order is an order issued within a company to produce a specific quantity of material within a certain timeframe. A production order may be issued pursuant to a sales order, and its issuance triggers a number of events. If components in the bill of materials are in stock, reservations are generated for those items; if they are not in stock, then requisition orders may be generated. Requisition orders may also be generated for production that occurs externally to the firm. Planned costs for the order are also generated and capacity requirements are generated for the work centers. It is mostly used in trading.
