= Snowfield mine =

Gold mine in British Columbia, Canada

- Location: British Columbia, Canada
- Products: Gold

The Snowfield mine is one of the largest gold mines in Canada and in the world. The mine is located in the west of the country in British Columbia. The mine has estimated reserves of 35 million oz of gold.
