= Krishnan Suthanthiran =

Indian-Canadian businessman (born 1947)

Krishnan Suthanthiran (born 1947) is an Indian-Canadian multi-millionaire and businessman. Born in India and educated in Canada, Suthanthiran is known for his ownership of the company town Kitsault, British Columbia and companies involved in the manufacturing of medical devices.

== Personal life and career history ==
Suthanthiran was born in southern India in 1947 to a family of grocery-store owners. In 1969, he immigrated to Canada to study mechanical engineering at Carleton University in Ottawa, Ontario, completing his master's degree in 1971.

He developed an interest in cancer research after the death of his father, which has concerned much of his work since. He took pre-medical courses before moving to the United States to work in oncology.

In 1977, he founded health care supplies manufacturer Best Medical International in Springfield, Virginia.

In 2005, he purchased the former company town of Kitsault, British Columbia, Canada, for US $5.7 million. The town had housed miners' families, but was abandoned in 1982. The town is 20 years into a process of being preserved and is used to house miners working in the area. While Suthanthiran has proposed several plans for revitalizing the town, including an artists' and scientists' retreat, a Liquefied natural gas terminal, a movie studio and a resort, Kitsault remains as it was when it was first abandoned.

In 2007, he established the Best Cure Foundation in Virginia as a non-profit entity to promote healthcare and education globally.

On May 1st 2009, he purchased Best Theratronics, a company located in Kanata, Ontario that manufactures cyclotrons and medical equipment.

Suthanthiran's political involvements include three parties he founded: the Proud Indian Party in 2013, Proud American Party in 2020 and Proud Canadian Party in 2021.

== Best Medical Belgium case ==
In 2011, Suthanthiran acquired a nuclear medical business located in Belgium which would adopt the name Best Medical Belgium. Following the deal, Best Medical Belgium transferred €9.6 million to companies owned by Suthanthiran in Canada. Six months later, Best Medical Belgium declared insolvency. Belgian authorities allege that these actions constitute Best Canada liquidating the Belgian firm's assets in an effort to render it fraudulently insolvent. They are investigating the firm for potential money laundering. Suthanthiran denies the allegations.

Belgium has sought assistance from Canada under a mutual legal assistance treaty. On behalf of Belgium, counsel for the Attorney General of Canada obtained search warrants, authorizing the search of the offices of Best Theratronics’ in Vancouver and Best Canada in Ottawa for records relating to what Belgium regarded as “criminal transactions,” according to a summary filed to the Supreme Court of Canada. Best Theratronics’ Canadian premises were searched and records were seized, including documents describing how cyclotrons are constructed.

Suthanthiran has argued that his firms' competitors in Belgium have motivated the seizure, conspiring with Belgian authorities to steal trade secrets. Ontario judges were unconvinced by this argument and initial motions to prevent the seized documents from being transferred to Belgium were denied. However, the Supreme Court of British Columbia found there was some evidence suggesting the transactions from Best Medical Belgium to firms owned by Suthanthiran in Canada were legitimate, which could challenge the validity of the search warrant issued for the offices of Best Theratronics. Subsequent proceedings in Ontario in light of the conclusion drawn by the Supreme Court of BC found that the warrant issued for the offices of Best Canada did not share the same issues, and as such remained valid. Suthanthiran has stated he will continue to challenge the decision
