= Alice Arm =

Inlet in British Columbia

- Location in British Columbia
- Location: British Columbia, Canada
- Coordinates: 55°27′03″N 129°35′19″W
- Type: Fjord
- Part of: Observatory Inlet

Alice Arm is the east arm of Observatory Inlet, which itself is an arm of Portland Inlet, on the North Coast of British Columbia, Canada, near the border with the American state of Alaska. The abandoned settlement and steamer landing of Alice Arm, is located on the east side of Observatory Inlet at the mouth of the Kitsault River.

== Name ==
Part of the traditional territory and resources of the Nisga'a, its name in the Nisga'a language is K'alii Ts'im Gits'oohl (lit. "inside, a good ways in behind").

Its English name was conferred in 1868 by Captain Daniel Pender in honour of Alice Mary Tomlinson, second daughter of Richard Woods, registrar of the Supreme Court of British Columbia, and wife of the Reverend Robert Tomlinson in charge of the Anglican mission at Kincolith (Ging̱olx), near the mouth of the Nass. In the same area, Alice Rock was also named for Mrs. Tomlinson, who travelled with her husband immediately after their wedding day in 1868 in a twenty-four-day journey to Kincolith in a Haida canoe.

Alice Woods and Robert Tomlinson were married in Victoria in April 1868.

== See also ==
- Anyox
