= Fairview, British Columbia =

Fairview
- Location of Fairview in British Columbia
- Coordinates: 49°10′30″N 119°36′00″W
- Country: Canada
- Province: British Columbia

Fairview is a ghost town in British Columbia on the west side of the Okanagan River between Cawston and Oliver. It is the original townsite for what is now the town of Oliver, famous for the Fairview Hotel that burned down in 1902.

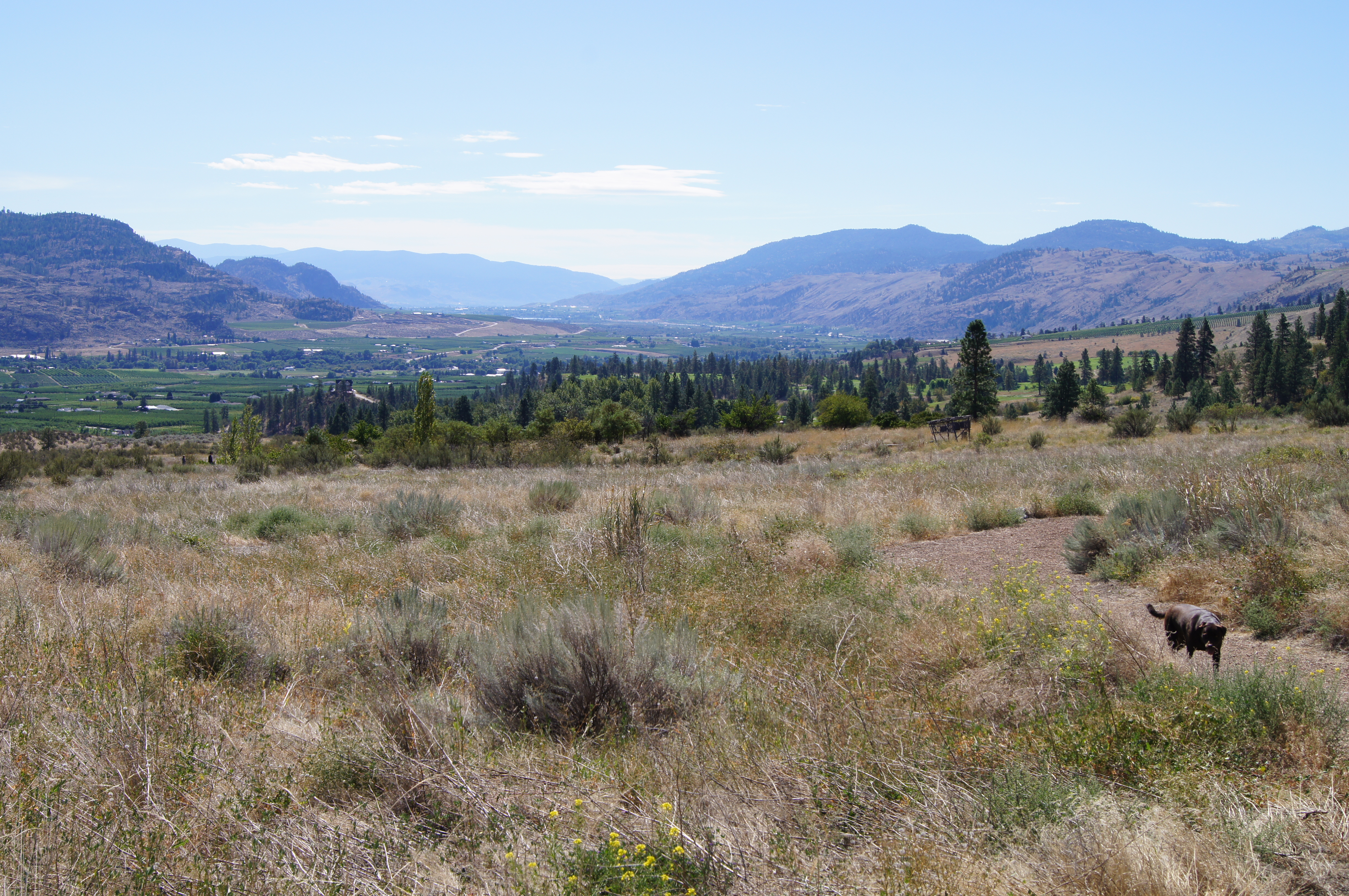
Site of the former location of Fairview, looking south towards Oliver

The area was first discovered in 1887 by a prospector known as "One-Armed Reed". In 1888, two others, Gwatkin and Shehan, were Crown-granted the Stemwinder Claim. Many other interests were staked, and by 1893, Fairview (as the place became known) boasted of being "The largest city North of San Francisco." Buildings, such as saloons, were erected to serve the needs of the rising population. In 1897, the Fairview Hotel (nicknamed the "Big Teepee") was built. It burned down in 1902. By 1906, Fairview's gold began to play out, and most miners turned to other prospects. By 1919, Fairview had become a ghost town. Many historic sites can still be visited at Fairview, such as the Fairview Cemetery just off Fairview Road, the stampmill above Tinhorn Creek Road, and many mines along the side of a mountain. Two children died from sickness and are buried at the cemetery. Visitors can still visit the Fairview Jail that was relocated beside the Oliver and District Museum.

== Fairview Hotel ==
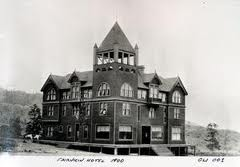
The Fairview Hotel as it appeared in 1900.

The "Golden Gate" was the first hotel at Fairview. It was built in 1892 by F.R. Kline, the first of five hotels in the mining town in the boom years. The Fairview Hotel, known as the "Big Teepee," burned to the ground in 1902. The Fairview Hotel was three stories tall. In the debris of this old hotel coins, rings and other items of jewellery lost in the blaze at the time have been recovered. During the 1970s, local historian Bill Barlee visited the remains of the Fairview Hotel. Barlee sifted through the rubble and found articles ranging from coins to keys, from silver and gold jewellery to doll sets.

== Television ==
Fairview was featured on the historical television series Gold Trails and Ghost Towns, season 1, episode 6.
