= Hopper (particulate collection container) =

Container used to funnel particulate matter

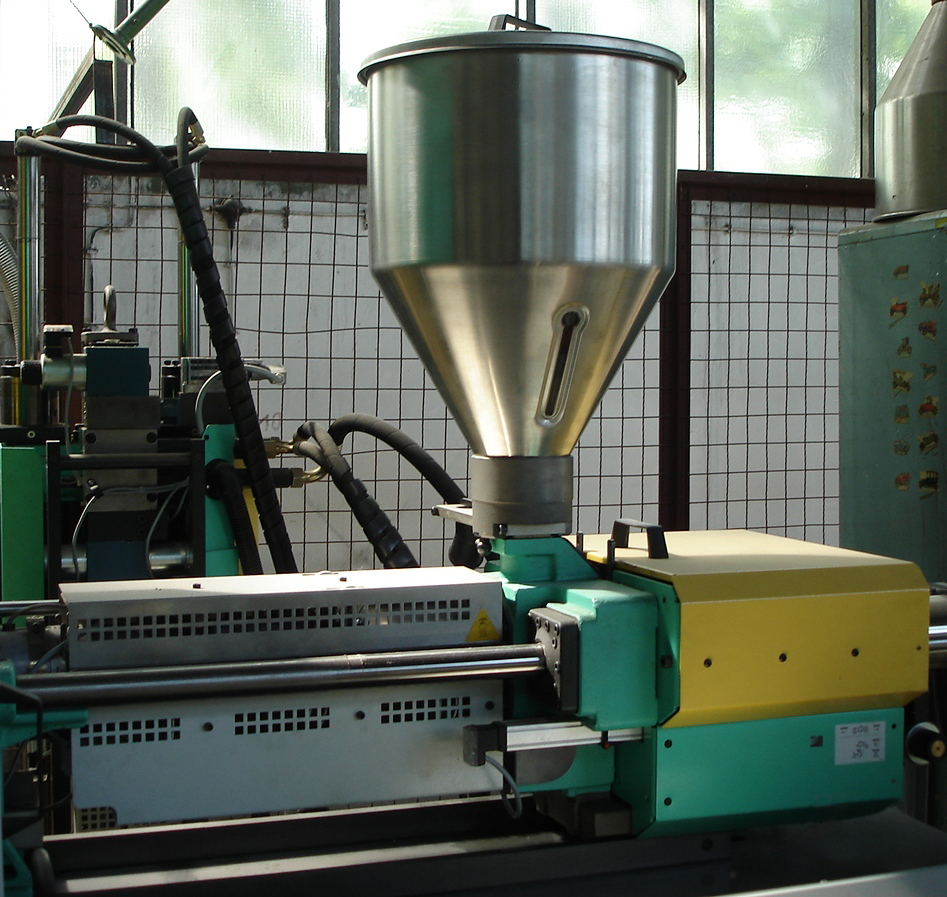
Plastic pellets going into an extruding machine

A hopper is a large, inverted pyramidal or conical container used in industrial processes to hold particulate matter or flowable material of any sort (e.g. dust, gravel, nuts, or seeds) and dispense these from the bottom when needed. In some specialized applications even small metal or plastic assembly components can be loaded and dispensed by small hopper systems. In the case of dust collection hoppers the dust can be collected from expelled air. Hoppers for dust collection are often installed in groups to allow for a greater collection quantity. Hoppers are used in many industries to hold material until it is needed, such as flour, sugar or nuts for food manufacturing, food pellets for livestock, crushed ores for refining, etc. Dust hoppers are employed in industrial processes that use air pollution control devices such as dust collectors, electrostatic precipitators, and baghouses/fabric filters. Most hoppers are made of steel.

== Process ==
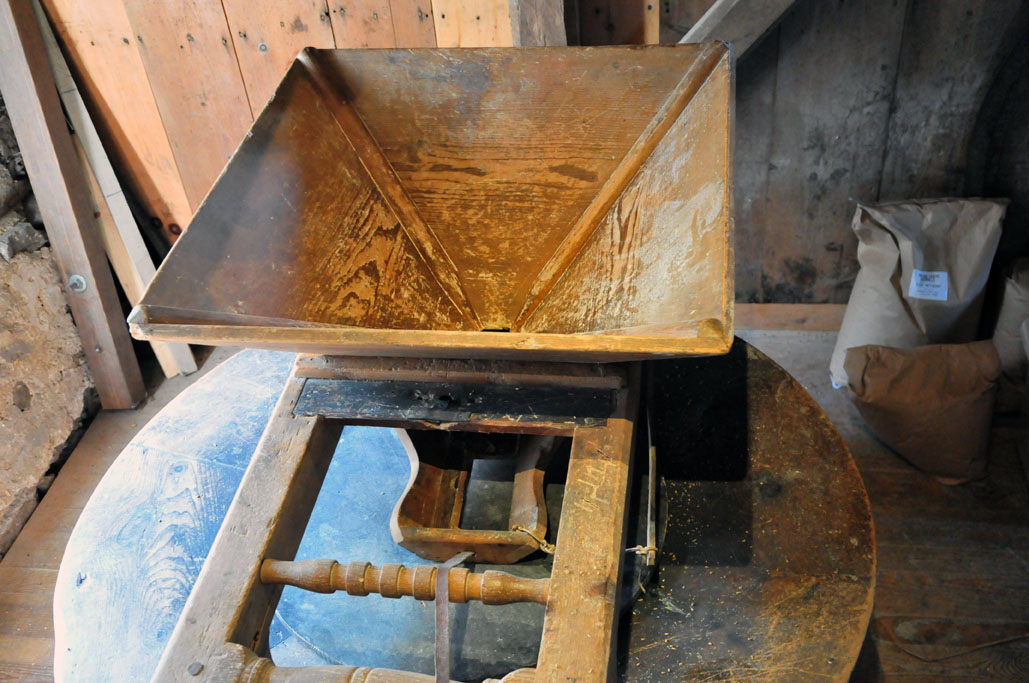
A wooden hopper for grain, on a millstone

Materials can be added either manually or automatically to the top of a hopper. For dust collection, it enters the hopper from a collection device. For example, baghouses are shaken or blown with compressed air to release caked-on dust from the bag. Precipitators use a rapping system to release the dirt. The crumbling dust falls into the hopper. Once the material in the hopper reaches capacity, it is released through an opening in the bottom with a diameter of about 8–12 inches (20–30 cm). Hoppers are rectangular or circular in cross section but have sides that slope at about a 60° angle. Slanted sides make it easier for the contained material to flow out. Conveyors are sometimes used to carry away the particulate matter.

== Important components ==
Hopper walls are often insulated to protect the outside environment and personnel from the contents. Often, the bottom 1/4 – 1/3 of the container is heated to eliminate the possibility of condensation inside the hopper.

The greatest difficulty associated with the removal of very fine material, like flour or dust, from a hopper is the compaction of the material. Moisture content, particle shape and size, and vibration are all factors that contribute to compaction. Typically, with such fine materials, vibrators are installed on the outer walls of a hopper to shake and release the material, however other kinds of discharging aids can be considered if necessary.
