= Phoenix, British Columbia =

Phoenix
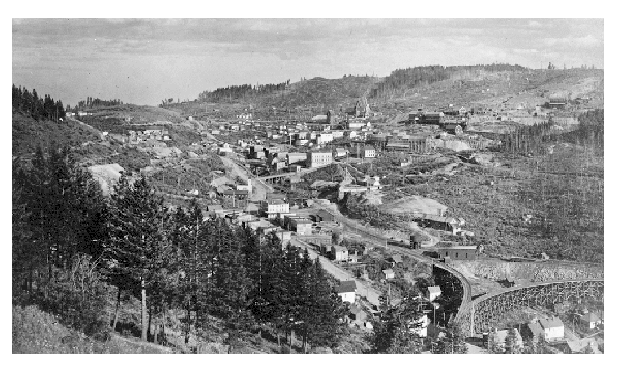
- Phoenix in 1905

- Location within British Columbia Location within Canada
- Coordinates: 49°6′0″N 118°35′0″W
- Country: Canada
- Province: British Columbia
- Region: Kootenays
- Regional district: Kootenay Boundary
- Incorporated: October 1, 1898
- Time zone: UTC-8 (PST)
  - Summer (DST): UTC-7 (PDT)

Phoenix is a ghost town in the Boundary Country of British Columbia, Canada, 11 km east of Greenwood. Once called the "highest city in Canada" by its citizens (1,412 metres / 4,633 feet above sea level) it was a booming copper mining community from the late 1890s until 1919. In its heyday it was home to 1,000 citizens and had an opera house, twenty hotels, a brewery and its own city hall. The Granby Consolidated Mining, Smelting and Power Company operated the Phoenix Mine, a copper mine that produced 13,678,901 tons of ore before operations ceased on June 14, 1919.

== Boom years ==
Historical population
Year	Pop.	±%
1901	866	—
1911	662	−23.6%
Sources: Statistics Canada

Copper was discovered in the area in 1891, credited to American prospector named Bob Denzler; it was later debated whether Denzler named the "Phoenix claim" after Phoenix, Arizona or the mythical phoenix of Egypt. His discovery became the first of many claims and a settlement called Greenwood Camp was built, but it was not until 1895 that the full riches of the area were realized and the boom really began. The log cabins of Greenwood Camp were replaced by frame houses and brick homes. Then, in 1896, the Canadian Pacific Railway and the Great Northern Railway arrived. By then, with the exception of the one at Rossland, the output of the mines was exceeding the combined output of every other copper mine in British Columbia.

The town got its own newspaper, the Phoenix Pioneer, in 1896 and on October 1, 1898, Greenwood Camp was renamed Phoenix when the first post office opened. Phoenix's magistrate, Judge Willie Williams, who served there from 1897 until 1913, became famous for his booming declaration, "I am the highest judge, in the highest court, in the highest city in Canada. By the early 1900s, Phoenix was a thriving community with electricity and telephone services, a hospital, banquet hall, ballroom, opera house and its own stage line. There was no lack of fine meals or accommodation: on the Christmas Day menu at the Brooklyn Hotel in 1911 the variety of delicacies included Russian caviar, Green Turtle soup and English plum pudding with brandy sauce. In 1911, Phoenix's hockey team won the provincial championship and asked for the right to compete for the Stanley Cup, but it was too late to qualify.

== Aftermath ==
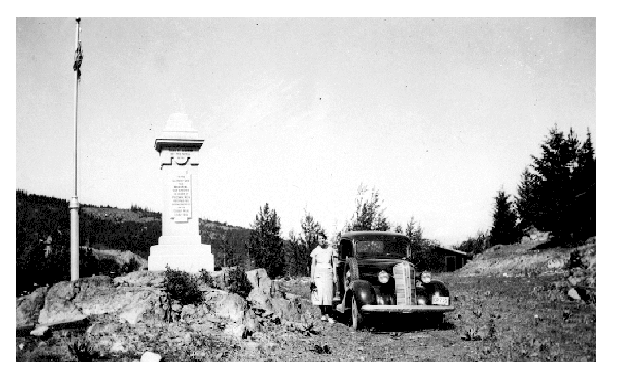
World War One cenotaph at Phoenix in 1937

When World War I ended in 1918, the price of copper dropped dramatically and Phoenix, which was completely reliant on its one industry, began to die. When the last ore was shipped out in 1919, most exited soon after. Many left their homes and belongings, making Phoenix the largest ghost town Canada had ever seen. In 1920 wrecking crews arrived to haul away the churches, halls, stores, skating rink and hospital – all of which were dismantled and re-erected in other communities.

An open pit mine operated in Phoenix during the 1950s and through to 1978 but the venture was ultimately abandoned and the mining had caused the historic buildings to be buried or bulldozed.

One remaining relic is Phoenix's World War I cenotaph. Another memorial can be found in nearby Greenwood where the open pit miners of the seventies erected a commemorative phoenix bird sculpture to mark the hopes that someday Phoenix will rise again. In recent years, locals have restored the pioneer cemetery in Phoenix.

== Television ==
Phoenix was featured on the historical television series Gold Trails and Ghost Towns, season 1, episode 3.

== See also ==
- List of ghost towns in British Columbia
