= Granby Consolidated Mining, Smelting and Power Company =

Copper and coal mining and smelting conglomerate, British Columbia

Granby mine
- Location in Canada
- Location: Phoenix, British Columbia, Canada; 49°05′56″N 118°35′52″W
- Products: Copper
- Discovered: 1891
- Opened: 1899
- Closed: 1976
- Company: Granby Consolidated Mining, Smelting and Power Co.

Granby Consolidated Mining, Smelting and Power Co. was established by charter to operate in the Boundary region of southern British Columbia. Primarily involved in the mining and smelting of copper, the conglomerate became a publicly traded company. The various corporate operating names within the former group mostly specified the Granby identity.

== Formation ==
In 1891, Henry White and Matthew Hotter staked the Knob Hill and Old Ironsides claims respectively on what became known as Phoenix Mountain. In need of development capital, the two mines were incorporated as separate companies. In 1895, Jay Paul Graves, a Spokane-based financier, agreed to promote the venture for a quarter interest. He also purchased the adjoining Victoria and Fourth of July claims. When seeking venture capital in Montreal, Graves connected with S.H.C. Miner, president of the Quebec-based Granby Rubber Company and a director of the Eastern Townships Bank.

In 1897, the two companies were incorporated in Quebec, with White and Hotter exiting the following year. In 1899, Graves and Miner formed the Granby Consolidated Mining & Smelting Co., which bought the Fourth of July, Victoria, Aetna, and Phoenix claims. The pair jointly owned the Old Ironsides, the Knob Hill, and other Boundary properties. The Granby Consolidated directors were dubbed the Miner-Graves syndicate. The syndicate established the upper townsite at Phoenix. Ore had been stockpiled at the mines awaiting the arrival of the Canadian Pacific Railway (CP) line in May 1900. That July, the first trainload descended to the Granby smelter at Grand Forks, which commenced processing in August. Hydroelectricity plants on the Granby River (company one) and at Bonnington Falls supplied power.

In May 1901, a new BC charter, with wider powers, created the Granby Consolidated Mining, Smelting & Power Co., which absorbed the existing Granby Consolidated, Old Ironsides, Knob Hill, and other syndicate properties, while dissolving the syndicate.

== Operation ==
In 1901, the addition of two more furnaces increased daily capacity to 1,500 tons. By that time, the underground mining had changed to the room and pillar method to create stopes which avoided the extensive timbering associated with the square set method. In 1903, three small steam shovels worked surface operations producing half the mine's production, being one of the earliest attempts at open-pit mining in BC. Mine acquisitions and improvements included the Granby car, two giant steam shovels, two saddle tank steam locomotives, and bunkers and loading facilities for the Great Northern Railway (GN) line, which arrived in 1905. Gentler grades allowed heavier trains. Augmented by rate cutting, GN quickly replaced CP in hauling most of the mountain's ore. The blister copper produced by the smelter went to the Nichols Chemical Company in Brooklyn, New York for further refining.

In 1902, Miner divested his Granby interests. Graves in liaison with GN's James J. Hill sought control, but William H. Nichols acquired a majority interest in 1904. By 1906, the Knob Hill and the Old Ironsides workings joined underground to become a huge single network called the Granby mine, which spread into the Victoria claim that year. By 1908, Granby Consolidated owned 35 claims on the mountain, and smelter processing peaked at 1,178,853 tons, including ore from more distant mines. A narrow gauge railway moved ore throughout the smelter. On the mountain, the Curlew and the Gold Drop mines were acquired in 1909 and the Snowshoe in 1913. Augmented infrastructure increased daily capacity to 3,400 tons, creating the largest copper smelter in the British Empire and second largest in the world.

High copper prices during World War I prolonged the Phoenix operations. Mining ended in June 1919. By year end, the mine equipment was removed, the portals dynamited, and the railway tracks lifted.

== Map ==
- "Phoenix mines map". geography.ua.edu. 1911.

== Granby mine reactivated ==
In 1936, W.E. McArthur leased the mine, extracting from the old workings. After buying the property, he operated intermittently until 1946. Repurchased by the Granby company in 1955, open-pit mining began in 1959. Erecting a concentrator, Granby mined until 1976. Ore trucked across the border prolonged the plant operations a further two years.

== Other locations ==
At Anyox, Granby Consolidated operated a mine and smelter 1914–1936.

The Granby coalmine at Cassidy operated 1918–1932.

At a 1923 foreclosure sale, Allenby Copper Co., a Granby Consolidated affiliate, acquired the Canadian Copper Corporation mine on Copper Mountain. Ore shipping began in 1925, and Granby Consolidated and Allenby Copper merged the next year. Operations closed in 1930, reopened in 1937, and finally closed in 1957.

At the Granduc Mine, the Granby Mining Co. conducted exploration in 1952, but an unrelated joint venture undertook later development and operation.

Granisle Copper Co., a Granby Mining Co. subsidiary, operated an open pit 1966–1973.

== Name legacy ==
- Granby car is an employee-designed self-dumping ore car introduced in 1905. The fleet comprised twenty 10-ton steel cars.
- Granby River and Granby Provincial Park on the upper reaches.
- Granisle, a former mining town on Babine Lake, derived from subsidiary Granisle Copper.
- Granby Point, Granby Bay, and the Granby Peninsula, near Anyox on Observatory Inlet.
