= Anyox =

Ghost town in British Columbia, Canada

Coordinates: 55.417°N 129.833°W

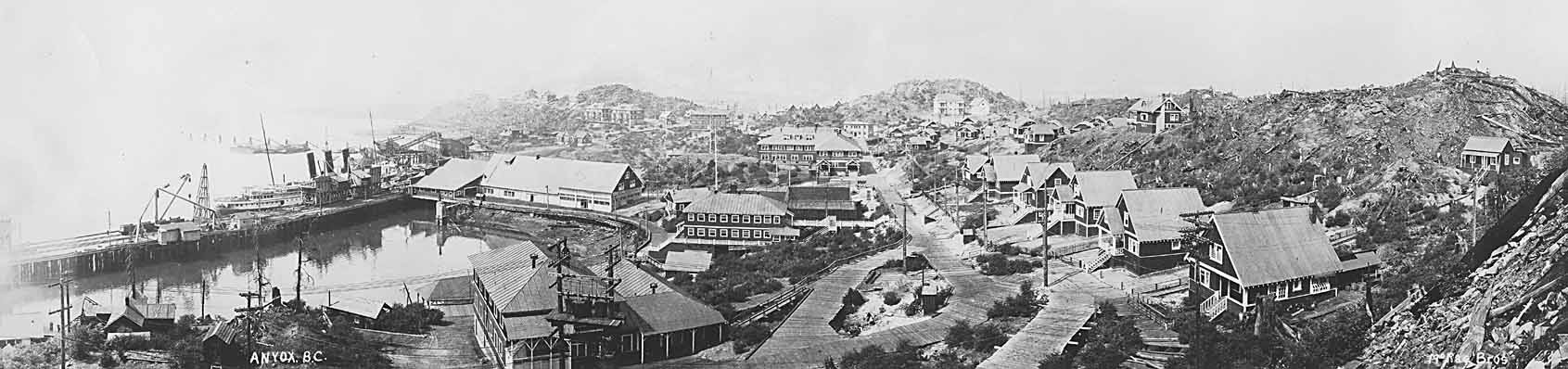
Anyox, British Columbia in 1911

Anyox was a small company-owned mining town in British Columbia, Canada. Today it is a ghost town, abandoned and largely destroyed. It is located on the shores of Granby Bay in coastal Observatory Inlet, about 60 kilometres (37 miles) south of (but without a land link to) Stewart, British Columbia, and about 20 kilometres (12 miles), across wilderness east of the tip of the Alaska Panhandle.

== Early history ==
The remote valley was long a hunting and trapping area for the Nisga'a, and the name Anyox means “hidden waters” in the Nisga'a language. The first Europeans in the area were the members of the Vancouver Expedition, who surveyed the inlet in 1793.

Nisga'a legends told of a mountain of gold, attracting speculators for years. In 1910, the Granby Consolidated Mining, Smelting and Power Company (Granby Consolidated) started buying land in the area. They soon found gold.

== Town and mines ==
Granby Consolidated started construction of the town in 1912. By 1914, Anyox had grown to a population of almost 3,000 residents, as the mine and smelter were put into full operation; rich lodes of copper and other precious metals were mined from the nearby mountains. Granby Consolidated moved its copper mining interests here from Phoenix, British Columbia. Copper was mined from the Hidden Creek and Bonanza deposits and smelted on site. Coal to fuel the smelter was shipped from the company built and owned town of Union Bay on Vancouver Island and Fernie in southeastern British Columbia.

Anyox had no rail or road links to the rest of British Columbia, and all connections were served by ocean steamers, which traveled to Prince Rupert (145 km (90 mi) southwest) and Vancouver.

The company town was a very large operation, with onsite railways, machine shops, curling rink, golf course and a hospital. In the spring of 1918, Granby Consolidated built the first wooden tennis court in Canada for additional recreation. The same year, incoming ships brought the Spanish flu epidemic to Anyox. Charles Clarkson Rhodes, the Chief Accountant for the Granby Consolidated operations in Anyox, died on October 29, 1918, while he was helping to treat patients in the Anyox Hospital. Dozens of workers and residents of Anyox died from the flu epidemic.

In the early 1920s, the concrete pioneer and dam engineer John S. Eastwood designed a hydroelectric dam, which, at 156 feet (48 m) high, was the tallest dam in Canada for many years. Anyox was partially destroyed by forest fires in 1923, but the townsite was rebuilt, and mining operations continued. Acid rain from the smelter denuded trees on nearby hillsides, which became bare.

The Great Depression drove down the demand for copper. This was effectively the beginning of the end for Anyox. Operations continued but were steadily scaled down while the company stockpiled 100,000,000 pounds (45,000 tonnes) of copper, three years of production, which it was unable to sell. The mine shut down in 1935, and the town was abandoned. Salvage operations in the 1940s removed most machinery and steel from the town, and two forest fires, in 1942 and 1943, burned all of the remaining wood structures.

During its 25 year existence, Anyox's mines and smelters produced 140,000 ounces (4 tonnes) of gold, 8,000,000 ounces (230 tonnes) of silver and 760,000,000 pounds (340,000 tonnes) of copper.

== Ongoing developments ==
Active mineral exploration continues in the area. In the 1980s, local entrepreneurs teamed with Vancouver investors to purchase the long dormant operations from the owner of record. Whenever there is a rise in the price of copper, there is speculation about the possibility of re-development, but none has ever occurred.

Since 2000, the current owners have been trying to attract interest in rehabilitating the hydroelectric dam to supply the British Columbia grid or to attract and serve an on-site natural gas liquefaction facility.

The town was the subject of the 2022 documentary film Anyox.

== Notable residents ==
Former Vancouver Mayor Jack Volrich was one of the 351 people born in Anyox, as was Thomas Waterland, MLA for Yale-Lillooet from 1975 to 1986.

Reid Mitchell, who represented Canada in basketball at the 1948 Olympics, was also born in Anyox.

Denny Boyd, a Vancouver Sun reporter and Order of British Columbia recipient.

== See also ==
- Kitsault
