= Ksyen Regional Hospital =

Public hospital in Terrace, British Columbia, Canada

- Northern Health
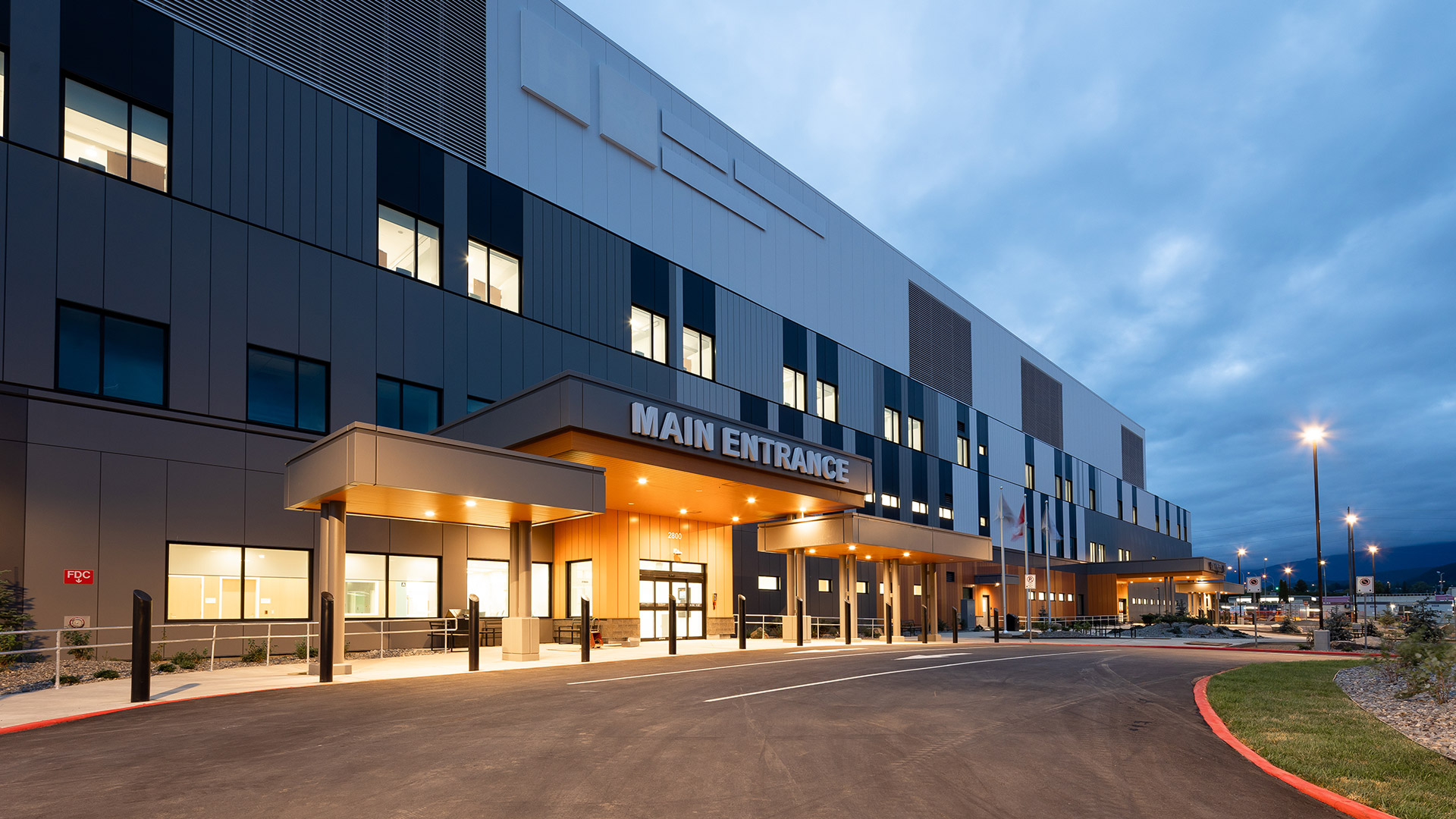
- Main entrance of Ksyen Regional Hospital, formerly known as Mills Memorial Hospital, in Terrace, British Columbia, at night

- Location in British Columbia

Geography
- Location: 2800 Tetrault Street; Terrace, British Columbia; V8G 2W8
- Coordinates: 54.5104°N 128.5961°W

Organisation
- Care system: Medicare
- Type: General
- Affiliated university: University of British Columbia, University of Northern British Columbia, Northern Medical Program

Services
- Emergency department: Yes, Level III trauma centre
- Beds: 78

Helipads
- Helipad: No

History
- Former names: Mills Memorial Hospital; Terrace and District Hospital
- Constructed: 2021
- Founded: 2024

Links
- Website: https://www.northernhealth.ca/find-a-facility/hospitals/ksyen-regional-hospital

Ksyen Regional Hospital, formerly Mills Memorial Hospital, is a 78-bed regional medical facility located in Terrace, British Columbia. It serves as the primary healthcare hub for northwestern British Columbia, including communities in the Nass Valley (Aiyansh and New Aiyansh, now Gitlax̱t’aamiks; Canyon City, now Gitwinksihlkw; Greenville, now Lax̱g̱alts’ap; and Kincolith, now Ging̱olx), the unincorporated community of Thornhill, and others. The hospital, currently operated by Northern Health, offers a range of acute care services and acts as a referral centre for more specialized treatments. A new, significantly larger and more modern hospital building officially started construction in 2021, and opened to the general public on November 24, 2024.

== History ==
=== Early healthcare in Terrace ===
Healthcare in Terrace began informally with Tsimshian people utilizing the nearby Lakelse Hot Springs as a natural healing site. With the construction of the Grand Trunk Pacific Railway in the early 1900s, physicians like Dr. W.P. Johns and Dr. Seymour Traynor provided basic medical services, often traveling by canoe. Early medical care was delivered in makeshift facilities such as homes, hotels, and temporary structures.

=== Founding of Mills Memorial Hospital ===
The need for a formal hospital became apparent during the 1936 Skeena River flood and the Second World War. Dr. Stanley Gordon Mills, a decorated veteran of the First World War and a pioneer in Terrace’s healthcare, was instrumental in advocating for a proper hospital. In 1948, the Red Cross opened a 10-bed outpost hospital in Terrace, marking the first significant step toward establishing modern medical infrastructure.

=== Post-war expansion and advocacy ===
By the 1950s, population growth and increased healthcare demands led to the formation of the Skeena Hospital Improvement District. Through the collective efforts of local advocates, including Dr. Mills, George Little, and Bert Goulet, land was secured, and funding was raised for a larger, purpose-built hospital. Construction began in 1960, and the new facility, then called the Terrace and District Hospital, officially opened in 1961.

=== Naming of Mills Memorial Hospital ===
In 1962, the hospital was renamed Mills Memorial Hospital to honour Dr. Stanley Gordon Mills and his wife, Edith Mills, who both tragically died in a house fire shortly after the hospital’s opening. Dr. Mills had spent decades advocating for improved healthcare facilities, and Edith had been head nurse at the new hospital. Their gravestone in Kitsumgallum (Kitsumkalum) Cemetery poignantly reads, “Life’s Work Well Done.”

=== Modern era ===
==== Upgrades and expansions ====
Mills Memorial Hospital has undergone several expansions since its opening, including:

- A $1.2 million expansion in 1968, adding an intensive care unit and more beds.
- A $6.3 million renovation in 1977, upgrading most departments.

Despite these upgrades, the facility has struggled to meet modern healthcare standards due to aging infrastructure and increasing demand.

==== Redevelopment ====
In 2019, a project to replace the existing Mills Memorial Hospital was announced. Construction of the new facility began in 2021, and it officially opened its doors to the public on November 24, 2024. The new facility, spanning approximately 356,500 square feet and featuring 78 beds, is nearly twice the size of the current hospital. Designed as a regional healthcare hub, the upgraded hospital provides expanded trauma services, orthopedic surgeries, pathology, radiology, and pharmacy services.

Additionally, the new hospital aims to enhance healthcare delivery in northwest British Columbia and address staffing challenges by improving working conditions and supporting medical education. It will continue to serve as a training site for medical students through the Northern Medical Program, a partnership between the University of British Columbia (UBC) and the University of Northern British Columbia (UNBC).

==== Renaming to Ksyen Regional Hospital ====
In early November 2024, Northern Health announced that the new facility would be renamed Ksyen Regional Hospital. The name “Ksyen” is derived from the Tsimshian language and refers to the Skeena River, an important cultural and ecological feature of the region. The renaming reflects efforts to acknowledge the Indigenous heritage of northwest British Columbia and align the hospital’s identity with the local history and traditions of the area.

==== Community involvement ====
Ksyen Regional Hospital, formerly Mills Memorial Hospital, has historically been supported by community initiatives, from early grassroots fundraising efforts to the current advocacy for improved healthcare. Volunteer organizations, such as the Dr. REM Lee Foundation, and auxiliary groups, such as the Mills Memorial Hospital Auxiliary, continue to play a vital role in supporting hospital operations.

== Amenities ==
- Emergency services
- Laboratory and radiology (x-ray) services
- Obstetrical care
- Outpatient ambulatory-care procedures
- Renal services and hemodialysis unit
- Mammography screening program
- A 20-bed psychiatric unit
