= Ni'isjoohl totem pole =

Nisga'a totem pole

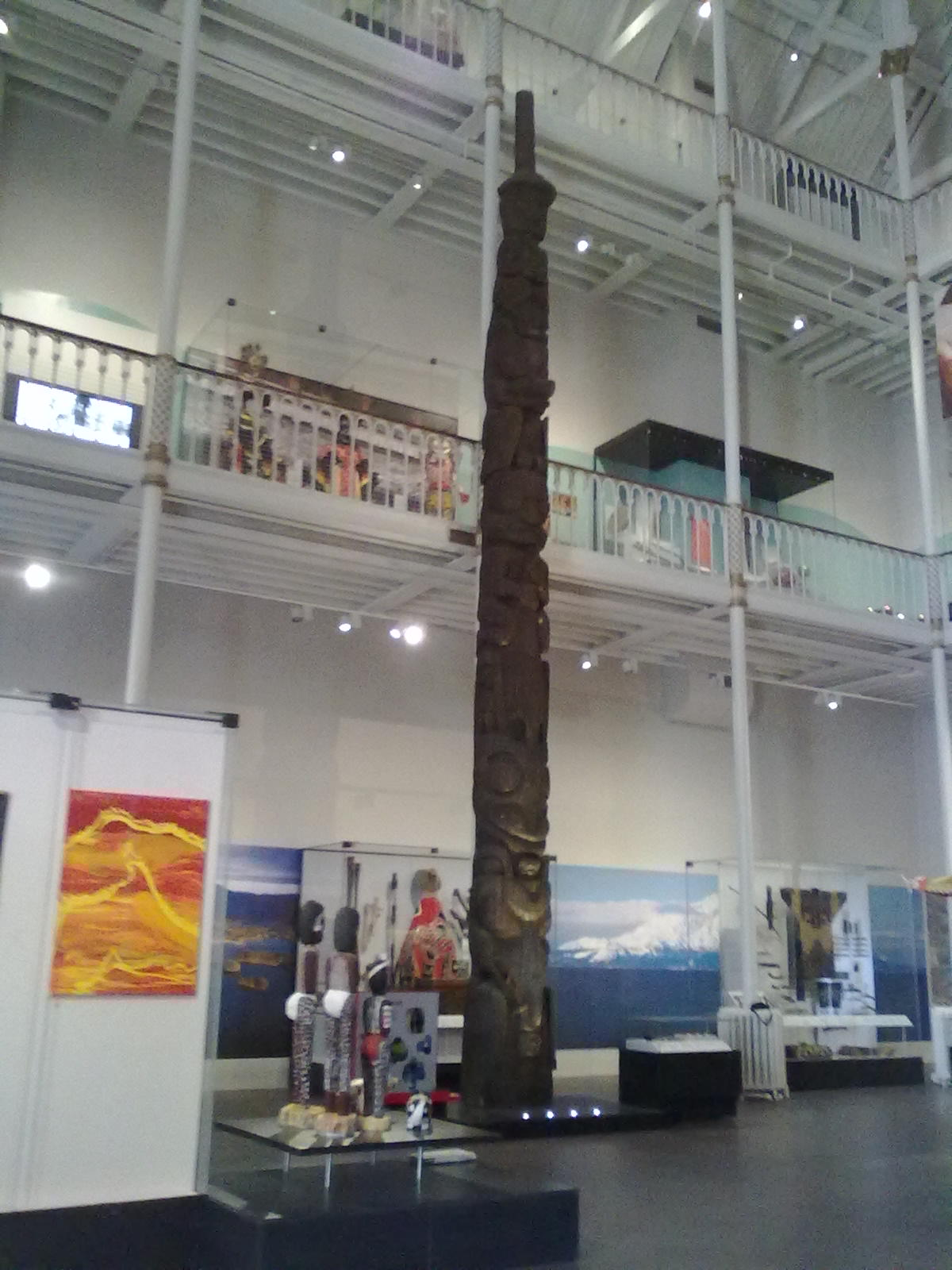
- The pole located within the National Museum of Scotland
- Type: Totem pole
- Material: Pacific red cedar
- Height: 36 feet (11 m)
- Created: c. 1860
- Culture: Nisga'a

The Ni'isjoohl totem pole is a memorial pole created and owned by the Nisga'a people of British Columbia, Canada. The pole had been held in the National Museum of Scotland and its predecessors for almost a century before being returned to the Nisga'a Nation. It is held by the Nisg̱aʼa Museum in Lax̱g̱alts'ap.

Commissioned in the 19th century by a member of the House of Ni'isjoohl, the pole was removed to Scotland in the 1920s by Canadian ethnographer Marius Barbeau at the request of the Royal Museum of Scotland in Edinburgh. While efforts had been made to facilitate its return, the National Museum of Scotland did not agree to return the pole until 2022. The following summer, the removal began, and the pole arrived in Lax̱g̱alts'ap in September 2023.

The pole is the second in Europe to be returned to its Indigenous creators in Canada, following the return of the G'psgolox totem pole at the Swedish Museum of Ethnography in 2006.

== Background ==
The Nisga'a are an Indigenous people currently centred in the Nass River valley of British Columbia, Canada. In 2000, the Nisga'a Final Agreement came into effect, legitimising their land ownership and giving them the right to self-governance. It was the first agreement which also included a provision for the return of ancestral objects from Canadian museums and saw the creation of the Nisg̱a'a Museum in 2011 to house the items.

The Nisga'a Nation created totem poles to record traditional stories and histories known as adaawak, giving the poles cultural importance as family treasures and constitutional devices. Indigenous scholar Amy Parent (also known as Sigidimnak' Nox̱s Ts'aawit) referred to the Ni'isjoohl pole itself as "a living constitutional and visual archive".

In 2021, National Museums Scotland, the government body which runs the National Museum of Scotland, announced it would be reversing its decision to refuse the return of colonial-era objects.

== History ==
=== Origin and description ===
In the 1860s, master carver Oyea Tait of Gitwinksihlkw was commissioned by Joanna Moody (known as 'Ntsitskaos, or "Grandmother-scalp"), a member of the House of Ni'isjoohl living in Ank'idaa (also spelled Angyada), to create the pole. It was created as a memorial to Ts'wawit, a warrior who was next in line to be chief after Neestsawl of the Ganada (Raven) family, but was killed in conflict with the Tsimshian people. The majority of the pole is carved from a single piece of pacific red cedar, apart from a removable cap at the top, and it stands at 36 feet (11 m) tall.

Robert Kerr of the Royal Scottish Museum gave the pole two names, the first being Hlkwarœt ("Small hat") after the removal cap, and the second being Masrayait ("White bullhead") from the fish represented on it. He lists the following figures on the pole from top to bottom:

- Hlkwarœt, the ceremonial hat which was a crest of some families.
- Towedstsatukt, the figure wearing the hat. A Kwakiutl ancestor who travelled from Wedstae village, south of the Skeena River, to the Nass Valley.
- The raven, the main emblem of the Ganada family.
- A human figure of an unknown ancestor.
- Masrayait, the white bullhead and a key emblem of the family.
- Another representation of the raven.

The information was given to the museum by Marius Barbeau, the ethnographer at the National Museum of Canada who removed the pole from the Nisga'a lands. His key source was Joanna Moody's husband, Lazarus Moody, who had previously accompanied artist Emily Carr on her tour of the area.

=== Removal to Scotland ===
In 1927, Marius Barbeau began touring the Nass Valley and taking photographs of totem poles he encountered. In 1929, the Royal Scottish Museum (now the National Museum of Scotland) paid Barbeau between 400 and 600 Canadian dollars to acquire the pole. During that summer, Barbeau stole several poles from the Nisga'a Nation while most people were absent during hunting and fishing season. The pole arrived in Scotland in 1930.

=== Negotiations ===
In 1991, a Nisga'a delegation visited Scotland and requested the return of the pole. They were informed that it was too fragile to be moved, however, it was later relocated during museum renovations.

In 2019, Indigenous scholar Amy Parent was asked by Nisga'a nation leaders to research the Ni'isjoohl pole in order for the Lax̱g̱altsʼap community to build an accurate replica. She then began involvement in efforts to have the pole returned to the Nisga'a Nation, her ancestor having commissioned it originally. In 2020, she developed a research project titled "Raising Nisga'a Language, Sovereignty, and Land-based Education Through Traditional Carving Knowledge" to research Nisga'a pole carving and secure the return of the pole. It secured $250,000 in funding from the Social Sciences and Humanities Research Council's New Frontiers in Research fund. In April 2021, Parent gave a talk at Simon Fraser University's Research Centre for Scottish Studies on the project.

On 9 August 2022, the Nisga'a Nation announced that a delegation would visit the National Museum of Scotland in Edinburgh to discuss the repatriation of the Ni'isjoohl pole. The delegation, including House of Ni'isjoohl members Amy Parent and Chief Earl Stephens (also known as Sim'oogit Ni'isjoohl), met with staff of the National Museum. The groups clashed over the Nisga'a ceremony of feeding the pole, as food is forbidden on the museum floor, but were able to agree to use vacuum-packed food instead. An official request was then made by the Nisga'a to return the pole. On 1 December, the Scottish government body National Museums Scotland formally agreed to return the pole, and it was subsequently approved by Angus Robertson, the Scottish Cabinet Secretary in charge of culture and external affairs. Members of the Nisga'a delegation praised the decision.

In July 2023, Parent and members of the repatriation team were awarded Awards of Merit from the British Columbia Historical Federation for promoting British Columbia history.

=== Return to the Nisga'a ===
On 28 August 2023, members of the Nisga'a held a ceremony next to the Ni'isjoohl pole. Scaffolding was then erected around the pole to prepare it for removal. Following its removal from the museum, the pole was transported by the Royal Canadian Air Force to British Columbia. It was then driven in procession to Lax̱g̱alts'ap village, where it is now housed at the Nisga'a Museum. A public ceremony to celebrate its arrival was held on 29 September, and it will be available to view in October.
