= Nisgaʼa Elementary Secondary School =

Nisga'a Elementary Secondary School (NESS)

Location
- Box 239, 5000 Skateen Ave. Gitlaxt'aamiks, British Columbia, V0J 1A0; Canada
- Coordinates: 55.2050°N 129.0724°W

Information
- School type: Public, K-12 school
- School board: School District 92 Nisga'a
- Principal: Mark Koebel
- Staff: 35+
- Grades: K-12
- Enrollment: 240 (approx.)
- Language: English, Nisga'a
- Colours: Red, White, Black
- Team name: Nighthawks
- Website: ness.nisgaa.bc.ca

Nisga'a Elementary Secondary School (NESS) is a public K-12 school in Gitlaxt'aamiks, British Columbia, Canada. NESS is operated by School District 92 Nisga'a. It is the elementary school for Gitlaxt'aamiks as well as the designated secondary school for the area of the Nisga'a people in the Nass Valley, including the communities of Gitlaxt'aamiks (New Aiyansh), Gitwinksihlkw (Canyon City), Laxgalts'ap (Greenville), Gingolx (Kincolith), and surrounding settlements. Secondary grades-level students from outside of Gitlaxt'aamiks are bussed to the school each day.

In 2010 ninety-eight percent (98%) of students in the district were First Nations, primarily Nisga’a and others from northwestern British Columbia. In 2010–2011, 36.4% were classified as English as a second language (ESL) students.

In addition to core academic and physical education subjects, NESS offers courses in special education and in the Nisga'a language.

Since 2002, a high percentage of students have not met the school district's academic targets. Missed targets are in key areas such as mathematics, language, and school completion. In the 2001–2011 academic years, 50.1% of NESS students graduated. To address these problems, the school district announced in June, 2012 a district-wide restructuring. This will see NESS transform from serving students in K-12 to serving K-6 and grade 9–12, grade 7-8 classes will move to Laxgalts’ap, and more classes will be single-grade.
