= Ksi Gingolx =

River in British Columbia

Ksi Gingolx Kincolith River
- Mouth of Ksi Gingolx

Location
- Country: Canada
- Province: British Columbia
- District: Cassiar Land District

Physical characteristics
- Source: Boundary Ranges
  - location: Coast Mountains
  - coordinates: 55°12′44″N 129°32′3″W
  - elevation: 1,188 m (3,898 ft)
- Mouth: Nass River
  - location: Ging̱olx
  - coordinates: 54°59′45″N 129°57′44″W
  - elevation: 0 m (0 ft)
- Length: 45 km (28 mi)
- Basin size: 224 km^{2} (86 sq mi),
- Discharge
  - average: 22.2 m^{3}/s (780 cu ft/s)

Basin features
- Topo map: NTS103I13 Kincolith

Ksi Gingolx (English pronunciation: say-gin-GOL), formerly the Kincolith River, is a river in the northern coast part of the province of British Columbia, Canada. From its source in the Boundary Ranges of the Coast Mountains Ksi Gingolx flows southwest for about 45 km (28 mi) to the Nisga'a village of Ging̱olx, where it empties into the lowermost Nass River at Nass Bay.

Ksi Gingolx's drainage basin covers 224 km^{2} (86 sq mi). The river's mean annual discharge is estimated at 22.2 m^{3}/s (780 cu ft/s), with the majority of flow occurring between May and October. Ksi Gingolx's watershed's land cover is classified as 38.8% conifer forest, 26.9% barren, 11.4% snow/glacier, and small amounts of other cover. The mouth of Ksi Gingolx is located about 80 km (50 mi) north of Prince Rupert, about 115 km (71 mi) east of Ketchikan, Alaska, about 430 km (270 mi) west of Prince George, and about 490 km (300 mi) north of Vancouver.

The entire Ksi Gingolx watershed is within the territory of the Nisga'a Nation as defined by the Nisga'a Treaty.

The river's name has two parts in the Nisga'a language. "Ksi" means "river" or "drainage basin". "Gingolx" means "place of scalps", referring to a display of scalps after a historical battle between the Nisga'a and Haida raiders.

== Geography ==
Ksi Gingolx begins in the high peaks and glaciers of the Boundary Ranges of the Coast Mountains between the Nass River and Nass Bay to the south, and Portland Inlet and Observatory Inlet to the west. Its upper watershed lies just south of the Ksi xts'at'kw/Stagoo Conservancy. High mountains around and in the river's watershed include Mount Francis, Mount Woods, and Mount Tomlinson. Along its route Ksi Gingolx collects various small tributary streams flowing from highlands down into its valley.

In its lower reach, about 4 km (2.5 mi) upriver from its mouth, Ksi Gingolx flows through an area known as "Mission Valley", referring to the historic Kincolith Mission. The Nisga'a village of Ging̱olx is located at the mouth of Ksi Gingolx. Ging̱olx is also the western end of the Nisga'a Highway (British Columbia Highway 113). "Kincolith" is an Anglicization of the Nisga'a name "Ging̱olx".

== History ==
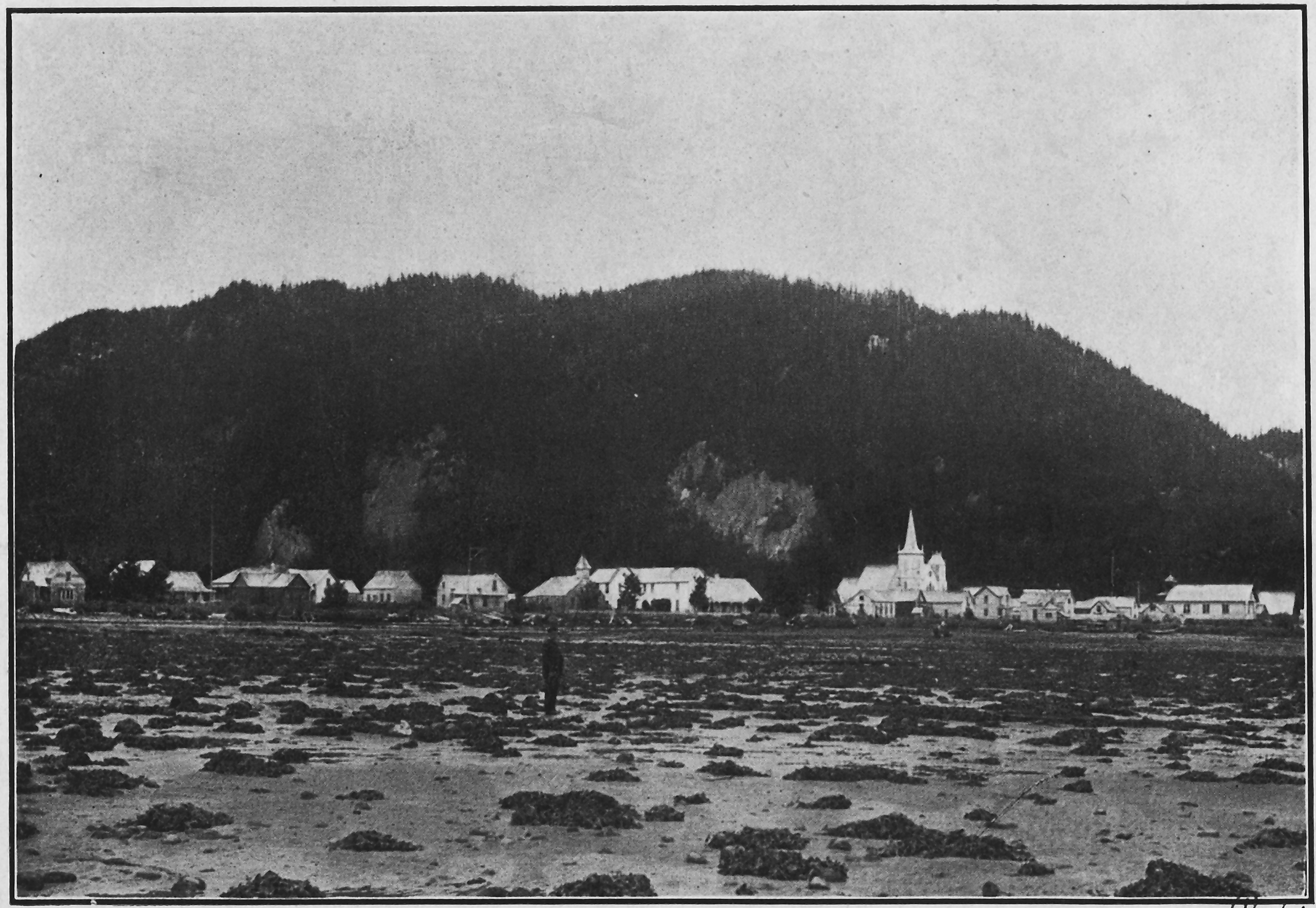
Old photo of the Kincolith Mission on the shore of the Nass River estuary at the mouth of Ksi Gingolx

The Nisga'a have lived in the lower Nass River region since time immemorial.

According to the Gingolx Village Government, the word "Gingolx" is Nisga'a for "place of scalps", described as "a historic warning to would-be conquerors that the Gingolx people are determined to protect their land, resources, and way of life." According to British Columbia Geographic Names, the Nisga'a word "Gingolx" (also spelled "Ging̱olx") refers to a historic battle between the Nisga'a and the Haida. After the battle scalps of the defeated Haida were hung on poles and displayed on a rocky bluff near the mouth of the river, as a warning against further raids. The gin- of "Gingolx" means "to feed or present" or simply "place of", and the -golx part means "scalp". The site and the lower river had been clan resource territory belonging to the Gisḵ’aast tribe or "clan" (phratry), but later the resource rights were transferred to the village. The Nass River, especially near its mouth where Ksi Gingolx is, was historically very important as a food source, especially for eulachon fish. For this reason the lower Nass region was sometimes subjected to raids from various bands of Tsimshian, Haida, and Tlingit peoples.

The Kincolith Mission was established near the mouth of Ksi Gingolx in 1867 by Nisga'a Christians, the Anglican missionary Robert Tomlinson, and Robert A. Doolan, both members of the Church Mission Society. They had intended the mission to be at Dogfish Bight but the party was not able to cross Portland Inlet and stopped at the mouth of Ksi Gingolx instead.

The river was officially given the name "Kincolith Creek" by the government of British Columbia in 1930, then changed to "Kincolith River" in 1953. Per the Nisga'a Treaty, its name was officially changed to "Ksi Gingolx" on 11 May 2000.

== Flora and fauna ==
Like the Ksi xts'at'kw/Stagoo Conservancy just to the north, the Ksi Gingolx watershed contains fauna typical of the northern coast of British Columbia, including grizzly bears, black bears, deer, mountain goats, wolves, and moose.

The primary biogeoclimatic zone of the Ksi Gingolx watershed is "Coastal Western Hemlock" (CWH) zone, a conifer temperate rainforest dominated by western hemlock, western red cedar, and amabilis fir. At higher altitudes this zone merges into the "Mountain Hemlock" (MH) zone, characterized by the presence of mountain hemlock and the absence of red cedar.

Ksi Gingolx is a major salmon-bearing river.

== See also ==
- List of rivers of British Columbia
