= William Collison =

Irish Anglican missionary

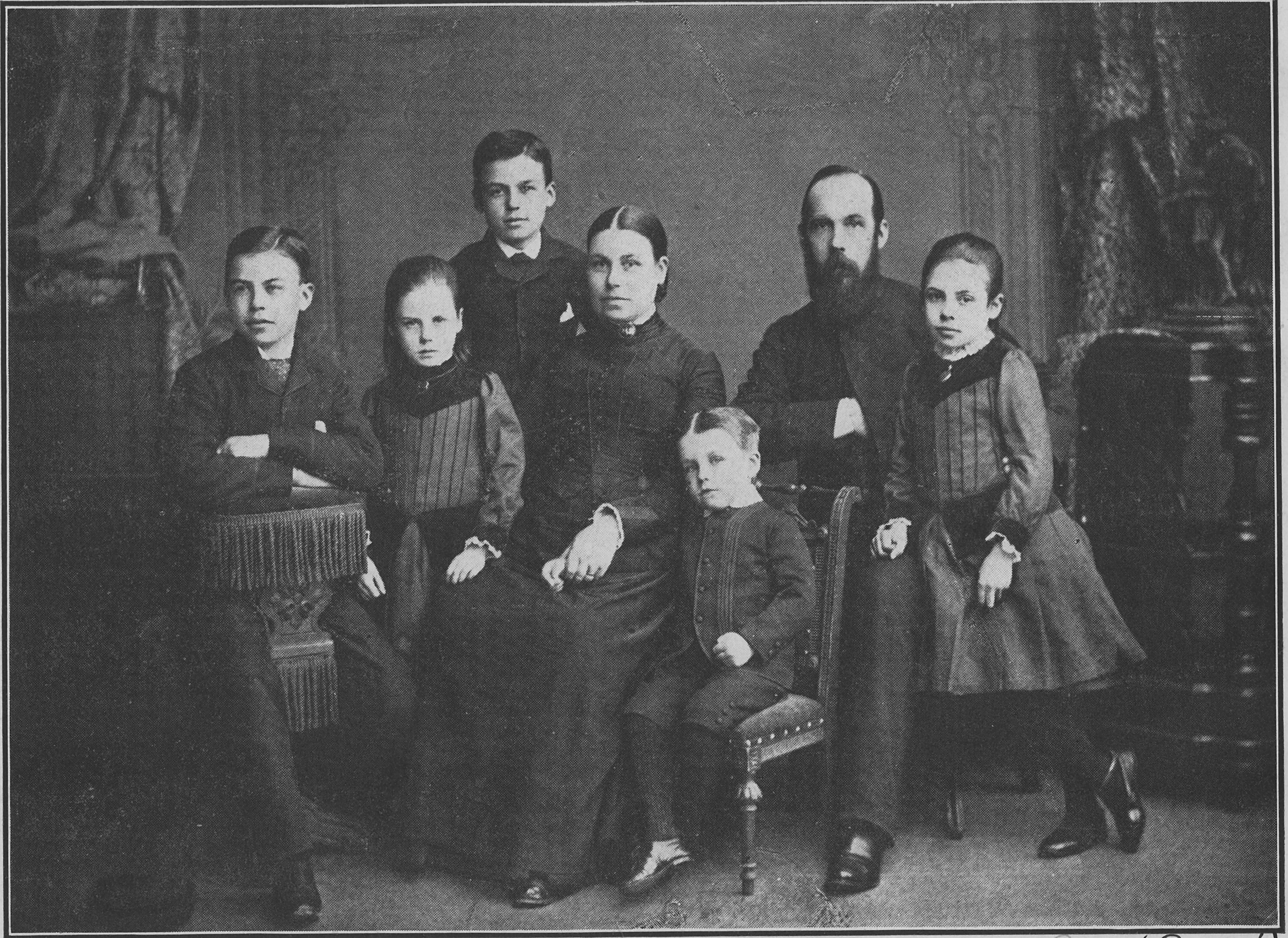
W.H. Collison and family circa 1890

William Henry Collison (1847–1922), also known as W. H. Collison, was an Anglican missionary among First Nations people in coastal British Columbia, Canada.

== Life ==
William Collison was born 12 November 1847 in County Armagh, Ireland. After first apprenticing as a warehouseman, he attended the Church of Ireland Normal College, after which he served as the superintendent of the Buckingham House Free School for Boys in Cork, Ireland. After three years there, in 1872 he applied to the Church Missionary Society (CMS) to be accepted into their missionary program, and then for a year attended the Church Missionary Society College, Islington.

In August 1873, he married Marion M. Goodwin who had served as a deaconess, nursing the wounded in the Franco-Prussian War. They were wed at St. Paul's, Tottenham, in London, and left for North America soon after their marriage.

After his training Collison was appointed by the Church Missionary Society to Metlakatla, British Columbia, to assist William Duncan in converting the Tsimshian people. Marion Collison became the first white woman to be resident in that community. Their first child, a son (William Edwin), was the first white child born there, as was a second son (Henry Alexander).

After teaching and preaching at Metlakatla, as well as becoming fluent in the Tsimshian language, he accepted an invitation by the Haida chief, Albert Edward Edenshaw, to set up a mission in Haida Gwaii. He later became good friends with Chief Edenshaw. In 1876 he became the first missionary to work among the Haida people on the nearby islands of Haida Gwaii. Their first daughter, Emily Charlotte, was born at Massett on Haida Gwaii.

Collison was ordained at Metlakatla in 1879, by Bishop William Bompas who had travelled overland from Red River for this purpose.

Collison returned to Metlakatla in 1879 to take the part of the CMS when it became involved in a controversy with Duncan. After several years of acrimony, in which Duncan sought to establish his mission there as an independent church, out of the control of the CMS, Duncan removed to Annette Island in Alaska with some 850 followers, and set up New Metlakatla. Approximately 400 villagers who had remained faithful to the church, stayed in Metlakatla.

In 1881 Collison began work among the Gitxsan, up the Skeena River from the Tsimshian. He founded the first mission at Hazelton, B.C., in Gitxsan territory.

In 1891 he became Archdeacon of Metlakatla, and from 1893 to 1894 he served as secretary for the CMS's northern B.C. mission.

In the early 1890s he and his family moved to Kincolith, a Nisga'a village on the Nass River in northern B.C., founded as an Anglican mission by the medical missionary Robert Tomlinson. Collison remained there until his death on 23 January 1922.

Collison is best remembered for his vivid 1915 memoir In the Wake of the War Canoe, which contains numerous ethnological insights, including information on the nearly extinct Tsetsaut people, remnants of whom lived at Kincolith.

== Works cited ==
- Murray, Peter (1985). The Devil and Mr. Duncan : a History of the Two Metlakatlas. Victoria, British Columbia: Sono Nis Press. ISBN 978-0-919203-93-8.
- Tomalin, Marcus (1 November 2007). ""My Close Application to the Language": William Henry Collison and Nineteenth-Century Haida Linguistics". BC Studies (155): 93–128. doi:10.14288/bcs.v0i155.631.
- Tomalin, Marcus (2011). And He Knew Our Language: Missionary Linguistics on the Pacific Northwest Coast. Amsterdam/Philadelphia: John Benjamins Publishing Company. ISBN 978-90-272-8683-3.
