= Architects Against Housing Alienation =

Architects Against Housing Alienation (AAHA) is a Canadian collective that brings together architects, urban planners, activists, and advocates from across the country. The collective’s primary focus is to address housing injustice and challenge the systemic issues that underlie Canada’s housing crisis. Their mission is to confront the financialization of housing and advocate for transformative change, aiming to dismantle the profit-driven model that currently dominates the housing sector.

In 2023, the collective occupied the Canadian Pavilion at the Venice Biennale of Architecture with the campaign Not for Sale!, which called for an end to housing alienation in Canada. The project was commissioned by the Canada Council for the Arts.

== Formation ==
The collective was founded in 2021 by Adrian Blackwell, David Fortin, Matthew Soules, Sara Stevens, Sim'oogit Saa-Bax Patrick Reid Stewart, and Tijana Vujosevic. The University of British Columbia School of Architecture and Landscape Architecture serves as the lead organization for the project, in partnership with the University of Waterloo School of Architecture.

Ten teams, based in locations across Canada and comprising over 80 members, are divided into individual roles based on the group's guiding principles. These teams have worked to establish the campaign’s demands and manifesto, in correlation with the Not for Sale! project, and continue to develop new proposals that call for policy change and advocate for housing justice. Team members include activists, architects, and advocates from a variety of backgrounds.

A number of professionals serve on the Organizing Committee, and as Campaign Collaborators, and include educators, artists, curators, graphic designers, web designers, campaign strategists, community organizers, writers, documentarians, film and video creators, and more. As a group, they bring together expertise and establish an interconnected network across a range of organizations and institutions.

The collective's formation was driven by a shared concern over the increasing alienation caused by current housing systems, namely in Canada's metropolitan areas, and a commitment to reimagining housing as a fundamental human right rather than a commodity. The group was created with 10 primary demands that serve as their guiding statements. These demands are as follows:

- Land Back: Land claimed by the Crown be reinstated to First Nations Communities
- On the Land Housing: Off-grid communities for Indigenous women and girls with 24/7 support services
- First Nations Home Building Lodges: Housing built for the Indigenous population that aligns with their beliefs and history
- Reparative Architecture: in communities affected by gentrification
- A Gentrification Tax
- Surplus Properties for Housing: Surplus property assets, which are unlisted, for the creation of affordable housing
- Intentional Communities for Unhoused People: Use of underutilized land for shelters and/or other affordable housing units
- Collective Ownership: Municipal bylaw reform to promote cooperative housing
- Mutual Aid Housing: in high-density residential areas
- Ambient Ecosystems Commons: Housing that will not affect the livelihood of surrounding wildlife and ecosystems

== Public works ==
AAHA was selected from among four finalists, through a national juried competition by the Canada Council for the Arts, to present an exhibit at the Venice Biennale of Architecture. AAHA presented their exhibit Not For Sale! at the Canadian Pavilion in the Venice Giardini.

In an introductory statement for the Biennale, curator Lesley Lokko pointed out ongoing issues of incompleteness and erasure in the history of architecture. Lokko observed that "the dominant voice has historically been a singular, exclusive voice, whose reach and power ignores huge swathes of humanity – financially, creatively, [and] conceptually. [...] The ‘story’ of architecture is therefore incomplete."

Elizabeth Pagliacolo, editor at Azure magazine, further applied this analogy of erasure to AAHA's wrapping of the Canadian Pavilion during its occupation of the space. The pavilion was wrapped in a tent-like structure, featuring images of actual tents from urban encampments in Canada, symbolizing the pressing issue of homelessness in Canada. Pagliacolo noted that this “obscure[d]” the pavilion’s name and its exterior physical appearance. By hiding the physical structure of the building, the wrapping subsequently exposed an urgent situation: the housing crisis in c\a\n\a\d\a.

The inside of the pavilion, which served as AAHA's campaign headquarters, was filled with visual and textual documentation, including banners of the collective's ten-point demands, which were hung from the pavilion mezzanine, along with slogans and blocks of texts on blankets, bedsheets, and curtains; publications, to-do memos on sticky notes, and architectural renderings, models, and charts. The Banners for Fugitives were created by installation and performance artist Grey Piitaapan Muldoon while a documentary film, titled Atlas of Housing Alienation, was produced by multidisciplinary video creator Marie-Espérance Cerda.

Since the Biennale, AAHA has continued to exhibit some of the visual and material culture that was installed in the Canadian Pavilion.

Beyond their international endeavors, AAHA actively partners with local groups across Canada. These partnerships aim to develop housing solutions that are socially equitable, ecologically sustainable, and creatively empowering, challenging the prevailing market-driven approach to housing.

== Reception ==
The "Not for Sale!" campaign garnered significant attention for its critique of housing commodification and its innovative transformation of the Canada Pavilion. They used the Venice Biennale as an opportunity to advocate for housing as an essential human right and called for systemic changes in Canadian housing policy. The campaign was recognized for presenting one of the most progressive visions for housing reform, highlighting the ongoing housing crisis in Canada and its roots in real estate speculation.

== Exhibitions ==
- 2025: Town + Country: Narratives of Property and Capital, at the Morris and Helen Belkin Art Gallery in Vancouver, British Columbia. Curated by Caitlin Jones, Charo Neville and Melanie O’Brian.
- 2024: Town + Country: Narratives of Property and Capital, at the Kamloops Art Gallery in Kamloops, British Columbia.
- 2023: Not for Sale!, at the Canadian Pavilion of the Venice Biennale of Architecture in Venice, Italy. Curated by Matthew Soules, Sara Stevens, Tijana Vujosevic, David Fortin, Adrian Blackwell, and, Sim'oogit Saa-Bax Patrick Reid Stewart.
