= Robert Tomlinson (missionary) =

Irish Anglican medical missionary (1842–1913)

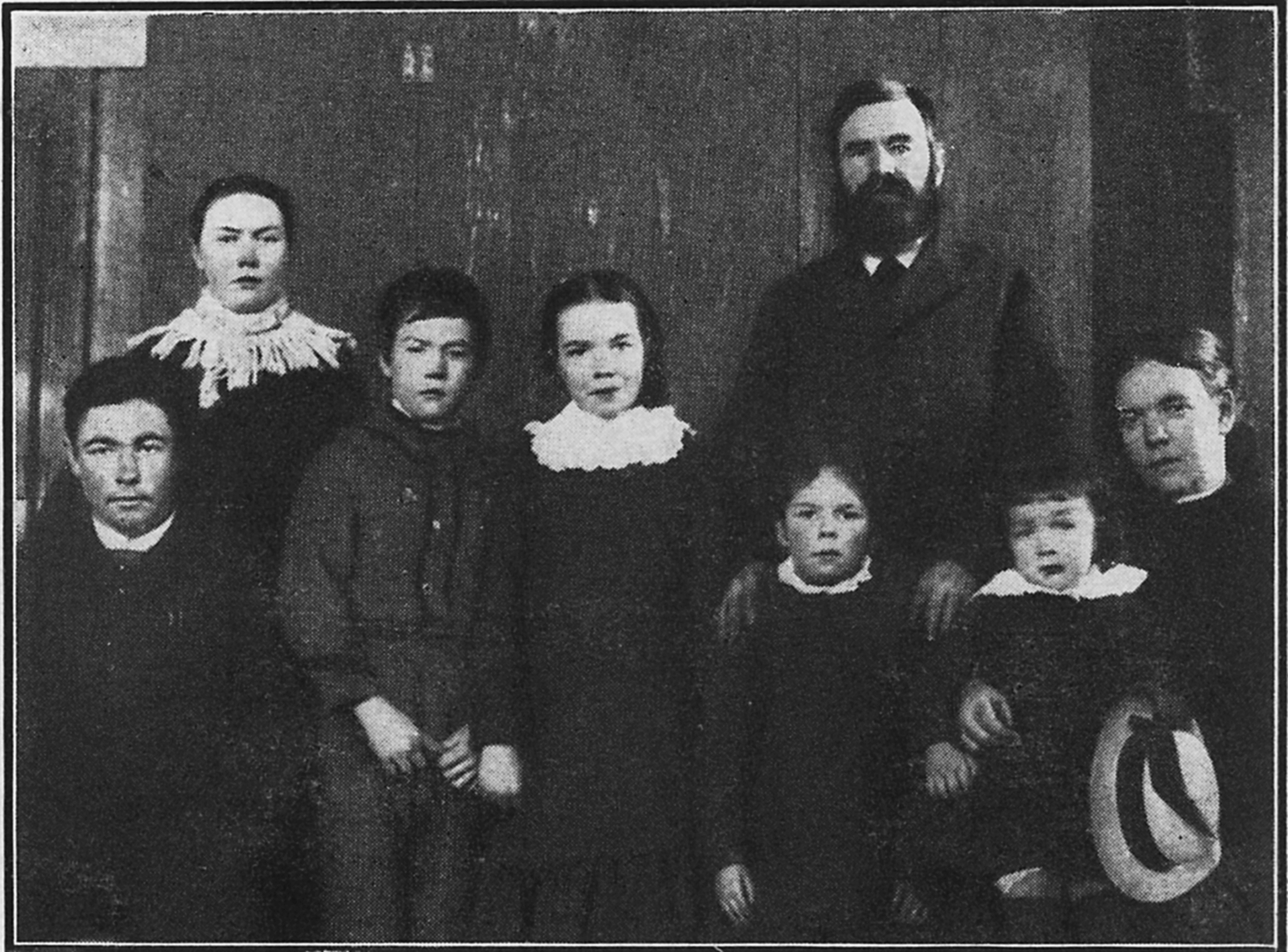
Robert Tomlinson and family

Robert Tomlinson (1842–1913) was an Irish Anglican medical missionary, known for his work with the indigenous peoples of British Columbia.

Robert Tomlinson was born in 1842 in Ireland. He defied his Roman Catholic parents by converting to Anglicanism, prompting his father, Thomas Tomlinson, to disinherit him. He graduated from Trinity College in Dublin, worked as a livery hand to finance his medical training at Adelaide Hospital and was ordained in the Church of Ireland. His parish was St. James Anglican Church in Dublin.

In 1867 he moved to British Columbia as a medical missionary. That same year he met his future wife, Alice Woods, who was also from Ireland, in Victoria, British Columbia.

He served under the Church Missionary Society's Anglican lay minister in charge of the region, William Duncan, who was based at the Tsimshian community he founded, Metlakatla. Despite initial rockiness, Duncan and Tomlinson shared ideals and Tomlinson supported some of Duncan's controversial catechetical innovations, such as omitting the rite of Holy Communion so as not to stir nascent cannibalistic impulses in his flock.

Tomlinson's first serious duty was to re-establish the Rev. Robert A. Doolan's three-year-old Anglican mission among the Nisga'a people by relocating it from the lower Nass River to a newly established community, Kincolith (today known as Gingolx), at the confluence of Ksi Gingolx and the Nass River, near the mouth of the Nass. This became a successful mission on the Metlakatla model. In 1883 he was joined there by the Rev. William Henry Collison.

In 1887, Tomlinson vacillated as to whether he ought to join Duncan in his move with about 800 Tsimshians to form an independent (non-Anglican) mission at "New" Metlakatla, Alaska. Instead, the Tomlinsons joined their fellow missionary A. E. Price in resigning from the Church Missionary Society and moving to the Gitksan village of Kitwanga well up the Skeena River from Metlakatla. In 1888 they formed a new non-sectarian Christian Gitksan village nearby which they called Meanskinisht (a.k.a. Cedarvale).

In 1908 Tomlinson and his son, Robert Tomlinson Jr., moved to Metlakatla, Alaska, to assist Duncan but the elder Tomlinson was upset to find what others too were finding at fault in how Duncan ran the community: that too much economic and political power was in Duncan's own hands and that educating the Tsimshians to be independent citizens was not a priority. Tomlinson left to return to Meanskinisht in 1912.

Tomlinson died the following year at Meanskinisht, of hardening of the arteries, at 71 years of age.

His son's extensive memoirs, recorded by his wife, Roxie Irene Tomlinson, onto reel-to-reel tape, were later organized by their own son, George Tomlinson, into a fiction-style narrative of his life and work, written from Robert Jr.'s first-person perspective.

== Legacy ==
Alice Arm and other similarly named features in that area are named for Tomlinson's wife, Alice Mary Tomlinson. Robert Tomlinson's father was the Rev. Thomas Tomlinson who was the Church of Ireland (Anglican) rector of St. James' Parish in Dublin, Ireland.

== Bibliography ==
- Murray, Peter (1985) The Devil and Mr. Duncan. Victoria, B.C.: Sono Nis Press.
- Neylan, Susan (2003) The Heavens Are Changing: Nineteenth-Century Protestant Missions and Tsimshian Christianity. Montreal: McGill-Queen's University Press.
- Tomlinson, George, and Judith Young (1993) Challenge the Wilderness: A Family Saga of Robert and Alice Tomlinson, Pioneer Medical Missionaries. Seattle: Northwest Wilderness Books.
