= James Benjamin McCullagh =

Irish missionary in Canada (1854–1921)

James Benjamin McCullagh (1854–1921) was an Anglican missionary in British Columbia; he worked under the supervision of the Church Missionary Society, a Protestant body with an evangelical program and practices. McCullagh is notable for his linguistic work in translating portions of the Bible and the Book of Common Prayer into the Nisga'a language. He also created several periodicals aimed at Nisga'a audiences, with the assistance of Nisga'a writers and printers. One of these, Hagaga, is often cited as the first Nisga'a newspaper and as a significant space for discussions about Nisga'a land claim politics. McCullagh was ordained to the diaconate and priesthood in 1890 by the Bishop of Caledonia. His missionary and educational work was centered on the mission village of Aiyansh, British Columbia.

McCullagh was born near Newry, in County Down, Ireland. He was a soldier before becoming a missionary at the age of 29. He was married twice, with one daughter from his first marriage and three daughters and a son from his second marriage. His first wife died of typhoid fever in Aiyansh.

== Bibliography ==
- The nine surviving issues of Hagaga, a Nisga'a and English diglot periodical
- The Caledonia Interchange, an English-language periodical aimed at Nisga'a people and the settler population of the Nass valley.
- A Nishg' a Version of Portions of the Book of Common Prayer (London, 1890)
- The Indian Potlatch: The Substance of a Paper read before C.M.S. Annual Conference at Metlakatla, B.C., 1899
- Ignis: A Parable of the Great Lava Plain in the valley of "Eternal Bloom", Naas River, British Columbia (Aiyansh, c. 1918)
- Red Indians I Have Known (London, c. 1919)
- "Abba, Nigwaud" ... Gením gamzím gígíengwuk'l gan'l anluzabukím Gaud, (Aiyanish, c. 1898)
- Niš'ga Primer (Aiyanish, c. 1895)
