= Nisg̱aʼa Museum =

Museum in British Columbia, Canada

- Hli G̱oothl Wilp-Adoḵshl Nisg̱aʼa
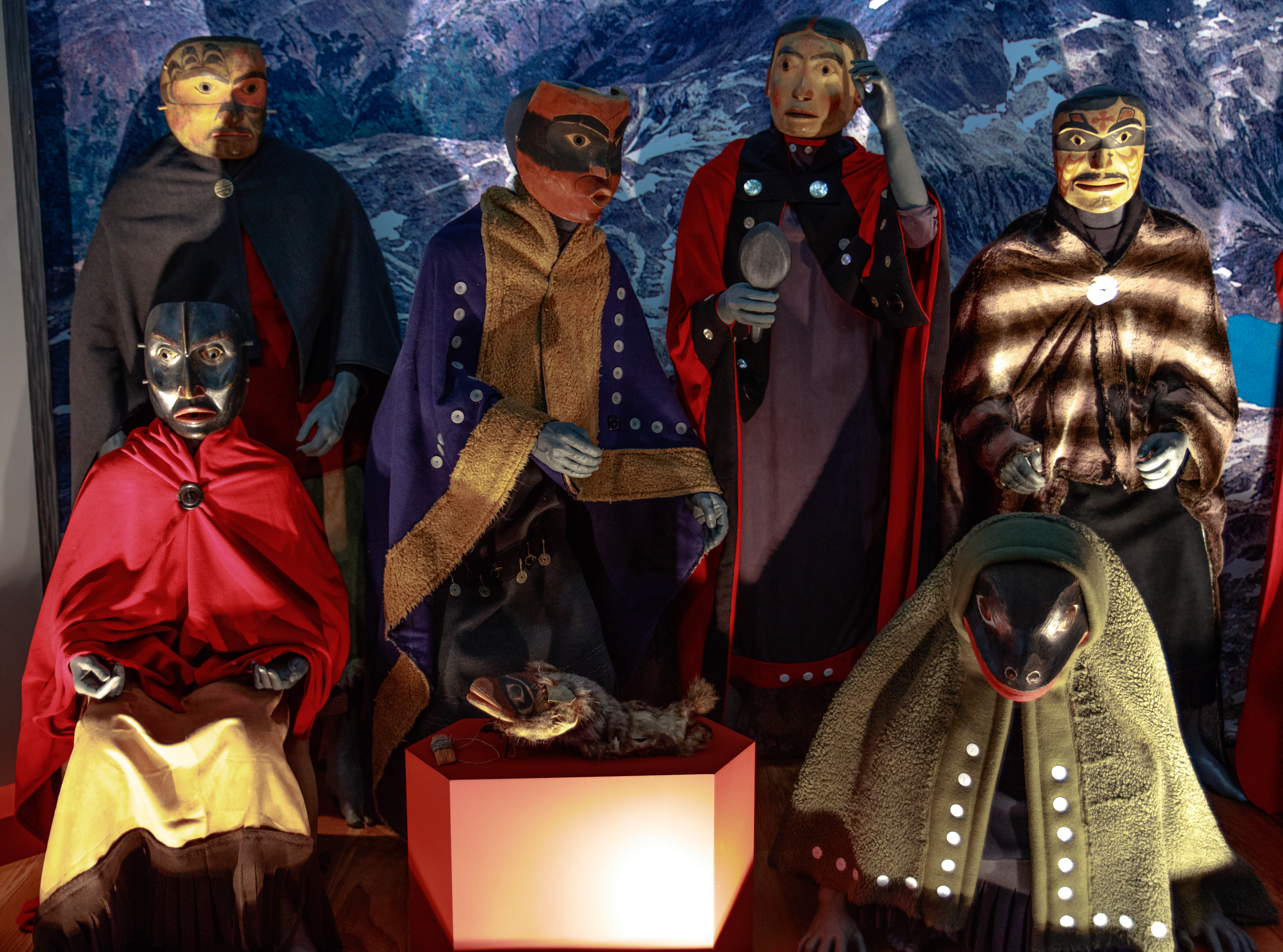
- Interactive map of the Nisg̱aʼa Museum area

General information
- Location: 810 Highway Drive, Lax̱g̱altsʼap, British Columbia, Canada
- Coordinates: 55.0327°N 129.5814°W
- Completed: 2011
- Cost: $14 million

Technical details
- Floor area: 10,000 sq ft (930 m^{2})

Design and construction
- Architect: Hillel Architecture

Website
- nisgaamuseum.ca

The Nisg̱aʼa Museum (Nisga'a: Hli G̱oothl Wilp-Adoḵshl Nisg̱aʼa) is a museum of the Nisg̱aʼa people, located in Lax̱g̱altsʼap, a village in northwestern British Columbia, Canada. The Nisg̱aʼa name means "the heart of Nisg̱aʼa House crests," a name that celebrates the role of tribal crests in Nisg̱aʼa society. The museum is a project of the Nisg̱aʼa Lisims Government and opened in the spring of 2011. It is a place for display of Nisg̱aʼa artifacts, sharing traditions and ideas, and a centre for research and learning. The museum's collection of Nisg̱aʼa culture is "one of the preeminent collections of Northwest Coast aboriginal art" The museum's website states: "This is our gift to each other, our fellow Canadians and the world."

== Exhibits ==
In the late 19th and early 20th centuries, many Nisg̱aʼa artifacts and treasures were destroyed or removed from the Nass Valley by missionaries who established themselves along the Nass River. The Ancestors' Collection (Anhooyaʼahl Gaʼangigatgumʼ ) houses a core collection of over 330 artifacts returned to the Nisg̱aʼa from the Royal British Columbia Museum, the Canadian Museum of Civilization, and the Anglican Church of Canada through the negotiated Nisga'a Treaty. The entrance to the exhibits is through a replica of a Nisg̱aʼa longhouse which are exhibited in four galleries:

- Transformation Gallery: an array of (naxnok or spirits) masks and a celebration of the Nisg̱aʼa performers who brought these spirits to life.
- Halayt Gallery: a display of items used by Nisg̱aʼa shamans to summon, focus, and direct supernatural forces.
- Ayuuk Gallery: a chiefʼs box (or hoohlgan) displaying the regalia and possessions that symbolize the social roles and structures prescribed by the Nisg̱aʼa laws and customs ("Nisg̱aʼa Code, or Ayuukhl Nisg̱aʼa).
- Living River Gallery: a display of possessions used in daily life in a traditional Nisg̱aʼa longhouse, on the land, or along the banks of the Nass River (or Lisims).

Most of the artifacts are displayed in the open with only the most delicate or valuable behind glass, all secured by motion sensors. Included in the displays are four house poles (totem poles), representing the four Nisg̱aʼa clans, that were carved specifically for the museum.

Future exhibits are planned to show both natural history and recent history of the Nisg̱aʼa people, including the struggle for the return of traditional lands and evolution into the self-governing Nisg̱aʼa Nation. Future additions are intended to include a variety of media including an audio guide, audio/visual presentation, museum book, a searchable database, archival software systems, a library and teaching centre, and a gift shop for Nisg̱aʼa art and artists.

The Ni'isjoohl totem pole is a 31 feet (9.4 m) tall hand carved totem pole. The pole was commissioned by the House of Ni’isjoohl in the 19th century to honor Ts'wawit, a Nisg̱aʼa warrior who had died in battle. During the summer of 1929, the pole was taken without permission by Marius Barbeau and sent to the Royal Scottish Museum. On September 29, 2023, the pole formally returned to the Nisg̱aʼa people and will be housed in the museum.

== Facilities ==
Planning for the museum began in the 1990s and funding was allocated as part of the treaty settlement. In September 2010 a formal repatriation ceremony welcomed the return of the artifacts to the Nisg̱aʼa, which were delivered with Royal Canadian Mounted Police escort. The $14 million facility opened on May 11, 2011, the 11th anniversary of the signing of the Nisga'a Treaty.

The architecture emulates traditional Nisg̱aʼa forms: the floor plan a feast bowl, the cross section a traditional longhouse, and the roof a canoe. The canoe form and its siting on a gravel amphitheater, evoking images of a beach, are also references to the motto for the Nisga'a Treaty signing: “our canoe has landed.”.

The facility has the only Class A climate-controlled gallery space in British Columbia's northwest (as of 2014) and has state of the art security.
