= Bert Goulet =

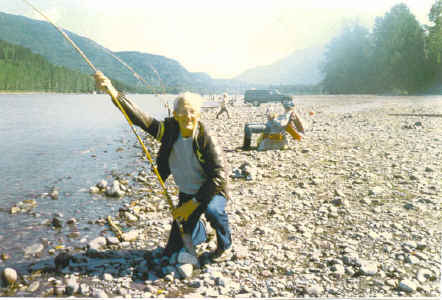
- Albert (Bert) Goulet fishing.
- Born: Albert Goulet; May 12, 1918; Biggar, Saskatchewan
- Died: November 3, 2001; Smithers, British Columbia
- Education: Université de Saint-Boniface
- Known for: Entrepreneur, politician
- Spouse: Patricia Hoy (m. 1950)
- Children: 3

Albert “Bert” Goulet (May 12, 1918 – November 3, 2001) was a Canadian entrepreneur, community leader, and politician in Terrace, British Columbia. He served as a city councillor from 1962 to 1965, and as reeve (mayor) from 1965 to 1967.

== Early life ==
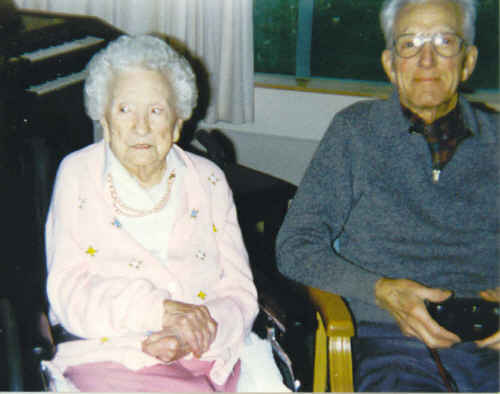
Albert (Bert) Goulet and his mother, Antoinette Goulet, sit together.

Bert was born in Biggar, Saskatchewan on May 12, 1918, to Leon and Antoinette Goulet, French-Canadian pioneers who initially homesteaded in Thornhill, British Columbia. At age two, the family returned to Saskatchewan after a brief attempt at settling in Thornhill. Bert spent his formative years in Carrot River, Saskatchewan, where he attended school and learned English. He graduated from Université de Saint-Boniface, formerly St. Boniface College, in Winnipeg in 1936, specializing in business and commerce.

== Military service ==
In 1941, Goulet enlisted in the Canadian military during World War II. While his initial aspiration to become a pilot was curtailed by motion sickness, he served in administrative roles in British Columbia and later in southern England. He was discharged in May 1946.

== Career and business ventures ==
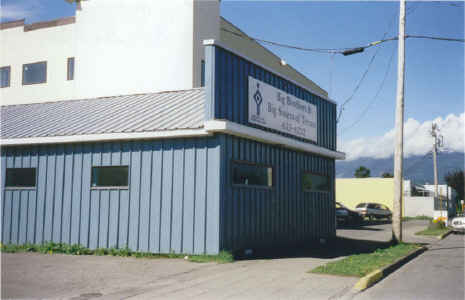
The Lazelle Avenue location of what was once Bert's Grocery in Terrace, British Columbia.

After World War II, Goulet settled in Vancouver, working in various jobs before co-founding Harbor Electric in 1947. In 1951, he moved to Terrace, where he established Bert's Grocery on Lakelse Avenue, a business he ran for 16 years.

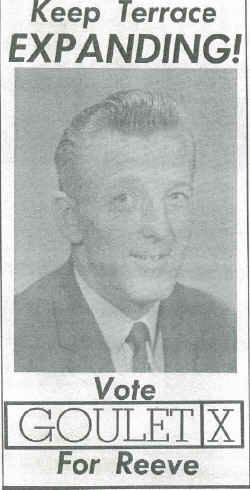
Advertisement for Bert Goulet's campaign to become reeve in Terrace, British Columbia.

In the late 1960s, Goulet transitioned to real estate and later opened Northwest Sportsman, an outdoor sports store in Terrace. The store became a hub for local and visiting anglers before it burnt down on April 13, 2017.

=== Community leadership ===
Goulet was deeply involved in Terrace's civic life.

As a city councillor and later as reeve, he spearheaded efforts to attract businesses to Terrace, including negotiating with Safeway to establish a presence in the city. He also contributed to the development of modern healthcare facilities, serving as a trustee for the Skeena Hospital Improvement District, and purchasing the land that culminated in the opening of the Terrace and District Hospital in 1961, and would later evolve to became Mills Memorial Hospital and now Ksyen Regional Hospital.

Bert was an active member of service organizations such as the Terrace Rotary and Terrace Kinsmen and played a role in local sports and cultural activities.

== Later life and legacy ==
After retiring in 1986, Goulet endured health challenges, including heart attacks and a stroke.

He moved to Smithers, British Columbia, in 2000 and died on November 3, 2001.

== Personal life ==
Bert married Patricia Hoy in 1950, and the couple had three children, Greg, Bert Jr., and Cheryl.
