= Ron Telek =

Canadian artist (1962–2017)

Ron Joseph Telek (born February 16, 1962 – January 25, 2017) was a Canadian First Nations sculptor. He is a member of the Laxsgiik (Eagle Clan) of the Nisga'a nation of northwestern British Columbia, and carries the hereditary name of Jagam Txalp meaning Four Canoes Coming into the Village. Telek's primary medium for his sculptures is wood, although he also includes other materials such as bone, moose hair and abalone into his work.

Telek came from a family of artists, with both his uncles, Alver Tait and Norman Tait, also Nisga'a nation carvers. Telek began carving under the guidance of Tait in 1983, while attending high school in Vancouver. The two worked together on numerous commissions for the carving of several totem poles, including one in Stanley Park and two for the Capilano Mall in North Vancouver in the 1980s.

Since his apprenticeship, Telek has developed his own personal style using traditional Northwest coast techniques which has been particularly impacted by a near-death experience in a car accident which has led him to deal with the theme of transformation. His style has also been influenced by his study of anatomy and African, Japanese, and Italian sculpting techniques at Langara College in Vancouver. Telek's first gallery exhibition was at the Inuit Gallery of Vancouver in 1985. Since that time, Telek has exhibited in New York, Chicago, San Francisco, Seattle, Vancouver and Victoria. He has produced a variety of works, including wooden bowls and puppets though his primary focus has been on the creation of masks. These carved masks, which he often leaves unpainted to show the natural beauty of wood, represent spiritual beings and take a form similar to the spirit masks called Nax Nox.

Telek's work is both metaphysical and psychological in nature and largely concerned with the shamanistic elements of his traditions. It depicting such elements as spirit-helpers and his own dualistic vision of good and evil. An especially important topic in his work is shapeshifting and the transformation of humans into animals, or animals into other animals. He uses a shamanic traditional carving style reminiscent of the Nisga'a Gitsontk artists, who produced objects such as masks and puppets that were used in sacred ceremonies.

Telek lived in Terrace, British Columbia.

In 2001, one of Telek's totem poles was exhibited at the Alcheringa Gallery.
