= Patrick Reid Stewart =

Canadian-born Nisga'a architect, designer and educator

Patrick Robert Reid Stewart (Sim'oogit Ksi Bax̠hlkw) is a Canadian-born Nisga’a architect, designer and educator based in British Columbia. “Dr. Patrick Stewart, a citizen of the Nisga'a Nation in north-western British Columbia has been operating his architectural practice in Sto:lo territory near Chilliwack, B.C. since 1997.” Stewart is the first Aboriginal person in British Columbia to own and operate an architectural firm and consequently his works have a First Nations community development focus. He has chaired the Provincial Indigenous Homelessness Committee in BC since 2005, the Indigenous Task Force for the Royal Architectural Institute of Canada since 2016, and was the first Aboriginal president of an architectural association, the Architectural Institute of British Columbia 2005-2007. Stewart is also an adjunct professor of architecture at Laurentian University for the McEwen School of Architecture in Sudbury, Ontario.

== History ==
Born in British Columbia, Stewart is part of the Nisga’a First Nation, and was “born homeless” as his mother was homeless at the time so was not allowed to take Patrick from the hospital. Stewart was in foster care from birth, and moved often while growing up. Through high school, Stewart's home life began to affect his studies, and he began missing classes. From a young age Stewart knew that he wanted to be involved in the architecture field, but did not think it possible based on his grades. After graduating high school, Stewart attended multiple universities, graduating from five different programs and obtaining his Ph.D. in 2015. Stewart is now an architect with over 50 completed architectural/planning/interiors projects and has been the head of multiple committees and organizations, such as the National Aboriginal Housing Association (2009) and Co-Chair of the Indigenous Peoples Work Programme for the Union of International Architects since 2022. His firm, Patrick Stewart Architect, has been operating since 1995, being the first Indigenous person to own and operate an architectural practice in British Columbia.

== Education ==
Until 1951 in Canada, Indigenous people had to give up their First Nations identity under the Indian Act if they wanted to enter high school or university or a professional field. In 1978, Stewart graduated from Simon Fraser University in the Bachelor of Arts program. He then went on to the Technical University of Nova Scotia, graduating from the Bachelors of Environmental Design Studies (B.E.D.S.) in 1980, and a Bachelors in Architecture (B.Arch.) in 1983. He then pursued his master's degree in Architecture (M. Arch.) at McGill University from 1984 to 1989. At the University of British Columbia, Stewart obtained his Ph. D. The repeal of the Indian Act allowed Stewart to become one of the first Indigenous architects in Canada to have graduated from university with his First Nations identity intact though damaged. Stewart now continues in the education field as an adjunct professor at McEwen School of Architecture in Sudbury, Ontario, which prides itself on its cultural learning environment for the First Nations, Métis, and Inuit communities.

== Approach to architecture ==
Stewart's architecture is focused on working with indigenous communities and organizations. In his practice, Stewart incorporates indigenous design principles and indigenous knowledge. In 2015, Stewart completed his dissertation titled: "Indigenous Architecture through Indigenous Knowledge - dim sagalts'apkw nisim" (Together we will build a Village). “The purpose of this research was to find out how the culture of an Indigenous architect informs their practice of architecture. The research was based on an Indigenous methodology of respect, reciprocity, redistribution, relevance, reflection, relationship and responsibility. Conversations with nineteen Indigenous architects, interior designers and graduates from Turtle Island, Australia, Cihuatan (El Salvador) and Aotearoa (New Zealand) were recorded, transcribed with content analyzed. They self-identified their culture and its influence on their design work.” Stewart was chosen as the architect for many indigenous organizations projects due to his background as a Nisga’a designer. His personal architectural style has been developed through working with indigenous elders, organizations and influenced by prominent First Nations architects in Canada, especially Douglas Cardinal.

== Architectural works ==
Stewart was selected as the architect to design the Dave Pranteau Aboriginal Children's Village in Vancouver. The building is a living space for indigenous children and youth in care.

The Dave Pranteau Aboriginal Children's Village, a foster care housing development in East Vancouver on Nanaimo Street and South Grandview Highway, and works in conjunction with the Youth Mentorship program to provide a stable environment for foster youths. The single units were designed to teach foster children how to live independently, while still providing support within the building. The building includes 24 apartments, from studio apartments to four bedroom dwellings, with commercial spaces on the ground floor. With an amenity kitchen for all the residents to use. The intent of the design was to emphasize a village.

The Sto:lo Resource Centre completed in 2010 offers a range of services such as archives, research, Treaty Outreach, Environmental Resource Management and others. “Built on the prior site of the Coqualeetza Residential School. Based on the traditional form of Qoqolaxel (the innovative inverted gable 'Watery-Eaves' longhouse at the junction of the Chilliwack & Fraser valleys), the Stó:lo People built a Siy:ám House; a place of respect, a place of culture, knowledge, economy, & sharing.”

The Stó:lō Elders Lodge is an assisted living facility located in Chilliwack, BC. It is a ground level building with 15 assisted living suites for seniors and persons with disabilities. The Lodge adheres to the core principles of assisted living, such as choice, privacy, independence, individuality, dignity, and respect.

The Gingolx Community Hall opened in October 2012. The name of the hall was called: Wilp Han‚ Äôii Amgootkws Gitingolx, the Gingolx Memorial Recreation Centre. The hall has many amenities including; a large gym floor covered by a protective rug system to preserve the floor during community events. It has a sound system, and seating with bleachers for sporting and other events. It also has a kitchen that can be used for feasts.

== Publishing ==
"Indigenous Architecture through Indigenous Knowledge - dion sagalt'apkw nisim (Together we will build a Village)". His dissertation on Indigenous culture and how it informs Indigenous architecture, issued in 2015.

Patrick is a co-editor of Our Voices, Indigeneity in Architecture (2018). “The book begins as its title signals, calling to its reader in chapter-long verses that share research findings, practice observations, lived experiences and creative modes at the confluence of Indigeneity and architecture. Our voices is an extensive survey comprising 25 chapters contributed by indigenous thinkers working as academics, activists, architects, artists, conservationists, designers, educators, policy analysts, urban planners and researchers invested in indigenous architectures.” Our Voices II: the decolonial project (2021) was also published by ORO Ediitons.

Patrick is also the author of a book of poetry, Complex Intimacies (2021) and he is working on the forthcoming books, I Heard my Grandfather Speak in the Longhouse and Our Voices III: catalysts for change.
