= School District 92 Nisgaʼa =

School district in British Columbia, Canada

- Logo of School District 92 Nisga'a, featuring a copper with numbers 92

Location
- Gitlaxt'aamiks or New Aiyansh Gitlaxt'aamiks, Gitwinksihlkw, Laxgalts'ap, Gingolx in Northwest Canada

District information
- Superintendent: Nancy Wells
- Schools: 4
- Budget: CA$6.2 million

Students and staff
- Students: 627

Other information
- Website: www.nisgaa.bc.ca

School District 92 Nisgaʼa is a school district in British Columbia, Canada. Situated in the Nass River valley it covers the First Nations area of the Nisga'a people north of Terrace. This includes the communities of Gitlaxt'aamiks (or New Aiyansh), Gitwinksihlkw (or Canyon City), Laxgalts'ap (or Greenville), Gingolx (or Kincolith), and the surrounding settlements.

== History ==
School District 92 Nisga'a was created January 1, 1975 as the first aboriginal school district in the province. There has been a steady decline in the number of students over the past several years. In September 2010, there were 422 students in Grades K-12. School populations range from 46 students in the smallest elementary school to 241 in the combined elementary/secondary school located in the largest community. There are 44 students designated as having special needs, within the Ministry of Education categories.

== Schools ==
School	Location	Grades
Gitwinksihlkw Elementary School	Gitwinksihlkw	K-7
Alvin A. McKay Elementary School (formerly Laxgalts'ap Elementary School)	Laxgalts'ap	K-7
Nathan Barton Elementary School	Gingolx	K-7
Nisga'a Elementary Secondary School	Gitlaxt'aamiks	K-12

The School District also operates the Nisga'a ACE School for Adult Continuing Education. The schools are relatively far geographically from each other.

== See also ==
- List of school districts in British Columbia
