= Hobiyee =

Nisga'a new year

Hoobiyee
- Also called: Hoobiyee, Hobiyee, Hobiiyee, Hoobiiyee; Like a Spoon
- Observed by: Nisg̱aʼa
- Type: Indigenous Celebration
- Significance: New Year
- Date: February / March; Buxw-laḵs / X̱saak
- 2025 date: 28 February, 1 March

Hobiyee, also spelled Hoobiyee, Hobiiyee and Hoobiiyee, is the Nisg̱aʼa new year celebrated every February or March. It signifies the emergence of the first crescent moon and begins the month Buxw-laḵs. Celebrations of Hobiyee are done by Nisg̱aʼa wherever they are located, but the largest celebrations are in Nisg̱aʼa itself and in areas with a large Nisg̱aʼa presence like Vancouver.

== Etymology ==
Hobiyee comes from the phrase "Hobixis hee!" meaning the "moon is in the shape of the hoobix." The hoobix is the bowl of the Nisg̱aʼa wooden spoon. Hobiyee thus signifies the potential for an abundant harvest (or filled spoon) if the crescent moon's edges point upward.

== Significance ==
At Hobiyee, if the crescent moon is seen with its edges pointing upward, it foretells an abundant year of salmon, oolichans (saak), berries and various other foods. The months Buxw-laḵs and X̱saak indicate the end of the winter and the emergence of oolichans in the rivers, the first food supply to arrive when winter resources were depleted (buxw means 'to blow about' and laḵs means 'needles'; x̱saak means 'to eat oolichans').

If a star is sitting in the centre of the crescent moon ("ii luu-t’aahl bil̓ist ahl ts’im hoobix"), it is a sign of abundance in Nisg̱a’a. Other positions of the stars around the moon have different interpretations. A sideways Hobiyee moon without a star sitting in it denotes a poor year of resources as was the case in 2006

== Observance ==
The simgigat (Nisg̱aʼa chieftains) were responsible for the proper management of resources on their lands as well as studying astrology. An adept sim’oogit would be able to practise the Halayt discipline which allows them to become a swan̓iskw or swan̓isgwit meaning spiritual leader, medicine person or doctor. Some were considered able "to forecast the weather" and called guxw-hloḵsit (astronomer/astrologist). A swan̓iskw would study the moon in Buxw-laḵs to determine when the harvest would begin in Ḵ'alii-Aksim Lisims. Grandfathers would keep an eye on the moon, and upon seeing the Hobiyee moon, they would run into the village yelling, "Hobiyee! Hobiyee!" followed by children raising their arms in the shape of the Hobiyee moon.

Hlayim Wil witnessed this in the village of Gitwinksihlkw around 1940, when suddenly a loud voice would be heard outside, hollering, and immediately, the entire village was in motion. A senior member in the Wilp of Bax̱k’ap had sighted the Hobiyee moon and consequently carried out the traditional act of informing the villagers.

Before he passed on, Sim’oogit Gitx̱hun, Paul Clayton, shared that the Nisg̱a’a had a ceremony for the first feed of oolichan. He could not remember the song, only that it was called "Limx Wi’idim Saak / song for roasting (the first feed of) oolichans." The performer donned special ceremonial gear—in particular, special coverings for his arms; he danced, and he sang as he roasted the first feed of oolichan over the open fire. We also have a special story about the Simgigadim Saak/the Oolichan Chieftains which is part of the Tx̱eemsim Adaawaḵ, and also, an account of how the oolichan and spring salmon taunted each other as they passed each other in Ḵ’alii-Aksim Lisims ... a brief but interesting story illustrating our belief in being one with nature....

The 2017 date of the observance was February 14–15.
