= Ging̱olx =

Ging̱olx Kincolith
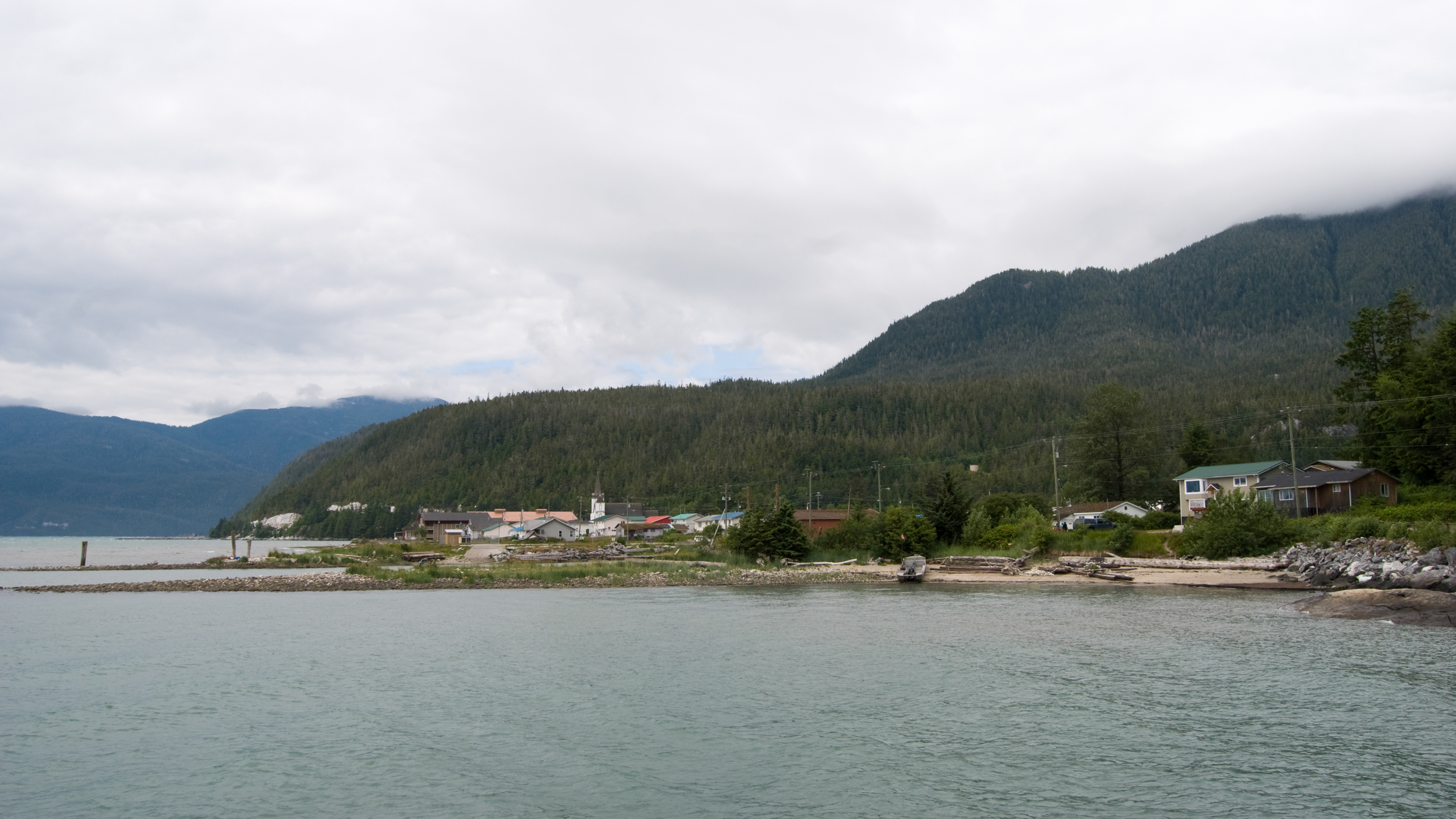
- Approaching Ging̱olx from the east

- Location of Ging̱olx in British Columbia
- Coordinates: 54°59′N 129°57′W
- Country: Canada
- Province: British Columbia
- Indigenous territories: Nisg̱a'a
- Established: 1867

Government
  - Governing body: Nisg̱a’a Lisims Government

Population
  - Total: 341
- Time zone: UTC−8 (PST)
  - Summer (DST): UTC−7 (PDT)
- Postal code span: V0V 1B0
- Area code: 250

Ging̱olx (/ˈɡɪnɡɒlx/; Gingolx or Kincolith) is a Nisg̱a’a village located at the confluence of the Ksi Gingolx and Nass Rivers in British Columbia, Canada. The village population is approximately 400 people. Ging̱olx is one of four Nisg̱a’a villages that make up the Nisg̱a’a Nation. The community itself has four clans which are Killer Whale, Eagle, Raven and Wolf. Ging̱olx village's government consists of 1 chief and 5 councillors.

The name Ging̱olx comes from the Nisg̱a’a language words meaning "scalp givers." Gin means "to give" and golx means "scalps". When attacked by another nation or when the land was intruded upon, the people of Ging̱olx fought back and won. They hung their enemies' scalps on sticks, lining them up along the river as a warning.

== Modern history ==
Ging̱olx was founded as a permanent settlement in 1867 by Christian missionaries who came down river by raft. The founder of the mission was the Rev. Robert Tomlinson, an Anglican medical missionary who succeeded the Rev. Robert A. Doolan, who had begun the Anglican Nass mission at Greenville, also known as Lax̱g̱altsʼap. Ging̱olx's first European type buildings (including houses, a school, and a church) were all built in 1879.

Ging̱olx was originally inhabited by two clans pre-contact. The first clan was Daaxan of the Killerwhale clan, they inhabited the eastern side of the village, and the second clan was Gitxun, the eagle clan, they inhabited the western side of the village.

In the 1890s the Rev. William Henry Collison joined Tomlinson at the mission. He died there in 1922, and his memoirs describe the community in detail.

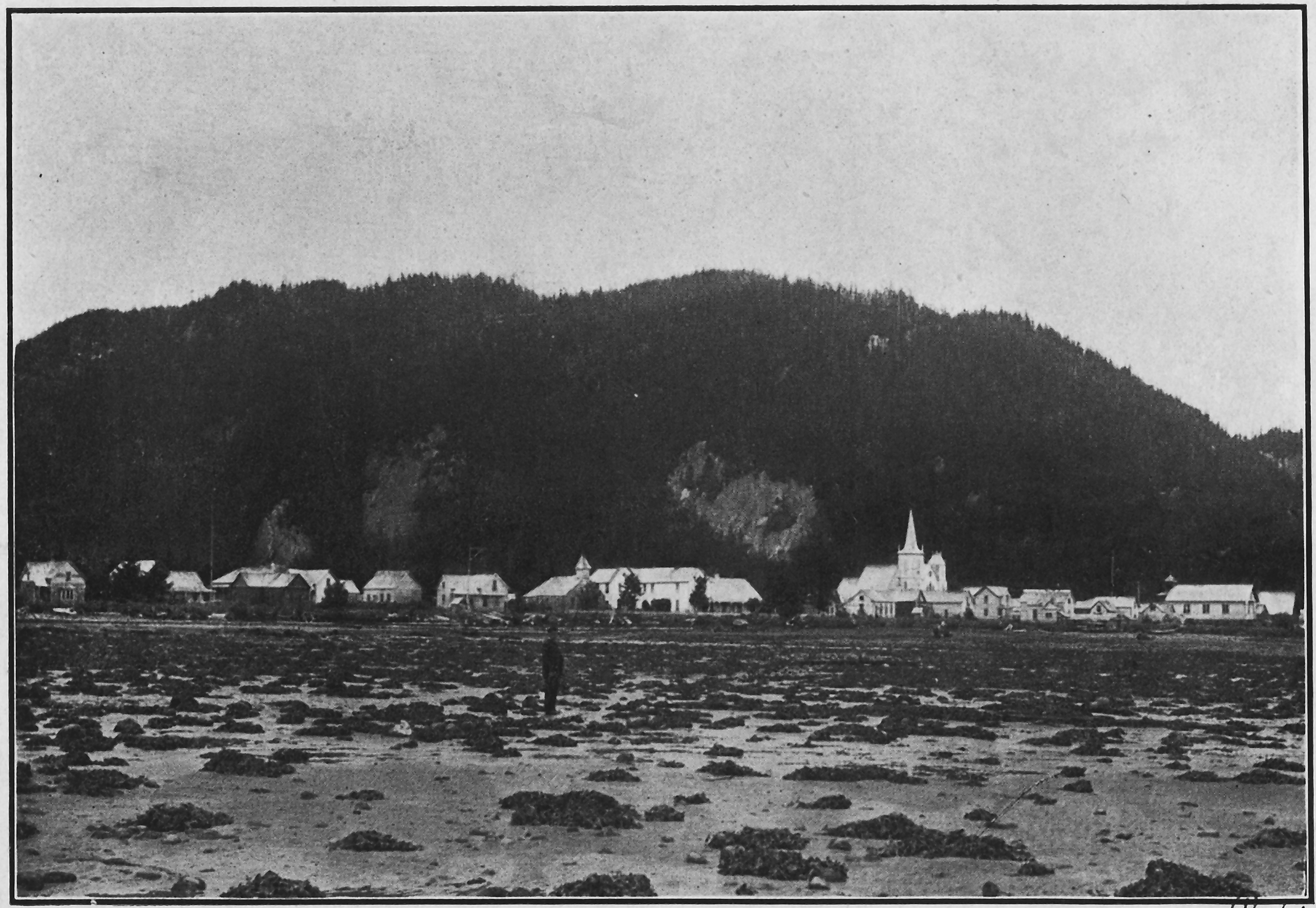
Kincolith mission settlement, late 19th or early 20th Century

=== Isolation ===
Because of its location on the Nass River near the Alaska Panhandle, Ging̱olx was once an isolated village, the only ways able to get in being boat or plane. This isolation combined with the surrounding mountains meant Ging̱olx would often suffer power outages due to snow during the winter months. Residents could go as long as 3 weeks without power until helicopters could be flown in to fix the lines.

In 2003, a 28 km road from Ging̱olx to Greenville was completed, which connected Ging̱olx to the other three Nisg̱a’a communities. This road, the Kincolith Extension Highway, links Ging̱olx to the Nisga'a Highway with connections to the Yellowhead, and Cassiar Highways and cost $34 million to build.

In 2010, the Supreme Court of Canada released a landmark decision in the case of Tercon Contractors Ltd. v. British Columbia (Transportation and Highways), awarding $3 million in damages to Tercon. The subject of that case was the tendering process, in which the court found the government had improperly awarded the contract to a company which was not an authorized bidder: the contract in question was the contract to build this road from Ging̱olx to Lax̱g̱altsʼap.

== Economy ==
Ging̱olx's geographic location means fishing, forestry, and tourism are its main sources of revenue.

== Education ==
The community is served by School District 92 Nisga'a and hosts Nathan Barton Elementary School. The secondary school is in Gitlakdamix.

== Culture and recreation ==
Ging̱olx has its own concert band and Ging̱olx Ceremonial Dancers, who perform at weddings, funerals, and other occasions such as Crabfest, Seafest, River Boat Days, and the Nisg̱a’a New Year celebration, Hobiyee. Hobiyee is an annual celebration, in the older days, when the moon was shaped like a bowl, the first person to see it would shout, Hoobixim Yee. It was a celebration and recognition that wildlife would be in abundance again.

Hiking and mountaineering is common, and one of the nearby mountains has a "look-out" which offers brilliant views from three stages on the trail.

In 1947, the Sons of Kincolith won the inaugural All Native Basketball Tournament.

=== Crabfest ===
This annual summer outdoor music festival was started in 2004 by Community Development Worker Ellen Torng, with the assistance of local resident Nadine Clayton until the end of 2005. Crabfest has since been coordinated by Michele Stevens along with the Ging̱olx Arts Society Board. It has attracted many tourists due to its eye-catching headliners and entertaining musicians. The festival is two days in length and has featured such well-known names as Trooper, Chilliwack, Prairie Oyster, Doc Walker, Buffy Sainte-Marie, Dr. Hook & the Medicine Show, Jeff Healey, Tom Lavin of the Powder Blues Band, Nazareth, Tom Cochrane, Murray Porter, 54-40, and the Legends of London among other local bands, and tribute bands from across Canada, and the United States.

The festival is centered on the medium-sized stage set up and is accompanied by the many vendors lining the streets. The stage itself is monitored by professional sound and lighting crews.

Crabfest has been a success for the small town of Ging̱olx bringing in tourists from around the world, boosting the economy greatly with the effects felt well after the festival is over.

There have been negative effects of the festival itself. The abundant supply of Chinook salmon in the river bordering the town was largely untapped by tourists until the lure of the music festival led to the discovery of the large salmon and has caused the number of spawning salmon to drop below natural levels. This has led to the closure of fishing on the river which may lead to a large drop in tourism apart from the crabfest.

== Ging̱olx Village government ==
- Chief councillor – George Moore
- Deputy chief councillor – Claude Barton
- Councillor – John Moore
- Councillor – Arlene V. Lincoln
- Councillor – Henry Stephens
- Councillor – Gwen L. Nelson

== Prominent people of Ging̱olx ==
- Norman Tait, Master Carver – deceased
- Alver Tait, Master Carver
- Eddie Benson, Carver
- Murphy Oliver Stanley, Master Carver. – Deceased
- Nathan Barton, Ging̱olx Chief. Barton pushed for the construction of a new administration building, and the local elementary school which now bears his name.

== Bibliography ==
- Collison, W. H. (1915) In the Wake of the War Canoe: A Stirring Record of Forty Years' Successful Labour, Peril and Adventure amongst the Savage Indian Tribes of the Pacific Coast, and the Piratical Head-Hunting Haida of the Queen Charlotte Islands, British Columbia. Toronto: Musson Book Company. Reprinted by Sono Nis Press, Victoria, B.C. (ed. by Charles Lillard), 1981.
- Neylan, Susan (2003) The Heavens Are Changing: Nineteenth-Century Protestant Missions and Tsimshian Christianity. Montreal: McGill-Queen's University Press.
- Tomlinson, George, and Judith Young (1993) Challenge the Wilderness: A Family Saga of Robert and Alice Tomlinson, Pioneer Medical Missionaries. Seattle: Northwest Wilderness Books.
