= Ganhada =

Raven clan in Tsimshian

The Ganhada (variously spelled, but often as G̱anhada) is the name for the Raven "clan" (phratry) in the language of the Tsimshian nation of British Columbia, Canada, and southeast Alaska. It is considered analogous or identical to the G̱anada (Raven/Frog) Tribe of the Nisga'a nation in British Columbia and the Frog clan among B.C.'s Gitxsan nation. The Gitxsan also sometimes use the term Laxsee'le to describe the Frog clan.

== Nisg̱a'a - G̱anada ==
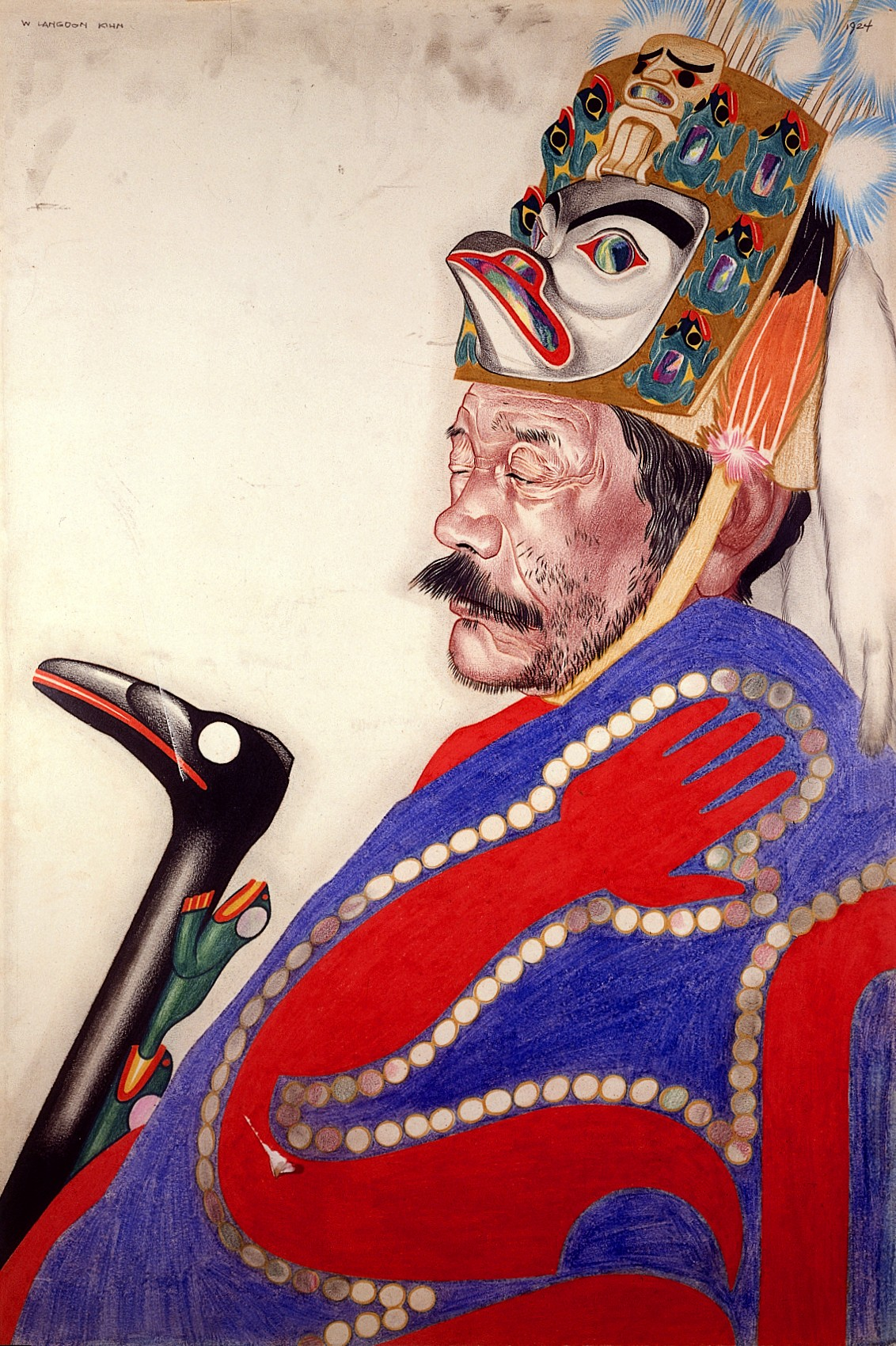

The house groups of the G̱anada among the Nisga’a include:

- Git-Wilt'uutskwhl Aks (People-Where-Water-Runs-Black) Clan:
  - House of Ax̱dii Wil Luu-G̱ooda - Wallace Clark
  - House of Ksim X̱saan - Earl Munroe
  - House of Wil Luu-G̱aamiks Hloḵs - Wayne Nisyok
- House of Tx̱aatḵ'anlax̱hatkw - (previously Sidney Alexander) (not to be confused with eagle chieftain name Tx̱aalax̱hatkw)
- House of Ni’isjoohl - Earl Stephens
- House of Ax̱hlaawaals - (previously Richard Leeson)
- House of Haym̓aas - Clifford Morgan (prev. Chester Moore)
- House of Laadax̱ - (previously Leonard Watts)
- House of Luux̱hoon - (previously Bert Adams, Sr)
- House of Ax̱dii'anx̱smax - Larry Derrick

== See also ==
- Raven Tales
