= Lax̱g̱altsʼap =

Lax̱g̱altsʼap Greenville
- Village
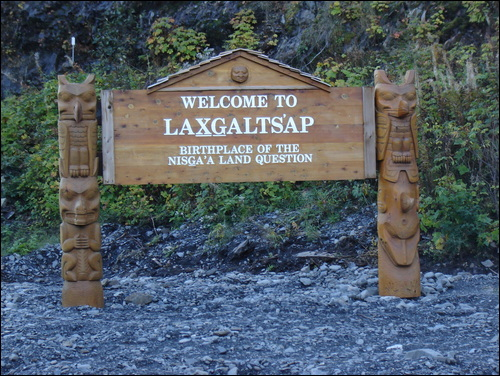
- Lax̱g̱altsʼap/Greenville, BC. Entrance sign carved by Merlin Robinson
- Motto(s): Dwelling place, Comprised of Dwelling Places
- Location of Lax̱g̱altsʼap in British Columbia
- Coordinates: 55°01′50″N 129°34′30″W
- Country: Canada
- Province: British Columbia
- Indigenous territories: Nisg̱aʼa

Government
  - Governing body: Nisg̱a’a Lisims Government

Population
  - Total: 474
- Time zone: UTC−8 (PST)
  - Summer (DST): UTC−7 (PDT)
- Postal code: V0J 1X0
- Area code: 250

Lax̱g̱altsʼap /læxˈɑːldzæp/ (also Laxqaltsʼap, and formerly Lachkaltsap) is a Nisg̱a’a village of approximately 248, in the Nass River valley of British Columbia, Canada. It is one of the four main villages in the Nisg̱a’a Lisims, the formal name for their territory, and is situated on the north side of the Nass River between Gitwinksihlkw to the east and Ging̱olx to the west. It is approximately 24 km from where the Nass empties into the Pacific Ocean at Nass Bay. Road access is via the Nisga'a Highway.

== Name origin ==
In the Nisg̱a’a language, Lax̱g̱altsʼap translates to "village on village"—the current village was built on the site of a much older one.
The older village at this site, known as Gitxatʼin, was destroyed by fire.

Lax̱g̱altsʼap got its English name of Greenville (pron. /ˈɡrɛnvɪl/ GREN-vil) from Methodist Missionary Alfred Green, who was based here in the late 19th century.

Until reconstituted as a Nisg̱a’a Village in 2000 by the terms of the Nisga'a Treaty, Lax̱g̱altsʼap was formerly Lachkaltsap Indian Reserve No. 9.

== Nisg̱a’a Museum ==
The Nisg̱a’a Museum is the Nisg̱a’a people's primary place for display of Nisg̱a’a artifacts, sharing traditions and ideas, and a centre for research and learning. It was established in Lax̱g̱altsʼap and opened in the spring of 2011.

== Education ==
The community is served by School District 92 Nisga'a and hosts Alvin A. McKay Elementary School. The secondary school is in Gitlakdamix.

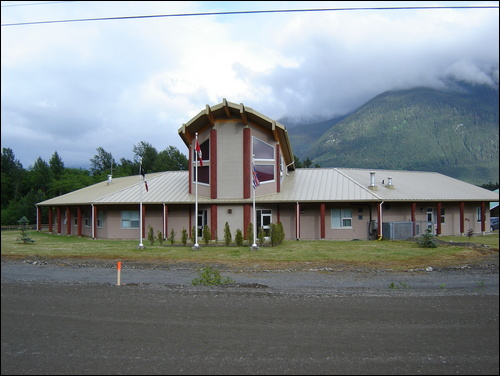
Laxgaltsʼap Village Government Office
