= Gitlax̱tʼaamiks =

Gitlax̱tʼaamiks New Aiyansh
- Village
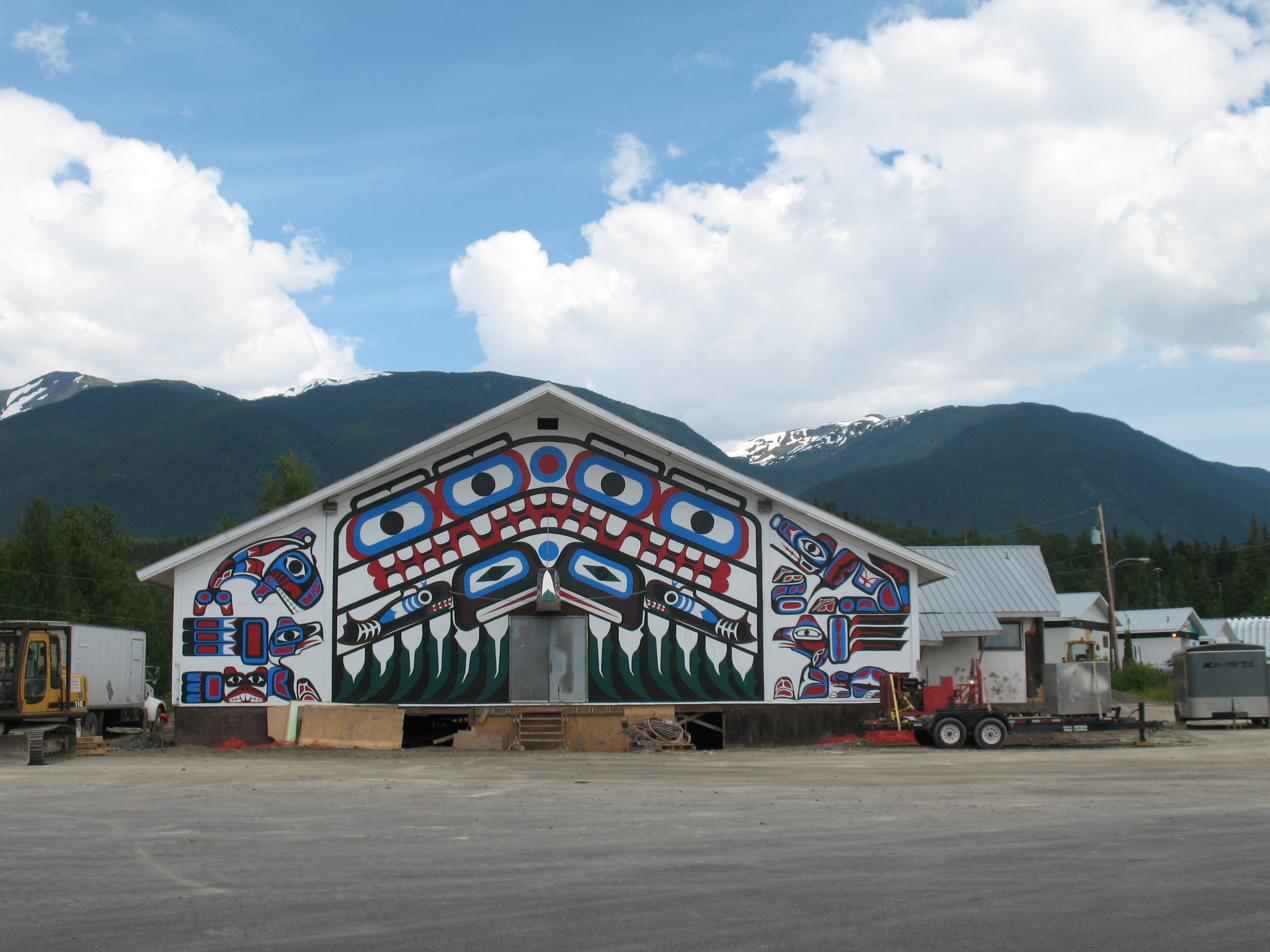
- Traditional Community Building in Gitlax̱tʼaamiks

- Location of Gitlax̱tʼaamiks in British Columbia
- Coordinates: 55°12′22″N 129°4′47″W
- Country: Canada
- Province: British Columbia
- Indigenous territories: Nisgaʼa
- Established: 1974

Government
  - Governing body: Nisga'a Lisims Government

Population
  - Total: 806
- Time zone: UTC−08:00 (PST)
  - Summer (DST): UTC−07:00 (PDT)
- Postal code: V0J 1A0
- Area code: 250

Gitlax̱tʼaamiks (/ɡɪtˈlɑːdəmɪks/), formerly New Aiyansh (/aɪˈænʃ/), is a Nisgaʼa village about 100 km (62 mi) north of Terrace, in the heart of the Nass River valley, Canada. It is one of four Nisga'a villages. Though it is located in British Columbia, it is also considered the "capital of the Nisga'a Nation". The Nisg̱a'a Lisims Government building (Wilp si'Ayuukhl Nisg̱a'a), which opened in 2000, is located here. The area is home to 806 people and the Nisga'a Memorial Lava Bed Provincial Park. Gitlax̱tʼaamiks is located overlooking a lava flow that erupted in the 18th century. The source for this lava flow was the Tseax Cone.

In front of the Nisgaʼa Elementary Secondary School stands the Unity Totem Pole which, raised in 1977, was the first totem pole raised in the Nass Valley since the late 19th century.

== Name origin ==
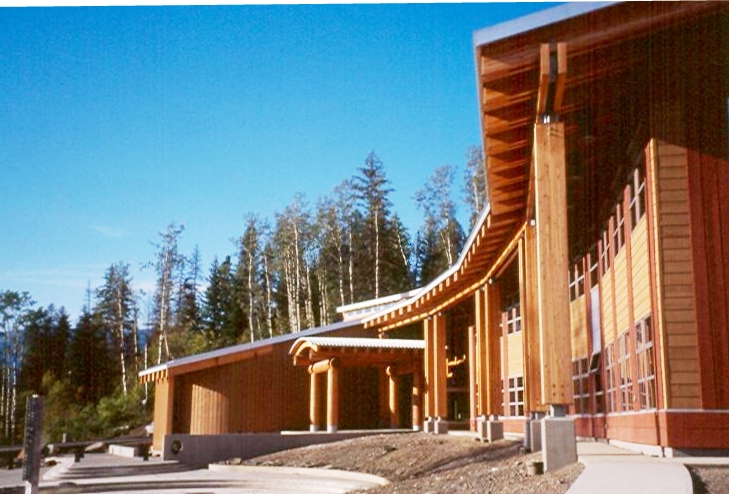
The Nisg̱a'a Lisims Government Building and forecourt in 2000 (before completion)

Gitlax̱t'aamiks means "people of the ponds" in the Nisga'a language. The name New Aiyansh was established in 1974. Though the name Aiyansh was originally at a location 3 miles to the northeast, maps now show both Aiyansh and New Aiyansh at the modern location. The original Aiyansh was partly destroyed by flood in November 1917 and the community moved to Gitlax̱t'aamiks. A later flood in this community led to relocation to the higher site which became New Aiyansh in the late 1960s.

New Aiyansh was formerly New Aiyansh Indian Reserve No. 1, which was extinguished by the Nisga'a Treaty as of May 11, 2000. The location of "old" Aiyansh was formerly Aiyansh Indian Reserve 1, also extinguished by the terms of the Nisga'a Treaty like all other Nisga'a-related Indian Reserves.

== Education ==
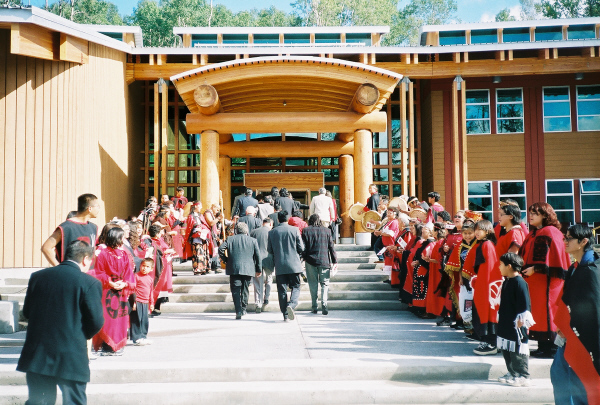
Dedication ceremonies for the new Nisg̱a'a Lisims Government Building in 2000

The community is served by School District 92 Nisga'a and is home to Nisga'a Elementary Secondary School. This school provides elementary school education for this village and secondary school education to all four Nisga'a Villages in the Nass Valley. The offices of the School District are located here.

== Capital of the Nisga'a Nation ==
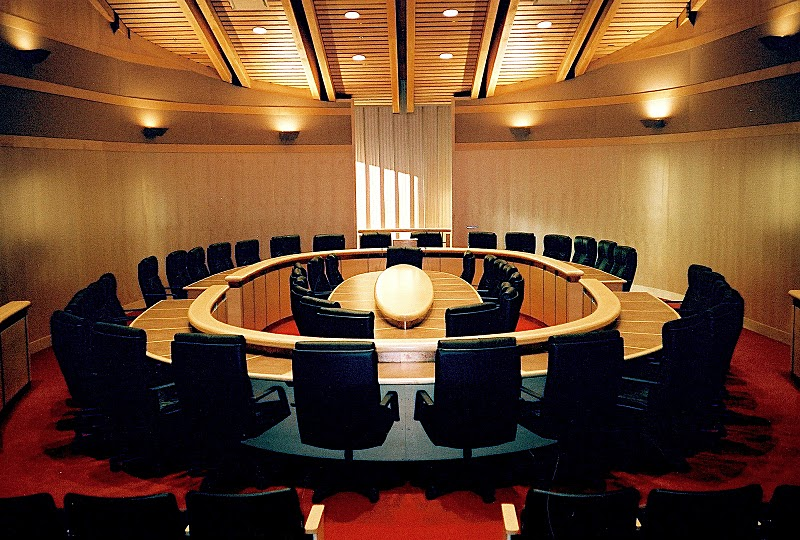
The Chamber, elliptical in form to support consensus-style of governing, with the Speaker located at the head and a stand for the "talking stick"

The legislative functions and administrative offices of the government of the Nisga'a Nation, the Wilp si'Ayuukhl Nisg̱a'a, are located in the Nisg̱a'a Lisims Government Building. This new facility was completed in 2000 and dedicated in September. This was around the time of the signing of the Nisga'a Final Agreement. It houses the Council Chamber, executive offices, meeting rooms, legal services, archives, and various public administrative services. The Council Chamber was designed to support the traditional consensus-style of governing. Members sit around an elliptical table, where each is equal.
