= Nisgaʼa language =

Tsimshianic language of northwestern British Columbia

Nisgaʼa
- Nisqaʼa
- Nisg̱aʼa, nisqáʔamq
- Pronunciation: [nisɢaʔa]
- Native to: Canada
- Region: Northwest British Columbia (Nisg̱aʼa Nation)
- Ethnicity: 5,495 Nisgaʼa
- Native speakers: 610 (2021 census); 1,500 L2 speakers
- Language family: Tsimshianic: Nass–Gitksan; Nisgaʼa
- Writing system: Nisg̱aʼa alphabet (NAPA)

Language codes
- ISO 639-3: ncg
- Glottolog: nisg1240
- ELP: Nisga'a
- Nisgaʼa

- Nisgaʼa is classified as Severely Endangered by the UNESCO Atlas of the World's Languages in Danger.

- People: Nisgaʼa
- Language: Nisg̱aʼamg̱
- Country: Nisg̱aʼa La̱xyip

Nisgaʼa (also Nisg̱aʼa, Nass, Nisgha, Nishka, Niska, Nishga, Nisqaʼa) is an Indigenous language of northwestern British Columbia. It is a part of the language family generally called Tsimshianic, although some Nisgaʼa people resent the precedence the term gives to Coast Tsimshian. Nisgaʼa is very closely related to Gitxsan. Indeed, many linguists regard Nisgaʼa and Gitksan as dialects of a single Nass–Gitksan language. The two are generally treated as distinct languages out of deference to the political separation of the two groups.

== History and usage ==
Like almost all other First Nations languages of British Columbia, Nisgaʼa is an endangered language. In the 2018 Report on the Status of B.C. First Nations Languages, there were 311 fluent speakers and 294 active language learners reported in a population of 6,113.

Anglican missionary James Benjamin McCullagh conducted much early linguistic work in Nisgaʼa, preparing translations of parts of the Bible and Book of Common Prayer published in 1890, as well as a Nisgaʼa primer for students published in 1897. These were published by the Society for Promoting Christian Knowledge (SPCK). These items included some portions of Scripture.

Other notable documentation of the Nisgaʼa language include "A Short Practical Dictionary of the Gitksan Language" compiled by Bruce Rigsby and Lonnie Hindle, published in 1973 in Volume 7, Issue 1 of Journal of Northwest Anthropology. In this dictionary, Rigsby created a simple alphabet for Nisgaʼa that is widely used today.

=== Revitalization efforts ===
In January 2012, a Nisgaʼa app for iPhone and iPad was released for free. Recently, the app was made available for use on Android. The Nisgaʼa app is a bilingual dictionary and phrase collection archived at the First Voices data base, resources include audio recordings, images and videos.

Since 1990, the First Peoples' Heritage Language and Culture Council has been providing support to revitalize First Peoples' language, arts and cultures. A total of $20 million has been distributed to support various projects, including revitalization of Nisgaʼa language. In 2003, First Voices website, an online language archive was created to support language documentation, language teaching, and revitalization. The Nisgaʼa First Voices is publicly accessible. Information on the website is managed by the Wilp Wilx̱oʼoskwhl Nisg̱aʼa Institute. Resources include alphabets, online dictionary, phrasebook, songs, stories, and interactive online games with sounds, pictures and videos. A total of 6092 words and 6470 phrases have been archived on the Nisgaʼa Community Portal at First Voices.

In 1993, the Wilp Wilx̱oʼoskwhl Nisg̱aʼa Institute (WWNI) was established to provide post-secondary education for Nisgaʼa community and promote language and culture revitalization. It is the Nisgaʼa university-college located in the Nass Valley in Gitwinksihlkw on the northwest coast of British Columbia. The WWNI is a community driven, non-profit organization that is affiliated with the University of Northern British Columbia, Coast Mountain College (formerly Northwest Community College), and Royal Roads University. It is the only place where students can earn accreditation and certification of its courses and programs in Nisgaʼa Studies.

A recent project called “Raising Nisgaʼa Language, Sovereignty, and Land-Based Education Through Traditional Carving Knowledge” (RNL) was started by Nisgaʼa professor Amy Parent at University of British Columbia working with and the Laxgaltsʼap Village Government. It will run over several years and aims to combine virtual reality technology with traditional knowledge in Nisgaʼa.

== Phonology ==
The phonology in Nisgaʼa is presented as follows:

=== Consonants ===
		Labial	Alveolar			Palatal	Velar		Uvular	Glottal
		Labial	plain	sibilant	lateral	Palatal	plain	rounded	Uvular	Glottal
Plosive/ Affricate	plain	p ⟨p⟩	t ⟨t⟩	ts ⟨ts⟩			k ⟨k⟩	kʷ ⟨kw⟩	q ⟨ḵ⟩	ʔ ⟨ʼ⟩
Plosive/ Affricate	ejective	pʼ ⟨pʼ⟩	tʼ ⟨tʼ⟩	tsʼ ⟨tsʼ⟩	tɬʼ ⟨tlʼ⟩		kʼ ⟨kʼ⟩	kʼʷ ⟨kwʼ⟩	qʼ ⟨ḵʼ⟩	ʔ ⟨ʼ⟩
Fricative				s ⟨s⟩	ɬ ⟨hl⟩		x ⟨x⟩	xʷ ⟨xw⟩	χ ⟨x̱⟩	h ⟨h⟩
Sonorant	plain	m ⟨m⟩	n ⟨n⟩		l ⟨l⟩	j ⟨y⟩		w ⟨w⟩		
Sonorant	glottalized	ˀm ⟨m̓⟩	ˀn ⟨n̓⟩		ˀl ⟨l̓⟩	ˀj ⟨y̓⟩		ˀw ⟨w̓⟩		

=== Vowels ===
	Front		Central		Back	
	short	long	short	long	short	long
High	i ⟨i⟩	iː ⟨ii⟩			u ⟨u⟩	uː ⟨uu⟩
Mid	e ⟨e⟩	eː ⟨ee⟩			o ⟨o⟩	oː ⟨oo⟩
Low			a ⟨a⟩	aː ⟨aa⟩		

The high and mid short front vowels /i/ and /e/ as well as the high and mid short back vowels /u/ and /o/ are largely found to be in complementary distribution in native Nisgaʼa words but these pairs of sounds contrast one another in words borrowed into the language, making them distinct.

In Nisgaʼa phonology, the voiced plosives [b, d, dz, g, gʷ, ɢ] are allophones of the unvoiced plosives /p, t, ts, k, kʷ, q/ and occur before vowels. Modern Nisgaʼa orthography writes the voiced plosives with their own characters b, d, j, g, gw, g̠ respectively.

== See also ==
- Nisgaʼa
- Gitxsan language
