= Nisgaʼa =

Indigenous people in British Columbia

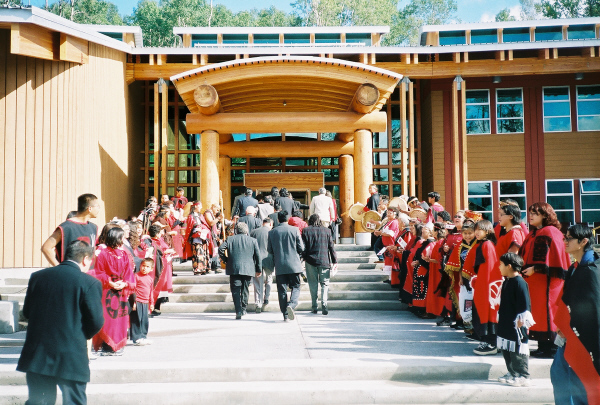
- Nisgaʼa community members and officials at the dedication of their new government building in 2000

Total population
- 5,495 (2016 census)

Regions with significant populations
- Canada (British Columbia)

Languages
- English • Nisgaʼa

Related ethnic groups
- Gitxsan

- People: Nisg̱aʼa
- Language: Nisqáʔamq
- Country: Nisg̱aʼa La̱xyip

The Nisgaʼa (English: /ˈnɪsɡɑː/; Nisga'a: Nisg̱aʼa [nisqaʔa]), formerly spelled Nishga or Niska, are an Indigenous people in British Columbia, Canada. They reside in the Nass River valley of northwestern British Columbia. The origin of the term Niska is uncertain. The spelling Nishga is used by the Nishga Tribal Council, and some scholars claim that the term means 'people of the Nass River'. The name is a reduced form of [naːsqaʔ], which is a loan word from Tongass Tlingit, where it means 'people of the Nass River'.

The official languages of Nisg̱aʼa are the Nisg̱aʼa language and English.

== Culture ==
=== Social Organization ===
Nisgaʼa society is organized into four tribes:

- Ganhada (G̱anada, Raven)
- Gisḵʼaast (Gisḵʼaast, Killer Whale)
- Laxgibuu (Lax̱gibuu, Wolf)
- Laxsgiik (Lax̱sgiik, Eagle)

Each tribe is further sub-divided into house groups – extended families with the same origins. Some houses are grouped together into clans – grouping of houses with same ancestors. Example:

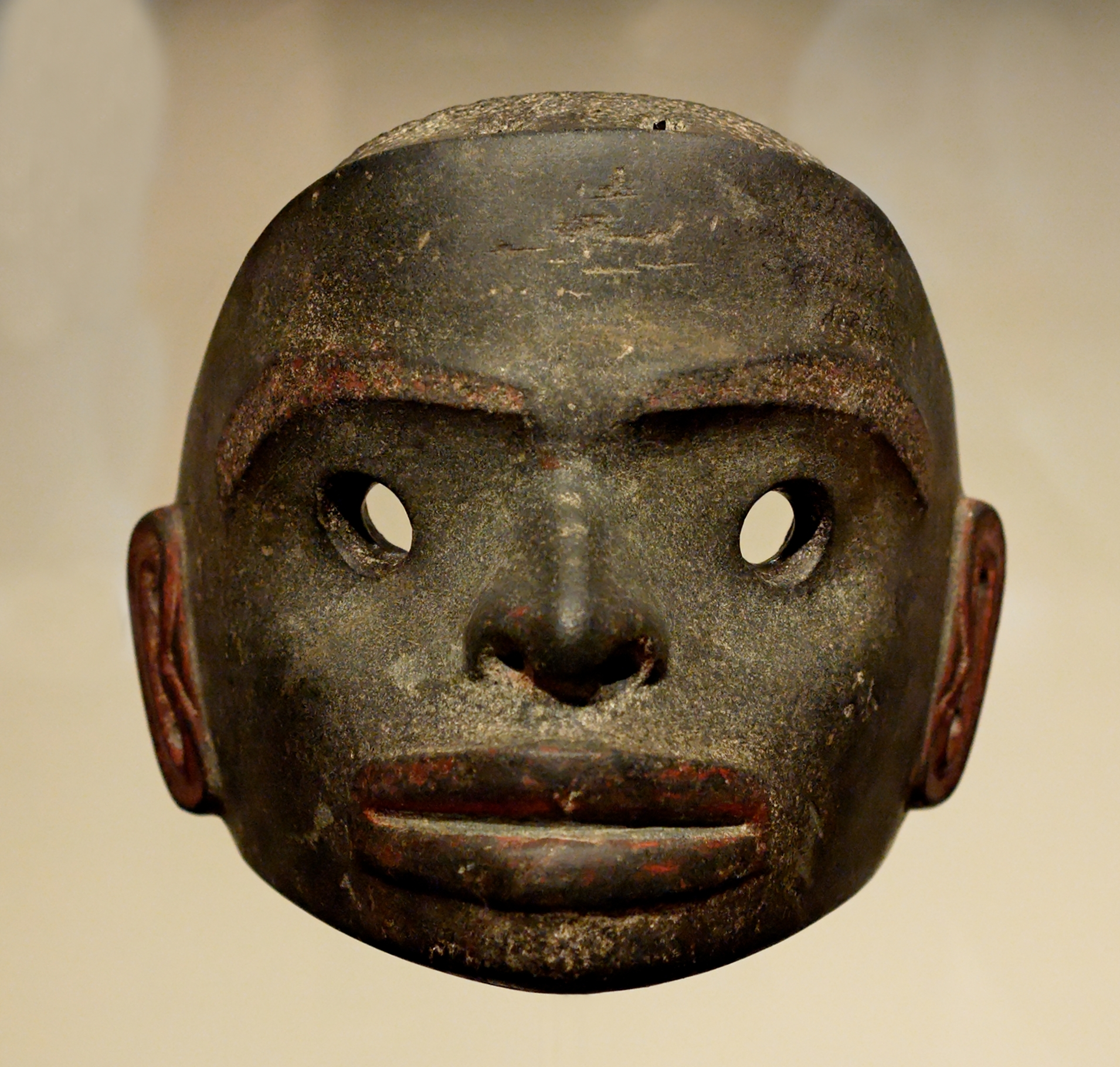
Mask with open eyes, worn during winter halait ceremonies, 18th–early 19th century

- Lax̱gibuu Tribe (Wolf Tribe)
  - Gitwilnaakʼil Clan (People Separated but of One)
    - House of Bax̱k'ap
    - House of Kʼeex̱kw
    - House of Gwingyoo
    - House of Duuḵ

=== Traditional cuisine ===
The Nisgaʼa traditionally harvest "sea food" all year round. This might include razor clams, mussels, oysters, limpets, scallops, abalone, fish, seaweed and other seafood that can be harvested from the shore. They also harvest salmon, cod, char, pike, trout and other freshwater fish from the streams, and hunt seals, fish and sea lion. The grease of the oolichan fish (Thaleichthys pacificus) is sometimes traded with other tribes, though nowadays this is more usually in a ceremonial context. They hunt mountain goat, marmot, game birds and more in the forests. The family works together to cook and process the meat and fish, roasting or boiling the former. They eat fish and sea mammals in frozen, boiled, dried or roasted form. The heads of a type of cod, often gathered half-eaten by sharks, are boiled into a soup that, according to folklore, helps prevent colds. The Nisga′a also trade dried fish, seal oil, fish oil, blubber and cedar.

=== Traditional houses ===
The traditional houses of the Nisgaʼa are shaped as large rectangles, made of cedar planks with cedar shake roofs, and oriented with the doors facing the water. The doors are usually decorated with the family crest. Inside, the floor is dug down to hold the hearth and conserve temperature. Beds and boxes of possessions are placed around the walls. Prior to the mid-twentieth century, around three or four extended families might live in one house; this is nowadays an uncommon practice. Masks and blankets might decorate the walls.

=== Traditional clothing ===
Prior to European colonization, men wore nothing in the summer, normally the best time to hunt and fish. Women wore skirts made of softened cedar bark and went topless. During the colder season, men wore cedar bark skirts (shaped more like a loincloth), a cape of cedar bark, and a basket hat outside in the rain, but wore nothing inside the house. Women wore basket hats and cedar blankets indoors and outdoors. Both sexes made and wore shell and bone necklaces. They rubbed seal blubber into their hair, and men kept their hair long or in a top knot. During warfare, men wore red cedar armour, a cedar helmet, and cedar loincloths. They wielded spears, clubs, harpoons, bows and slings. Wicker shields were common.

=== Calendar/life ===
The Nisgaʼa calendar revolves around harvesting of foods and goods used. The original year followed the various moons throughout the year.

- Hoobiyee: Like a Spoon (February/March). This is the traditional time to celebrate the new year, also known as Hoobiyee. (Variations of spelling include: Hobiyee, Hobiiyee, Hoobiiyee)
- X̱saak: To Eat Oolichan (March). The oolichan return to the Nass River the end of February/beginning of March. They are the first food harvested after the winter, which marks the beginning of the harvesting year.
- Mmaal: To Use Canoes Again (April). The ice begins to break on the river, allowing for canoes to be used again
- Yansaʼalt: Leaves Are Blooming (May). The leaves begin to flourish once again
- Misoʼo: Sockeye Salmon (June). Sockeye salmon are harvested
- X̱maay: To Eat Berries (July). various berries are harvested
- Wii Hoon: Great Salmon (August). Great amounts of salmon are harvested
- Genuugwiikw: Trail of the Marmot (September). Small game such as marmots are hunted
- X̱laaxw: To Eat Trout (October). Trout are the main staple for this month
- Gwilatkw: To Blanket (November). The earth is "Blanketed" with snow
- Luutʼaa: To Sit (December). The sun is sitting in one spot
- Ḵʼaliiyee: To Walk North (January). This time of year, the sun begins to go north (Kʼalii) again
- Buxwlaks: To Blow Around (February). Blow around refers to the amount of wind during this time of year

== Geography ==
Approximately 2,000 people live in the Nass Valley. Another 5,000 Nisgaʼa live elsewhere in Canada, predominantly within the three urban societies noted in the section below.

=== Nisgaʼa villages ===
The Nisgaʼa people number about 7,000. In British Columbia, the Nisgaʼa Nation is represented by four villages:

- Gitlaxtʼaamiks (formerly New Aiyansh) – nearly 800
- Gitwinksihlkw (formerly Canyon City) – approximately 200
- Lax̱g̱altsʼap (formerly Greenville) – more than 500
- Ging̱olx (formerly Kincolith) – almost 400

=== Nisgaʼa diaspora ===
Many Nisgaʼa people have moved to cities for their opportunities. Concentrations are found in three urban areas outside traditional Nisgaʼa territory:

- Terrace
- Prince Rupert/Port Edward
- Vancouver – there are approximately 1,500 Nisgaʼa in Vancouver, and others elsewhere in the Lower Mainland.

== Treaty ==
On August 4, 1998, a land-claim was settled between the Nisgaʼa, the government of British Columbia, and the Government of Canada. As part of the settlement in the Nass River valley, nearly 2,000 km^{2} (770 sq mi) of land was officially recognized as Nisgaʼa, and a 300,000 dam^{3} (240,000 acre⋅ft) water reservation was also created. Bear Glacier Provincial Park was also created as a result of this agreement. The land-claim's settlement was the first formal treaty signed by a First Nation in British Columbia since the Douglas Treaties in 1854 (Vancouver Island) and Treaty 8 in 1899 (northeastern British Columbia). The land owned collectively is under internal pressures from the Nisgaʼa people to turn it over into a system of individual ownership. This would have an effect on the rest of Canada in regards to First Nations lands.

== History ==
The Tseax Cone in a valley above and east of the Ksi Sii Aks (formerly Tseax River) was the source for an eruption during the 18th century that killed approximately 2,000 Nisgaʼa people from poisonous volcanic gases.

== Government ==
The government bodies of the Nisgaʼa include the Nisgaʼa Lisims government, the government of the Nisgaʼa Nation, and the Nisgaʼa village governments, one for each of the four Nisgaʼa villages. The Nisgaʼa Lisims government (Nisga'a: Wilp SiʼAyuukhl Nisgaʼa) is in the Nisgaʼa Lisims Government Building in Gitlaxt'aamiks.

Office	English name	Nisgaʼa name	Tribe
President	Eva Clayton	Yats	G̱anada
Secretary-treasurer	Charles Morven	Daax̱heet	G̱anada
Chairperson	Brian Tait	Gadim Sbayt Gan	G̱anada
Chairperson Council of Elders	Alvin Azak	Lik’in̓iskw	Gisḵ’aast
Chief councillors	Claude Barton, Sr, Ging̱olx	Gwak’aans	Lax̱sgiik
Chief councillors	Sheldon Martin, Lax̱g̱altsʼap	G̱anim Ts’im Aws	Gisḵ’aast
Chief councillors	Elaine Moore, Gitwinksihlkw	Ksim W̓ii Lingit	Lax̱gibuu
Chief councillors	Calvin Morven, Gitlax̱tʼaamiks	W̓ii Litsx̱kw	Lax̱gibuu
Nisg̱aʼa urban local representatives	Andrea Doolan, Tsʼamiks – Vancouver	Guudaad	Lax̱sgiik
Nisg̱aʼa urban local representatives	Travis Angus, Tsʼamiks – Vancouver	Niʼismiou	Laxgibuu
Nisg̱aʼa urban local representatives	Keith Azak, Gitlax̱dax – Terrace		Laxsgiik
Nisg̱aʼa urban local representatives	Maryanne Stanley, Gitlax̱dax – Terrace		Giskʼaast
Nisg̱aʼa urban local representatives	Clifford Morgan, Gitmax̱maḵʼay – Prince Rupert/Port Edward	Haym̓aas	G̱anada
Nisg̱aʼa urban local representatives	Juanita Parnell, Gitmax̱maḵʼay – Prince Rupert/Port Edward		Laxsgiik

== Museum ==
In 2011 the Nisg̱aʼa Museum, a project of the Nisgaʼa Lisims government, opened in Lax̱g̱altsʼap. It contains many historical artifacts of the Nisgaʼa people returned after many decades in major museums beyond the Nass Valley.

== Prominent Nisgaʼa ==
- Jordan Abel, poet
- Frank Arthur Calder, Sim'oogit Wii Lisims hereditary chief, treaty negotiator, rights activist, legislator, president emeritus Nisgaʼa Lisims Government
- Joseph Gosnell, hereditary chief Sim'oogit Hleek, treaty negotiator, former President Nisgaʼa Lisims Government
- Norman Tait, hereditary chief – Sim'oogit G̱awaaḵ of wilp Luuya'as, master carver
- Ron Telek, of Laxsgiik wilp Luuya'as, carver
- Larry McNeil, Tlingit-Nisgaʼa photographer
- Da-ka-xeen Mehner, Tlingit/Nisgaʼa photographer and installation artist
- Patrick Robert Reid Stewart, architect

== See also ==
- Nisg̱aʼa Highway
- Nisg̱aʼa Memorial Lava Bed Provincial Park
- School District 92 Nisgaʼa
- Nisgaʼa and Haida Crest Poles of the Royal Ontario Museum
