= Vetter Peak =

Mountain in British Columbia, Canada

- Xhlawit
- Location within British Columbia
- Interactive map of Vetter Peak

Highest point
- Elevation: 2,100 m (6,889 ft)
- Coordinates: 55°06′03″N 129°12′08″W

Geography
- Country: Canada
- Province: British Columbia
- District: Cassiar Land District
- Parent range: Kitimat Ranges
- Topo map: NTS 103P3 Tseax River

Vetter Peak is a 2,100-metre (6,889-foot) mountain summit located in British Columbia, Canada.

== Description ==
Vetter Peak is a triple-peaked mountain in Cassiar Land District and is part of the Kitimat Ranges of the Coast Mountains. It is situated 14 kilometres (8.7 miles) southwest of New Aiyansh and about 9 kilometres (5.6 miles) north of Alder Peak, the nearest higher peak. Precipitation runoff and glacial meltwater from the northern and western slopes drain to the headwaters of Vetter Creek and Ansedagan Creek, respectively. A pond immediately southwest of the peak drains into Alder Creek which has its headwaters on the northern slope of Alder Peak. Vetter Peak is separated from the Nass Ranges of the Hazelton Mountains in the east by the Tseax River valley. Northwest of Vetter Peak is the junction of the Nass and Tseax rivers.

== Etymology ==
Vetter Peak is one of four sacred mountains sacred to the Nisga'a people; they survived on the peak during the Great Flood. The name of the peak was adopted in the 1930 BC Gazetteer. Vetter Peak was subsequently renamed to Xhlawit on May 11, 2000, in accordance to the Nisga'a Treaty. According to Sigidimnak' Angaye'e, a Nisga'a elder, "the shape of the mountain peak is likened to a xhlaawim gan/ a V-shaped stem or limb of a tree."

== Climate ==
Based on the Köppen climate classification, Vetter Peak is located in the marine west coast climate zone of western North America. Most weather fronts originate in the Pacific Ocean, and travel east toward the Coast Mountains where they are forced upward by the range (Orographic lift), causing them to drop their moisture in the form of rain or snowfall. As a result, the Coast Mountains experience high precipitation, especially during the winter months in the form of snowfall. Winter temperatures can drop below −20 °C with wind chill factors below −30 °C. This climate supports unnamed glaciers surrounding Vetter Peak.

== See also ==
- List of mountains of British Columbia
