= Vetter Creek =

- Mouth of Vetter Creek

Location
- Country: Canada
- Province: British Columbia
- District: Cassiar Land District

Physical characteristics
- Source: Xhlawit
  - location: Coast Mountains
  - coordinates: 55°6′33″N 129°12′19″W
  - elevation: 1,533 m (5,030 ft)
- Mouth: Nass River
  - coordinates: 55°12′26″N 129°9′15″W
  - elevation: 30 m (98 ft)
- Length: 17 km (11 mi)
- Basin size: 72.5 km^{2} (28.0 sq mi),
- Discharge
  - average: 2.17 m^{3}/s (77 cu ft/s)

Basin features
- Topo map: NTS103P3 Tseax River

Vetter Creek is a tributary of the Nass River in the northern part of the province of British Columbia, Canada.

From its source at Xhlawit (formerly "Vetter Mountain"), Vetter Creek flows generally east and north for roughly 17 km (11 mi) to join the Nass River near the Nisga'a communities of Gitwinksihlkw and Gitlaxt'aamiks (formerly "Canyon City" and "New Aiyansh" respectively).

Vetter Creek's watershed covers 72.5 km^{2} (28.0 sq mi). The lower part of the drainage basin near the creek's mouth is within Nisga'a Memorial Lava Bed Corridor Protected Area, which adjoins Nisga'a Memorial Lava Bed Provincial Park and was established as part of the Nisga'a Treaty.

The creek's mean annual discharge is estimated at 2.17 m^{3}/s (77 cu ft/s). The mouth of Vetter Creek is located about 4.5 km (2.8 mi) west of Gitlaxt'aamiks ("New Aiyansh"), about 125 km (78 mi) northeast of Prince Rupert, British Columbia, about 435 km (270 mi) northwest of Prince George, British Columbia, about 155 km (96 mi) east of Ketchikan, Alaska; about 780 km (480 mi) north of Vancouver, British Columbia, and about 465 km (289 mi) southeast of Juneau, Alaska. Vetter Creek's watershed's land cover is classified as 50.9% conifer forest, 18.9% barren, 11.9% shrubland, 8.7% snow/glacier, and small amounts of other cover.

Most of Vetter Creek's drainage basin lies within the territory of the Nisga'a First Nation, or within Nisga'a Memorial Lava Bed Provincial Park (Nisga'a: Anhluut'ukwsim Lax̲mihl Angwinga'asankswhl Nisg̲a'a). The park is jointly managed by the provincial government and the Nisga'a Nation.

== Geography ==
The headwaters of Vetter Creek flow from glaciers on the north slope of the mountain Xhlawit. Its tributaries flow from the high peaks near Xhlawit. Vetter Creek flows generally north to the Nass River.

The drainage system of Vetter Creek and the nearby Ksi Sii Aks (Tseax River) was radically altered by a lava flow in the 18th century. Lava from the Tseax Cone volcano blocked and filled parts of the Tseax Valley, covered lower Vetter Creek and the Vetter alluvial fan where the creek used to enter the Nass River. The lava also altered the Nass River. The lava forced Ksi Sii Aks and Vetter Creek to abandon their alluvial channels, forming a new, more chaotic drainage system with multiple channels, anabranching patterns, numerous pools and small lakes, subsurface flow beneath the lava in places, and other fluvial complexities.

Vetter Creek flows into a complex series of pools and wetlands as it reaches the lava field. Some side channels of Ksi Sii Aks also flow into this area during high water season. Vetter Creek flows over the lava for about 800 m (2,600 ft) before entering a series of sinkholes. Since the lava reaches the southern bank of the Nass River, Vetter Creek only emerges from beneath the lava where it empties into the Nass.

Vetter Creek's lower course is roughly parallel to Ksi Sii Aks. The drainage of both streams is chaotic due to the lava field, with pools, wetlands, and side channels that can change seasonally and are slowly establishing new routes through the lava. A side branch of Ksi Sii Aks flows over Vetter Falls, called Ts’itksim Aks in Nisga'a, and by the Nisga’a Memorial Lava Bed Park Campground before entering a chaotic series of pools at the edge of the lava field.

== History ==
The Tseax Cone volcano, along lower Crater Creek, was the source of an eruption during the 18th century that killed approximately 2,000 Nisga'a people from poisonous volcanic gases, and at least three villages were destroyed, making it one of the most deadly natural disasters known in Canadian history.

== See also ==
- List of rivers of British Columbia
