= Oscar Peak =

Mountain summit in British Columbia, Canada

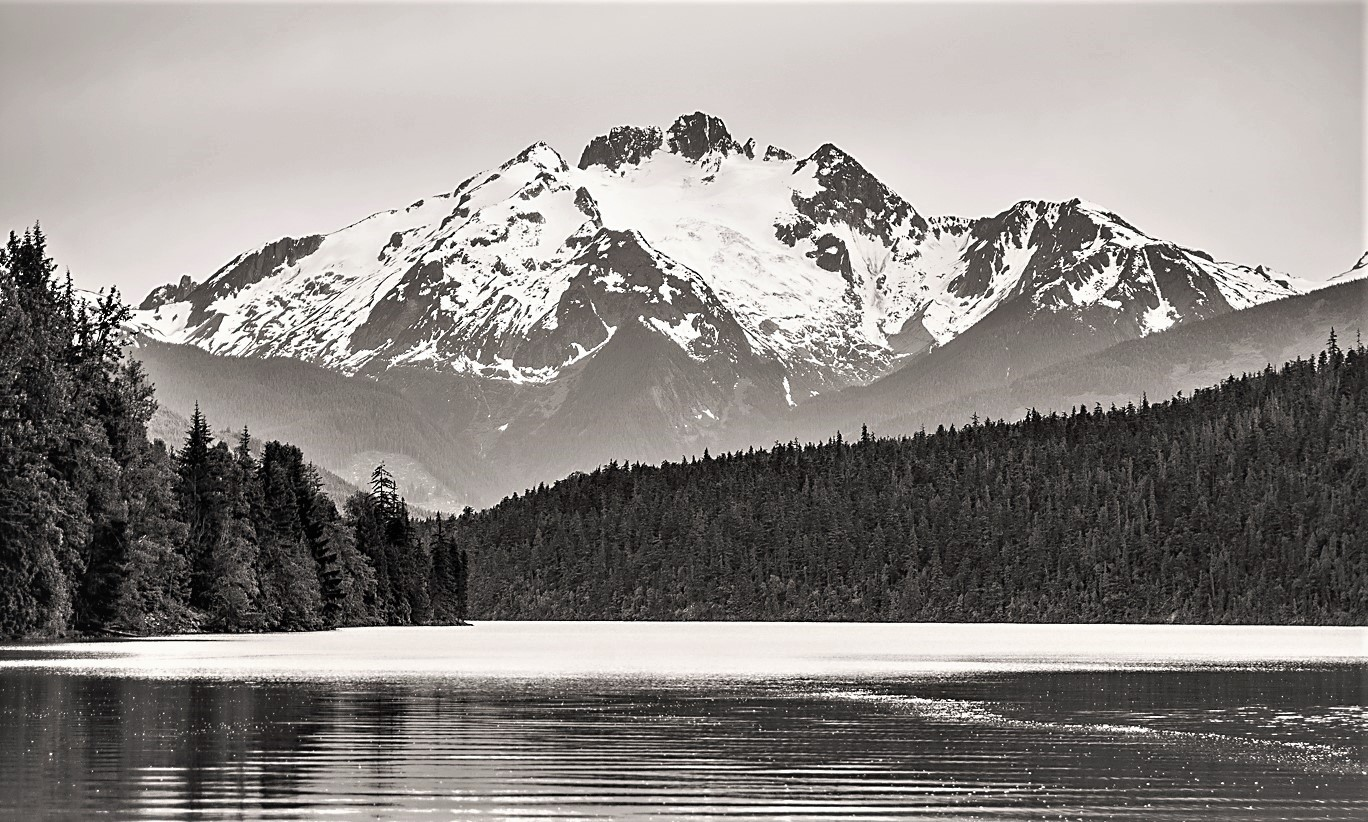
- North aspect

Highest point
- Elevation: 2,336 m (7,664 ft)
- Prominence: 2,099 m (6,886 ft)
- Isolation: 35.48 km (22.05 mi)
- Listing: Mountains of British Columbia; Major summits of Canada; Prominent summits of Canada; Isolated major summits of Canada
- Coordinates: 54°55′44″N 129°03′34″W

Naming
- Etymology: Oscar Olander

Geography
- Location within British Columbia Location within Canada
- Interactive map of Oscar Peak
- Country: Canada
- Province: British Columbia
- District: Range 5 Coast Land District
- Parent range: Kitimat Ranges; Coast Mountains
- Topo map: NTS 103I14 Oscar Peak

Oscar Peak is a 2,336-metre (7,664-foot) mountain summit located in British Columbia, Canada.

== Description ==
Oscar Peak is part of the Kitimat Ranges of the Coast Mountains. It is situated 55 km (34 mi) north-northwest of Terrace and 35 km (22 mi) south-southwest of Mount Priestley, the nearest higher peak. Precipitation runoff and glacial meltwater from the northern slope drains to headwaters of Ksi Sii Aks (formerly Tseax River), and the south side of the peak drains into tributaries of the Cedar River. Oscar Peak is more notable for its steep rise above local terrain than for its absolute elevation. Topographic relief is significant as the summit rises 1,300 meters (4,265 feet) above Hadenschild Creek in 2 kilometers (1.2 miles). This prominent mountain is visible from southbound on the Nisga'a Highway (Highway 113) at Lava Lake.

== Etymology ==
The peak's name refers to Oscar Olander (1882–1947), who settled in this area in about 1900. A geographic survey party so-named the peak after Mr. Olander as appreciation for the lodging he provided for them. He was killed in a logging accident when a load of logs rolled on him. The mountain's toponym was officially adopted on November 4, 1948, by the Geographical Names Board of Canada.

== Climate ==
Based on the Köppen climate classification, Oscar Peak is located in the marine west coast climate zone of western North America. Most weather fronts originate in the Pacific Ocean, and travel east toward the Coast Mountains where they are forced upward by the range (Orographic lift), causing them to drop their moisture in the form of rain or snowfall. As a result, the Coast Mountains experience high precipitation, especially during the winter months in the form of snowfall. Winter temperatures can drop below −20 °C with wind chill factors below −30 °C. This climate supports unnamed glaciers surrounding Oscar Peak.

== Gallery ==
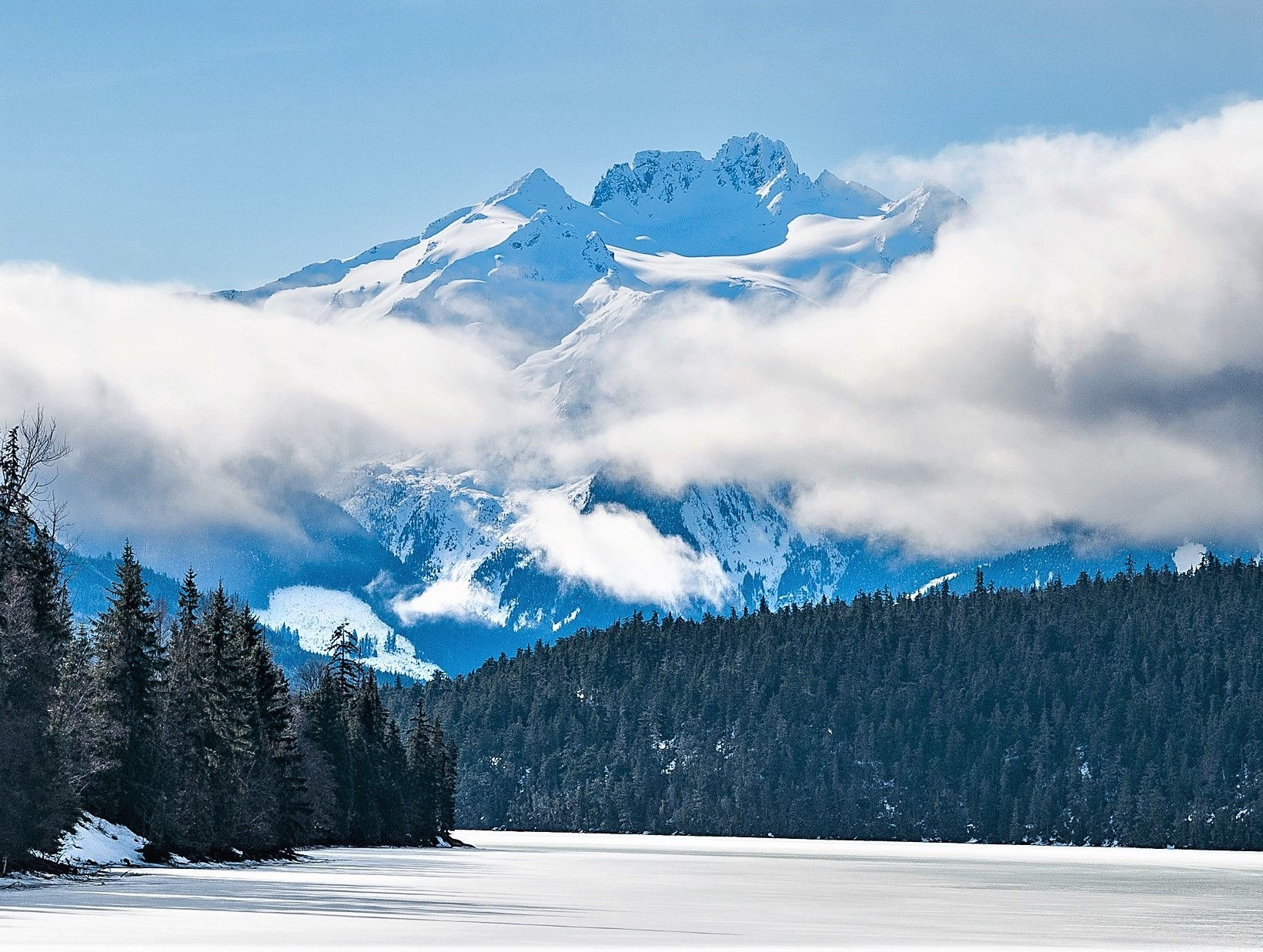
Oscar Peak in winter with frozen Lava Lake

== See also ==
- Geography of British Columbia
