= Crater Creek =

- Mouth of Crater Creek

Location
- Country: Canada
- Province: British Columbia
- District: Cassiar Land District

Physical characteristics
- Source: Mount Philippa
  - location: Coast Mountains
  - coordinates: 55°11′4″N 128°51′20″W
  - elevation: 1,425 m (4,675 ft)
- Mouth: Ksi Sii Aks
  - coordinates: 55°6′8″N 128°58′41″W
  - elevation: 200 m (660 ft)
- Length: 25 km (16 mi)
- Basin size: 104 km^{2} (40 sq mi),
- Discharge
  - average: 4.21 m^{3}/s (149 cu ft/s)

Basin features
- Topo map: NTS103P2 Lava Lake

Crater Creek is a tributary of Ksi Sii Aks (formerly "Tseax River") and part of the Nass River watershed in northern part of the province of British Columbia, Canada.

It flows generally south and west for roughly 25 km (16 mi) to join Ksi Aii Aks, which flows into Nass River near the community of Gitlaxt'aamiks (formerly "New Aiyansh"). Crater Creek's watershed covers 104 km^{2} (40 sq mi), and is mostly within the Nisga'a Memorial Lava Bed Protected Area and Nisga'a Memorial Lava Bed Provincial Park. The creek's mean annual discharge is estimated at 4.21 m^{3}/s (149 cu ft/s).

The mouth of Crater Creek is located about 122 km (76 mi) northeast of Prince Rupert, British Columbia, about 425 km (264 mi) northwest of Prince George, British Columbia, about 170 km (110 mi) east of Ketchikan, Alaska; about 760 km (470 mi) north of Vancouver, British Columbia, and about 485 km (301 mi) southeast of Juneau, Alaska. Crater Creek's watershed's land cover is classified as 45.5% conifer forest, 25.5% barren, 14.0% shrubland, and small amounts of other cover.

Crater Creek lies within the traditional territory of the Nisga'a First Nation. Most of the creek's drainage is in Nisga'a Memorial Lava Bed Provincial Park (Nisga'a: Anhluut'ukwsim Lax̲mihl Angwinga'asankswhl Nisg̲a'a), which was included in the Nisga'a Treaty in 2000. It was the first provincial park in British Columbia to be jointly managed by the government and a First Nation.

== Geography ==
Crater Creek originates in glaciers on the north slope of Mount Philippa. It flows north through an icy and barren land for about 2 km (1.2 mi) before turning west and entering shrublands and coniferous forests. After flowing west for about 3.5 km (2.2 mi) Crater Creek turns south, flowing through a valley between Mount Philippa on the east and other highlands of the Hazelton Mountains on the west.

The creek flows south for about 11 km (6.8 mi) before entering Melita Lake, after which the creek turns west. The volcanic vent Tseax Cone is just south of Melita Lake. After passing Tseax Cone the creek flows generally west through lava beds for about 6.5 km (4.0 mi). It passes just north of Lava Lake before passing under the Nisga'a Highway and joining Ksi Sii Aks, a tributary of the Nass River.

== History ==
The Tseax Cone, along lower Crater Creek, was the source of an eruption during the 18th century that killed approximately 2,000 Nisga'a people from poisonous volcanic gases, and at least three villages were destroyed, making it one of the most deadly natural disasters in Canadian history.

== See also ==
- List of rivers of British Columbia
