= Mount Priestley (British Columbia) =

Mountain in British Columbia, Canada

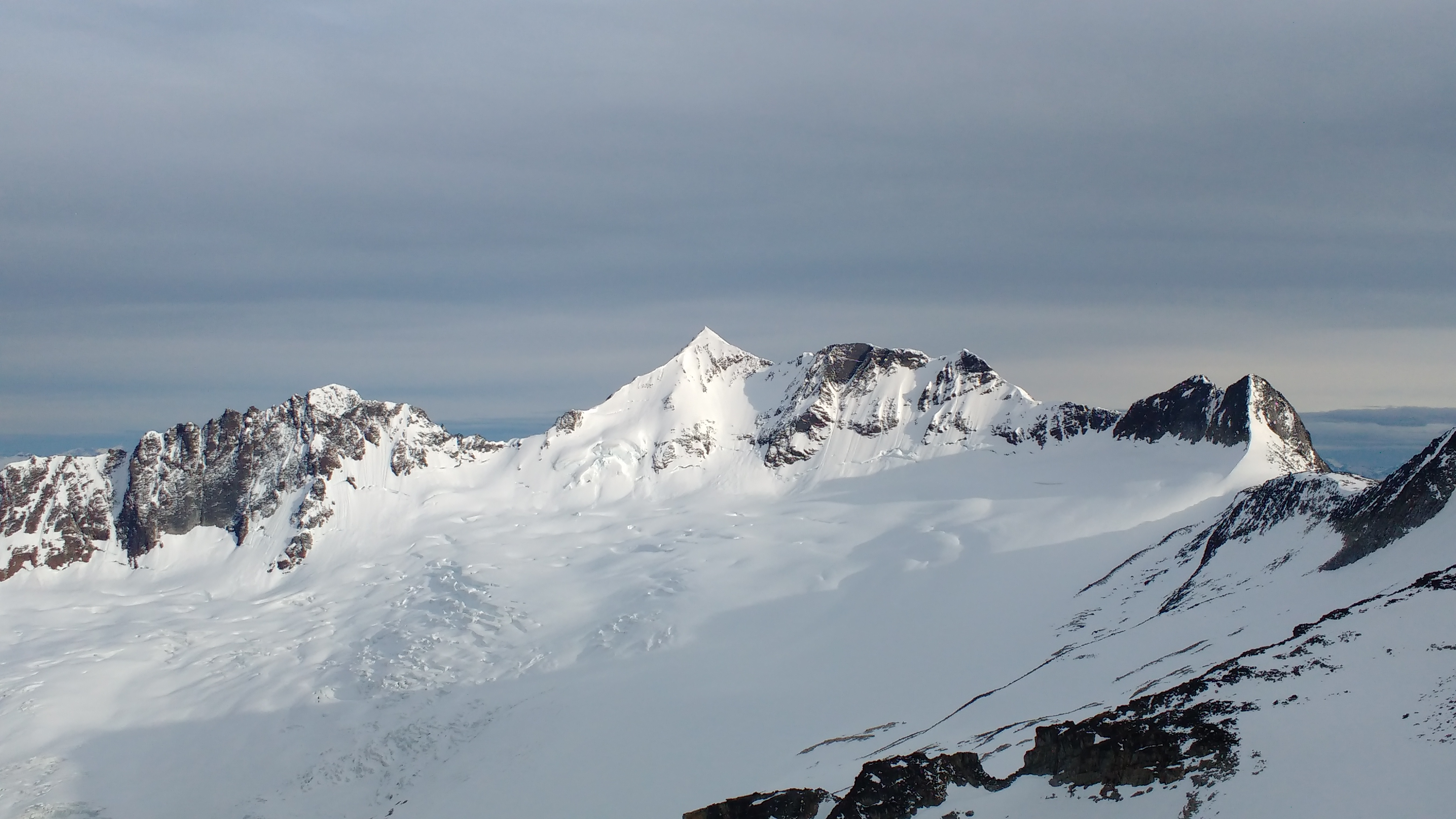
- North face of Mount Priestley and the East Ridge route

Highest point
- Elevation: 2,366 m (7,762 ft)
- Prominence: 1,945 m (6,381 ft)
- Listing: Mountains of British Columbia; Canada ultra-prominent peaks
- Coordinates: 55°13′46″N 128°52′33″W

Geography
- Location within British Columbia
- Location: British Columbia, Canada
- Parent range: Kitimat Ranges, Coast Mountains
- Topo map: NTS 103P2 Lava Lake

Climbing
- First ascent: June 20, 2017, by John Gill, Jordan Craven and Drew Copeland
- Easiest route: East Ridge

Mount Priestley is a mountain in the Kitimat Ranges of the Coast Mountains in northwestern British Columbia, Canada. It is located in the Cassiar Land District, northeast of Nisga'a Memorial Lava Bed Provincial Park.

The mountain has an elevation of 2,366 metres (7,762 ft) and a topographic prominence of 1,945 metres (6,381 ft), making it an ultra-prominent peak. Because of its large prominence above the surrounding terrain, Mount Priestley is one of the more topographically significant peaks in this part of the Coast Mountains.

== Geography ==
Mount Priestley rises above the Nass Valley region of northwestern British Columbia. The mountain is situated near the northeastern side of Nisga'a Memorial Lava Bed Provincial Park, an area known for its volcanic landscape and lava flows.

The peak is part of the Kitimat Ranges, a subdivision of the Coast Mountains. Its official coordinates are 55°13′46″N 128°52′33″W.

== Climbing history ==
Mount Priestley was first climbed on June 20, 2017, by John Gill, Jordan Craven and Drew Copeland. The party made the ascent by the east ridge, a route they named "The Steven".

The climb formed part of a four-day expedition. The climbers began from Nisga'a Memorial Lava Bed Provincial Park on June 18 and returned on June 21. According to Gripped, the approach involved old logging roads, cutblocks, an exposed ridge, glacier travel and steep snow and rock before the team reached the summit.

The 2017 ascent was reported as the first known ascent of the mountain.

== See also ==
- List of Ultras of North America
- List of mountains of British Columbia
- Kitimat Ranges
- Nisga'a Memorial Lava Bed Provincial Park
