= Melita Lake =

Shallow lake in British Columbia, Canada

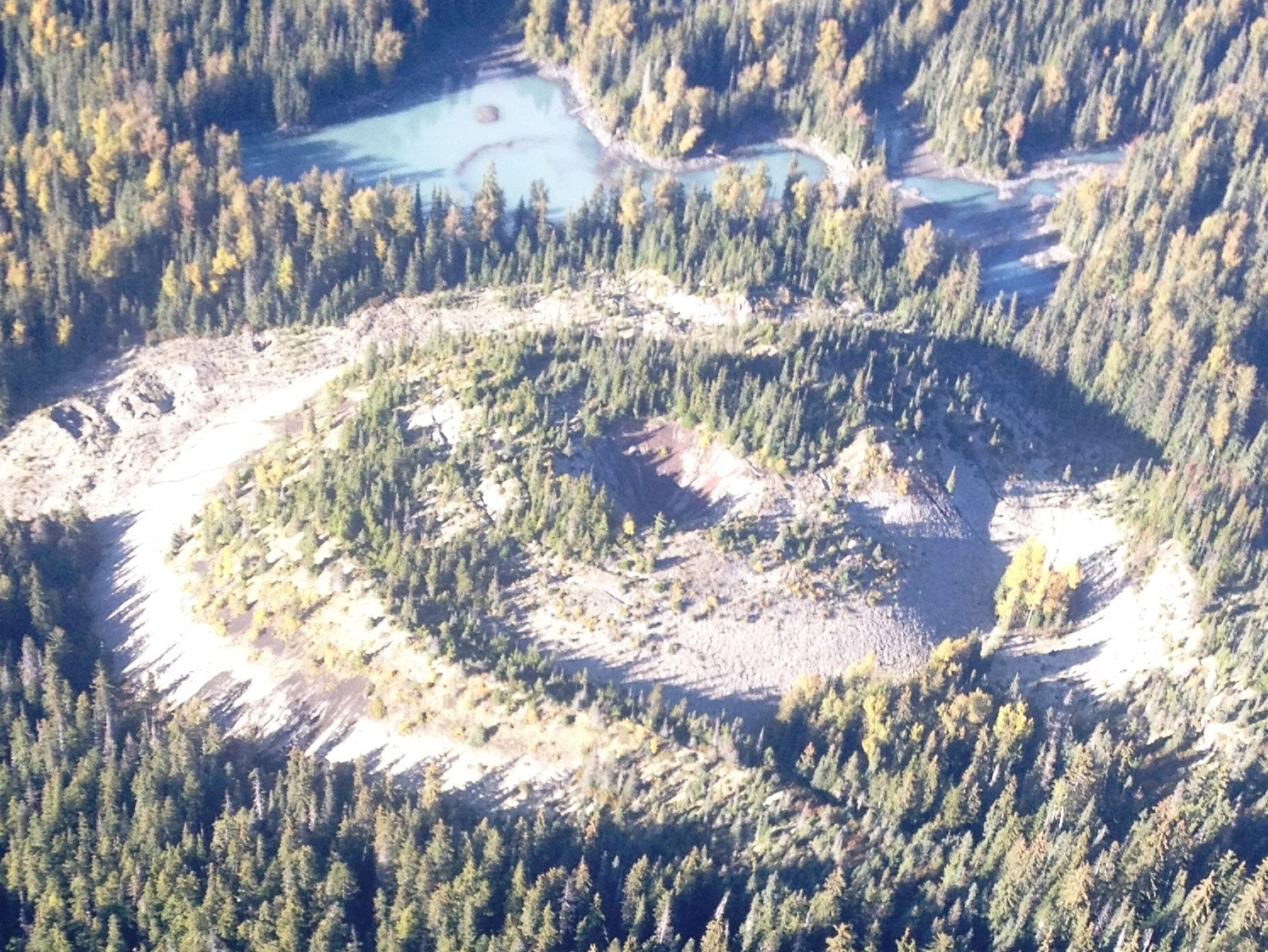
- Tseax Cone with Lower Melita Lake in the background

- Location within British Columbia
- Location: British Columbia, Canada
- Coordinates: 55°06′48″N 128°53′55″W
- Type: Volcanogenic
- Primary inflows: Crater Creek
- Primary outflows: Crater Creek
- Basin countries: Canada

Melita Lake, known to the Nisga'a as T’aam Baxhl Mihl, is a shallow lake in Nisga'a Memorial Lava Bed Provincial Park of northwestern British Columbia, Canada. Its primary inflow and outflow is Crater Creek, which flows west into the Tseax River. The elevation of Melita Lake varies from 550 to 551 m (1,804 to 1,808 ft).

Melita Lake consists of two segments that are informally called Upper Melita Lake and Lower Melita Lake. They are separated by a series of small and heavily vegetated islands that form part of a lava flow. The deepest part of Melita Lake measures approximately 3.5 m (11 ft) near its western shores, although its central and northeast shores also contain two deep spots.

Melita Lake formed after Crater Creek was dammed by lava from an eruption of Tseax Cone about 250 years ago. Exposed along the western and northern shores of Melita Lake are a series of collapsed lava blocks and agglutinated tree logs.

== See also ==
- List of lakes of British Columbia
