= Xnukw =

River in British Columbia

Xnukw Iknouk River
- Mouth of Xnukw

Location
- Country: Canada
- Province: British Columbia
- District: Cassiar Land District

Physical characteristics
- Source: Boundary Ranges
  - location: Coast Mountains
  - coordinates: 55°9′36″N 129°33′13″W
  - elevation: 1,147 m (3,763 ft)
- Mouth: Nass River
  - coordinates: 55°0′21″N 129°48′47″W
  - elevation: 0 m (0 ft)
- Length: 30 km (19 mi)
- Basin size: 111 km^{2} (43 sq mi),
- Discharge
  - average: 9.7 m^{3}/s (340 cu ft/s)

Basin features
- Topo map: NTS103P4 Greenville

Xnukw (English pronunciation: nook), formerly the Iknouk River, is a river in the northern coast part of the province of British Columbia, Canada. From its source in the Boundary Ranges of the Coast Mountains Xnukw flows southwest for about 30 km (19 mi) to empty into the lower Nass River near Nass Bay.

Xnukw's drainage basin covers 111 km^{2} (43 sq mi). The river's mean annual discharge is estimated at 9.7 m^{3}/s (340 cu ft/s). Xnukw's watershed's land cover is classified as 37.2% conifer forest, 25.4% barren, 12.1% grassland, 10.1% shrub, 9.3% snow/glacier, and small amounts of other cover. The mouth of Xnukw is located about 83 km (52 mi) north of Prince Rupert, about 77 km (48 mi) east of Ketchikan, Alaska, about 475 km (295 mi) west of Prince George, and about 785 km (488 mi) north of Vancouver.

The entire Xnukw's watershed is within the territory of the Nisga'a Nation as defined by the Nisga'a Treaty. The name "Xnukw" is from the Nisga'a language and means "place where spear (Chinook/spring salmon)", referencing a Nisga'a adaawak traditional story.

== Geography ==
The Xnukw river begins in the high peaks and glaciers of the Boundary Ranges of the Coast Mountains between the Nass River to the south and Observatory Inlet to the northwest. Its geologically new, glacier-made U-shaped valley runs in a nearly straight line to the southwest. The river Ksi Gingolx follows a similar southwest course, to the community of Ging̱olx, just west of Xnukw. Along its route Xnukw collects various small tributary streams flowing from highlands down into its valley. In its lower reach Xnukw flows between Sharp Peak on the east and Mount Woods on the west. At its mouth Xnukw flows under the Nisga'a Highway (British Columbia Highway 113), after which a final tributary creek joins Xnukw before it empties into the Nass River estuary, just upriver from where the Nass River becomes Nass Bay and joins Portland Inlet.

== History ==
The Xnukw has been Nisga'a territory since time immemorial. The Nisga'a adaawak (oral history story) about Xnukw tells of a young man named Wiit'ax Daaw who once fished at a big rock located in the middle of the mouth of the river. He caught a large Chinook salmon by the tail but was unable to let go of his spear and was pulled out to sea. A law was then made: "Never should anyone club the spring salmon on the head after catching it, for fear it will put a curse on you." No one has held the name Wiit'ax Daaw ever since.

The river was officially given the name "Iknouk River" by the government of British Columbia in 1953. Per the Nisga'a Treaty, its name was officially changed to "Xnukw" on 11 May 2000.

== Flora and fauna ==
The primary biogeoclimatic zone of the Xnukw watershed is "Coastal Western Hemlock" (CWH) zone, a conifer temperate rainforest dominated by western hemlock, western red cedar, and amabilis fir. At higher altitudes this zone merges into the "Mountain Hemlock" (MH) zone, characterized by the presence of mountain hemlock and the absence of red cedar.

Xnukw is a major salmon-bearing river.

== See also ==
- List of rivers of British Columbia
