= Joseph Gosnell =

Canadian tribal leader (1936–2020)

Joseph Arthur Gosnell Sr. CC OBC (June 21, 1936 – August 18, 2020) was a Canadian politician who led the Nisga'a people of northern British Columbia.

The son of Eli and Mary Gosnell, he was born at Arrandale Cannery, and grew up in the village of New Aiyansh.

He received his formal education at St. Michael's Residential School in Port Alberni, British Columbia. As a young man, he worked as a fisherman. He later served as band councillor and became active in the Native Brotherhood of British Columbia, of which he eventually became chairman. He was also a member of the Pacific Salmon Commission. He served for many years on the Nisga'a Tribal Council, of which he was elected President in 1992. In these various positions he was instrumental in bringing modern medical care, education, and resource management to the Nass River Valley. He was the chief Nisga'a representative in the negotiations that led to the signing of the Nisga'a Treaty on 4 August 1998, the first modern treaty between a British Columbian First Nation, Canada, and British Columbia. In November, 2000 he was elected President of the new Nisga'a Lisms government.

A fluent speaker of the Nisga'a language, he was a member of the Gitlaxt’aamiks Ceremonial Dancers, and held the noble name of Sim'oogit Hleek. He was married to the former Audrey Adele Munroe with whom he had seven children: Marilyn Arlene, Joseph Wayne, Sharon Marjorie, Theodore Allen, Frank Curtis, Keith Andrew and Kevin Wesley.

He had received four Honorary Doctorate of Laws degrees. One from Royal Roads University in Colwood, near Victoria on October 17, 1997; another from the Open Learning Agency in Burnaby on May 7, 1999; a third from Simon Fraser University in 2000; and the last from the University of Northern British Columbia on May 26, 2000. He received the Humanitarian Award from the Canadian Labour Congress in Toronto on May 6, 1999.

In 1999 he received the Order of British Columbia. In 2000, Chief Gosnell received the Lifetime Achievement Award from the National Aboriginal Achievement Foundation, now Indspire. In 2001, he was named an Officer of the Order of Canada and was promoted to Companion in 2006. In 2002 he received the Queen's Golden Jubilee Medal.

In 2012, he served as the first Visiting Distinguished Indigenous Scholar in Residence at the Vancouver School of Theology.

On May 31, 2019, he was sworn in as the University of Northern British Columbia's seventh Chancellor.
