= Tseax Cone =

Cinder cone in British Columbia, Canada

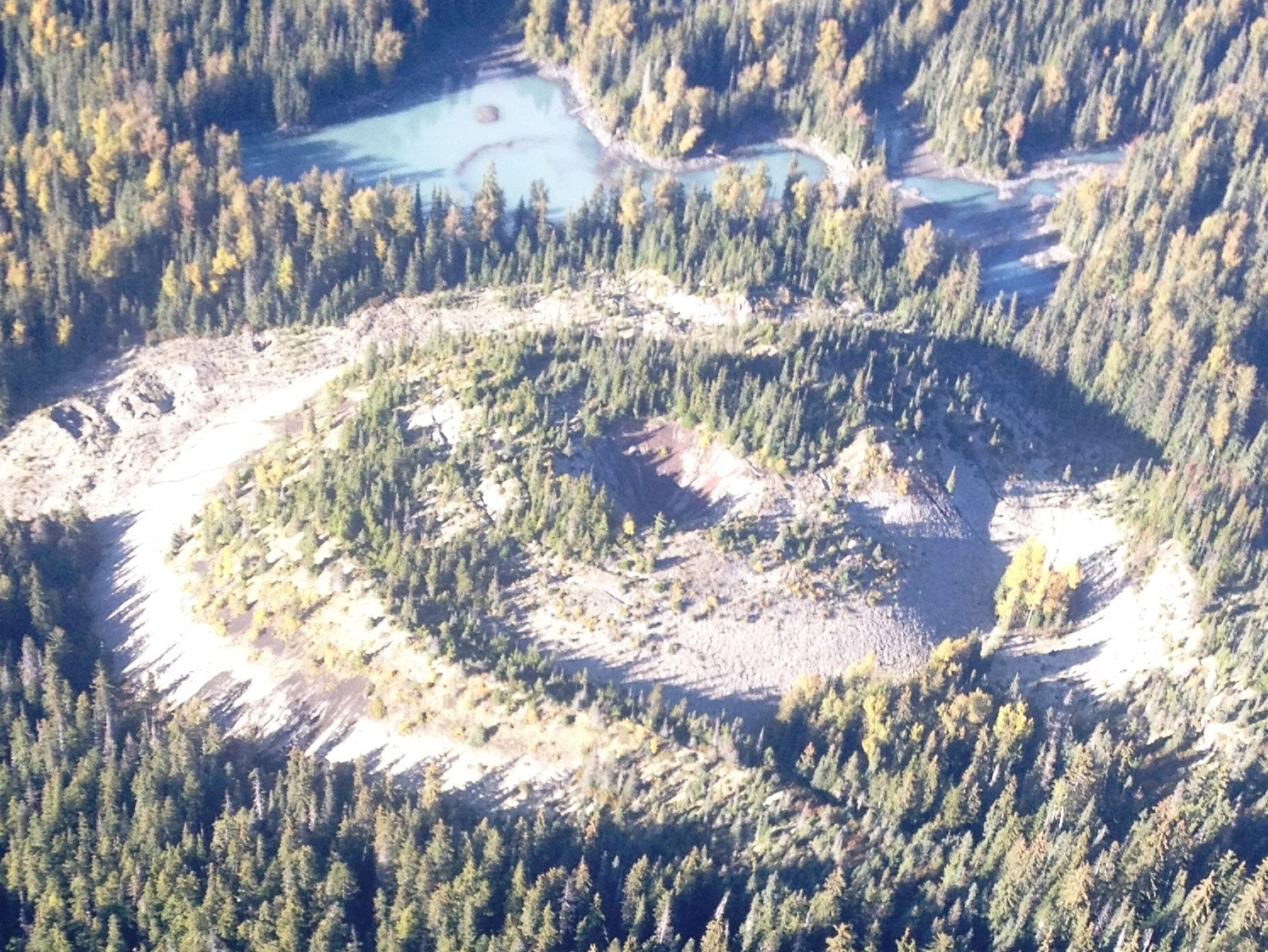
- Tseax Cone with Melita Lake in the background

Highest point
- Elevation: 609 m (1,998 ft)
- Coordinates: 55°06′38″N 128°53′56″W

Naming
- Etymology: Tseax River (Ksi Sii Aks)
- Native name: Wil Ksi Bax̱hl Mihl (Nisga'a)
- English translation: Where the Fire Ran Out

Geography
- Location in British Columbia
- Location in Nisga'a Memorial Lava Bed Park
- Country: Canada
- Province: British Columbia
- District: Cassiar Land District
- Protected area: Nisga'a Memorial Lava Bed Provincial Park
- Parent range: Nass Ranges
- Topo map: NTS 103P2 Lava Lake

Geology
- Rock age: Less than 800 years old
- Mountain type: Cinder cone
- Rock type(s): Basanite and trachybasalt
- Volcanic zone: Northern Cordilleran Province
- Last eruption: 1690 ± 150 years

Tseax Cone (/ˈsiːæks/ SEE-aks) is a small volcano in the Nass Ranges of the Hazelton Mountains in northwestern British Columbia, Canada. It has an elevation of 609 metres (1,998 feet) and lies within an east–west valley through which a tributary of the Tseax River flows. The volcano consists of two nested structures and was the source of four lava flows that descended into neighbouring valleys. A secondary eruptive centre lies just north of Tseax Cone on the opposite side of Melita Lake. It probably formed simultaneously with Tseax Cone, but the timing of volcanism at the two eruptive centres is not precisely known; both were formed by volcanic activity sometime in the last 800 years.

The exact timing of volcanism at Tseax Cone has been a subject of controversy because there are no direct written accounts; radiocarbon dating of plants killed by lava or ejecta from the volcano has yielded ages as old as 625 ± 70 years to as young as 190 ± 15 years. There is also controversy over whether the volcano was formed during one or more distinct episodes of eruptive activity. The single eruptive episode hypothesis has been proposed by researchers as early as 1923 whereas a multi-eruption hypothesis was proposed in 1978. Most research suggests that Tseax Cone was formed during one episode of eruptive activity; new data supporting this hypothesis was reported in 2020.

Tseax Cone is the subject of legends told by the local Indigenous people. They describe the destruction of villages along the Nass River by the volcano and the death of several people from inhaling volcanic fumes, although other causes of death may have been involved. As many as 2,000 people are claimed to have been killed by an eruption from Tseax Cone; this would make it the deadliest geological disaster in Canada and the second-worst natural disaster in Canadian history by death toll. Tseax Cone has therefore been described as the deadliest volcano in Canada. Renewed eruptions from the volcano could start wildfires and block local streams with lava flows.

Tseax Cone lies within an ecoregion characterized by mountainous terrain and several streams. Rainforests occur at the volcano, as well as numerous species of mammals. Lichens and mosses cover most of the lava flows that have issued from Tseax Cone, although rainforests and waterbodies also obscure them. After at least 20 years of pleas for protection, the volcano and lava flows were established as Nisga'a Memorial Lava Bed Provincial Park in 1992. Tseax Cone and its lava flows can be accessed via provincial highways and backcountry roads.

== Names and etymology ==
Tseax Cone has been variously called Aiyansh Volcano, Aiyansh River Volcano, Tseax River Cone and Tseax Volcano. Aiyansh comes from a Nisga'a word meaning 'leafing early' or 'early leaves', whereas Tseax comes from a Nisga'a word meaning 'new water'. Tseax is possibly a reference to the disturbed drainage patterns of the Tseax River caused by a volcanic eruption from the cone. The well-established local name for the volcano, Tseax Cone, became official on December 13, 1991, and was adopted on the National Topographic System map 103P/2. To the local Nisga'a people, Tseax Cone is known as Wil Ksi Bax̱hl Mihl; in their language, it means 'Where the Fire Ran Out', which is a reference to the volcanic eruption that sent lava spewing out of the volcano.

== Geography ==
=== Location and climate ===
Tseax Cone is about 60 kilometres (37 miles) north of Terrace near the Nisga'a villages of Gitwinksihlkw and Gitlaxt'aamiks in Cassiar Land District of northwestern British Columbia, Canada. It lies within a steep-sided, 5 km (3.1 mi) long, east–west valley penetrating the Nass Ranges of the Hazelton Mountains. Tseax Cone is situated at the outlet of Melita Lake, an expansion of Crater Creek which flows west into the Tseax River. Crater Creek gets its name from being in association with Tseax Cone which is located on the eastern side of the creek. The Nass Mountains Ecosection is the main ecosection at the cone.

The area has a climate that is somewhat transitional between those of coastal and continental regimes. It is wetter than other areas in the Nass Ranges Ecoregion due to air entering from the Pacific Coast. Much of this Pacific air enters via the Skeena River valley or flows over the Kitimat Ranges, resulting in cloud cover and heavy rain. Short periods of extreme cold temperatures and deep snow occasionally occur as a result of cold Arctic air invading from the north.

=== Plants and animals ===
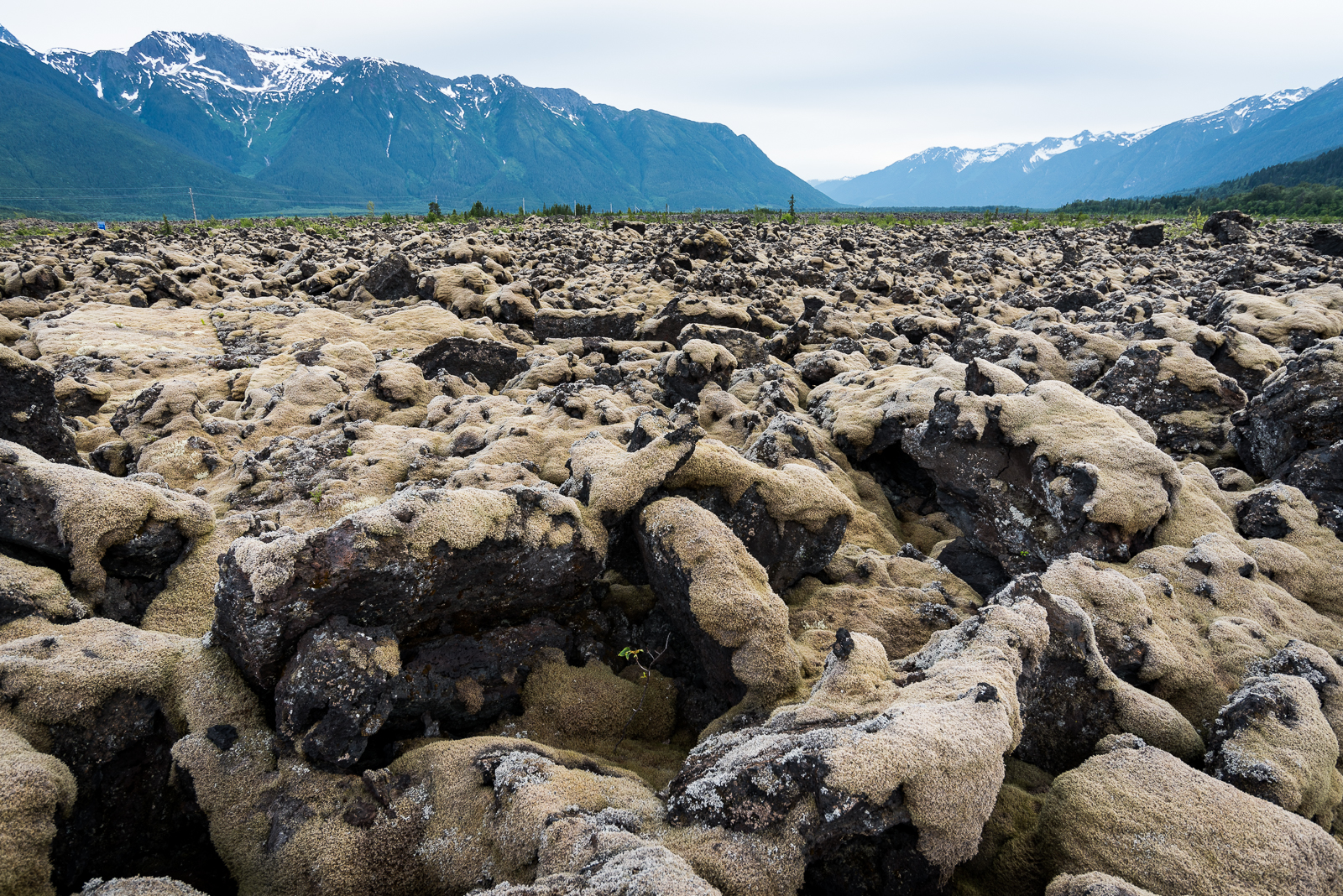
Moss-covered lava in Nass Valley

Lichens and mosses cover large portions of lava flows originating from Tseax Cone. They range in colour from green to yellow, reach thicknesses of a few centimetres and give the illusion that the lava flows are covered in fur. Also present on the lava flows in very small quantities are grasses and smaller shrubs. In the Tseax River valley, the lava flows have been almost completely covered by dense rainforest; coastal western hemlock and subalpine mountain hemlock form rainforests in the area. Wildlife in the area includes marmots, goats, bears and moose.

Despite being covered by lichens, mosses and rainforests, the lava flows are easily recognizable from aerial and satellite imagery, as well as field observations. However, this may change by the end of the 21st century as lodgepole pine and cottonwood forests continue to develop on the lava flows in an increasingly wetter and milder climate. The growth of these forests is bolstered by the deposition of silt on the lava flows by local streams, providing soil for vegetation.

== Geology and geomorphology ==
=== Background ===
Tseax Cone is one of the southernmost volcanoes in the Northern Cordilleran Volcanic Province. This is a broad area of shield volcanoes, lava domes, cinder cones and stratovolcanoes extending from northwestern British Columbia northwards through Yukon into easternmost Alaska. The dominant rocks compossing these volcanoes are alkali basalts and hawaiites, but nephelinites, basanites and peralkaline (Note: Peralkaline rocks are magmatic rocks that have a higher ratio of sodium and potassium to aluminum.) phonolites, trachytes and comendites are locally abundant. These rocks were deposited by volcanic eruptions from 20 million years ago to as recently as a few hundred years ago. Volcanism in the Northern Cordilleran Volcanic Province is thought to be due to rifting of the North American Cordillera, driven by changes in relative plate motion between the North American and Pacific plates.

=== Petrology ===
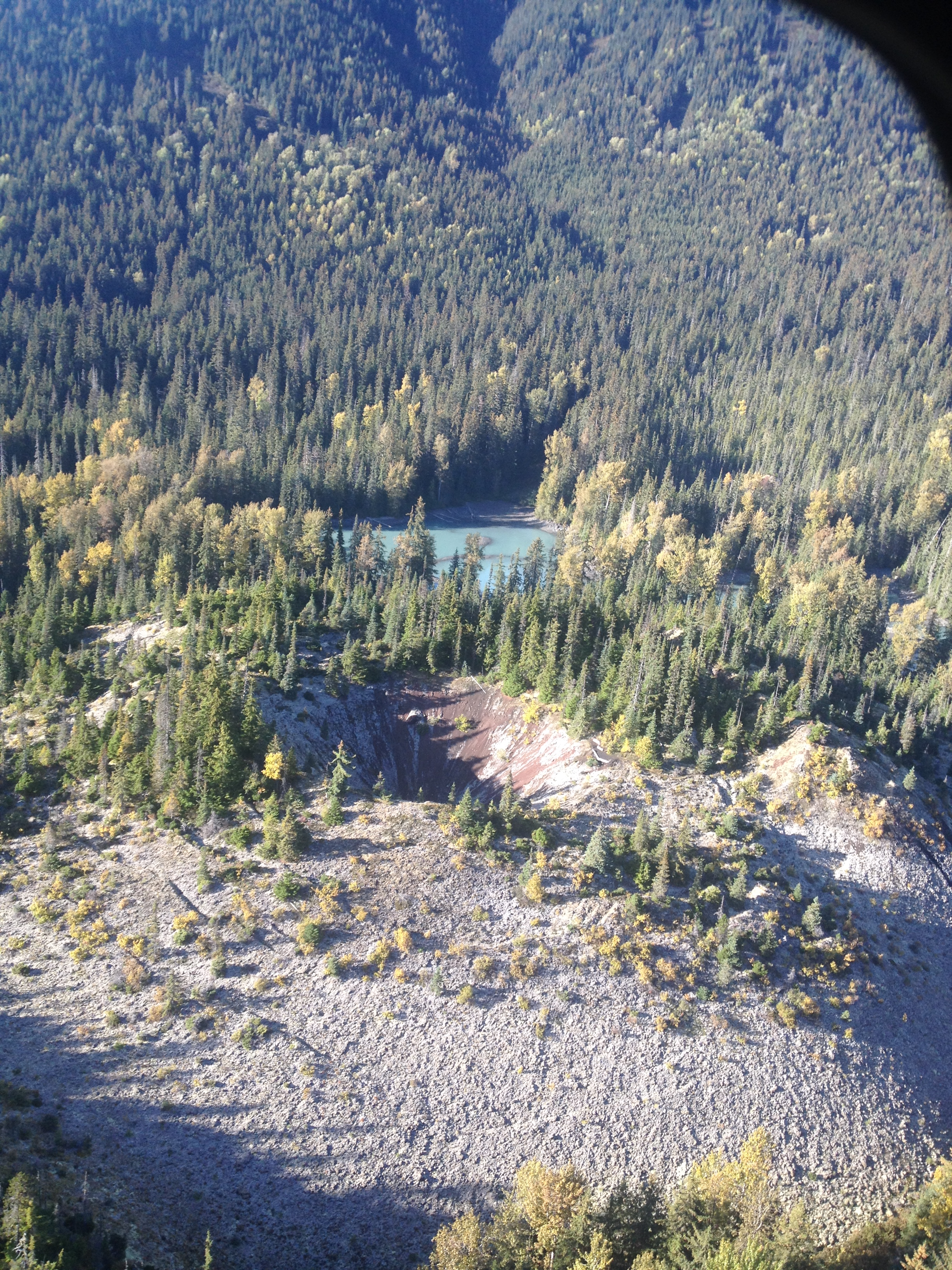
Tseax Cone from the southeast

Tseax Cone and its eruptive products are basanitic, trachybasaltic or alkali basaltic in composition. They are rich in iron-titanium oxides and were produced by a low degree of partial melting 55–62 km (34–39 mi) below the surface in the upper crust. Olivine, plagioclase and the iron-titanium oxides are in the form of phenocrysts (Note: Phenocrysts are large, conspicuous crystals in magmatic rocks with porphyritic texture.) whereas clinopyroxene occurs as a matrix mineral. The lack of clinopyroxene phenocrysts in Tseax Cone lavas is a phenomenon commonly observed in other mafic (Note: Mafic pertains to magmatic rocks that are relatively rich in iron and magnesium, relative to silicium.) lavas throughout the Northern Cordilleran Volcanic Province. Tseax Cone and its eruptive products rest unconformably on sedimentary rocks of the Bowser Lake Group, a geological group of Jurassic and Cretaceous age consisting of grey sandstones and dark grey and black conglomerates, siltstones and mudstones.

Lava and tephra from Tseax Cone cover about 36 km^{2} (14 mi^{2}) and have a total volume of around 0.5 km^{3} (0.12 mi^{3}); the volume of this volcanic material is similar to that produced during Mauna Loa's 1984 eruption and Kīlauea's fissure 8 eruption in 2018. The Tseax Cone lavas are thought to have been emplaced at high speed during a short period of time, which may have been partially due to eruption rate and topography. Their liquidus viscosities are comparable to basalts of Mount Etna and the Hawaiian Islands, as well as the foidite lavas of Mount Nyiragongo and the tephrite lavas of Nyamuragira. It is possible that the lava erupted from Tseax Cone rose along the same faults as those at the Lakelse Hot Springs south of Terrace, which are the hottest geothermal springs in Canada.

=== Structure ===
Tseax Cone has an elevation of 609 m (1,998 ft) and consists of two nested structures: a smaller inner cone and a larger external spatter rampart. The younger inner cone is 65–75 m (213–246 ft) high and 290 m (950 ft) in diameter, consisting mainly of black ejecta such as scoria, ballistics and lapilli. It contains an approximately 33 m (108 ft) deep volcanic crater with a diameter of 80 m (260 ft). The older external spatter rampart, which has also been described as a cone, is about 15–25 m (49–82 ft) high and 460 m (1,510 ft) in diameter. It consists of spatter and scoria that ranges in colour from reddish to brownish and black to grey. Each structure was formed by a different style of volcanic activity; the spatter rampart was created by Hawaiian-style lava fountaining whereas the inner cone was created by low-intensity Strombolian explosions. The entire structure of Tseax Cone has been variously described as a cinder cone, a pyroclastic cone or a tephra cone.

About 470 m (1,540 ft) north of Tseax Cone and 150–200 m (490–660 ft) north of Melita Lake is a much smaller, unnamed asymmetrical satellite cone. It is about 20 m (66 ft) high, 50–55 m (164–180 ft) in diameter and heavily oxidized, containing a 4 m (13 ft) deep and 7 m (23 ft) in diameter summit crater. Extending southwest of the satellite cone is an eruptive fissure consisting of three or four tephra mounds. These mounds are a few metres high and are completely covered by black tephra. Red oxidized tephra beneath the black tephra was deposited by lava fountaining at the larger satellite cone.

=== Air-fall tephra layer ===
The inner cone was the source of an elongated tephra layer that extends 2.5 km (1.6 mi) to the northeast, suggesting a southwesterly wind at the time of eruption. It contains millimetre-sized sandstones and siltstones derived from the underlying Bowser Lake Group, as well as fine-grained metamorphic and plutonic rocks; these clasts make up about 0.5% of the total volume of the tephra layer. The tephra layer has an estimated volume of 2.5000000–3.4000000 m^{3} (88.28667–120.06987 ft^{3}), suggesting that it was deposited by a VEI-2 eruption. The volume of this tephra deposit is the first to be calculated for a mafic eruption in Canada.

=== Lava flows ===
Tseax Cone was the source of four distinct lava flows, all of which were probably erupted over a timespan of weeks to a few months. The first flow is the longest and most voluminous, accounting for about 84% of the total volume of lava erupted from Tseax Cone. It travelled 31.6 km (19.6 mi) through Crater Creek and Tseax River valleys to the Nass River where it forms a 3 km (1.9 mi) wide and 12 km (7.5 mi) long lava plain with an elevation of about 50 m (160 ft). This lava flow was most likely voluminous enough to block the Nass River for a short period of time. The second flow, representing about 13% of the total volume of lava, travelled 21.6 km (13.4 mi) through Crater Creek valley to near the mouth of the Tseax River valley. Both of these lava flows are in the form of pāhoehoe (Note: Pāhoehoe is basaltic lava with a smooth, glassy, undulating and porous surface.) and are poor in phenocrysts, having issued from the spatter rampart. They are among the longest lava flows in the Canadian Cordillera; lava flows more than 10 km (6.2 mi) long in this cordillera are usually basaltic in composition. The third flow accounts for less than 2% of the total volume of lava erupted from Tseax Cone, having travelled 7.2 km (4.5 mi) through Crater Creek valley to near Ross Lake in the Tseax River valley. The fourth flow is the shortest and least voluminous of the four lava flows; it represents about 1% of the total lava volume and travelled Crater Creek for 5.3 km (3.3 mi). These latter two lava flows are in the form of ʻaʻā (Note: ʻAʻā is lava with a rough rubbly surface composed of broken blocks called clinkers.) and are rich in phenocrysts, having issued from the inner cone.

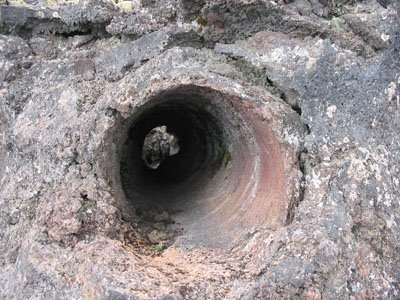
A horizontal lava tree mold

All four lava flows contain intact and collapsed lava tubes, as well as lava tree molds. At least four lava tubes are situated adjacent to and extend under Tseax Cone. They lie at an elevation of 590 m (1,940 ft) and were the subject of a glaciological study in 1975. At the time of study, two of the four lava tubes were found to be ice-free most of the year. One of these tubes contained a small braided stream whereas the other tube was dry and did not contain any stream sediments. The lack of stream sediments in the latter lava tube indicated that it remained dry and did not contain permanent ice deposits. Floors of ice were blocking the other two slightly higher tubes. As much as 20 centimetres (7.9 inches) of water was covering the ice in summer, indicating that unlike the other two lava tubes, they did not have exit points for water runoff at their lowermost levels. There was no evidence that the ice was dissipating as in many other ice caves despite an approximate mean annual temperature of 5 degrees Celsius (41 degrees Fahrenheit). The petrographic characteristics of the ice deposits were found to be similar to those in alpine caves such as Eisriesenwelt Cave in Austria and Coulthard Cave in the Canadian Rockies.

The eruption of the Tseax Cone lava flows had a radical impact on the landscape due to their sudden inundation of the Tseax River valley and the Nass River floodplain. Their disruption of the existing drainage system resulted in the formation of new channels and geomorphic features such as lava-dammed lakes, alluvial fan blockages and an inversion of topographic relief. The Tseax River was forced to abandon its alluvial channel in favour of bedrock channels along the lava flows, although in some places one or more channels flow on the lava. Vetter Creek, a tributary of the Nass River, flows along the western side of the lava and then disappears under the lava-covered Nass River floodplain through a series of sinkholes. The lower portions of several alluvial fans are buried under the lava flows, including the Vetter fan which is among the largest. Damming of Crater Creek and the Tseax River has resulted in Melita Lake and Lava Lake ponding behind the lava flows, although Lava Lake had already existed before the lava was erupted; it merely increased in depth. Ross Lake overlies lava flows in the Tseax River valley north of Lava Lake.

=== Age controversy ===
The exact timing of volcanism at Tseax Cone has been a subject of controversy because there are no direct written accounts. Reports of the rich oral history of the local Nisga'a people by missionaries as early as the 1910s suggest that Tseax Cone was erupting around 1770. However, the credibility of these reports has been disputed due to possible poor translation from Nisga'a to English. G. Hanson wrote in a 1923 Canada Department of Mines report that 170-year-old trees were found growing on lava from Tseax Cone; this would indicate an eruption prior to 1753. In 1935, Marius Barbeau concluded in the Canadian Geographical Journal that the latest eruption at Tseax Cone occurred in the late 18th century. In 1977, G. P. V. Akrigg and H. B. Akrigg speculated in British Columbia Chronicle, 1847–1871: Gold & Colonists that the Tseax Cone eruption was witnessed by naval officer Juan Francisco de la Bodega y Quadra on August 24, 1775. However, this is extremely unlikely because Bodega y Quadra's schooner, the Sonora, was anchored more than 280 km (170 mi) west of Tseax Cone across mountainous terrain. Michael D. Higgins proposed in a 2008 Journal of Volcanology and Geothermal Research article that the 1700 Cascadia earthquake may have caused the latest Tseax Cone eruption by destabilizing a subterranean magmatic system.

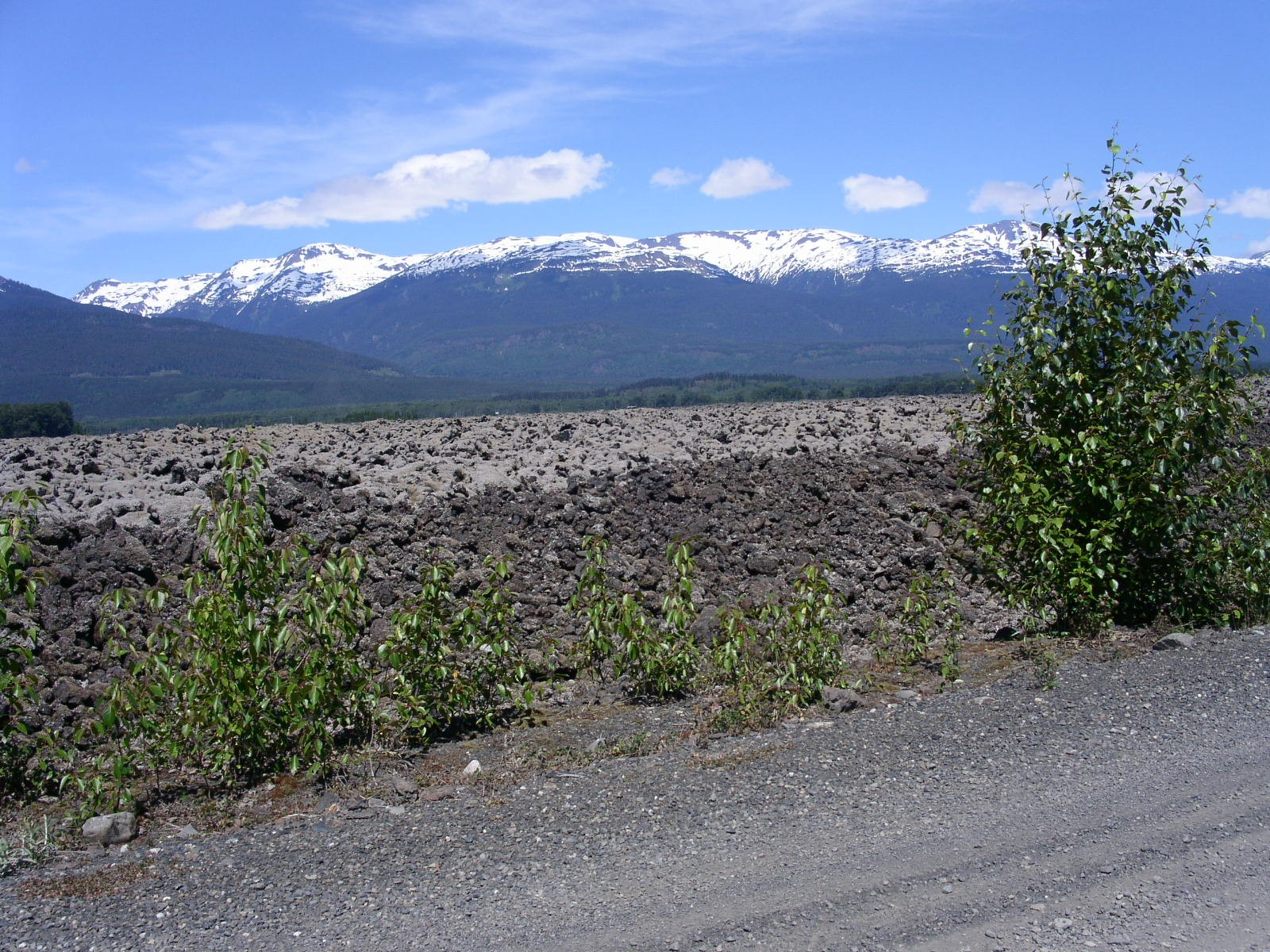
Tseax Cone lava flow in Nass Valley

Radiocarbon dating of trees killed by lava from Tseax Cone has also given inconclusive results. A lava-encased cottonwood near the Nass River was reported by Sutherland Brown in 1969 and Jack Souther in 1970 to have yielded a radiocarbon date of 220 ± 130 years. However, Lowdon et al. stated in a 1971 Radiocarbon article that this date was uncorrected and should in fact be 250 ± 130 years. In 2001, M. C. Roberts and S. McCuaig reported in The Canadian Geographer that a wood fragment of a lava-encased tree yielded a radiocarbon date of 220 ± 130 years; they gave a corrected date of 230 ± 50 years. These two radiocarbon dates were recalibrated by Michael D. Higgins in 2008 using calibration software and reinterpreted the age of the Tseax Cone eruption at between 1668 and 1714. Charred wood beneath tephra about 890 m (2,920 ft) northwest of Tseax Cone was reported by Williams-Jones et al. in 2020 to have yielded radiocarbon dates of 190 ± 15 years and 390 ± 15 years. These dates suggest that Tseax Cone erupted between 1675 and 1778, which correlates with the oral history of the Nisga'a, as well as reports that claim an eruption took place during the 18th century. A Common Era date of 1690 ± 150 years is provided by the Smithsonian Institution's Global Volcanism Program for the last known eruption of Tseax Cone. The timing of volcanism at Tseax Cone makes it one of the youngest volcanoes in Canada, as well as the site of one of the most recent volcanic eruptions in Canada.

It has been generally agreed by researchers that the Tseax Cone lava flows were emplaced during a single eruption. However, whether the volcano itself is the product of one or more distinct eruptive episodes has been a point of conjecture. In 1923, G. Hanson suggested that Tseax Cone formed during a single eruption. The single eruption hypothesis was also proposed by Sutherland Brown in 1969, but postulated that the volcano was destroyed by explosions and then reformed. In 1978, Vilho Wuorinen provided evidence for Tseax Cone having formed by two distinct eruptive episodes. This included a difference in surface erosion between the external spatter rampart and the inner tephra cone, as well as a difference in vegetation cover between the two structures. A charred tree trunk found standing in the vertical wall of the spatter rampart also yielded a radiocarbon date of 625 ± 70 years. Based on this evidence, Wuorinen proposed that the spatter rampart was formed by an initial period of activity around 1325. This eruptive period was followed by 375 years of dormancy, during which the spatter rampart was smoothed by erosion. A second eruptive episode around 1700 produced the inner tephra cone, the lava flows and the several smaller satellite cones in the area.

In 2020, Williams-Jones et al. reported new paleomagnetic and geochemical data supporting the hypothesis that the inner tephra cone, external spatter rampart, satellite cones, lava flows and tephra deposits were all formed during a single period of activity. However, the charred tree trunk sampled by Wuorinen that yielded a radiocarbon date of 625 ± 70 years was not found during their extensive mapping of the area in 2016 and 2017.

=== Hazards ===
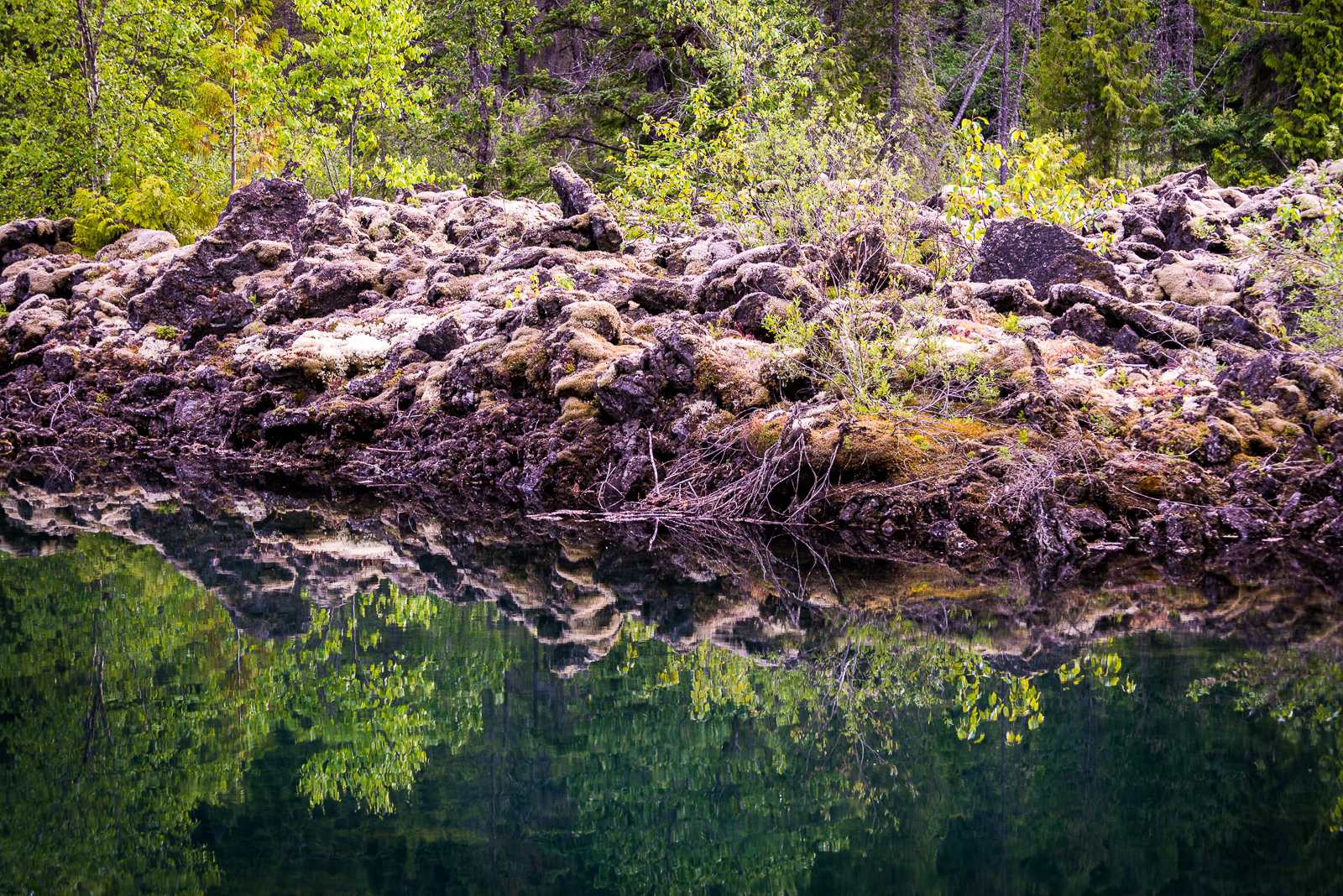
Nass Valley lava flow

The question of whether Tseax Cone formed during one or more distinct eruptive episodes has important implications for future activity and hazard mitigation efforts. Renewed activity from Tseax Cone is unlikely if the volcano is monogenetic; this is because monogenetic volcanoes are typically considered to erupt only once and to be short-lived. If Tseax Cone is polygenetic, future activity could produce lava flows and potentially block local streams as happened previously.

Damming of the Nass River by lava flows could negatively affect the salmon fisheries on this river. Carbon dioxide emissions from Tseax Cone could pose a threat to local inhabitants due to the gas's ability to replace oxygen in low-lying areas and poorly ventilated structures. Another potential hazard relating to future activity from Tseax Cone is the ignition of wildfires by eruptions since the area contains vegetation.

== Human history ==
=== Indigenous peoples ===
Tseax Cone is a prominent figure in Nisga'a history and culture due to its association with a natural disaster. According to Nisga'a legends, the Tseax Cone eruption caused the deaths of 2,000 people and the destruction of at least three villages on the banks of the Nass River. This would make it the deadliest geological disaster in Canada and the second-worst natural disaster in Canadian history by death toll; the 1775 Newfoundland hurricane caused at least 4,100 fatalities. Tseax Cone has therefore been described as the deadliest volcano in Canada. The three Nisga'a villages destroyed by the Tseax Cone eruption have been named Lax Ksiluux, Lax Ksiwihlgest and Wii Lax K'abit. Early 19th-century Nisga'a accounts of the eruption were reported by anthropologist Marius Barbeau in 1935 as follows:

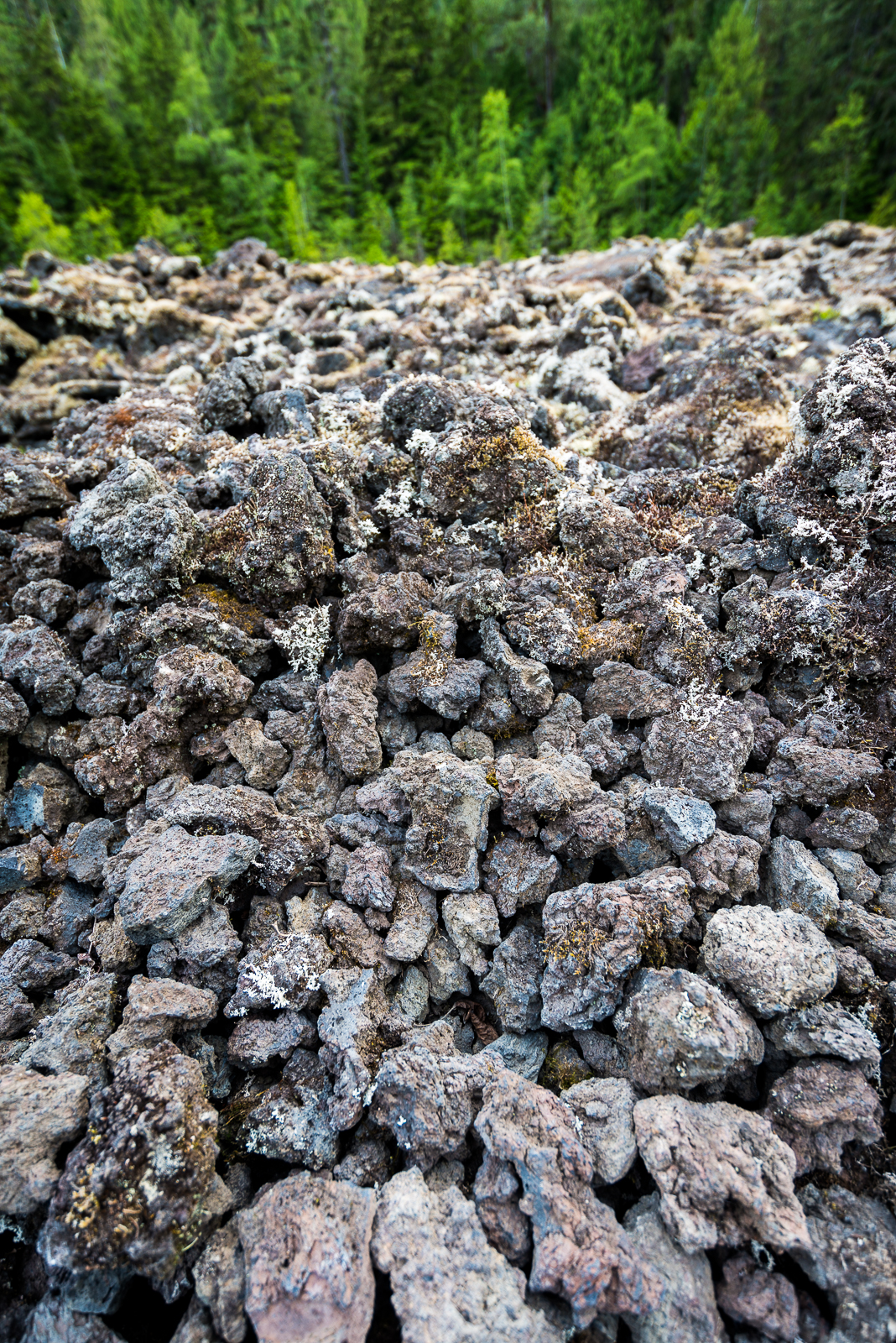
Detail of lava flow in Nass Valley

...the volcanic eruption soon after broke out. First there was smoke, like that coming out of a house, a big pillar of smoke. It was as if a house was burning on the mountain top. The people saw a big fire. The fire came down the side in their direction, but not as fast as forest fire. It moved down slowly, very slowly. It was strange and frightful. It was dangerous! There were fumes spreading ahead, and those who smelled them were smothered. They died and their body stiffened like rock. Frightened, the people of one tribe dug holes in the ground like underground lodges, and hid within, scared as they were of the mountain spirits. Likewise, the other tribe. That did not keep other people from dying of the fumes, mostly in the lower of the villages. As soon as the smoke dispersed some people ran away; a great many others stayed on. They did not suffer any more from the smoke. The fire then rolled down like a river, filled the lake, and for a time the water was a bed of flames. The stone was red and hot there for many days. As far as it went, all the way, it was flowing red. It started from the river where the people fished salmon, away up there, and ran down to the place where the canyon now is...

The "poisonous smoke" mentioned in Barbeau's report may have been odourless carbon dioxide. When the first lava flow from Tseax Cone entered the Nass Valley, it destroyed the three Nisga'a villages. Interaction of the lava flow with the Nass River may have produced dense clouds of vaporized water mixed with volcanic gases such as carbon dioxide and hydrogen sulfide. Methane may have also been released from wetlands as the lava flow travelled over the Nass River floodplain. While some of the Nisga'a may have escaped the lava flow by canoe to the far side of the Nass River, many of them were caught between the river and the advancing lava flow. The average discharge rate of the Nass River is strong enough to drown anyone attempting to escape by swimming during the summer months of June, August and September; Tseax Cone is suspected to have erupted during this time. Another hypothesis is that as the lava flow entered the Nass River, it caused sudden waves and turbulence which swept away the Nisga'a paddling across the river.

The Nisga'a also recall the disruption of the Tseax River, stating that "before the volcanic eruption, when our people lived here at Wii Lax K'ap, there was a stream close by where salmon spawned. The stream bed had white sand and they could easily spot the salmon going up stream. This stream was thus named Ksi Gimwits'ax. Years later [after the volcanic eruption] when this stream resurfaced, and though the Nisga'a knew it was the same tributary, it was renamed Ksi Sii Aks." A salamander species that once inhabited the bay area of Gitwinksihlkw on the Nass River is said to have disappeared or became extinct following the eruption.

=== Provincial park ===
Pleas for protection of the Tseax Cone lava flows date back to at least 1972 when forestry operations had left tree stumps and debris on their surfaces. Roads and trails had also been established on the lava flows by this time; their terrain is ideal for road construction due to their fragility. The lava was also being excavated from borrow pits and hauled to be used on forest service roads. It was not until 1992 when Nisga'a Memorial Lava Bed Provincial Park was founded to preserve the volcanic landscape and to honour the 2,000 Nisga'a people who died during the Tseax Cone eruption. This 17,717-hectare (43,780-acre) protected area is noteworthy for being the first provincial park in British Columbia to be managed by both BC Parks and a First Nation, as well as the first provincial park in British Columbia to combine Indigenous culture and natural features.

== Accessibility ==
The Tseax Cone lava flows are most easily accessed by travelling the Nisga'a Highway north of Terrace for 100 km (62 mi), the final 30 km (19 mi) of which is unpaved. An alternative route to the lava flows involves travelling the paved Stewart–Cassiar Highway north of Kitwanga for 78 km (48 mi) to the Cranberry River. From there, the unpaved Nass Forest Service Road extends 86 km (53 mi) southwest to Gitlaxt'aamiks which lies on the northeastern edge of the lava flows. Access to Tseax Cone is limited only to a 6 km (3.7 mi) long guided hiking tour from an access road 1.4 km (0.87 mi) north of the Lava Lake picnic site on the Nisga'a Highway.

== See also ==
- List of disasters in Canada by death toll
- List of volcanic eruptions by death toll
- List of Northern Cordilleran volcanoes
- List of volcanoes in Canada
- Volcanism of Western Canada
