= Lax Ksiluux =

Former Nisga'a village in northwestern British Columbia

Lax Ksiluux or Laxksiluux is a former Nisga'a village in northwestern British Columbia, Canada. It existed on the south side of the Nass River between the modern Nisga'a villages of Gitwinksihlkw and Gitlaxt'aamiks.

Lax̱ Ksiluux was in existence prior to the eruption of Tseax Cone in the 18th century which buried the community with thick lava flows along with the nearby Nisga'a community of Wii Lax K'abit.

== See also ==
- Nisga'a Memorial Lava Bed Provincial Park
