= Gitwinksihlkw =

Gitwinksihlkw Canyon City
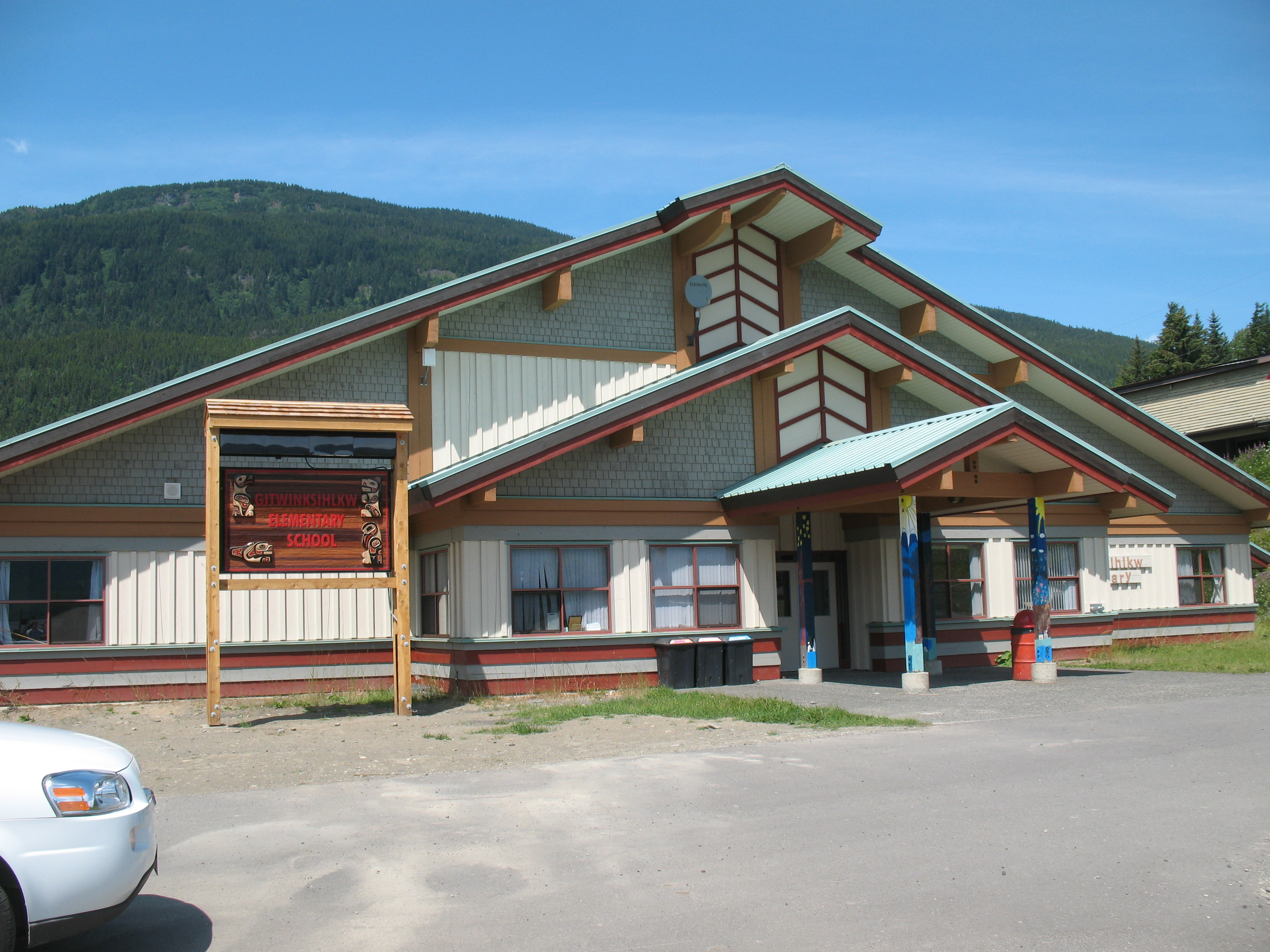
- Gitwinksihlkw Elementary School

- Location of Gitwinksihlkw in British Columbia
- Coordinates: 55°11′30″N 129°13′00″W
- Country: Canada
- Province: British Columbia
- Indigenous territories: Nisg̱a'a

Government
  - Governing body: Nisga'a Lisims Government

Population
  - Total: 201
- Time zone: UTC−8 (PST)
  - Summer (DST): UTC−7 (PDT)
- Postal code: V0J 3T0
- Area code: 250

Gitwinksihlkw (/ˈɡɪtwɪnsɪlk/ GIT-win-silk, /-wɪŋkʃɪsk/ -wink-shisk) formerly Canyon City, is a Nisga'a Village in the Nass River valley of northwestern British Columbia, Canada, near that river's confluence with the Tseax River. An older spelling is Kitwilluchsilt. It is one of four Nisga'a villages. Road access is via the Nisga'a Highway.

Gitwinksihlkw means "people of the lizard's habitat", a reference to the presence of ksilkw (salamanders) in the area prior to the eruption of Tseax Cone in the 18th century which buried the neighbouring villages of Wii Lax K'abit and Lax̱ Ksiluux.

== Education ==
The community is served by School District 92 Nisga'a and hosts Gitwinksihlkw Elementary School. The secondary school is in Gitlax̱t'aamiks.

== See also ==
- Nisga'a Memorial Lava Bed Provincial Park
