= Arrandale, British Columbia =

Coordinates: 54.891°N 130.891°W

Location of Arrandale in British Columbia

Arrandale is a settlement in British Columbia, located approximately 74 km north of Prince Rupert.

A salmon cannery operated at Arrandale from 1904 to 1942. It was located at the mouth of the Nass River, and employed Nisga'a people who lived in the villages along the Nass.

== Notable residents ==
- Birthplace of Joseph Gosnell, Nisga'a leader
