= Nisga'a Memorial Lava Bed Provincial Park =

Canadian provincial park in British Columbia

- IUCN category II (national park)
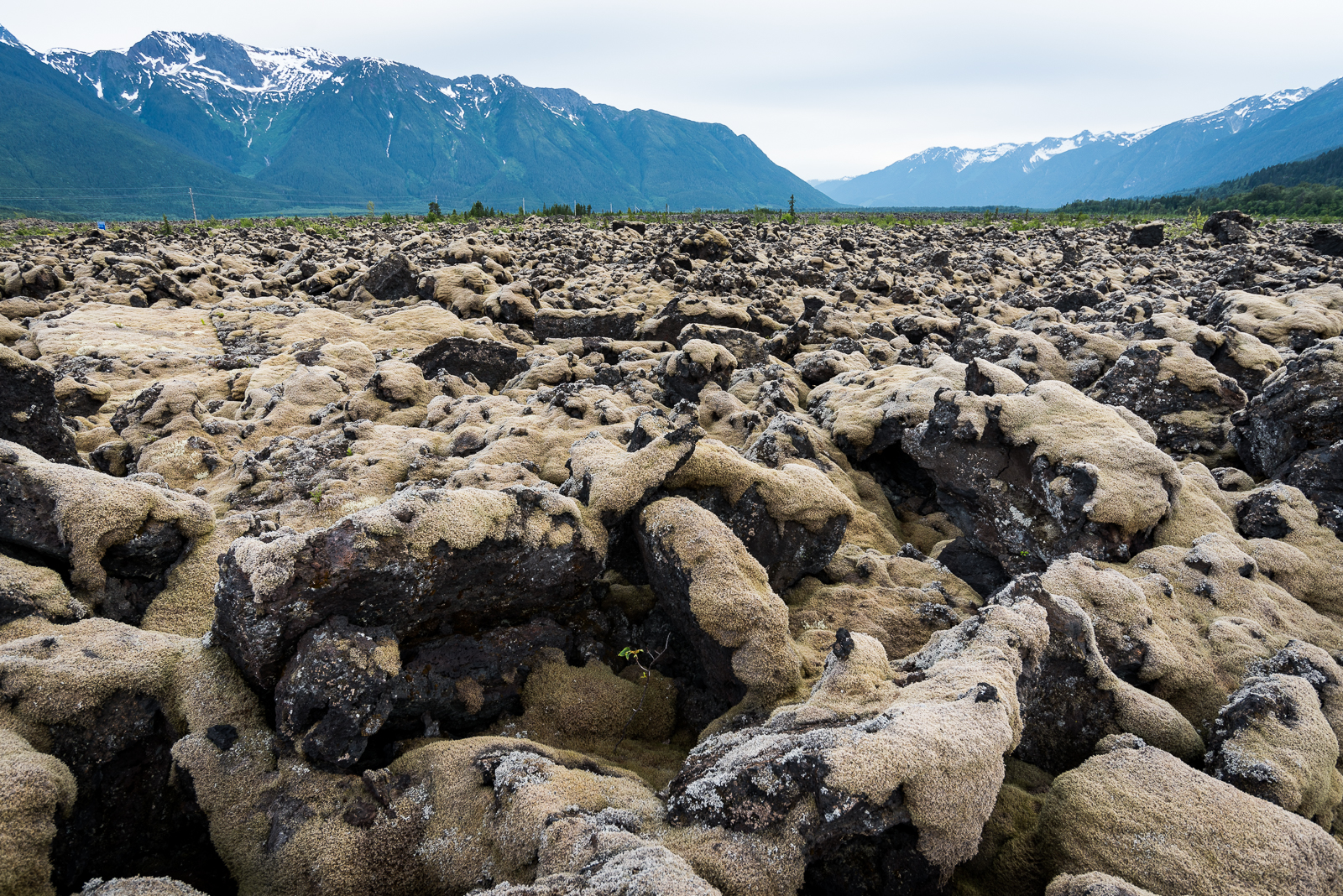

- Location within British Columbia
- Interactive map of Nisga'a Memorial Lava Bed Provincial Park
- Location: British Columbia, Canada
- Nearest city: Terrace
- Coordinates: 55°07′N 128°52′W
- Area: 178.93 km^{2} (69.09 sq mi)
- Established: April 29, 1992
- Governing body: BC Parks

Nisga'a Memorial Lava Bed Provincial Park (Nisga'a: Anhluut'ukwsim Lax̱mihl Angwinga'asankswhl Nisg̱a'a) is a provincial park in the Crater Creek, Tseax River and Nass River valleys of northwestern British Columbia, Canada, about 80 kilometres (50 mi) north of Terrace, and near the Nisga'a Villages of Gitlakdamix and Gitwinksihlkw.

The park was established by Order in Council on April 29, 1992, expanded in 1995, included in the Nisga'a Treaty in 2000, and is the first park in the province to be jointly managed by the government and a First Nation. An interpretive centre in a traditional Nisga'a longhouse informs visitors about the Nisga'a legend that accounts for the lava as well as geological causes.

The park has waterfalls, pools, cinder cones, lava tree molds, lava tubes, spatter cones, lava-dammed lakes, caves and other features created by lava flows. The park aims to protect moose, goats, marmots, bears and many other species of wildlife.

The park covers 178.93 square kilometres (69.09 sq mi) in area.

== Protected areas ==
Three small protected areas are contiguous with Nisga'a Memorial Lava Bed Provincial Park. Nisga'a Memorial Lava Bed Protected Area is a narrow, approximately 10.5-hectare (26-acre) corridor adjacent to Gitlaxt'aamiks established on December 13, 2011. Nisga'a Memorial Lava Bed Corridor Protected Area is a narrow corridor near Gitlaxt'aamiks. It covers about 1 hectare (2.5 acres) and was established on July 30, 2008. Nisga'a Memorial Lava Bed Corridor Protected Area (No. 2) is a narrow, approximately 63.5-hectare (157-acre) strip established on June 8, 2015, along the Nisga'a Highway corridor in the northwestern portion of Nisga'a Memorial Lava Bed Provincial Park.

== Recreation area ==
The former Nisga'a Memorial Lava Bed Recreation Area was annexed into Nisga'a Memorial Lava Bed Provincial Park in 1995, increasing the size of the park to 17,893 hectares (44,210 acres).

== Volcanic eruption ==
It is believed to be the site of Canada's most recent volcanic eruption and lava flow, a geological disaster that killed an estimated 2,000 people.

The source of the eruption was the Tseax Cone. Large lava flows dammed the Nass River and destroyed two villages of the Nisga'a people around the year 1700. Lava beds rise as much as 12 metres (39 feet) above the modern road. The lava flow also buried the lower drainage of Ksi Sii Aks and Vetter Creek.

Nisga'a oral histories record the names of the two villages destroyed in the eruption, Wii Lax K'abit and Lax Ksiluux.

== See also ==
- Volcanism of Canada
