= Ksi Sii Aks =

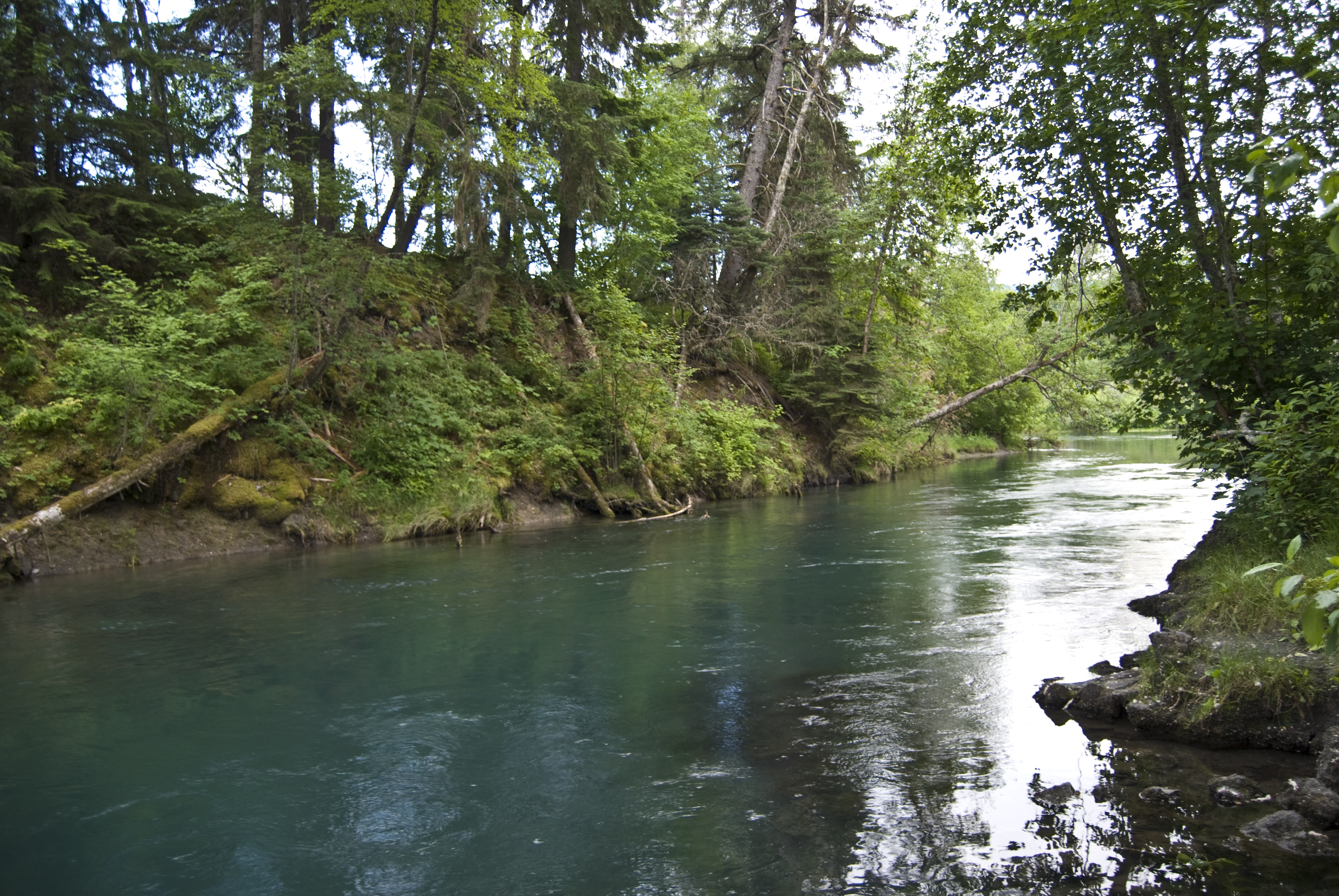
- Ksi Sii Aks

- Mouth of Ksi Sii Aks

Location
- Country: Canada
- Province: British Columbia
- District: Cassiar Land District

Physical characteristics
- Source: Nass Ranges
  - location: Hazelton Mountains
  - coordinates: 54°59′13″N 128°55′15″W
  - elevation: 1,310 m (4,300 ft)
- Mouth: Nass River
  - coordinates: 55°13′20″N 129°6′24″W
  - elevation: 29 m (95 ft)
- Length: 45 km (28 mi)
- Basin size: 610 km^{2} (240 sq mi)
- Discharge
  - average: 21 m^{3}/s (740 cu ft/s)

Basin features
- Tributaries
  - left: Poupard Creek, May Creek, Alder Creek, Aquila Creek, Auk Creek
  - right: Tumbling Creek, Jay Creek, Crater Creek, Bubo Creek, Canard Creek, Eider Creek, Teal Creek, Fulmar Creek, McLeod Creek, Gitzyon Creek, Gingit Creek
- Topo map: 103I14 Oscar Peak; 103I15 Kitsumkalum Lake; 103P2 Lava Lake; 103P3 Tseax River

The Ksi Sii Aks (/sɛsˈsiːæks/; formerly gazetted as the Tseax River /ˈsiːæks/) is a tributary of the Nass River in northwestern British Columbia, Canada. It is most notable as the namesake of Tseax Cone, a volcano within its basin that was responsible for an eruption in the 17th century that killed 2,000 Nisgaʼa people. Prior to the eruption, the Nisgaʼa name for this river was Ksi Gimwits'ax. Buried by the eruption, it eventually resurfaced. The Nisgaʼa recognized it as the same stream but renamed it Ksi Sii Aks: sii aks means "new body of water". Lower Vetter Creek, just west of Ksi Sii Aks, was also buried by lava from Tseax Cone. Both flow through Nisga'a Memorial Lava Bed Provincial Park as they near their confluences with the Nass River.

As prescribed by terms of the Nisgaʼa Treaty, the Tseax River was officially renamed the Ksi Sii Aks on 11 May 2000.

Ksi Sii Aks flows about 45 km (28 mi) north to the Nass River. From its source near Sand Lake the river flows through Sand Lake, Gainor Lake, and Lava Lake. It collects many tributary streams, the largest of which are Poupard Creek, May Creek, Alder Creek, Crater Creek, Auk Creek, and Gitzyon Creek.

== See also ==
- List of rivers of British Columbia
