= Lava Lake (British Columbia) =

Lava lake in Canada

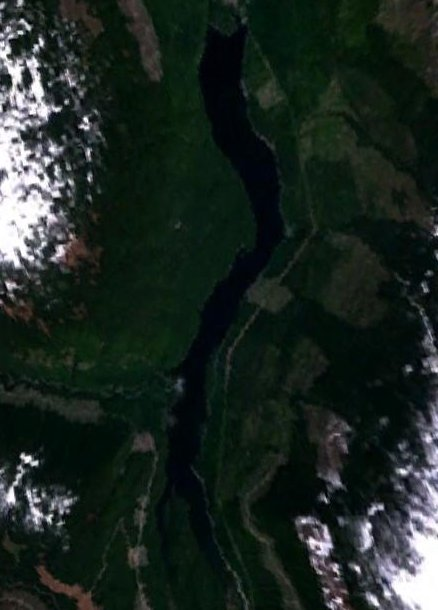
- Satellite image of Lava Lake

- Location within British Columbia
- Location: British Columbia
- Coordinates: 55.051°N 128.987°W
- Basin countries: Canada

Lava Lake is a lava dammed lake located in northwestern British Columbia, Canada. The lake lies within Nisga'a Memorial Lava Bed Provincial Park, which promotes fishing, hiking and other features.

== Formation ==
Lava Lake increased in size and depth when lava from the Tseax Cone dammed the Tseax River in the 18th century. The flow subsequently traveled 11 km (7 mi) north to the Nass River, where it filled the flat valley floor for an additional 10 km (6 mi), making the entire lava flow approximately 22.5 km (14 mi) long. This is one of Canada's youngest lava flows.

== See also ==
- Lava Lakes
- List of lakes in Canada
- Volcanism in Canada
