= Lava tree mold =

Hollow volcanic landform left by a tree trunk burnt in a lava flow

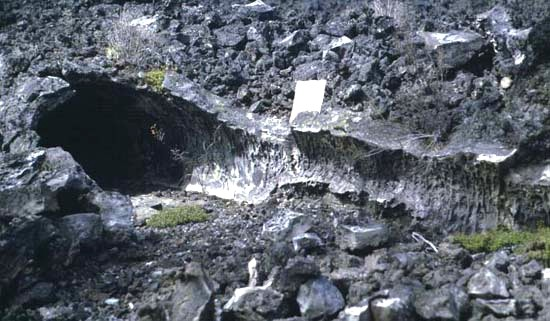
A horizontal lava tree mold

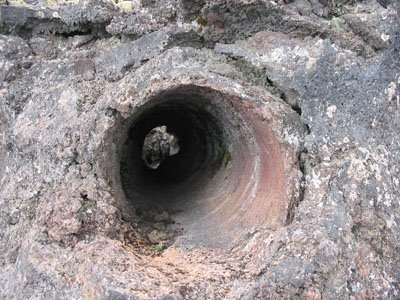
A horizontal lava tree mold in a Tseax Cone lava flow

A lava tree mold, sometimes erroneously called a lava tree cast, is a hollow lava cylinder formed around a tree trunk. These hollow volcanic landforms are produced when lava flows through a forest, coating the trees' trunks. The lava cools just enough to create a solid crust around the trunk, but the tree inside burns away, leaving a cavity. Molds of trees may be vertical (tree still in place) or horizontal (uprooted tree). In many cases, the mold formation requires slow-moving lava, as well as enough time for the mold to chill.

== Methane explosions ==
A unique phenomenon may occur during the formation of vertical tree molds. As the lava-encased tree burns, its roots are heated, emitting a so-called "producer gas", such as methane (CH_{4}). If the roots penetrate a cavity, such as a lava tube or tumulus crack, they may come into contact with atmospheric oxygen. Because a source of heat is already present, the charred root or the lava itself, a methane explosion may follow if the oxygen and "producer gas" mixture is between 5 and 15% (volume-percent fuel).

== See also ==
- Lava cave
