= Nisga'a Highway =

Highway in British Columbia

Highway 113
- Nisg̱aʼa Highway

Route information
- Maintained by the Ministry of Transportation and Infrastructure
- Length: 168.55 km (104.73 mi) Nass Camp spur: 12.38 km (7.69 mi)
- Existed: 2006–present

Major junctions
- South end: Highway 16 (TCH) in Terrace
- North end: Ging̱olx

Location
- Country: Canada
- Province: British Columbia

Highway system
- British Columbia provincial highways
← Highway 101	→ Highway 118

Nisg̱aʼa Highway, officially designated British Columbia Highway 113, is a highway in the Regional District of Kitimat-Stikine in British Columbia. It starts in Terrace at Highway 16. The route provides paved access to the settlements of the Nisg̱aʼa Nation - Gitlaxt'aamiks (New Aiyansh), Gitwinksihlkw (Canyon City), Ging̱olx (Kincolith), Laxgalts'ap (Greenville), Nass Camp and others. It enters the Nass Country via the valley of Kitsumkalum Lake, which connects from the Skeena and via the Nisga'a Memorial Lava Bed Provincial Park. The route heads north from Terrace and once into the Nass River Valley then travels west to Ging̱olx (Kincolith), at the Ksi Gingolx–Nass River confluence, for a total of 169 kilometres (105 mi). There is a 12-kilometre (7.5 mi) spur between New Aiyansh and Nass Camp.

The 29 kilometre section of the highway between Laxgalts'ap and Ging̱olx opened on 17 May 2003 at a cost of $34 million (equivalent to 49.74 million in 2022). Before the road, the only ways into Ging̱olx were via boat or floatplane.

The route received a newly designed shield and was given the numeric designation of Provincial Highway 113 in Summer 2006. The number 113 was assigned due to its historical significance to the Nisga'a. In 1887, a Nisga'a chief travelled to Victoria to meet with provincial government representatives, demanding self-government. The Nisga'a Final Agreement was passed in Parliament 113 years later in 2000.

== Major intersections ==
The entire route is in Kitimat-Stikine Regional District.

Location	km	mi	Destinations	Notes
Terrace	0.00	0.00	Highway 16 (TCH/YH) – Prince George, Prince Rupert	Southern terminus
Ging̱olx	168.55	104.73	Cliff Street	Northern terminus; road continues as Broad Street
1.000 mi = 1.609 km; 1.000 km = 0.621 mi

== See also ==
- Atlin Road
