= Nass Ranges =

Mountain range in British Columbia, Canada

- Location within British Columbia

Highest point
- Coordinates: 55.125°N 128.535°W

Geography
- Country: Canada
- Province: British Columbia
- Parent range: Hazelton Mountains

The Nass Ranges are a mountain range north of the Skeena River, west of Hazelton, and northeast of Terrace, British Columbia, Canada. It is a subrange of the Hazelton Mountains, which in turn form part of the Interior Mountains.

== Volcanic eruption ==
The Nass Ranges contain an active volcano called Tseax Cone; its volcanic gases are said to have killed of 2,000 Nisga'a people in an 18th-century eruption.

== Landforms ==
Landforms within the Nass Ranges include:

- Kiteen Ridge
- Maroon Mountain
- Mount Garland
- Mount Hoeft
- Mount Hoadley
- Mount Philippa
- Mount Prestley
- Mount Weber
- Tseax Cone
