= Nisgaʼa Final Agreement =

Treaty between First Nations and Canadian governments

The Nisgaʼa Final Agreement, also known as the Nisgaʼa Treaty, is a treaty that was settled between the Nisg̱aʼa, the government of British Columbia, and the Government of Canada. It was signed on 27 May 1998 and came into effect on 11 May 2000. As part of the settlement, nearly 2,000 km^{2} (800 sq mi) of land in the Nass River valley was officially recognized as Nisg̱a'a, and a 300,000 cubic decametres (1.1×10^{10} cu ft) (approx. 240,000 acre-feet) water reservation was also created. Bear Glacier Provincial Park was also created as a result of this agreement. Thirty-one Nisgaʼa placenames in the territory became official names. The land-claim settlement was the first formal modern day comprehensive treaty in the province— the first signed by a First Nation in British Columbia since the Douglas Treaties in 1854 (pertaining to areas on Vancouver Island) and Treaty 8 in 1899 (pertaining to northeastern British Columbia). The agreement gives the Nisgaʼa control over their land, including the forestry and fishing resources contained in it.

The agreement was signed on 27 May 1998 by Joseph Gosnell, Nelson Leeson, and Edmond Wright of the Nisg̱a'a Nation and by Premier Glen Clark for the Province of British Columbia. Then Minister of Indian Affairs and Northern Development Jane Stewart signed the agreement for the Canadian federal government on 4 May 1999.

== Context ==
In 1887, the Nisga'a met with the then-Premier of British Columbia to challenge the way in which the Chief Commissioner of Land and Works for the Colony of British Columbia was distributing much of Nisga'a traditional land in the Nass River valley to western settlers, in spite of the Royal Proclamation of 1763, which recognized Aboriginal title in British North America and acknowledged the existence and continuity of Aboriginal self-government. By 1890, the Nisga'a Land Committee had been established. In 1913, the Nisga'a sent a Petition to the British Privy Council in London requesting that their land claims be addressed by the King. In response, the Canadian federal government passed a law making it illegal for First Nations to "retain counsel to pursue land claims". In 1973, Frank Arthur Calder and the Nisga'a Nation Tribal Council lost the landmark case, Calder v British Columbia (AG), but the Supreme Court of Canada (SCC) ruled for the first time that aboriginal title to land existed prior to the colonization of North America. Thomas Berger successfully argued that the Nisga'a title to their traditional lands had never been extinguished. Calder was the first of a number of land claims negotiated in favour of the rights of aboriginal peoples.

The 1999 Nisga'a Treaty acknowledged that "the Nisga'a people have lived in the Nass River Valley since time immemorial".

== Role of hereditary chiefs ==
The Final Agreement recognized that the Adaawak (oral histories) of the hereditary chiefs Simgigat (hereditary chiefs) and Sigidimhaanak (matriarchs) continued to play an important role in accordance with the Ayuuk (Nisga'a traditional laws and practices).

== Legal challenges ==
The constitutional legality of the Nisga'a Final Agreement was challenged by some Nisga'a under Laxsgiik chief James Robinson (Sga'nisim Sim'oogit) and Mercy Thomas, particularly the self-government and law-making powers of the Nisga’a government. On 19 October 2011, the Supreme Court of British Columbia handed down its decision upholding the constitutional validity of the Nisga’a Final Agreement.
