= Nass River =

River in British Columbia, Canada

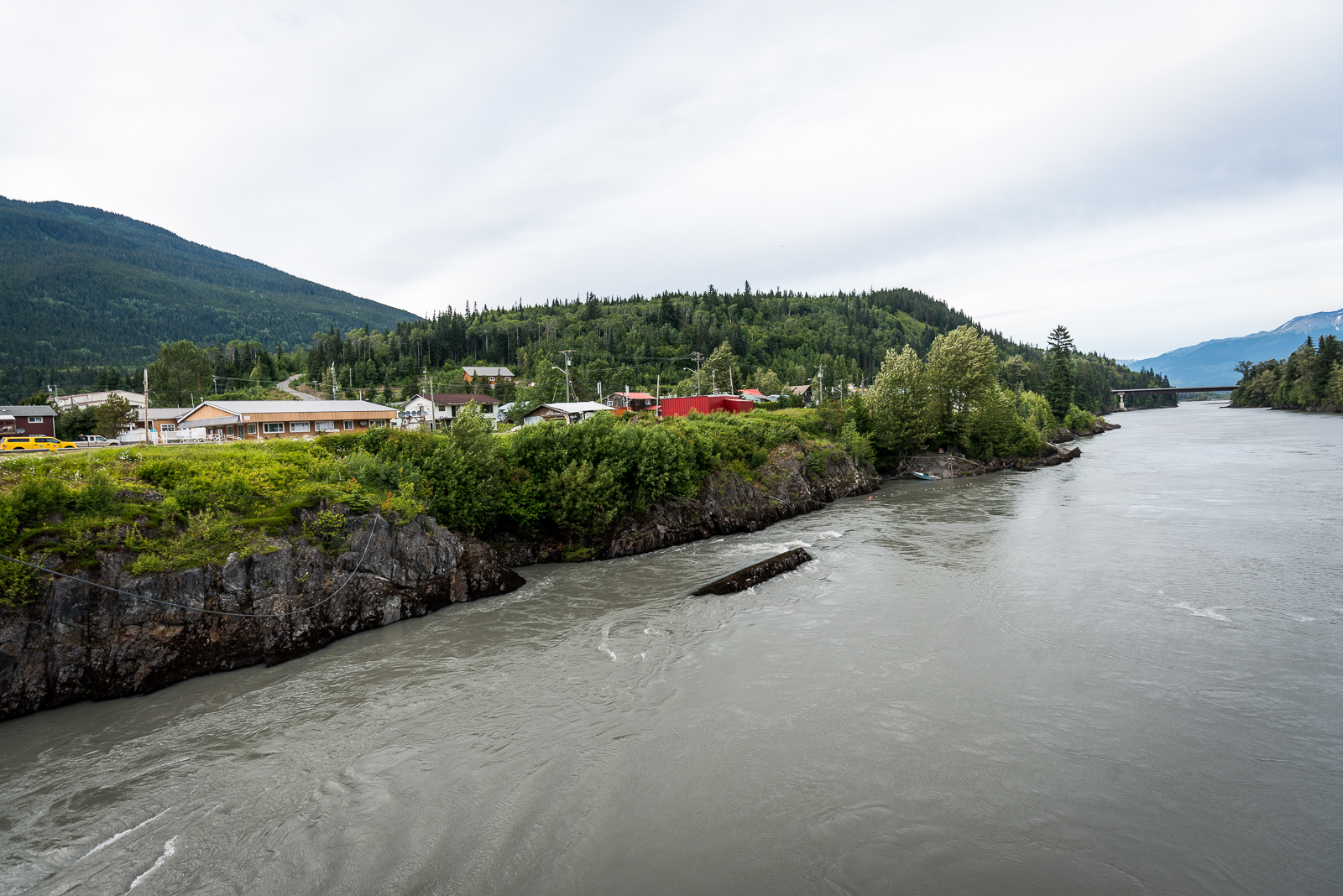
- View west on Nass River at Gitwinksihlkw

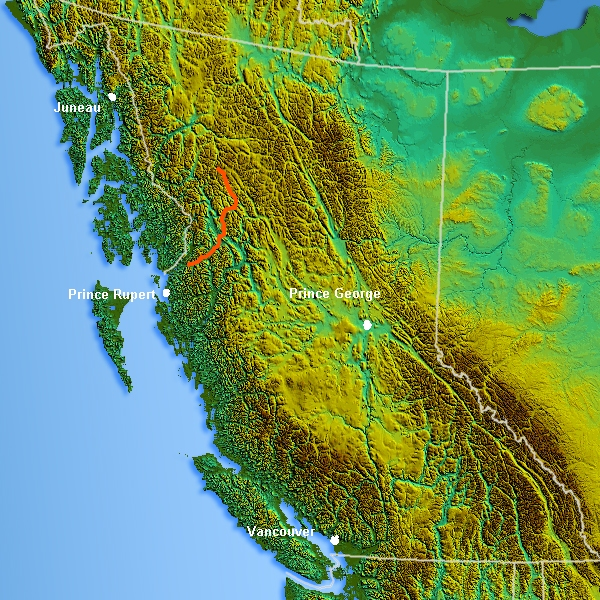
- Location map of the Nass River

Location
- Country: Canada
- Province: British Columbia
- Districts: Cassiar Land District; Range 5 Coast Land District

Physical characteristics
- Source: Nass Lake
  - location: Klappan Range, Skeena Mountains
  - coordinates: 57°9′59″N 129°6′8″W
  - elevation: 1,058 m (3,471 ft)
- Mouth: Nass Bay
  - location: Portland Inlet
  - coordinates: 54°58′37″N 129°53′22″W
- Length: 380 km (240 mi)
- Basin size: 20,839 km^{2} (8,046 sq mi)
- Discharge
  - location: Mouth
  - average: 770 m^{3}/s (27,000 cu ft/s)

The Nass River is a river in northern British Columbia, Canada. It flows 380 km (240 mi) from the Coast Mountains southwest to Nass Bay, a sidewater of Portland Inlet, which connects to the North Pacific Ocean via the Dixon Entrance. Nass Bay joins Portland Inlet just south of Observatory Inlet.

The English name "Nass" is derived from the Tlingit name Naas which means "intestines" or "guts" in reference to the river's large food capacity in its fish (Naish & Story 1963; Leer, Hitch, & Ritter 2001). Can also be a Tlingit word for "food depot". Former spellings are Naas and Nasse. The Nisga'a name for the river is K'alii Aksim Lisims "Lisims (river name) Valley". The Gitxsan name is Git-Txaemsim meaning People of Txeemsim (Raven or Trickster); Xsitxemsem in the dialect of the Gitanyow). Lisims means "murky" in Nisga'a, referring to the river's silt-laden flow.

The last 40 km (25 mi) of the river are navigable. The river is a commercially valuable salmon fishery. The basin of the Nass is the location of the first modern-day treaty settlement in British Columbia, between the government of that province and the Nisga'a Nation. The name Nisga'a is a reduced form of [naːsqaʔ], its etymology has been described as uncertain, although some sources associate it with the meaning "people of the Nass River"

On the term:

Archdeacon W. H. Collison, an authority on this subject, and who has resided at Kincolith, Nass bay, since 1883, states as follows: - "The term Nass is from the Tlingit tongue, and when, as was probable, the Tlingits from Tongass, at the entrance to Observatory inlet, met Captain Vancouver they gave him their name for the river, i.e., Nass, which means literally "the stomach," from the fact that their food supplies of salmon, oolachan.. a noted fishery."

== History ==
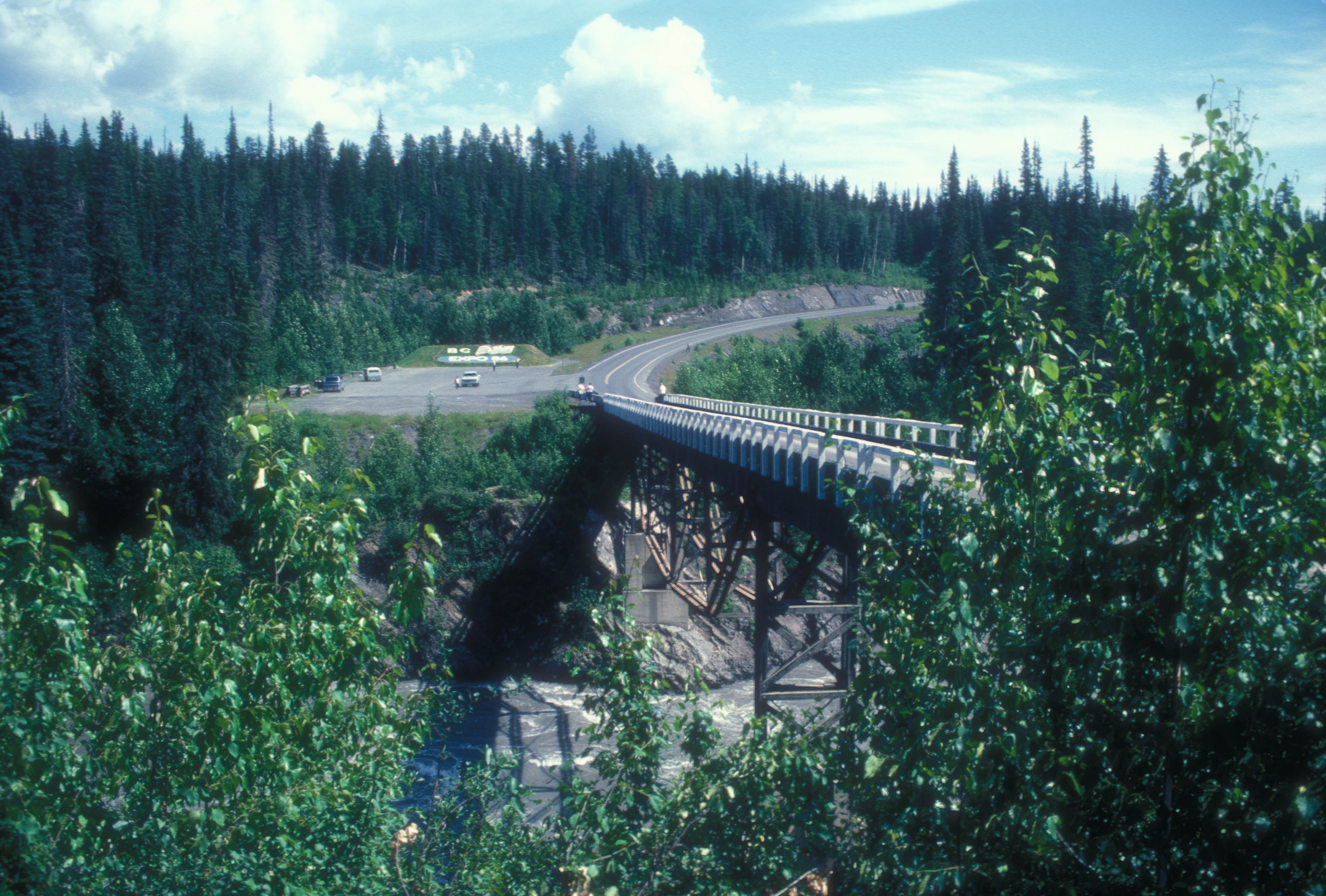
Nass River Bridge carries Highway 37 over the river

About 220 years ago, as recorded by the oral history of the Nisga'a people, the Nass River was dammed by a 22.5 km (14.0 mi) long lava flow which came from the Tseax Cone and destroyed the Nisga'a villages and caused the death of at least 2000 Nisga'a people by volcanic gas and poisonous smoke. The volcano has been active on at least two occasions (220 and 650 years ago) in the last millennium. Because of our knowledge of this previous disaster, modern monitoring techniques should include studies of the gases emitted by the volcanoes and the institution of a warning system to alert people living down slope from the volcanoes.

== Hazards ==
If the Tseax Cone were to erupt again, there could be a repeat of the poisonous gas disaster that happened to the Nisga'a people 220 years ago. The eruption could also cause forest fires and could potentially dam local rivers such as the Nass River and the Tseax if the volume of the lava flows are large enough. If the lava flows were to again reach the Nass River, it could have disastrous short-term consequences for the important salmon fisheries on the Nass River system.

== Tributaries ==
This is an incomplete list of tributaries, in upriver order:

- Xnukw (Iknouk River)
- Ksi Hlginx (Ishkheenickh River)
- Vetter Creek
- Ksi Sii Aks (Tseax River)
- Ksi Gwinhat'al (Kwinatahl River)
- Tchitin River
- Kinskuch River
- Cranberry River
  - Kiteen River
- White River
  - Flat River
- Meziadin River, Meziadin Lake
- Bell-Irving River
- Kwinageese River
- Taylor River
  - West Taylor River

== See also ==
- List of rivers of British Columbia
- Nisga'a
- Arrandale, British Columbia
